= 2001: A Space Odyssey (disambiguation) =

2001: A Space Odyssey is a 1968 science-fiction film.

2001: A Space Odyssey may also refer to:

- 2001: A Space Odyssey (novel)
- 2001: A Space Odyssey (comics)
- 2001: A Space Odyssey (score)
- 2001: A Space Odyssey (soundtrack)
- "Also sprach Zarathustra", an 1896 song by Richard Strauss, also known as the "2001: A Space Odyssey theme"
- 2001: A Space Odyssey franchise, see Space Odyssey

== See also ==
- 2000:1: A Space Felony, a 2017 videogame
- 2001: A Space Travesty, a 2000 comedy film
- 2001: A Space Road Odyssey, a 2001 Canadian television series
- "Great Gatsby: 2001: A Space Odyssey", a 2020 episode of the TV show Mrs. Davis
- Space Oddity (disambiguation)
- Space Odyssey (disambiguation)
- 2001 (disambiguation)
