= 2001: A Space Odyssey (soundtrack) =

1968 soundtrack album by various artists

Soundtrack album by Various artists
- Released: June 1968
- Recorded: 1958–1968
- Genre: Classical
- Length: 36:41
- Label: MGM Records

Professional ratings
Review scores
Source	Rating
AllMusic	4.5/5 stars

2001: A Space Odyssey is a soundtrack album to the film of the same name, released in 1968. The soundtrack is known for its use of many classical and orchestral pieces, and credited for giving many classical pieces resurgences in popularity, such as Johann Strauss II's 1866 Blue Danube Waltz, Richard Strauss' symphonic poem Also sprach Zarathustra, Adagio from Aram Khachaturian’s ballet Gayane, and György Ligeti's Atmosphères. The soundtrack has been re-issued multiple times, including a digitally remastered version in 1996.

== Music ==
From very early in production, Kubrick decided that he wanted the film to be a primarily nonverbal experience that did not rely on the traditional techniques of narrative cinema, and in which music would play a vital role in evoking particular moods. About half the music in the film appears either before the first line of dialogue or after the final line. Almost no music is heard during any scenes with dialogue.

The film is notable for its innovative use of classical music taken from existing commercial recordings, in contrast to most feature films then and now, which are typically accompanied by elaborate film scores or songs written specially for them by professional composers.

2001 is particularly remembered for the use of the opening theme from the Richard Strauss tone poem Also sprach Zarathustra (usually translated as "Thus Spake Zarathustra" or "Thus Spoke Zarathustra"), performed by the Vienna Philharmonic conducted by Herbert von Karajan. The use of Strauss's Zarathustra may be a reference to the theme of mankind's eventual replacement by superior men (Übermenschen, not Untermenschen, the inferior men), in Nietzsche's book Thus Spoke Zarathustra. The piece is first heard in the opening title which juxtaposes the Sun, Earth, and Moon. It is subsequently heard when an ape first learns to use a tool, and when Bowman is transformed into the Star-Child at the end of the film. Zarathustra thus acts as a bookend for the beginning and end of the film, and as a motif signifying evolutionary transformations, first from ape to man, then from man to Star-Child.

Also memorable in the film is its use of parts of Johann Strauss II's best-known waltz, An der schönen blauen Donau (By the beautiful Blue Danube, commonly known in English as The Blue Danube), during two intricate and extended space travel sequences: a Pan Am space plane docking at Space Station V, and a lunar landing. This is the result of the association that Kubrick made between the spinning motion of the satellites and the dancers of waltzes. A segment of the piece is also used in the closing credits.

Adagio from Aram Khachaturian's third Gayane ballet suite is heard during the sections that introduce Bowman and Poole aboard the Discovery, conveying a somewhat lonely and mournful quality.

In addition to the majestic yet fairly traditional compositions by the two Strausses (not related) and Khachaturian, Kubrick used four highly modernistic compositions by György Ligeti that employ micropolyphony, the use of sustained dissonant chords that shift slowly over time. This technique was pioneered in Atmosphères, the only Ligeti piece heard in its entirety in the film. Ligeti admired Kubrick's film but, in addition to being irritated by Kubrick's failure to obtain permission directly from him, he was offended that his music was used in a film soundtrack shared by composers Johann Strauss II and Richard Strauss. Other music used is Ligeti's Lux Aeterna, the second movement of his Requiem and an electronically altered form of his Aventures, the last of which was also used without Ligeti's permission and is not listed in the film's credits. The Kyrie section of Ligeti's Requiem is heard three times, all of them during appearances of the monolith. The first is its encounter with apes just before the Zarathustra-accompanied ape discovery of the tool. The second is the monolith's discovery on the Moon, and the third is Bowman's approach to it around Jupiter just before he enters the Star Gate. This last sequence with the Requiem has much more movement in it than the first two, and it transitions directly into the music from Ligeti's Atmosphères which is heard when Bowman actually enters the Star Gate. A shorter excerpt from Atmosphères is heard during the pre-opening credits prelude and film intermission, which are not in all copies of the film.

HAL's version of the popular song "Daisy Bell (Bicycle Built for Two)" (referred to by HAL as "Daisy" in the film) was inspired by a computer-synthesized arrangement by Max Mathews, which Arthur C. Clarke had heard in 1962 at the Bell Laboratories Murray Hill facility when he was, coincidentally, visiting friend and colleague John R. Pierce. At that time, a speech synthesis demonstration was being performed by physicist John Larry Kelly Jr., by using an IBM 704 computer to synthesize speech. Kelly's voice recorder synthesizer vocoder recreated the song "Daisy Bell"; Max Mathews provided the musical accompaniment. Arthur C. Clarke was so impressed that he later used it in the screenplay and novel. Many non-English language versions of the film do not use the song "Daisy". In the French soundtrack, HAL sings the French folk song "Au clair de la lune" while being disconnected. In the German version, HAL sings the children's song "Hänschen klein" ("Little Johnny"), and in the Italian version HAL sings "Giro giro tondo" (Ring a Ring o' Roses).

A recording of British light music composer Sidney Torch's "Off Beat Moods Part 1" was chosen by Kubrick as the theme for the fictitious BBC news programme "The World Tonight" seen aboard the Discovery.

== Track listing ==
No.	Title	Music	Performer(s)	Length
1.	"Also sprach Zarathustra, Op. 30"	Richard Strauss	The Berlin Philharmonic Orchestra, Karl Böhm	18:17
2.	"Requiem for Soprano, Mezzo-Soprano, 2 Mixed Choirs and Orchestra"	György Ligeti	The Bavarian Radio Orchestra, Francis Travis	4:21
3.	"Lux Aeterna"	György Ligeti	The Stuttgart Schola Cantorum, Clytus Gottwald	8:02
4.	"The Blue Danube"	Johann Strauss II	The Berlin Philharmonic Orchestra, Herbert von Karajan	10:00
5.	"Gayane Ballet Suite (Adagio)"	Aram Khachaturian	The Leningrad Philharmonic Orchestra, Gennadi Rozhdestvensky	5:23
6.	"Atmosphères"	György Ligeti	The Südwestfunk Orchestra, Ernest Bour	8:39
7.	"Main Title: Also sprach Zarathustra (Thus Spoke Zarathustra)"	Richard Strauss	The Berlin Philharmonic Orchestra, Karl Böhm	1:41
Total length:				56:25

== 1996 Rhino release track listing ==
No.	Title	Music	Performer(s)	Length
1.	"Overture: Atmosphères [film edit]"	György Ligeti	The Südwestfunk Orchestra, Ernest Bour	2:49
2.	"Also sprach Zarathustra [film version]"	Richard Strauss	The Vienna Philharmonic Orchestra, Herbert von Karajan	1:41
3.	"Requiem for Soprano, Mezzo-Soprano, Two Mixed Choirs and Orchestra [film edit]"	György Ligeti	The Bavarian Radio Orchestra, Francis Travis	6:33
4.	"The Blue Danube [film edit]"	Johann Strauss II	The Berlin Philharmonic Orchestra, Herbert von Karajan	5:42
5.	"Lux Aeterna [film edit]"	György Ligeti	The Stuttgart Schola Cantorum, Clytus Gottwald	2:52
6.	"Gayane Ballet Suite (Adagio)"	Aram Khachaturian	The Leningrad Philharmonic Orchestra, Gennadi Rozhdestvensky	5:15
7.	"Jupiter And Beyond (Requiem for Soprano, Mezzo-Soprano, Two Mixed Choirs and Orchestra / Atmosphères / Adventures [film edit])"			15:13
8.	"Also Sprach Zarathustra [film version]"	Richard Strauss	The Vienna Philharmonic Orchestra, Herbert von Karajan	1:41
9.	"The Blue Danube [complete version]"	Johann Strauss II	The Berlin Philharmonic Orchestra, Herbert von Karajan	8:17
10.	"Also Sprach Zarathustra [original MGM soundtrack album version]"	Richard Strauss	The Berlin Philharmonic Orchestra, Karl Böhm	1:39
11.	"Lux Aeterna [original MGM soundtrack album version]"	György Ligeti	The Stuttgart Schola Cantorum, Clytus Gottwald	5:59
12.	"Aventures [complete version]"	György Ligeti	Internationales Musikinstitut Darmstadt, György Ligeti	10:51
13.	"HAL 9000 (film dialogue compilation)"	Douglas Rain	Douglas Rain	9:11
Total length:				77:43

== Album release ==
The initial MGM soundtrack album release contained none of the material from the altered and uncredited rendition of "Aventures", used a different recording of "Also Sprach Zarathustra" than that heard in the film, and a longer excerpt of "Lux Aeterna" than that in the film. The soundtrack was a commercial success, reaching the 24th spot on the Billboard 200, peaking at number 2 on the Billboard Best Selling Classical LP's, and peaking at number 3 on the UK Albums Chart. It also received a RIAA certification of Gold for an excess of 500,000 copies.

In 1996, Turner Entertainment/Rhino Records released a new soundtrack on CD which included the material from "Aventures" and restored the version of "Zarathustra" used in the film, and used the shorter version of "Lux Aeterna" from the film. As additional "bonus tracks" at the end, this CD includes the versions of "Zarathustra" and "Lux Aeterna" on the old MGM soundtrack, an unaltered performance of "Aventures", and a nine-minute compilation of all of Hal's dialogue from the film.

Citing John Culshaw's autobiography Putting the Record Straight, the Internet Movie Database explains

The end music credits do not list a conductor and orchestra for "Also Sprach Zarathustra." Stanley Kubrick wanted the Herbert von Karajan / Vienna Philharmonic version on English Decca for the film's soundtrack, but Decca executives did not want their recording "cheapened" by association with the movie, and so gave permission on the condition that the conductor and orchestra were not named. After the movie's successful release, Decca tried to rectify its blunder by re-releasing the recording with an "As Heard in 2001" flag printed on the album cover. John Culshaw recounts the incident in "Putting the Record Straight" (1981)... In the meantime, MGM released the "official soundtrack" L.P. with Karl Böhm's Berlin Philharmonic "Also Sprach Zarathustra" discreetly substituting for von Karajan's version.

== Unused score ==
In the early stages of production, Kubrick had actually commissioned a score for 2001 from noted Hollywood composer Alex North, who had written the score for Spartacus and also worked on Dr. Strangelove. However, during post-production, Kubrick chose to abandon North's music in favor of the now-familiar classical music pieces the director had earlier chosen as "guide pieces" for the North score. North did not learn of the abandonment of his score until he saw the film while attending its premiere.

Also engaged to score the film was composer Frank Cordell. Cordell stated in interviews that the score would primarily consist of arrangements of Gustav Mahler works. This score remains unreleased. Like North's score, Cordell's work was recorded at the now demolished Anvil, Denham studios.

In March 1966, MGM became concerned about 2001's progress and Kubrick put together a show reel of footage to the ad hoc soundtrack of classical recordings. The studio bosses were delighted with the results and Kubrick decided to use these "guide pieces" as the final musical soundtrack, and he abandoned North's score. In an interview with Michel Ciment, Kubrick explained:

However good our best film composers may be, they are not a Beethoven, a Mozart or a Brahms. Why use music which is less good when there is such a multitude of great orchestral music available from the past and from our own time? When you are editing a film, it's very helpful to be able to try out different pieces of music to see how they work with the scene...Well, with a little more care and thought, these temporary tracks can become the final score.

== Influence and performances ==
Since the film, Also sprach Zarathustra has been used in many other contexts. It was used by the BBC and by CTV in Canada as the introductory theme music for their television coverage of the Apollo space missions, as well as stage entrance music for multiple acts including Elvis Presley later in his career (1971-1977). Jazz and rock variants of the theme have also been composed, the most well known being the 1972 arrangement by Eumir Deodato (itself used in the 1979 film Being There). Both Zarathustra and The Blue Danube have been used in numerous parodies of both the film itself and science fiction/space travel stories in general. HAL's "Daisy Bell" also has been frequently used in the comedy industry to denote both humans and machines in an advanced stage of madness.

On June 25, 2010, a version of the film specially remastered by Warner Bros., without the music soundtrack, opened the three hundred and fiftieth anniversary celebrations of the Royal Society at Southbank Centre in cooperation with the British Film Institute. The score was played live by the Philharmonia Orchestra and Choir. This has become a recurring event at the Southbank Centre's Royal Festival Hall, with repeat performances in 2011 and on October 2, 2016. These later two performances were played by the London Philharmonic Orchestra and sung by the Philharmonia Choir, the latter as part of a more general programme of similar events entitled "Film Scores Live."

On June 14, 2013, a repeat presentation of the film accompanied by live orchestra and choir was performed at Symphony Hall in Birmingham, again accompanied by the Philharmonia Orchestra conducted by Benjamin Wallfisch together with the choir Ex Cathedra.

A presentation of the film accompanied by live orchestra and choir premiered in the United States on August 18, 2015, at The Hollywood Bowl in Hollywood, California, accompanied by the Los Angeles Philharmonic conducted by Brad Lubman together with the choir Los Angeles Master Chorale.
