= 2001 (disambiguation) =

2001 was a common year starting on Monday of the Gregorian calendar.

2001 may also refer to:

== Film and television ==
- 2001: A Space Odyssey, a science-fiction film directed by Stanley Kubrick
  - 2001: A Space Odyssey (novel), a science-fiction novel by Arthur C. Clarke
  - 2001: A Space Odyssey (soundtrack), from the Kubrick film
  - 2001: A Space Odyssey (score), an unused score for the Kubrick film composed by Alex North
  - 2001: A Space Odyssey (comics), a science-fiction comic by Jack Kirby
- 2001: A Space Travesty, a 2000 parody film
- 2001: A Space Road Odyssey, a 2001 Canadian television series
- 2001: Do Hazaar Ek, a 1998 Bollywood film
- "2001" (Stargate SG-1), a television episode

== Music ==
- 2001 (Dr. Dre album), 1999
- 2001 (Tokio Hotel album), 2022
- Prelude (Deodato album), 1972 (reissued in 1977 as 2001)
- 2001, a 2001 album by Peter Frohmader
- "2001", a song by Melissa Etheridge on her 1992 album Never Enough
- "2001", a song by Foals from their 2022 album Life Is Yours

== Other uses ==
- 2001 (pinball), a pinball machine produced by Gottlieb
- 2001 Einstein, an asteroid discovered in 1973
- 2001 Mars Odyssey, a NASA Mars probe
- Diario 2001, a Venezuelan daily newspaper
- 2001 Club, a former disco nightclub franchise

== See also ==
- 2000:1: A Space Felony, a 2017 videogame
- MMI (disambiguation) ("MMI" being 2001 in roman numerals)
- 2001: A Space Odyssey (disambiguation)
- "Also sprach Zarathustra", an 1896 musical work by Richard Strauss, known for its fanfare used in the movie 2001: A Space Odyssey
