= 2K1 =

2K1 may refer to:

- the year 2001
- 2K1 Mars, Soviet missile system
- NBA 2K1, 2000 video game
- NFL 2K1, 2000 video game
- World Series Baseball 2K1, 2000 video game

== See also ==
- 2001 (disambiguation)
- 2K (disambiguation)
- Y2K!, Ice Spice album, 2024
