= Atmosphères =

Composition by György Ligeti

- Orchestral music by György Ligeti
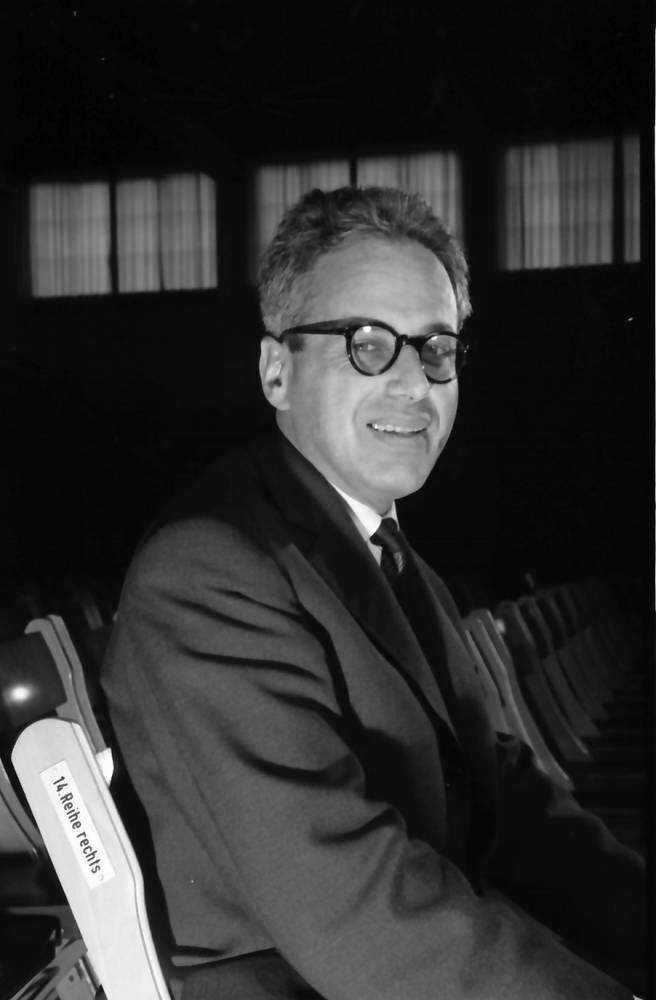
- György Ligeti in 1961
- Related: used in Kubrick's 2001: A Space Odyssey
- Composed: 1961
- Dedication: memory of Mátyás Seiber
- Scoring: orchestra

Atmosphères is a piece for orchestra, composed by György Ligeti in 1961. It is noted for eschewing conventional melody and metre in favor of dense sound textures. After Apparitions, it was the second piece Ligeti wrote to exploit what he called a "micropolyphonic" texture. It gained further exposure after being used in Stanley Kubrick's film 2001: A Space Odyssey.

== History ==
Atmosphères was commissioned in 1961 by the Southwest German Radio (SWF) and had its world premiere on 22 October 1961 by Hans Rosbaud conducting the SWF Symphony Orchestra at the Donaueschingen Festival. Ligeti dedicated the piece to the memory of Mátyás Seiber, a fellow Hungarian-born composer who had been killed in a car crash the previous year. The SWF recorded this performance for broadcast, and this recording has been released commercially on CD several times. Paul Griffiths writes that this performance made Ligeti a "talking point". Ligeti says that after this and his earlier piece Apparitions, he "became famous". Atmosphères was a major influence on the German composer Helmut Lachenmann.

Leonard Bernstein conducted the New York premiere in 1964 with the New York Philharmonic and recorded it with them at the Manhattan Center in New York on 6 January 1964 for Columbia Masterworks, reissued in 1968 on Columbia Records, and in 1999 on a Sony Classical CD.

== Music ==
=== Instrumentation ===
Atmosphères is scored for an orchestra with the following instrumentation.

Woodwinds

4 flutes (all double piccolo)
4 oboes
4 clarinets (4th also E♭ clarinet)
3 bassoons
1 contrabassoon

Brass
6 horns
4 trumpets
4 trombones
1 tuba

Keyboard instrument

1 piano (played by 2 percussionists)

Strings

14 first violins
14 second violins
10 violas
10 cellos
8 double basses

=== Style ===
Atmosphères eschews conventional melody, harmony, and rhythm, in favor of "sound masses" with sliding and merging orchestral clusters that suggest timbre is the central focus of the piece. It exemplifies Ligeti's notion of "static, self-contained music without either development or traditional rhythmic configurations". Harold Kaufman has written that Ligeti's music collapses foreground and background elements of musical structure into a "magma of evolving sound".

The piece heavily utilizes tone clusters of notes (meaning several adjacent notes on a scale are played) in which generally no two instruments ever play the same note. The popular music edition All Music Guide describes the piece as having clusters of notes from which sections fall out, leaving "masses of natural notes". The piece features "shimmering rapid vibrato, multiple high glissandi, waves of string harmonics in different metres, [and] notes moving along the same path but at different speeds".

Program notes provided by Ensemble Sospeso describe Atmosphères as the "first major alternative to European serialism: static masses of orchestral sound that give the simultaneous sense of immobility and motion." On the other hand, a close investigation of Ligeti's relationship to the Darmstadt avant-garde concludes that Atmosphères should "be seen as part of an evolution within the serial tradition and a response to problems articulated within it, rather than as a break from that tradition altogether". The sound masses in Atmosphères are seen particularly to conform to the serial precepts of Karlheinz Stockhausen's "statistical form", as exemplified in Gesang der Jünglinge (1955–56) and Gruppen (1955–57).

=== Sense of timelessness ===
The piece evokes a sense of timelessness in which the listener is lost in a web of texture and tonality. Harald Kaufmann has described it as "acoustically standing still", a stationary sound that has movement within it that is similar to breathing. The classical music edition of All Music Guide says the music "scarcely hints at forward movement. Rather the listener hears an all but motionless series of sound evolutions unfolding at various moments". According to Peter Laki:

One of the central ideas in Atmosphères, the realization of complete stasis through extensive inner motion, germinated during Ligeti's Hungarian years. The composer later noted that he had been preceded in the writing of "static" music by Wagner (Prelude to Das Rheingold and the Prelude to act 1 of Lohengrin), Bartók (opening of The Wooden Prince), and Schoenberg ("Farben", the third in Five Pieces for Orchestra, Op. 16). But neither Bartók nor Wagner or Schoenberg ever achieved stasis through its exact opposite, as Ligeti did in Atmosphères. Large portions of the piece consist of extremely dense counterpoint, with up to 56 voices (each string instrument has his or her own individual part to play). But the imitative entrances are so close to one another that it is impossible to perceive them separately, with apparent immobility as the result.

Larry Sitsky has written that in Ligeti's music "the density of the successive structures is such that the conventional parameters through which musical form (melody, rhythm, harmony) is traditionally perceived appear to have been evacuated. Consequently, these evolving sound structures seem stationary, as if detached from the passage of time. To paraphrase the composer himself, the micropolyphonic textures tend to hang like a mighty oriental tapestry, suspended outside time." Likewise, Thomas May states that in his breakthrough orchestral pieces Apparitions and Atmosphères Ligeti's "new musical point of view... looked beyond the traditional basic elements of melody, harmony, and rhythm, immobilizing these in favor of the mass and texture of sound itself. Gigantic clusters of chords hover in a stasis that negates familiar signposts of harmony and pulse. This dense sound-fog became known as the signature Ligeti style".

=== Ligeti's musical theory ===
In an essay titled "Metamorphoses of Musical Form", Ligeti developed the concept of musical "permeability" according to which a musical structure is "permeable" if it allows a free choice of intervals and "impermeable" if not. Ligeti here considers Palestrina's music as having "perhaps the lowest degree of permeability" because its handling of consonance and dissonance was the most sensitively defined of all historical styles. Ligeti saw permeability and impermeability of groups, structures, and textures in serial music as substitutes for the form-shaping function of melodic lines, motifs, and harmonies in older styles. Some textures could be layered and juxtaposed; some musical structures will mix with others seamlessly, while other structures will stand out.

Atmospheres exemplifies much of Ligeti's theory suspending harmony in favor of sustained sounds. The piece opens with a "fully chromatic cluster covering more than five octaves, held by strings and soft woodwinds", out of which various groups of instruments drop out successively, followed by various "strands of sonic fabric" reenter the composition, first white notes then black notes along with shifts in timbre and duration of notes that drive the piece forward. Consequently, Griffiths writes, "the whole piece is a study in what Ligeti's essay had called the 'permeability' of musical structures, how some will mix with a great many others, some stand always apart; it is also a demonstration of what can be achieved when all the usual regulators, being so finely tuned at the time by other composers, are left open."

Ligeti noted that Atmosphères had a polyphonic structure, but one organized by his own rules. The polyphonic structure, he stated, cannot be heard by the listener, but remains "underwater", hidden from the listener. Ligeti coined the term "micropolyphony" to describe this texture.

== In 2001: A Space Odyssey ==
Stanley Kubrick chose this piece and others by Ligeti for the scenes in deep space and those with the monolith in his 1968 film 2001: A Space Odyssey because its quality of mystery was a good sonic realization of his vision. This resulted in the exposure of Ligeti's music to a much wider audience. The recording of Atmosphères used in the soundtrack to the film 2001: A Space Odyssey was with the Southwest German Radio Symphony Orchestra conducted by Ernest Bour. Kubrick would go on to employ other Ligeti compositions in his films The Shining and Eyes Wide Shut.

According to program notes published by the San Francisco Symphony, Ligeti was not pleased that his music occurred in a film soundtrack shared by composers Johann and Richard Strauss. Nevertheless, the piece has been performed in concert several times with other works featured in the film 2001: A Space Odyssey, such as a 2010 performance by the Nashville Symphony, which performed it along with the full-length version of Richard Strauss' Thus Spake Zarathustra.

== Notable recent performances ==
A 2006 performance of Atmosphères by the London Philharmonic Orchestra was noted for its direct transition without interruption into Stravinsky's The Rite of Spring, which Sunday Times music critic Hugh Canning described as a "stroke of programming genius", continuing:

Jurowski preceded Stravinsky's Rite with Ligeti's static cloudscape, Atmosphères. Instead of presenting these seminal modernist works as separate items, Jurowski segued seamlessly from the nothingness of the Ligeti's close into the opening bassoon solo of the Stravinsky. The contrast between these two pieces—the Ligeti a study in motionlessness, the Stravinsky a convulsive eruption of movement—was only enhanced by Jurowski's device, making one listen with refreshed ears.

Edward Seckerson of UK's The Independent also described this segue as a "startling coup" while Richard Morrison of the daily edition of The Times noted that "Jurowski even kept a beat going, to fool us ... so that Stravinsky's bassoon emerged out of Ligeti's wispy, endlessly drifting clouds of clusters."

Another recently acclaimed performance was that by Austria's Gustav Mahler Jugendorchester (Gustav Mahler Youth Orchestra) performing in England, a performance described as "a focused reading" in which the conductor "Nott duly coerced a delicacy from each section of the orchestra—particularly the centrifugal strings—that gave a wonderful smoothness to the performance".

== Reworking ==
Belgian classical guitarist Tom Pauwels wrote a reduced arrangement of Atmosphères for a small chamber orchestra of eight instruments, using a graphic score for clarinet, cello, accordion, guitar and laptop (sine tones) based on the Ligeti original. It has been performed by Plus-minus ensemble, and posted by the ensemble as a video.

== Discography ==
In chronological order of recording, many of which have been released in different couplings.

- SWF-Sinfonieorchester Baden-Baden, conducted by Hans Rosbaud [recording of the world premiere in Donaueschingen on 22 October 1961]
  - 1990. 40 Jahre Donaueschinger Musiktage 1950–1990. Col Legno AU-031800 CD. 4-CD set + 1 booklet. Munich: Col Legno Musikproduction; Staufen im Breisgau: Aurophon. (With music by Hartmann, Boulez, Nono, Xenakis, Penderecki, Stockhausen, Stravinsky, Zimmermann, Holliger, Lachenmann, Raseghi, Messiaen, Carter, Rihm, and Kalitzke.)
  - 1996. 75 Jahre Donaueschinger Musiktage 1921–1996: CD 9. Col Legno WWE 12CD 31899 (12-CD set); Col Legno WWE 1CD 31908 (single CD number). Munich: Col Legno Musikproduction; Staufen im Breisgau: Aurophon.
  - 2000. Musiktage Donaueschingen: Uraufführungen 1955–1989. Musik in Deutschland 1950–2000; Konzertmusik; Musik für Orchester; Sinfonische Musik; Porträt. RCA Red Seal/BMG 74321-73510. 1 CD, 12 cm. + booklet. [Munich]: BMG Classics. [Note: booklet misidentifies the conductor as Ernest Bour] (With music by Xenakis, Penderecki, Messiaen, Holliger, Lachenmann, and Rihm.)
- New York Philharmonic, conducted by Leonard Bernstein [recorded in New York City at the Manhattan Center 6 January 1964]
  - 1965. Leonard Bernstein Conducts Music of Our Time. Columbia Masterworks/CBS MS 6733 (stereo). LP recording, 1 sound disc, 33 1/3 rpm, 12 in. New York: CBS Records. (With music by Morton Feldman, Larry Austin, and four improvisations by the New York Philharmonic. Program notes by Edward Downes on the jacket.)
  - 1968. Music from 2001: A Space Odyssey. Suite from Aniara. Columbia Masterworks/CBS MS 7176 (stereo). LP recording, 1 sound disc, 33 1/3 rpm, 12 in. New York: CBS Records.
  - 1999. Music of Our Time. Sony Classical SMK 61845. 1-CD. New York: Sony Music Entertainment. (With music by Morton Feldman, Edison Denisov, Gunther Schuller, Olivier Messiaen, and four improvisations by the New York Philharmonic. Program notes by Tim Page in English with German and French translations inserted in container.)
- Sinfonie-orchester des Südwestfunks, Baden-Baden, cond. Ernest Bour [recorded April 1966]
  - [1966]. György Ligeti: Atmospheres (1961) für grosses Orchester und Schlagzeug. Continuum für Cembalo solo. Wergo Taschen-Diskothek Neuer Musik. Wergo WER 305. LP recording, 2 sides, 7 inch, 33 1/3 rpm, stereo. Baden-Baden: Wergo Schallplattenverlag, GmbH.
  - 1966. György Ligeti: Aventures (1962), Nouvelles aventures (1966): für 3 Sänger und 7 Instrumentalisten, Atmosphères, Volumina für Orgel. Studio-Reihe neuer Musik. Wergo WER 60 022. LP recording, 1 disc, 33 1/3 rpm. stereo, 12 in. Baden-Baden: Wergo Schallplattenverlag, GmbH.
  - 1968. 2001, A Space Odyssey: Music from the Motion Picture Sound Track. LP recording, 1 sound disc, 33 1/3 rpm, stereo, 12 in. MGM 1SE 13 ST. [New York]: MGM.
  - 1970. György Ligeti: Aventures (1962); Nouvelles aventures (1962–65); Atmosphères; Volumina (1961–62, 1st version). Heliodor. (Program notes by the composer and others on container and on leaf inserted in container.)
  - 1988. György Ligeti: Kammerkonzert für 13 Instrumentalisten; Ramifications für Streichorchester; Ramifications für 12 Solostreicher; Lux aeterna; Atmosphères. Wergo WER 60162-50. Compact disc, 1 sound disc, 4 3/4 in. Mainz: Wergo. (Program notes by the composer and others in German with English and French translations inserted in container.)
  - [1990s]. 2001: A Space Odyssey—Original Soundtrack. Polydor/PolyGram 831 068. Compact disc, 1 sound disc: digital, stereo., 4 3/4 in. Hamburg: Polydor.
  - 1996. 2001: A Space Odyssey—Original Soundtrack. Rhino/Atlantic 72562. Compact Disc. 1 sound disc, stereo, 4 3/4 in.
  - 2000. Musik in Deutschland 1950–2000: Konzertmusik, Musik für Orchester, Sinfonische Musik, Porträt. RCA Red Seal/BMG Classics 74321-73508; 74321 73509; 74321 73510; 74321 73511; 74321 73512; 74321 73513; 74321 73656. Compact disc 6 sound discs, stereo, 4 3/4 in. [Germany]: BMG Classics: Deutscher Musikrat; [N.p.]: RCA Red Seal.
- Yomiuri Nihon Kokyo Gakudan, cond. Seiji Ozawa [programme recorded live at Tokyo's Nissei Theatre on May 1, 2, and 4, 1966]
  - 1967. Orchestra Space at Nissei Theatre, 1966, vol. 2. Victor SJV 1513. 1 LP sound disc : analog, 33 1/3 rpm, stereo; 12 in. [Japan]: Victor.
  - 1978. Orchestral Space. Varese Sarabande/MCA VS-81060. LP recording, 1 disc, 33 1/3 rpm, stereo, 12 in. [Los Angeles]: Varese Sarabande. Reissued in 1986 on CD, Varèse Sarabande/MCA VSD-47253.
- Wiener Philharmoniker, cond. Claudio Abbado [recorded live, Vienna, Musikverein, Grosser Saal, October 1988]
  - 1990. Wien Modern. Deutsche Grammophon/PolyGram 429 260. 1 CD sound disc, digital, stereo, 4 3/4 in. Hamburg: Deutsche Grammophon.
  - 2006. György Ligeti: Clear or Cloudy. Deutsche Grammophon/Universal Classics 477 6443-477 6447. Compact disc 4 sound discs, digital, stereo, 4 3/4 in. Hamburg: Deutsche Grammophon.
- Hollywood Bowl Orchestra, cond. John Mauceri [recorded in Hollywood, California: July 11, September 20 & 22, 1994]
  - 1995. Journey to the Stars: A Sci-Fi Fantasy Adventure. Philips/PolyGram 446 403. [N.p]: Philips; New York: PolyGram Classics. (With music by Karl-Birger Blomdahl, Bernard Herrmann, Jerry Goldsmith, Bebe and Louis Barron, Franz Waxman, John Corigliano, Richard Strauss, Alex North, John Williams, Danny Elfman, and Arthur Bliss.)
- City of Birmingham Symphony Orchestra, cond. Simon Rattle [recorded 1996]
  - 2005. Leaving Home – Music In The 20th Century: A Conducted Tour by Sir Simon Rattle and The City of Birmingham Symphony Orchestra, vol. 2: Rhythm. Arthaus Musik 102035. DVD video recording, 4 3/4 in., region 0 (worldwide). Also available as part of a 7-DVD set, Arthaus Musik 102 073. Leipzig: Arthaus Musik GmbH. (Excerpts from Atmosphères, as well as from music by Stravinsky, Varèse, Reich, Boulez, Messiaen, Mahler, and Nancarrow.)
- Philharmonisches Orchester Heidelberg, cond. Thomas Kalb [recorded late 1990s].
  - 1999. Nacht der Planeten, vol. 1. Hoepfner Classics. Antes Edition BM-CD 31.9131. Compact disc, 1 sound disc, digital, stereo, 4 3/4 in. Bühl: Bella Musica Edition. (With music by Wolfgang Amadeus Mozart and Alexander Raskatov.)
- Berliner Philharmoniker, cond. Jonathan Nott [recorded Berlin, Philharmonie, 13–16 December 2001]
  - 2002. The Ligeti Project II. (With: Ligeti, Lontano, San Francisco Polyphony, Apparitions, and Concert românesc.). Teldec/Warner Classics 8573-88261. Compact disc recording. Hamburg: Teldec Classics
  - 2008. Reissued as disc 2 of The Ligeti Project: Atmosphères, Chamber Concerto, Etc. 5-CDs. Teldec/Warner Classics 510998; Warner Classics 2564 69673-5. Hamburg: Teldec Classics.; [United Kingdom]: Warner Classics.
- Finnish Radio Symphony Orchestra, cond. Hannu Lintu [recorded Helsinki, Musiikkitalo, 29–31 August 2012]
  - 2013. György Ligeti. (With: Lontano, Violin Concerto (soloist Benjamin Schmid), Atmosphères, San Francisco Polyphony). Ondine ODE 1213-2. Compact disc recording. Ondine Oy.
