= Space Odyssey (disambiguation) =

Space Odyssey is a science fiction franchise created by Arthur C. Clarke and Stanley Kubrick beginning with the film 2001: A Space Odyssey

Space Odyssey, The Space Odyssey, A Space Odyssey, or Space Odysseys, may also refer to:

== Stage and screen ==
- 2001: A Space Odyssey, a 1968 film directed by Stanley Kubrick, part of the Space Odyssey franchise, also known simply as "A Space Odyssey" or "2001"
- Space Odyssey: Voyage to the Planets, a 2004 fictional documentary TV series
- Star Odyssey, a 1979 Italian film also called "Space Odyssey"
- "A Space Odyssey", a 1977 episode of the TV show We've Got Each Other

== Literature ==
- 2001: A Space Odyssey (novel), a 1968 novel by Arthur C. Clarke, part of the Space Odyssey franchise, also known simply as "A Space Odyssey" or "Odyssey One" or "2001"
- Space Odysseys, a 1975 multi-author anthology overseen by Brian Aldiss
- Space Odyssey: Stanley Kubrick, Arthur C. Clarke, and the Making of a Masterpiece, a 2018 book on making the film 2001: A Space Odyssey by filmmaker Michael Benson

== Music ==
- Space Odyssey (album set), an album series by Richard Andersson
- The Space Odyssey Trilogy (album set), an album series by RanestRane
- "Space Odyssey" (song), a song by Shogun featured on the 2011 compilation album Universal Religion Chapter 5
- "Also sprach Zarathustra" (tune), an 1896 tone poem by Richard Strauss, also known as the "2001: A Space Odyssey theme", or simply "2001" or "Space Odyssey"

== Videogames ==
- Space Odyssey: The Video Game, a 4X videogame
- Starscape (Russian: Космическая одиссея, romanized: Kosmicheskaya Odisseya, lit. 'Space Odyssey'), a 2002 videogame
- K-2: Space Odyssey, one of the 1978 Fairchild Channel F Videocarts
- Space Odyssey, a 1981 arcade game developed by Sega

== Other uses ==
- Space Odyssey, a science theatre at Science City, Kolkata, West Bengal, India
- Space Odyssey, a space exhibit at the Denver Museum of Nature and Science, Denver, Colorado, US
- SpACE Odyssey (yacht), a sailboat in the Half Ton class

== See also ==
- "Odyssey in Space" (sculpture), a 1980 sculpture by Rodney Ripps
- Other Space Odysseys, a 2010 art exhibition curated by Giovanna Borasi
- 2001: A Space Odyssey (disambiguation)
- Cosmos: A Spacetime Odyssey, a 2014 science documentary TV series
- Rebirth of the Afronauts: A Black Space Odyssey, a 2021 short film in the project 21 Black Futures
- Odyssey (disambiguation)
- Space Oddity (disambiguation)
- Space (disambiguation)
