= Requiem (Ligeti) =

Choral and orchestral composition by György Ligeti

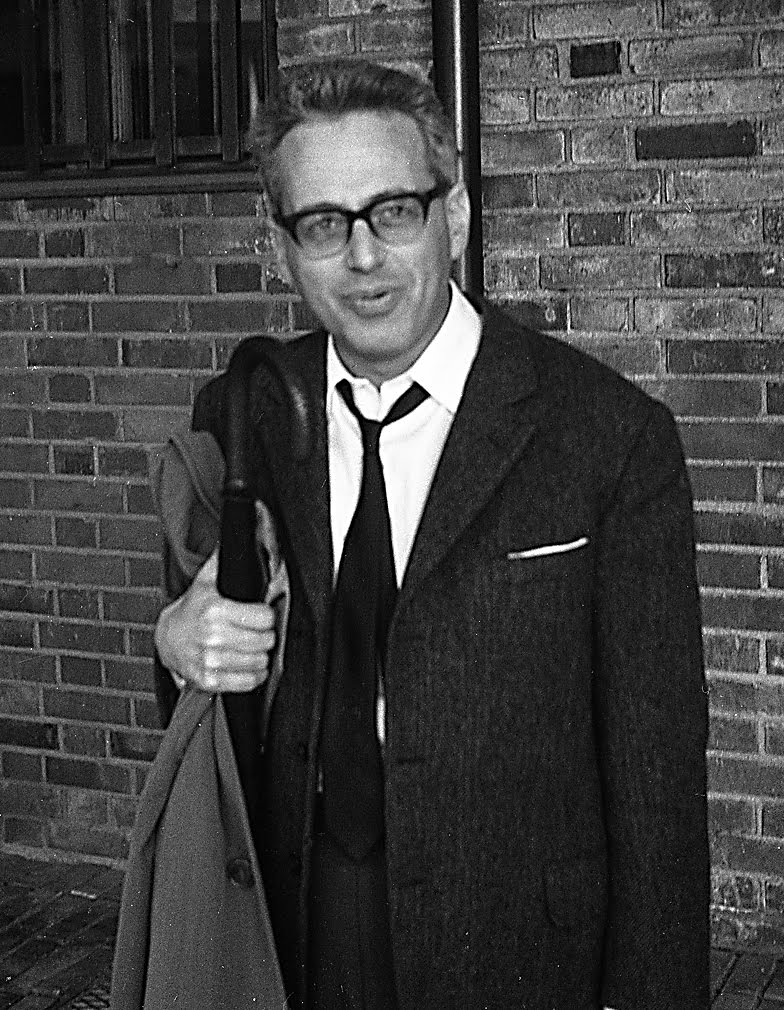
György Ligeti in the 1960s

The Requiem by the Hungarian composer György Ligeti is a large-scale choral and orchestral composition, composed between 1963 and 1965.

The work lasts for just under half an hour, and is in four movements: "Introitus", a gradual unbroken plane of sound; "Kyrie", a complex polyphonic movement reaching a fortissimo climax; "Dies Irae", which uses vocal and orchestral extremes in theatrical gestures; and the closing "Lacrimosa", for soloists and orchestra only, which returns to the subdued atmosphere of the opening.

== Composition ==
Ligeti was commissioned to write a work in 1961 for a series of new-music concerts on Swedish Radio. It was he who suggested a Requiem, and had initially intended to set the full text of the Requiem mass. However, he ultimately decided on setting the composition around half of the original text. Ligeti spent nine months working on the six-minute "Kyrie" section alone, which featured the most complex polyphony he had ever attempted, featuring twenty vocal lines, although as Harald Kaufmann notes, "it refers back... to the classical vocal polyphony of the old masters". In particular, it drew for inspiration from the work of Ockeghem, "refracted and multiplied through the technique of micropolyphony."

He scored the work for large choral forces, featuring two mixed choirs and soprano and mezzo-soprano soloists. The orchestra consists of the following instrumentation.

Woodwinds:

3 flutes (2nd and 3rd doubling piccolos)
3 oboes (3rd doubling English horn)
3 clarinets (2nd doubling bass clarinet, 3rd doubling E♭ clarinet and contrabass clarinet)
2 bassoons
1 contrabassoon

Brass
4 French horns
3 trumpets
1 bass trumpet
3 trombones (tenor, bass, contrabass)
1 tuba

Percussion

glockenspiel
xylophone
snare drum
bass drum
suspended cymbal
tam-tam
slapstick
tambourine

Keyboards

celesta
harpsichord

Strings

harp

first violins
second violins
violas
cellos
double basses

== Premiere and recordings ==
The work was first performed on 14 March 1965 in Stockholm, with the soloists Liliana Poli, Barbro Ericson and the Choir and Orchestra of Swedish Radio under Michael Gielen. During rehearsals, Ligeti was sent a telegram from the chorus master who entreated him to come at once to Stockholm as they were all "terrified" of the piece. The same soloists and conductor were joined by the Choir of Bavarian Radio and the Orchestra of Hesse Radio, Frankfurt, for the first recording, made in November 1968. A second recording was made in 2003 with soloists, London Voices and the Berliner Philharmoniker under Jonathan Nott. A further recording has been made by the WDR Symphony Orchestra under Peter Eötvös.

== In popular culture ==
Ligeti's Requiem achieved almost instant fame (for a modern classical work) due to its use by Stanley Kubrick in his 1968 film 2001: A Space Odyssey, although the soundtrack only uses the portion from the beginning to the climax of the "Kyrie" section. The piece was not specially recorded for the film, but according to conductor Francis Travis came from a live performance he directed in 1967. Requiem was also featured in Godzilla (2014).
