= Oddity =

Oddity or oddities may refer to:

== Music ==
- The Oddities (rap group), a Toronto rap group formed in 1998
- "Oddity", a song by Eric Prydz from his 2016 album Opus
- Oddity EP, a 1998 album by Cold
- Oddities, an album by London After Midnight, 1998
- Oddities, an album by Bride, 1998

== Television and film ==
- Oddities (TV series), a Discovery Channel program which premiered in 2010
- The Head (1994 TV series), an animated show billed under MTV's Oddities that aired on MTV in the 1990s
- Oddity (film), a 2024 Irish horror film

== Other uses ==
- The Oddities (professional wrestling), professional wrestling group in the late 1990s
- Oddity (video game), upcoming video game

== See also ==
- Odditties (The Clean album), 1983
- Odditties (Kate & Anna McGarrigle album), 2010
- Space Oddity (disambiguation)
