= Djinn chair =

Modernist chair created by Olivier Mourgue

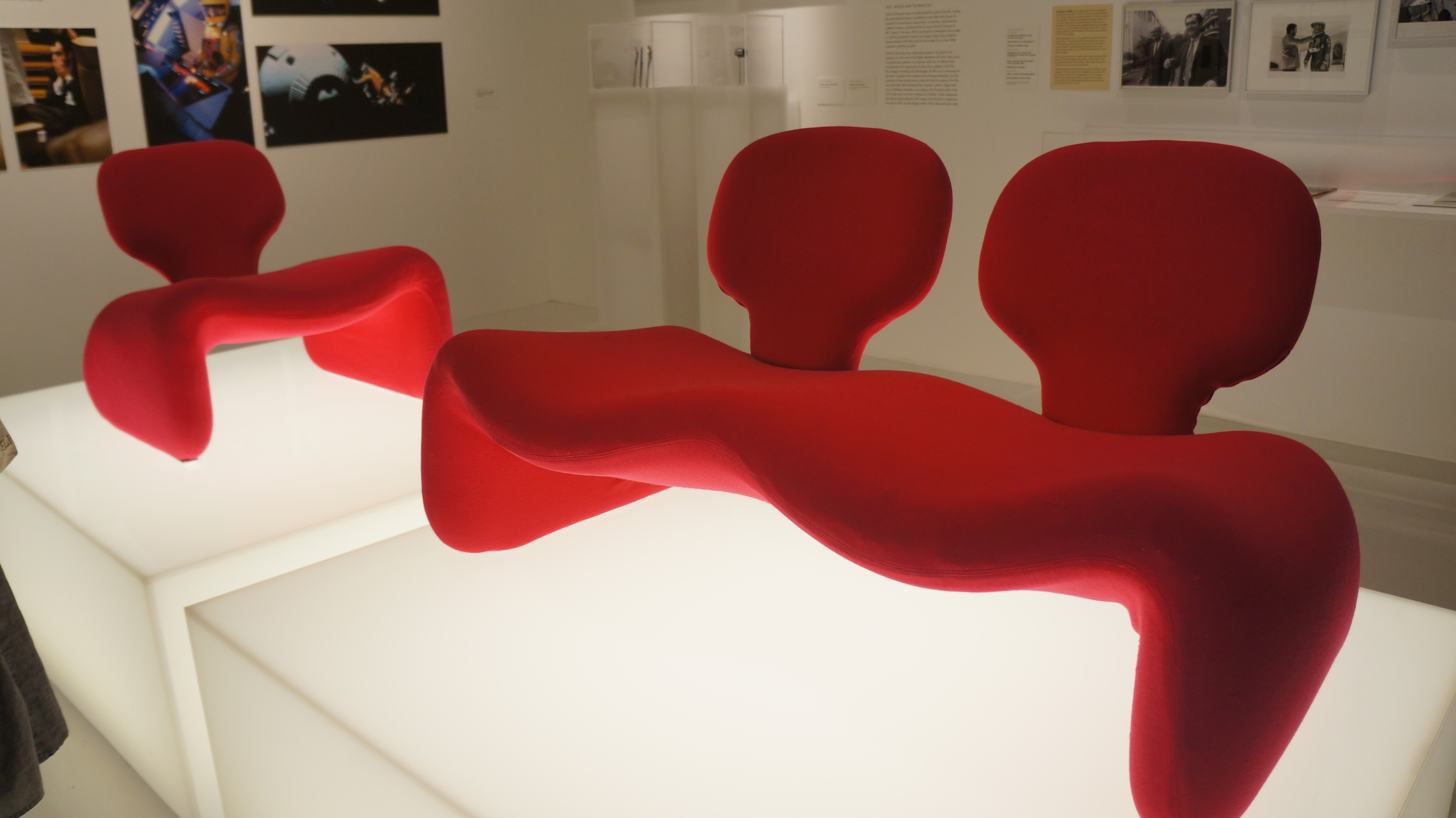
- Djinn chair (left) and sofa
- Designer: Olivier Mourgue
- Date: 1964–1965
- Materials: Tubular Steel frame. Polyether foam covered in removable nylon jersey.

The Djinn chair is a modernist chair created by French designer Olivier Mourgue in the 1960s. Originally called the "Low fireside chair", it is also commonly referred to as the "2001 chair", because of its prominent appearance in the film 2001: A Space Odyssey.

== History ==
The Djinn chair is one element of a series of Djinn furniture designed by noted French designer Olivier Mourgue. In 1964 the first piece of the series, a chaise longue, was introduced by Airborne in Merignac Cedex, France. The rest of the series was released in 1965, and includes the iconic "Low fireside chair", a two-seat sofa, and a foot stool. The set remained in production until 1976.

The name "Djinn" refers to an Islamic spirit capable of changing shape. The design's low profile was an attempt to emulate the informal lifestyle of the time. The set was introduced during a time when growing interest in Eastern mysticism was influencing Western decorative arts.

== Survivors ==
The stretch jersey covering used for the Djinn series did not wear well. Worse yet, the polyether foam used in the construction of Djinn chairs tends to degrade over time, causing the pieces to become unusable. "Things should have a short life," Mourgue said in 1965, when he was 26.

Djinn chairs were sold worldwide, and in Europe they have become valuable designer collectibles. A 1964–1965 green Djinn Chaise Longue is in the permanent collection of the Museum of Modern Art in New York City. It was donated by George Tanier, Inc. in 1966.
