= Olivier Mourgue =

French industrial designer (1939–2026)

- Born: Olivier Jean Pierre Mourgue; 15 April 1939; Neuilly-sur-Seine
- Died: 5 October 2026 (aged 87); Plouguiel
- Occupations: Designer, artist

Olivier Jean Pierre Mourgue (15 April 1939 – 5 October 2026) was a French industrial designer best known as the designer of the futuristic Djinn chairs used in the film 2001: A Space Odyssey.

== Life and career ==
Mourgue was born in Paris, France, on 15 April 1939. He is perhaps best known for his furniture design, particularly the bright red Djinn chairs that featured prominently in the 1968 film 2001: A Space Odyssey. The main manufacturer of his designs, Airborne International, is no longer in business, however some designs are still in production by other companies. The Djinn chair remains highly sought after as a classic example of 1960s era modern furniture design.

He was the interior designer of the French pavilions at the Montreal Expo '67 and the Osaka Expo '70.

The Finnish architect Juhani Pallasmaa, a long-time friend, remarked that "Most designers at that time were highly technical and industrial, while Olivier always had a playfulness", likening his chairs to “funny animals — tame animals”.

Mourgue died at his home in Plouguiel, France, on 5 October 2026, at the age of 87.

== Designs for Airborne ==
- Joker chair, 1959
- Djinn collection, 1963
- Tric-Trac armchair, 1963
- Whist back-to-back chair, 1964
- Bouloum anthropomorphic chaise longue, 1968
