= Lux Aeterna (Ligeti) =

1966 choral piece by György Ligeti

- Choral music by György Ligeti
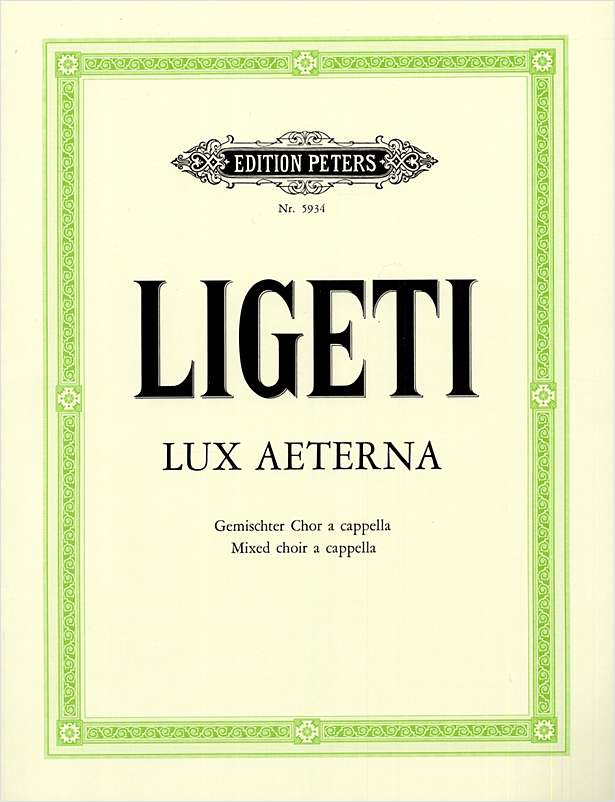
- 2002 sheet music cover
- English: Eternal Light
- Text: Lux aeterna
- Language: Latin
- Composed: 1966
- Scoring: 16-part mixed choir

Lux Aeterna is a piece for a 16-part mixed choir, written by György Ligeti in 1966. It is most famous for its use in Stanley Kubrick's 1968 film 2001: A Space Odyssey, and its 1984 sequel, Peter Hyams' 2010: The Year We Make Contact.

The text (in Latin) is from the Roman Catholic Requiem Mass: Lux aeterna luceat eis, Domine, cum sanctis tuis in aeternum, quia pius es. Requiem aeternam dona eis, Domine; et lux perpetua luceat eis, which means "May everlasting light shine upon them, O Lord, with thy saints in eternity, for thou art merciful. Grant them eternal rest, O Lord, and may everlasting light shine upon them."

The piece features many of Ligeti's characteristic styles, including:

- Micropolyphony, which Ligeti describes as "The complex polyphony of the individual parts[,] embodied in a harmonic-musical flow in which the harmonies do not change suddenly, but merge into one another; one clearly discernible interval combination is gradually blurred, and from this cloudiness it is possible to discern a new interval combination taking shape."
- Cluster chords, where every note within a given interval is sung simultaneously
- A focus on timbre rather than melody, harmony, or rhythm

== Analysis ==
The piece can be seen as divided into three distinct parts, as designated by text:

Lux aeterna luceat eis [m.1–36]: The sopranos and altos sing very similar parts in Ligeti's characteristic style of micropolyphony. Each part has the same sequence of notes, separated by small time intervals. The tenors enter about halfway through this section, singing in the same range as the women.

Domine cum sanctis tuis in aeternum... [m.37–86]: The basses enter, singing in very high falsetto, showing Ligeti's focus on timbre and texture. This is followed by a section where only the men's voices sing, and then the women enter on the text "Quia pius es." The sopranos sing "Requiem aeternam dona eis" in a high register and gradually fade away.

Domine et lux perpetua luceat eis [m.87–126]: The basses again sing the text "Domine," this time in a very low register, briefly forming the only detectable traditional chord in the whole piece (D♯ minor), together with the altos in a low register. Sopranos and tenors enter in a high register. All parts gradually fade, and the piece ends with seven bars of silence.

It is characteristic of nearly all of Ligeti's mature works that the subdivisions of the basic beat keep changing, which contributes to their beatless, floating feeling. In this piece, each of the sixteen voices is given a characteristic subdivision of the quarter-note beat:

	Sopranos	Altos	Tenors	Basses
Voice 1	sextuplets (6)	quintuplets (5)	sixteenth notes (4)	sextuplets (6)
Voice 2	quintuplets (5)	sixteenth notes (4)	sextuplets (6)	quintuplets (5)
Voice 3	sixteenth notes (4)	sextuplets (6)	quintuplets (5)	sixteenth notes (4)
Voice 4	sextuplets (6)	quintuplets (5)	sixteenth notes (4)	sextuplets (6)
