= Space Oddity (disambiguation) =

"Space Oddity" is a song by David Bowie, the first track from his eponymous 1969 album.

Space Oddity may also refer to:

- David Bowie (1969 album), the above-mentioned 1969 album by David Bowie reissued as Space Oddity from the 1972 edition onwards
- "Space Oddity", the first music video recorded in space, by astronaut Chris Hadfield, a cover of David Bowie's song. See Music in space.
- "Space Oddity" a short film by Eduardo Cemano, "Silver Phoenix" winner at the 1970 Atlanta International Film Festival
- "A Space Oddity", a fourth season episode of the TV series Code Lyoko
- "A Space Oddity", a ninth season episode of the TV series CSI: Crime Scene Investigation
- Worms: A Space Oddity, a turn based artillery game for the Nintendo Wii
- Space Oddity (film), a 2022 sci-fi romantic comedy
- Space Oddity, a 2024 sequel to Catherynne Valente's 2018 Space Opera
- Space Oddity, a cover of the original song made by David Bowie, by David Matthews.

== See also ==
- Space Odyssey (disambiguation)
- Oddity (disambiguation)
- Space (disambiguation)
