= 2000:1: A Space Felony =

2017 video game

- Developer: National Insecurities
- Publisher: Humble Games
- Engine: Unreal Engine
- Platform: Windows
- Release: WW: July 2017
- Genre: Adventure
- Mode: Single-player

2000:1: A Space Felony is a 2017 adventure video game developed by National Insecurities and published by Humble Games. It is a parody of 2001: A Space Odyssey.

== Gameplay ==
Players control a detective sent to investigate a suspicious incident on board a spaceship. The crime scene imitates that of 2001: A Space Odyssey. The human crew are dead, and the ship's artificial intelligence, named MAL, is the only witness. 2000:1: A Space Felony is an adventure game. Players photograph crime scene evidence, such as corpses found while exploring the ship, and question MAL about them. Players must then find evidence that either proves MAL is lying or being truthful. It is played in first-person.

== Development ==
This is British developer National Insecurities' first published game. They had been unsuccessfully trying to publish a game that dated to when the team members were at university. Although they had several promising leads, the deals fell through. During the time it took to follow these leads, they began development on 2000:1: A Space Felony. When Humble Bundle agreed to fund 2000:1: A Space Felony, they refocused on that instead. One of the biggest issues the team faced was replicating a famous scene in 2001 in which astronauts travel through artificial gravity generated by a centrifuge, which did not seem possible using the game's simpler physics. They eventually solved the problem by rotating the outside world around the centrifuge while players were inside it. 2000:1: A Space Felony was released in July 2017 a Humble Original. National Insecurities chose not to release the game on Steam directly after the period of exclusivity requested by Humble, as that would have put them near the Christmas season. Instead, they sold it on itch.io.

== Reception ==
PC Gamer said 2000:1: A Space Felony is "better at being a homage than a parody" and said exploring the ship recreated the feeling of watching a Kubrick film, though they found the gameplay itself less compelling. Eurogamer said the ship is "a joy to explore" and praised the art direction. They recommended it to fans of Kubrick and narrative games.
