= Micropolyphony =

Musical texture

Micropolyphony is a kind of polyphonic musical texture developed by György Ligeti, which consists of many lines of dense canons moving at different tempos or rhythms, thus resulting in tone clusters. According to David Cope, "micropolyphony resembles cluster chords, but differs in its use of moving rather than static lines"; it is "a simultaneity of different lines, rhythms, and timbres".

Differences between micropolyphonic texture and conventional polyphonic texture can be explained by Ligeti's own description:

Technically speaking I have always approached musical texture through part-writing. Both Atmosphères and Lontano have a dense canonic structure. But you cannot actually hear the polyphony, the canon. You hear a kind of impenetrable texture, something like a very densely woven cobweb. I have retained melodic lines in the process of composition, they are governed by rules as strict as Palestrina's or those of the Flemish school, but the rules of this polyphony are worked out by me. The polyphonic structure does not come through, you cannot hear it; it remains hidden in a microscopic, underwater world, to us inaudible. I call it micropolyphony (such a beautiful word!). (Ligeti, quoted in Bernard 1994, 238).

The earliest example of micropolyphony in Ligeti's work occurs in the second movement (mm 25–37) of his orchestral composition Apparitions. He used the technique in a number of his other works, including Atmosphères for orchestra; the first movement of his Requiem for soprano, mezzo-soprano, mixed choir, and orchestra; the unaccompanied choral work Lux aeterna; and Lontano for orchestra. Micropolyphony is easier with larger ensembles or polyphonic instruments such as the piano, though the Poème symphonique for a hundred metronomes creates "micropolyphony of unparallelled complexity". Many of Ligeti's piano pieces are examples of micropolyphony applied to complex "minimalist" Steve Reich and Pygmy music derived rhythmic schemes.
