= Francis Travis =

American-born Swiss orchestral conductor

Francis Travis (9 July 1921 – 28 April 2017) was an American-born Swiss orchestral conductor.

Born in Detroit, Michigan, his advanced musical studies were at the University of Zurich, with a Ph.D. in musicology after writing a dissertation on Giuseppe Verdi. He was a pupil of Hermann Scherchen, later his assistant.

He was opera director in Basel for two years, then Trier, Germany, for two years and was regular guest conductor at the Dutch National Opera in Amsterdam.

His discography includes works by Joachim Raff, Heinz Holliger with whom he collaborated, and Berlioz and Ravel. He also premiered Swiss and Swedish music.

From 1990 to 1995, he lived in Tokyo with many concerts with Japanese orchestras and choruses. He was professor for Orchestral Conducting at Tokyo National University for Music and the Fine Arts. Travis returned virtually each year to Japan for engagements, including concerts at the Kusatsu Summer Music Festival in 2001 and 2006.

Travis later lived in Munich, Germany, where he died.
