= 2001: A Space Odyssey (score) =

Unused film score composed by Alex North

The 2001: A Space Odyssey score is an unused film score composed by Alex North for Stanley Kubrick's 1968 film, 2001: A Space Odyssey.

== Background ==
In the early stages of production, Kubrick had commissioned noted Hollywood composer Alex North, who had written the score for Spartacus and also worked on Dr. Strangelove, to write the score of his upcoming film 2001: A Space Odyssey. However, during post-production, Kubrick chose to abandon North's music in favor of classical music pieces he had earlier chosen as "guide pieces" for the soundtrack. North did not know of the abandonment of the score until after he saw the film's premiere screening. The world's first exposure to North's unused music was in 1993 via Telarc's issue of the main theme on Hollywood's Greatest Hits, Vol. 2, a compilation album by Erich Kunzel and the Cincinnati Pops Orchestra. All the music North originally wrote was recorded commercially by North's friend and colleague Jerry Goldsmith with the National Philharmonic Orchestra and was released on Varèse Sarabande CDs shortly after Telarc's first theme release but before North's death. Eventually, a mono mix-down of North's original recordings, which had survived in the interim, would be released as a limited edition CD by Intrada Records.

In an interview with Michel Ciment, Kubrick explained:

However good our best film composers may be, they are not a Beethoven, a Mozart or a Brahms. Why use music which is less good when there is such a multitude of great orchestral music available from the past and from our own time? When you are editing a film, it's very helpful to be able to try out different pieces of music to see how they work with the scene...Well, with a little more care and thought, these temporary tracks can become the final score.

North, unaware that Kubrick had decided not to use the score in his film, was "devastated" at the 1968 New York City premiere screening of 2001 not to hear his work, and later offered this account of his experience: "Well, what can I say? It was a great, frustrating experience, and despite the mixed reaction to the music, I think the Victorian approach with mid-European overtones was just not in keeping with the brilliant concept of Clarke and Kubrick."

The original three-track score masters had been kept at Anvil Studios in England as late as 1980, but were later erased when the Anvil facility closed. All that remained of the original tracks were mono fold down tapes kept by North's family.

== Original theme music ==
Alex North's main title theme sounds very different from the "Also sprach Zarathustra" piece that would eventually be used in the final film. The original theme was listed on North's original score sheet as "Bones." It would have been used three times in the film, once as the main title music, and again during the opening "Dawn of Man" sequence as an ape smashes skeletal remains (hence the score sheet's title), and finally at the end of the film during the "Starchild" scene. This theme music made its public debut in early 1993 as part of the Telarc compilation CD Hollywood's Greatest Hits, Vol. 2, by Erich Kunzel and the Cincinnati Pops Orchestra, and there it was titled "Fanfare for 2001" (it would therefore be the world's first exposure to North's unused 2001 music). It would eventually be recycled by North for his later scores to Shanks, Dragonslayer and The Shoes of the Fisherman.

== Jerry Goldsmith recording ==
Alex North's 2001: The Legendary Original Score

Film score by Jerry Goldsmith and the National Philharmonic Orchestra
- Released: October 12, 1993
- Recorded: January 26–30, 1993
- Genre: Soundtrack, classical
- Length: 35:24
- Label: Varèse Sarabande
- Producer: Jerry Goldsmith

Professional ratings
Review scores
Source	Rating
Allmusic	4/5 stars

Shortly after Telarc's release of the theme, the entire original North score was released to the public. Also in 1993, an entirely new recording produced and conducted by film composer Jerry Goldsmith and performed by the National Philharmonic Orchestra was released in CD format from Varèse Sarabande Records, with the track list sequenced by co-producer Robert Tounson and CD cover art by Matthew Joseph Peak. The final track, "Main Theme," was later discovered to belong not to 2001 but to an entirely different film project, the television documentary Africa.

No.	Title	Length
1.	"Main Title"	1:37
2.	"The Foraging"	3:44
3.	"Eat Meat and the Kill"	3:27
4.	"The Bluff"	3:01
5.	"Night Terrors"	2:02
6.	"The Dawn of Man"	3:14
7.	"Space Station Docking"	2:22
8.	"Trip to the Moon"	3:21
9.	"Moon Rocket Bus"	5:01
10.	"Space Talk"	3:30
11.	"Interior Orion"	1:26
12.	"Main Theme"	2:31

== Official original recording ==
Music for 2001: A Space Odyssey

Film score by Alex North
- Released: January 26, 2007
- Recorded: January 15–16, 1968
- Studio: Denham Film, Buckinghamshire
- Genre: Soundtrack, classical
- Length: 38:54
- Label: Intrada
- Producer: Nick Redman

In January 2007, Intrada Records issued 3000 copies of a limited edition CD featuring North's original recording of the score from 1968. The release was authorized by the family of North, the estate of Stanley Kubrick, Dylanna Music, North's music publishing company, and other entities (the film's current rights holder, Turner Entertainment, did not take part in this CD release). The album features nine tracks from the score, as well as an alternate version of the track "The Foraging." In addition, the album features three bonus tracks, all of additional takes of other tracks on the album. The music is conducted by Henry Brant. Brant had helped North with the orchestration in 1967-68, as North had to be taken to the recording session in an ambulance due to muscle spasms and back pain brought on by the stress of completing the score. The CD also includes liner notes and precise cue points as to where the music would have been found in the film so that viewers can properly track these cues in sync with the DVD/Blu-ray.

No.	Title	Length
1.	"The Foraging"	3:11
2.	"The Bluff"	2:38
3.	"Night Terrors"	1:47
4.	"Bones"	1:41
5.	"Eat Meat and Kill"	4:00
6.	"Space Station Docking"	5:22
7.	"Space Talk"	3:47
8.	"Trip to Moon"	3:04
9.	"Moon Rocket Bus"	5:19
10.	"The Foraging" (alternate version) (aka The Dawn of Man)	3:08

Bonus Tracks
No.	Title	Length
11.	"Eat Meat and Kill" (take 7 – wild)	1:03
12.	"Space Station" (take 4 – partial)	2:11
13.	"Docking" (take 2)	1:15

== Reception ==
In The Art of Film Music, George Burt found North's score outstanding and deemed Kubrick's decision to abandon it was "most unfortunate", even though his choice of classical music did have merit.

On hearing the score as it might have been in the film, film scholar Gene D. Phillips argued that "it is difficult to see how North's music would have been an improvement on the background music that Kubrick finally chose for the film." Conversely, in his notes for the Jerry Goldsmith recording, Kevin Mulhall argued that "there is no doubt that 2001 would have been better if Kubrick had used North's music. Even if one likes some of the choices Kubrick made for certain individual scenes, the eclectic group of classical composers employed by the director... resulted in a disturbing melange of sounds and styles overall."

Film critic Roger Ebert noted that North's rejected score contains emotional cues to the viewer while the final music selections exist outside the action, while uplifting it. With regard to the space docking sequence, Ebert stressed the peculiar combination of slowness and majesty resulting from the choice of Strauss's Blue Danube waltz, which brought "seriousness and transcendence" to the visuals. Speaking of the music generally, Ebert wrote:

When classical music is associated with popular entertainment, the result is usually to trivialize it (who can listen to the William Tell Overture without thinking of the Lone Ranger?). Kubrick's film is almost unique in enhancing the music by its association with his images.
