= 2001: A Space Odyssey in popular culture =

In popular culture, Stanley Kubrick's 1968 science fiction film 2001: A Space Odyssey has had a significant impact in such diverse cultural forms and media as film, literature, music and technology.

== Influence on film ==
The influence of 2001 on subsequent filmmakers is considerable. Steven Spielberg, George Lucas and others, including many special effects technicians, discuss the impact the film has had on them in a featurette titled Standing on the Shoulders of Kubrick: The Legacy of 2001, included in the 2007 DVD release of the film. Spielberg calls it his film generation's "big bang", while Lucas says it was "hugely inspirational", labeling Kubrick as "the filmmaker's filmmaker". Sydney Pollack refers to it as "groundbreaking", and William Friedkin states 2001 is "the grandfather of all such films". George Lucas provided a high appraisal of Kubrick's direction of the film stating: "Stanley Kubrick made the ultimate science fiction movie, and it is going to be very hard for someone to come along and make a better movie, as far as I'm concerned. On a technical level, it can be compared, but personally I think that '2001' is far superior."

At the 2007 Venice film festival, director Ridley Scott stated he believed 2001 was the unbeatable film that in a sense killed the science fiction genre. Similarly, film critic Michel Ciment in his essay "Odyssey of Stanley Kubrick" stated, "Kubrick has conceived a film which in one stroke has made the whole science fiction cinema obsolete." However, others credit 2001 with opening up a market for films such as Close Encounters of the Third Kind, Alien, Blade Runner and Contact; proving that big-budget "serious" science-fiction films can be commercially successful, and establishing the "sci-fi blockbuster" as a Hollywood staple. Science magazine Discover's blogger Stephen Cass, discussing the considerable impact of the film on subsequent science-fiction, writes that "the balletic spacecraft scenes set to sweeping classical music, the tarantula-soft tones of HAL 9000, and the ultimate alien artifact, the Monolith, have all become enduring cultural icons in their own right."

Visual references to 2001 (including to HAL 9000), are present in both the original Star Wars film and the concluding episode, The Rise of Skywalker. The depiction of hyperspace in the original film was specifically influenced by the psychedelic visual in 2001.

== Influence on media ==
One commentator has suggested that the image of the Star Child and Earth has contributed to the rise of the "whole Earth" icon as a symbol of the unity of humanity. Writing in The Asia Pacific Journal Robert Jacobs traces the history of this icon from early cartoons and drawings of Earth to photographs of Earth from early space missions, to its historic appearance on the cover of The Whole Earth Catalog. Noting that images of the entire planet recur several times in A Space Odyssey, Jacobs writes:

The most dramatic use of the icon was in the film's conclusion. In this scene ... Bowman is reborn as the Star Child ... depicted as a fetus floating in space in an amniotic sac. The Star Child turns to consider the Whole Earth floating in front of it, both glowing a bright blue-white. The two appear as newborn versions of Man and Earth, face-to-face, ready to be born into a future of unthinkable possibilities.

== Influence on technology ==
A scene where a tablet-style device is portrayed in the film

In August 2011, in response to Apple Inc.'s patent infringement lawsuit against Samsung, the latter argued that Apple's iPad was effectively modeled on the visual tablets that appear aboard spaceship Discovery in the Space Odyssey film, which constitute prior art.

"Siri", Apple's voice assistant in iOS and macOS, features a reference to the film: it responds "I'm sorry I can't do that" when asked to "open the pod bay doors". When asked repeatedly, it may say, "Without your space helmet, you're going to find this rather... breathtaking.". The iPhone 6 version also included some references to HAL: initially, when the user said it was "good", it sometimes repeated what HAL says to the BBC interviewer about himself, then, when the user asked her to search information about HAL, it said that "We all know what happened to HAL..." or, later, that "at least, he was good at singing".

Inspired by Clarke's visual tablet device, in 1994 a European Commission-funded R&D project code named "NewsPAD" developed and pilot tested a portable 'multimedia viewer' aiming for the realisation of an electronic multimedia 'newspaper' pointing the way to a future fully interactive and highly personalised information source. Involved partners were Acorn RISC Technologies UK, Archimedes GR, Carat FR, Ediciones Primera Plana ES, Institut Català de Tecnologia ES, and TechMAPP UK.

A team from TRACLabs Inc. has developed an artificial intelligence called "CASE" (Cognitive Architecture for Space Agents), based on HAL 9000. The AI was developed to run a planetary base. In 2018, the company partnered with NASA to implement CASE into analogs, places where volunteers simulate life in outer planets.

== Sequels ==
Kubrick did not envision a sequel to 2001. Fearing the later exploitation and recycling of his material in other productions (as was done with the props from MGM's Forbidden Planet), he ordered all sets, props, miniatures, production blueprints, and prints of unused scenes destroyed. Most of these materials were lost, with some exceptions: a 2001 spacesuit backpack appeared in the "Close Up" episode of the Gerry Anderson series UFO, and one of HAL's eyepieces is in the possession of the author of Hal's Legacy, David G. Stork. In 2012 Lockheed engineer Adam Johnson, working with Frederick I. Ordway III, science adviser to Kubrick, wrote the book 2001: The Lost Science, which for the first time featured many of the blueprints of the spacecraft and film sets that previously had been thought destroyed.

Clarke wrote three sequel novels: 2010: Odyssey Two (1982), 2061: Odyssey Three (1987), and 3001: The Final Odyssey (1997). The only filmed sequel, 2010, was based on Clarke's 1982 novel and was released in 1984. Kubrick was not involved in the production of this film, which was directed by Peter Hyams in a more conventional style with more dialogue. Clarke saw it as a fitting adaptation of his novel, and had a brief cameo appearance in the film. As Kubrick had ordered all models and blueprints from 2001 destroyed, Hyams was forced to recreate these models from scratch for 2010. Hyams also claimed that he would not have made the film had he not received both Kubrick's and Clarke's blessings:

I had a long conversation with Stanley and told him what was going on. If it met with his approval, I would do the film; and if it didn't, I wouldn't. I certainly would not have thought of doing the film if I had not gotten the blessing of Kubrick. He's one of my idols; simply one of the greatest talents that's ever walked the Earth. He more or less said, "Sure. Go do it. I don't care." And another time he said, "Don't be afraid. Just go do your own movie."

The other two novels have not been adapted for the screen, although actor Tom Hanks has expressed interest in possible adaptations.

In 2012, two screenplay adaptations of both 2061 and 3001 were posted on the 2001:Exhibit website, in the hopes of generating interest in both MGM and Warner Bros. to adapt the last two novels into films.

== Comics adaptations ==
René Bratonne made a French newspaper comic adaptation of this film, assisted by Pierre Leguen, Claude Pascal and his son, who worked under the pseudonym Jack de Brown.

In 1968, Howard Johnson's released a homonymous comic adaptation on their children's menu.

Beginning in 1976, Marvel Comics published a comic adaptation of the film written and drawn by Jack Kirby, and a 10-issue monthly series expanding on the ideas of the film and novel, also created by Kirby. When Marvel's license to publish 2001 comics expired, one of the characters, Machine Man, was an original creation by Kirby and therefore belonged to the company's IP, and was made into a part of the Marvel Universe.

In 1985, Marvel released the adaptation of 2010: Odyssey 2 as a two-issues limited series called 2010. It was written by J. M. DeMatteis, with art by Joe Barney and Larry Hama, colors by Tom Palmer and letters by Rick Parker.

== Game adaptations ==
In 1976 Williams Electronics released a pinball machine based on Robert McCall’s poster for the movie: Space Odyssey, with the 4-player version being called Space Mission. It was designed by Steve Kordek, with art from Christian Marche.

The movie has also been adapted to tabletop games. In 1984, TSR released the role-playing game adaptations 2001: A Space Odyssey and 2010: Odyssey Two Adventure using the Star Frontiers system. On 4 June 2025, Maestro Media released a board game adaptation called 2001: A Space Odyssey | The Board Game, designed by Phil Walker-Harding. One player, that controls HAL 9000, must sabotage Discovery, while the other players, that control the crew, must coordinate with each other to safeguard the ship and complete their mission.

Technosoft has adapted the movie to a computer game twice for FM-7 and other PCs. On 2001: A Space Odyssey (1980), Dr. Bowman must deactivate HAL 9000 before the spaceship Discovery is exploded. On the sequel 2001: A Space Odyssey Part II, Dr. Bowman must touch the monolith while running away from an aggressive alien.

== Action figures ==
There have been several action figures based on the movie. MediCom released the colorful spacesuits on their MAFEX lineup (2017) and a prop-size replica of HAL 9000 (2022). HobbyLink Japan partnered with GomoraKick to release scale model replicas, including from Discovery One for their HLJ Select lineup (2019). Super7 released three astronauts from the movie and Moon Watcher on their 2001: A Space Odyssey ULTIMATES! lineup (2022). Executive Replicas released a line for miniature replicas of the movie (2024).

== Parodies and homages ==
2001 has been the frequent subject of both parody and homage, sometimes extensively and other times briefly, employing both its distinctive music and iconic imagery.

=== In advertising and print ===
- In 1966, Parker Brothers released an updated, 4-player version of the board game Pan-Kai called Universe, designed by Alex Randolph. Originally, Hal 9000 would play the pattern game with Discovery's crew, but it was substituted by chess instead. Nevertheless, Parker Brothers released new versions using promotional material from the movie.
- Mad magazine #125 (March 1969) featured a spoof called 201 Minutes of a Space Idiocy written by Dick DeBartolo and illustrated by Mort Drucker. In the final panels it is revealed that the monolith is a giant book entitled "How to Make an Incomprehensible Science Fiction Movie & Several Million Dollars by Writer/Producer/Director Stanley Kubrick". It was reprinted in various special issues, in the MAD About the Sixties book, and partially in the book The Making of Kubrick's 2001.
- The August 1971 album Who's Next by The Who featured as its cover artwork a photograph of a concrete slab at Easington Colliery with the band apparently doing up their trouser zips. The decision to photograph this "monolith" image while on their way to a concert followed discussion between John Entwistle and Keith Moon about Kubrick's film.
- Thought to be the first time Kubrick gave permission for his work to be re-used, Apple Inc.'s 1999 website advertisement "It was a bug, Dave" was made by meticulously recreating the appearance of HAL. Launched during the era of concerns over Y2K bugs, the ad implied that HAL's weird behavior was caused by a Y2K bug, before driving home the point that "only Macintosh was designed to function perfectly".
- A teaser trailer for the film Barbie parodies the opening sequence of 2001.

=== In film and television ===
- Monty Python's Flying Circus contains a short, animated spoof of 2001 in the episode "A Book at Bedtime". London Magazine cited the sketch in 2006, commenting on the broader use of Ligeti's music beyond that by Kubrick.
- Woody Allen cast actor Douglas Rain (HAL in Kubrick's film) in an uncredited part as the voice of the controlling computer in the closing sequences of his 1973 science-fiction comedy Sleeper.
- A series short cartoon segments for The Electric Company, referred to as the "monolith" series, feature the monolith (colored white) cracking and crumbling down due to seismic disturbance to the first Sunrise Fanfare of Also Sprach Zarathustra followed by repetitive kettledrum thumping, eventually revealing a small word or diphthong, subsequently pronounced by a deistic voice ("ee", "oo", "ow", "all", "alk", "scram", "was").
- Sesame Street aired two additional Sesame Workshop "monolith" shorts in the same vein as the earlier The Electric Company ones; "me" and "amor". A segment from the 1992 season parodies 2001, in which Telly sees two monoliths appear in the arbor area (the number 11) and describes it as making one feel...elevenny.
- Peter Sellers starred in Hal Ashby's 1979 comedy-drama Being There about a simple-minded middle-aged gardener who has lived his entire life in the townhouse of his wealthy employer. In the scene where he first leaves the house and ventures into the wide world for the first time, the soundtrack plays a jazzy version of Strauss' Also sprach Zarathustra arranged by Eumir Deodato. Film critic James A. Davidson writing for the film journal Images suggests "When Chance emerges from his home into the world, Ashby suggests his childlike nature by using Richard Strauss' Thus Spake Zarathustra as ironic background music, linking his hero with Kubrick's star baby in his masterpiece 2001: A Space Odyssey."
- Mel Brooks' 1981 satirical film History of the World, Part I opens with a parody of Kubrick's "Dawn of Man" sequence, followed by the parody of One Million Years BC, narrated by Orson Welles. DVDVerdict describes this parody as "spot on". A similar spoof of the "Dawn of Man" sequence also opened Ken Shapiro's 1974 comedy The Groove Tube in which the monolith was replaced by a television set. (The film is mostly a parody of television. Film and Filming held that after this opening, the film slid downhill.)
- Among spoof references to several science-fiction films and shows, Airplane II (1982) features a computer called ROK 9000 in control of a Moon shuttle which malfunctions and kills crew members, which several reviewers found reminiscent of HAL.
- Mystery Science Theater 3000, which also frequently references and spoofs the film, had the design of its main setting, the starship Satellite of Love, based on the bone-shaped satellite featured in the match cut from prehistoria to the future. The one-eyed design of the robot Gypsy led the show to do various scenes comparing it to HAL, including a scene from the 1996 feature film, where the opening featuring Mike Nelson jogging along the walls of the Satellite of Love parodies the scene where Frank Poole does the same in the Discovery.
- A Square One Television segment that illustrates the concept of infinity parodies the film.
- Matt Groening's animated series The Simpsons, of which Kubrick was a fan, and Futurama frequently reference 2001, along with other Kubrick films. In the opening of The Simpsons episode "Lisa's Pony", the "Dawn of Man" sequence from 2001 is recreated with primates that include Homer; while all the primates are inspired to new levels of intellect by the monolith, the Homer primate uses it as a back rest to take a nap. The Simpsons had in the 1994 episode "Deep Space Homer" Bart throwing a felt-tip marker into the air; in slow motion it rotates, before a match cut replaces it with a cylindrical satellite. In 2004 Empire magazine listed this as the third best film parody of the entire run of the show. The satellite docking sequence is also parodied as Homer Simpson floats through the spaceship eating potato chips. HAL's ship omnipotence, eye, murderous breakdown, and eventual disconnection are parodied through the Ultrahouse in the 2001 episode "Treehouse of Horror XII", and the new house décor itself is reminiscent of the film's spaceship interiors. In the 2002 Futurama episode "Love and Rocket" a sentient spaceship revolts in a manner similar to HAL. Games Radar listed this as number 17 in its list of 20 Funniest Futurama parodies, while noting that Futurama has referenced Space Odyssey on several other occasions.
- In Clueless (1997), a black blocky phone rings, which is framed to look like the monolith, while the 2001 film score is played.
- The 2000 film 2001: A Space Travesty has been occasionally alluded to as a full parody of Kubrick's film, both because of its title and star Leslie Nielsen's many previous films which were full parodies of other films. However, Space Travesty only makes occasional references to Kubrick's material, its "celebrities are really aliens" jokes resembling those in the 1997 film Men in Black. Canadian reviewer Jim Slotek said, "It's not really a spoof of 2001, or anything in particular. There's a brief homage at the start, and one scene in a shuttle en route to the Moon that uses The Blue Danube... The rest is a patched together plot."
- In the 2000 South Park episode "Trapper Keeper", an interaction between Eric Cartman and Kyle Broflovski parodies the conversation between HAL and Bowman within the inner core.
- In the conclusion of the miniseries Farscape: The Peacekeeper Wars, imaginary antagonist Harvey "dies" in the room of Bowman's transformation, which is recreated in protagonist John Crichton's mind from his memory of the film, monolith included.
- Tim Burton's 2005 Charlie and the Chocolate Factory has a scene (using actual footage from A Space Odyssey) in which the monolith morphs into a chocolate bar. Catholic News wrote that the film "had subtle and obvious riffs on everything from the saccharine Disney "Small World" exhibit to Munchkinland to, most brilliantly, a hilarious takeoff on Kubrick's 2001: A Space Odyssey."
- Andrew Stanton, the director of WALL-E (2008), revealed in an interview with Wired magazine that his film was in many ways his homage to Space Odyssey, Alien, Blade Runner, Close Encounters and several other science-fiction films. The reviewer for USA Today described the resemblance of the spaceship's computer, Auto, to HAL. WALL-E also uses Richard Strauss's Also sprach Zarathustra during its climax in a similar manner to 2001. The same year saw the release of the much less successful film Eagle Eye, about which The Charlotte Observer said that, like 2001, it featured a "red-eyed, calm-voiced supercomputer that took human life to protect what it felt were higher objectives".
- In an episode of 13 Reasons Why titled "The Smile at the End of the Dock", one of the characters sees a matinee of the film to pass time during the summer.
- The Bluey episode "Sleepytime" references the "Star Gate" sequence in a scene where the character Bingo travels on a comet through space mirroring the sequence.
- James Gunn's 2023 Marvel Cinematic Universe film Guardians of the Galaxy Vol. 3 features colorful spacesuits that were misidentified by fans as a reference to Among Us. Gunn confirmed on Twitter that the suits were instead based on 2001: A Space Odyssey.
- The 2023 film Barbie opens as a direct parody of the "Dawn of Man" sequence.
- The cinematography of second season of the 2021 TV show Loki season 2 had influence from the making of 2001.

=== In music ===
- David Bowie's first single to chart, "Space Oddity" in 1969, was inspired by the film.
- Roger Waters' 1992 album Amused to Death was remixed/remastered in 2015 to contain samples of HAL 9000, specifically describing his mind being taken away, at the beginning of "Perfect Sense, Part I".
- Phish occasionally refers to their rendition of the opening fanfare of Also sprach Zarathustra as "2001", in reference to the film. They also referenced this connection by performing the song at what is believed to be their 2001st show.
- The album art and merchandise for Glass Animals' album "I Love You So F***ing Much" contain many visual references to 2001: A Space Odyssey."
- The YouTube channel Epic Rap Battles of History released on 14 July 2012 a rap battle named "Steve Jobs vs. Bill Gates", where Jobs dies and becomes HAL 9000.
- The New York Philharmonic performed the movie's soundtrack in January 2013 as part of "The Art of the Score: Film Week at the Philharmonic".
- The Adelaide Symphony Orchestra and Adelaide Chamber Singers made a live-to-picture performance in March 2013 as part of "London's South Bank: 2001 A Space Odyssey – Live".
- The Chicago Symphony Orchestra made a live-to-picture performance on 9 and 10 January 2026 as part of "2001: A Space Odyssey Live".

=== In software and video games ===
- Video game director Hideo Kojima has cited 2001: A Space Odyssey as his favorite film of all time and is frequently referenced in the Metal Gear series; Otacon is named after HAL and Solid Snake's real name is Dave.
- 2000:1: A Space Felony is a parody of the film.

=== In spaceflight ===
- 2001 Mars Odyssey is a NASA probe which was launched in 2001 and is currently orbiting Mars. It was named in tribute to the film.

=== 50th anniversary celebration ===
In celebration of the 50th anniversary of the film's release, an exhibit called "The Barmecide Feast" opened on April 8, 2018 in the Smithsonian Institution's National Air and Space Museum. The exhibit features a fully realized, full-scale reflection of the neo-classical hotel room from the penultimate scene in the film.

=== Utah monolith ===
In 2020, a metallic pillar of unknown origin was discovered in Utah. It has been compared to the monolith in 2001: A Space Odyssey.
