= 2010 Academy Awards =

2010 Academy Awards may refer to:

- 82nd Academy Awards, the Academy Awards ceremony which took place in 2010, honoring the best in film for 2009.
- 83rd Academy Awards, the Academy Awards ceremony which took place in 2011, honoring the best in film for 2010.
- Academy Award nominations for the 1984 film 2010: The Year We Make Contact
