= Space Odyssey =

Science fiction media franchise

- Created by: Arthur C. Clarke; Stanley Kubrick
- Original work: 2001: A Space Odyssey (1968)
- Owners: Metro-Goldwyn-Mayer; Hawk Films (1968–2001); Warner Bros. Pictures (through Turner Entertainment Co.)
- Years: 1968–1997

Print publications
- Novels: 2001: A Space Odyssey (1968); 2010: Odyssey Two (1982); 2061: Odyssey Three (1987); 3001: The Final Odyssey (1997)
- Comics: 2001: A Space Odyssey (1976–77); 2010 (1984)

Films and television
- Films: 2001: A Space Odyssey (1968); 2010: The Year We Make Contact (1984)

Games
- Video games: 2010: The Text Adventure Game (1984); 2010: The Graphic Action Game (1984)

Audio
- Soundtrack: 2001: A Space Odyssey (1968)

Space Odyssey is a science fiction media franchise created by writer Arthur C. Clarke and filmmaker Stanley Kubrick, consisting of four novels and two film adaptations. The first novel was based on Kubrick's film and published after the release of the film. The second novel was made into a feature film directed by Peter Hyams and released in 1984.

== Literature ==
Novels:

- 2001: A Space Odyssey (1968)
- 2010: Odyssey Two (1982)
- 2061: Odyssey Three (1987)
- 3001: The Final Odyssey (1997)

Nonfiction:

- The Lost Worlds of 2001 (1972)

Comic books:

- 2001: A Space Odyssey – ten-issue Marvel comic book series based upon the 1968 film of the same name that ran from 1976 to 1977
- 2010 – based on the 1984 film of the same name, originally published in Marvel Super Special #37, then again as a two-issue miniseries; both versions published by Marvel Comics in 1984

== Video games ==
- 2010: The Text Adventure Game A text-based video game based on 2010: The Year We Make Contact. It was released alongside the film in 1984.
- 2010: The Graphic Action Game A 2010: The Text Adventure Game graphical version was released for the Coleco Adam. Both games were developed by Coleco Industries. Just like the previous game, they are based on the 2010: The Year We Make Contact film.

== Cancelled sequels ==
It was reported on Yahoo! in 2000 that Metro-Goldwyn-Mayer and Tom Hanks were in discussions regarding turning both 2061: Odyssey Three and 3001: The Final Odyssey into movies (Hanks would reportedly play Frank Poole in the 3001 film). An update in 2001 stated that there was no further development on the project.

In November of 2014, it was reported that the U.S. cable channel Syfy had ordered a miniseries adaptation of 3001: The Final Odyssey into production, planned for broadcast in 2015. The miniseries would be executive-produced by Ridley Scott, David W. Zucker and Stuart Beattie; the latter would also be the primary script-writer. The estates of both Clarke and Kubrick were reported as having "offered their full support", but the extent of their involvement was not known at the time. In February 2016, the series was mentioned as one of Syfy's "in development pipeline" projects during their press release for Prototype, though no further announcements have been made since that time.

== Development ==
The 2001 screenplay was written by Clarke and Kubrick jointly, inspired in The Sentinel that an alien civilization left an object on the Moon to alert them to humankind's attainment of space travel. In addition, the 1953 short story Encounter in the Dawn contains elements of the first section of the film, in which the ancestors of humans are apparently given an evolutionary nudge by extraterrestrials. The opening part of another Clarke story, "Transience", has plot elements set in about the same time in human history, but is otherwise unrelated.

The 1972 book The Lost Worlds of 2001 contains material that did not make it into the book or film.

Clarke's first attempt to write the sequel to 2001 was a film screenplay, though he ultimately wrote a novel instead that was published in 1982. Clarke was not directly involved in the production of the second film, although he did communicate with writer/director Peter Hyams a great deal during the production via the then-pioneering medium of e-mail (as published in the book The Odyssey File) and also made a non-speaking cameo appearance in the film. Kubrick had no involvement in the 2010 novel or film, or any of the later projects.

The Space Odyssey series combines several science-fiction narrative conventions with a metaphysical tone. Since the stories and settings in the books and films all diverge, Clarke suggested that the continuity of the series represents happenings in a set of parallel universes. One notable example is that in the 2001 novel, the voyage was to the planet Saturn. During production of the film, it was decided that the special effects for Saturn's rings would be too expensive, so the voyage in the film is to Jupiter instead. The second book, 2010, retcons the storyline of the first book to make the destination Jupiter as seen in the film.

Clarke stated that the Time Odyssey novels are an "orthoquel" – a neologism coined by Clarke for this purpose, combining the word sequel with ortho-, the Greek prefix meaning "straight" or "perpendicular", and alluding to the fact that time is orthogonal to space in relativity theory – to the Space Odyssey series.

== Main characters ==
- HAL 9000 is a sentient supercomputer that becomes the primary antagonist of 2001: A Space Odyssey. HAL is also in the sequel novels and the film sequel 2010. In both films he is voiced by actor Douglas Rain.
- Dr. David "Dave" Bowman serves as the protagonist of 2001: A Space Odyssey. The character later appears in the sequel story released first as a book, 2010: Odyssey Two, and the film 2010: The Year We Make Contact, albeit as a non-corporeal entity. Bowman returned in two more books by Arthur C. Clarke, 2061: Odyssey Three and 3001: The Final Odyssey. In the forewords to both 2010 and 2061, Clarke makes it clear that the plots of the films and books do not necessarily follow a linear arc, and should be seen as taking place in parallel universes, or as being variations of a main theme; consequently there are apparent inconsistencies in Bowman's characterization throughout the series. In the two movies, Bowman is portrayed by Keir Dullea.
- Dr. Heywood R. Floyd first appears in 2001: A Space Odyssey as being in charge of the mission to investigate the alien Monolith found on the Moon. He subsequently appears as the protagonist of 2010: Odyssey Two and 2061: Odyssey Three. Floyd was born in 1958 in America, and by 1999 is chairman of the National Council of Astronautics, overseeing all American spaceflight operations. He has two daughters (only one in the films) and was widowed when his wife Marion died in a plane crash. In 2010: The Year We Make Contact, Floyd has a new wife and a five-year-old son named Christopher. Floyd was portrayed by William Sylvester in the film version of 2001: A Space Odyssey and by Roy Scheider in 2010: The Year We Make Contact.
- Dr. Frank Poole is an astronaut aboard Discovery One on the first crewed mission to Jupiter in 2001: A Space Odyssey (Saturn in the novel). He and Dave Bowman are the only crew members who were not put on board in suspended animation (hibernation). His boyhood hometown was Flagstaff, Arizona, where he visited the Lowell Observatory at its museums on many occasions. These visits sparked his interest in astronomy and astronautics, and hence he went to college to study these subjects. He is the main character of 3001: The Final Odyssey. In Stanley Kubrick's 2001: A Space Odyssey, Poole was portrayed by Gary Lockwood. Tom Hanks once expressed interest in directing a film version of 3001, in which he would have played Poole, but this never came to fruition.
- Walter Curnow appears in the book and movie versions of 2010: Odyssey Two as the American engineer who designs Discovery and helps to build Discovery II to go back to Jupiter. When the joint Soviet-American mission on the Leonov is planned instead, Curnow is one of the three American experts to go on the trip, along with Heywood Floyd and Dr. Chandra. Curnow is one of the first people to set foot on Discovery again, along with Maxim Brailovsky. Due to his engineering expertise, Discovery becomes operational again. In the 1984 film adaptation, 2010: The Year We Make Contact, Curnow is portrayed by John Lithgow.
- Dr. Sivasubramanian Chandrasegaram Pillai (often abbreviated to Dr. Chandra) is mentioned in the novel of 2001: A Space Odyssey as a scientist who instructed HAL 9000 in its basic functions. Pillai is a main character in 2010: Odyssey Two, where he is established to be the creator of HAL and joins the Russian-American expedition to Jupiter on board the Soviet spacecraft Leonov. In 2010: The Year We Make Contact, Pillai is portrayed by Bob Balaban.
