= 2001: A Space Odyssey (comics) =

Comic book series by Jack Kirby

- 2001: A Space Odyssey [Marvel Treasury Special] (1976); Art by Jack Kirby and Dan Adkins

Publication information
- Publisher: Marvel Comics
- Schedule: Monthly
- Formats: Original material for the series has been published as a set of ongoing series and one-shot comics.
- Genre: Science fiction
- Publication date: Treasury; 1976; Series; December 1976–September 1977
- Number of issues: Treasury; 1 Series; 10

Creative team
- Writer(s): Jack Kirby
- Penciller(s): Jack Kirby
- Inker(s): List: Treasury Frank Giacoia Series Mike Royer
- Letterer(s): List: Treasury John Costanza Series Mike Royer
- Colorist(s): List: Treasury Marie Severin Jack Kirby Series George Roussos Janice Cohen Glynis Wein Petra Goldberg
- Editor(s): List: Treasury Jack Kirby Series Jack Kirby Archie Goodwin

2001: A Space Odyssey is an oversized American comic book adaptation of the 1968 film of the same name as well as a ten-issue monthly series which expanded upon the concepts presented in the Stanley Kubrick film and the novel by Arthur C. Clarke. Jack Kirby wrote and pencilled both the adaptation and the series, which were published by Marvel Comics beginning in 1976. The adaptation was part of the agreement of Kirby's return to Marvel.

== Treasury edition ==
In the 70s, Marvel Comics made investments on licensed comics based on sci-fi works, adapting movies and novels such as Star Wars, Godzilla, Planet of the Apes, and Logan's Run. According to Mark Evanier, Marvel had acquired the rights to 2001: A Space Odyssey from Metro-Goldwyn-Mayer in the mid-70s and there was a general agreement inside of the company that Jack Kirby, who was working for the rival company DC Comics at the time, should be the one to adapt the film. Kirby accepted, but he was unhappy to work on an adaptation and decided to narrate the story from his viewpoint. He has taken "three or four weeks" to finalize the story, and later declared that it was "an honor, but not a lot of fun".

The story is a close adaptation of the events of the film, but differs in the fact that Kirby incorporated additional dialog from two other sources: the novel and a copy of an earlier draft script of the film that included the more colloquial-sounding version of HAL 9000, as originally voiced by actor Martin Balsam before he was replaced by Douglas Rain. In addition, the comic narrative chooses to use more dialog than visual effects when compared to the movie. The captions describe the characters' thoughts and feelings, a significantly different approach from that taken by the film. Kirby has also chosen to portray the characters as more beefy and emotional than their counterparts from the film. Kirby has also implemented his own art style, diminishing the realism presented in the movie. He often depicted the space and planets with pink, purple, blue and other strong colors, with the presence of "Kirby Krackles" in several panels. Sometimes, he had also used photo-collage panels. Marvel published the adaptation in its then-common treasury edition format featuring tabloid-sized pages of roughly twice the size of a standard American comic book. It also contained a 10-page article entitled "2001: A Space Legacy" written by David Anthony Kraft.

== Monthly series ==
Shortly after the publication of the treasury edition, Marvel asked Kirby to explore the concepts of 2001 in a monthly comic book series of the same name. According to Evanier, Kirby thought that adapting the movie into a series was a bad idea, but he accepted the project anyways. There was some doubt if original characters would be considered a trademark from Marvel or MGM, so Kirby was dissuaded from creating new, recurring characters.

Up until issue #6, Kirby retold the tale of the monolith, creating new characters that are transformed into New Seed. Here, Kirby followed the pattern established in the film, replaying the same idea with different characters in different situations, both ancient and futuristic.

The first issue was cover dated December 1976. Once again the reader encounters a prehistoric man ("Beast-Killer") who lives in what is going to become New Orleans. He gains new insight upon encountering a Monolith as did Moon-Watcher in the film, and learns how to create and use weapons. The scene then shifts, where Woodrow Decker, a descendant of Beast-Killer, and his companion Maston are in a mission to locate alien life. They crash in an asteroid between Mars and Jupiter, where they find ruins of an ancient civilization. Maston's life support is crashed by an alien and the ruins start to collapse. Decker runs for his life and encounters the Monolith. It then transforms him into a Star Child, called in the comic a "New Seed".

Issue #2 introduces the story of "Vira, the She-Demon". It starts with a starving prehistoric woman called Vira accidentally entering a ritual cave full of skulls while looking for food in the volcanic region that will eventually be Italy. She is caught by other prehistoric men, but she scapes by setting a skull on fire and thus making them believe it came back to life. She overhears them talking about a stone spirit and finds the monolith, that teaches her how to use religion for her survival. She then covers herself with bones and declares to be an emissary of the stone spirit. The prehistoric men venerate her out of fear, and the tribe prospers. One of Vira's descendants, Vera Gentry, is sent by NASA to the Jovian moon Ganymede to look for UFOs. She finds it, but the aliens are hostile and destroy her life support. Vera finds the monolith while trying to survive the attack and is transformed into a New Seed. Sequart Organization has pointed that Vira is probably based on Shanna the She-Devil, that had her debut five years prior.

Issues #3–4 bring forth a two-part story. "Marak the Merciless!", follows the story of Marak, a warrior from 203,000 B.C. Marak was the first human to organize warfare and gained his life by pillaging farm villages. During one of his battles, he is attacked by an old inventor called Egel with a bronze cub. Impressed by the strength of the cub, he follows Egel to a stone spirit (the monolith) and has a vision of a girl named Jalessa. Decided to meet her, he learns with Egel how to forge bronze and humanity transitions from Stone Age to Bronze Age. He also domesticates horses and orders his men to spare part of his enemies, to convert them to his own army. He then gets anxious to meet Jalessa, and orders Egel to find a way to transport goods to feed his army. Egel makes stone casks to protect the food, but Marak gets mad as it would be too heavy for transportation. He throws one of the casks on the floor and the lid rolls. Egel sees what happened and thus invents the wheel. On the "Wheels of Death!", Marak invades Jalessa's lands. Jalessa consults the Monolyth and meets Marak unarmed. They both agree to stop fighting and join in an alliance. In 2001, Marak's descendant Hebert Marik is NASA's captain of Liberty I Space Sation, that is flying near Mars. Liberty I is about to be destroyed by a meteor shower, so Marik orders the crew to evacuate and remains alone in the station. He then identifies a weird signal outside the station and thus meets the Monolyth. The process to transform him into a New Seed begins. He transforms into Marak and marries Jalessa, but the transformation fails, as he doesn't respond to the fast-aging process.

In issues #5–6, Kirby introduces the two-part story. "Norton of New York 2040 A.D." starts with Harvey Norton, a comic book fan, performing as "The White Zero" trying to rescue princess Adora from an alien called Death Master in a simulation at the Comicsville amusement park, located in New York. The performance doesn't go as planned, but Norton briefly meets the monolyth. New York in 2040 is filled with pollution, fake landscapes and advertisements. Feeling his life is an illusion, he proceeds to enlist for space exploration and ends up finding a capsule with a female alien inside. On "Inter-Galactica", a hostile ship attacks Norton's ship, and he flees with the alien, thinking she is a princess. During the persecution, both were about to escape using a teleporter, but it is destroyed by the enemy's ship just before Norton can come in. He then finds the monolith and is transformed into a New Seed after living an illusion as the hero "Captain Cosmic". Wired has classified the story as "a cross between Marvel's Inhumans and DC's New Gods".

In issue #7 (June 1977), the comic presents a story called "The New Seed". It opens with the transformation of the astronaut Gordon Pruett into a New Seed who then travels the galaxy. He then reaches a planet destroyed by war and witness the suffering that living beings impose to each other. He takes the essence of the two last members of their species, a pair of doomed lovers, and uses it in a planet from Epsilon Eridan star system to seed it with the potential for life. According to Cracked.com, Kirby combined several of his sci-fi heroes, including Silver Surfer, Human Torch and Uatu the Watcher, to create New Seed's personality and powers.

In issue #8 (July 1977), Kirby introduces Mister Machine, an advanced robot designated X-51. All the other robots in the X series go on a rampage as they achieve sentience and are destroyed. X-51, supported by both the love of his creator Dr. Abel Stack and an encounter with a Monolith, transcends the malfunction that destroyed his siblings. After the death of Dr. Stack, X-51 takes the name Aaron Stack and begins to blend into humanity. Issues #9 and 10, the final issues of the series, continue the story of X-51 as he flees destruction at the hands of the Army. On the final panels of the comic, Mister Machine abandons his sidekick Jerry and his family, and his solo magazine, Machine Man (1978), is announced.

== Legacy ==
The story was obfuscated by others of Kirby's comic books, such as X-Men, Black Panther and Thor, and turned out to be one of his most forgotten creations. According to Kubrick scholar James Fenwick, there was no trace of the comics on the Kubrick Archive and he was unsure if Stanley Kubrick was even aware of its existence. Nevertheless, one of Kirby's original characters, Mister Machine, was renamed as Machine Man and got his own series, thus being officially incorporated into the Marvel Universe.

A reprint was never released due to copyright issues. Marvel owns part of the trademark, but even though the original deal was made with MGM, Warner Bros. later became the owner of the franchise. Kubrick's family also holds the rights of the franchise.

Elements of the adaptation have appeared in other Marvel comic books. A New Seed appears in Deadpool #20 (December 2013), and in X-51 #12 (July 2000) Uatu the Watcher reveals that the Monolyth was created by the Watchers.

2001 sequel 2010: Odyssey Two was adapted by Marvel in 1985 as a limited series.

== Reviews ==
=== Treasury Special ===
Randolph Hoppe, director of the Jack Kirby Museum and Research Center, has declared that "2001 really is Kirby doing the best little fables or stories that are both mythological and science-fictional. It just nails him, in a way. It's pretty great."

Mike Avila has said on Syfy.com it "contains some of the most spectacular art of Kirby's career and is indeed maybe his final epic art deliverance."

Ashley Land has praised the comic on Comic Book Resources, saying that "no matter how many issues he [Jack Kirby] was given, he never would have been able to capture the slow-burning, dialogue-driven nature of Kubrick's film, so he didn't try. Instead, flipping from one page to the next serves up a visual treat more than anything else, hosting some of the most stunning visuals the artist ever drew."

Julian Darius has said on Sequart Organization that it is "the most bizarre sort of failure — a crazy comic that by all rights shouldn't exist but somehow does, like a continuation of Citizen Kane by Frank Miller. It's an oddity produced by a sci-fi time rift, or a product of a parallel universe."

=== Monthly series ===
Jon Hogan has said on Cracked.com that the monthly version is overall good, but the beginning is weak, getting better when Kirby adds his superhero-style stories. He has also criticized Jerry, Mister Machine's sidekick, for having too many narrative exposition dialogs.

== In other media ==
Allusions are made to the series in the Agents of S.H.I.E.L.D. season 3 episode "4,722 Hours".

== See also ==
- List of comics based on films
- Marvel Treasury Edition
