= The Lost Worlds of 2001 =

1972 Arthur C. Clarke book

- Cover of the 1972 Signet book
- Author: Arthur C. Clarke
- Language: English
- Genre: Science fiction
- Published: 1972
- Publisher: New American Library
- Publication place: United Kingdom
- Media type: Print (Paperback)
- Pages: 240

The Lost Worlds of 2001 is a 1972 book by English writer Arthur C. Clarke, published as an accompaniment to the novel 2001: A Space Odyssey.

The book consists in part of behind-the-scenes notes from Clarke concerning scriptwriting (and rewriting) for the film 2001: A Space Odyssey, as well as production issues. The core of the book, however, comprises excerpts from the proto-novel and an early screenplay that did not make it into the final version. Alternative settings for launch preparation, the EVA scene where astronaut Frank Poole is lost, and varying dialogues concerning the HAL 9000 unit are among the elements and scenes featured.

Also included is the original 1948 short story "The Sentinel", the cornerstone of the film's script.
