= Monolith (Space Odyssey) =

Fictional artefacts from Arthur C. Clarke's Space Odyssey novels

- Space Odyssey element
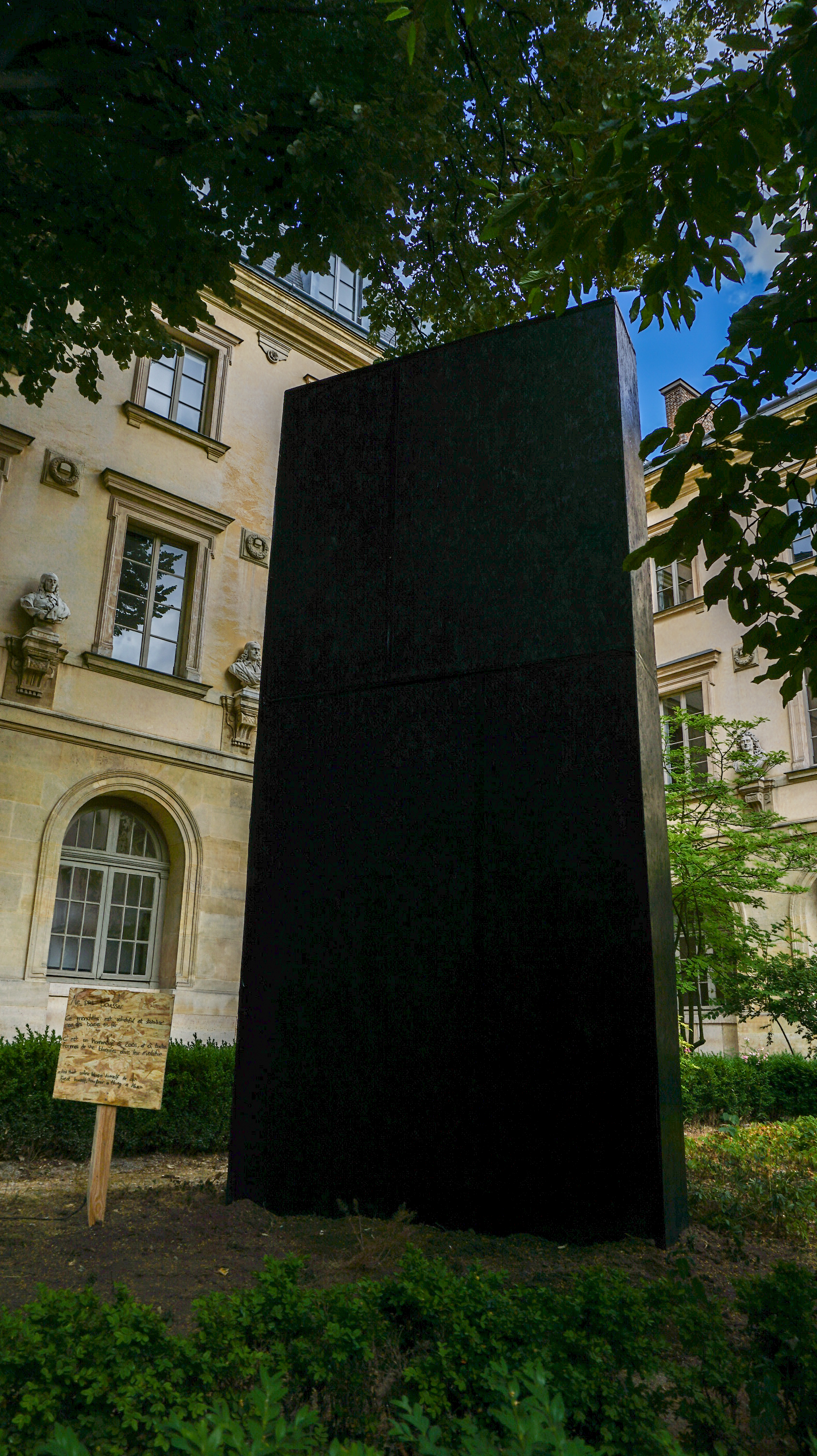
- A replica monolith prop at École Normale Supérieure in Paris, 2020
- Publisher: Stanley Kubrick Productions
- First appearance: 2001: A Space Odyssey; (1968)
- Created by: Stanley Kubrick; Arthur C. Clarke
- Genre: Science fiction

In-universe information
- Type: Machine
- Function: varies

In Arthur C. Clarke's Space Odyssey series, Monoliths are machines in black cuboids whose sides extend in the precise ratio of 1 : 4 : 9 (1^{2} : 2^{2} : 3^{2}) built by an unseen extraterrestrial species whom Clarke dubbed the Firstborn and who he suggests are the earliest highly intelligent species to evolve in the Milky Way. In the series of novels (and the films based on these), three Monoliths are discovered in the Solar System by australopithecines and their human descendants. The characters' responses to their discoveries drive the plot of the series and influence its fictional history, particularly by encouraging humanity to progress with technological development.

The first monolith appears at the beginning of the story, four million years before the present era. It is discovered by a group of australopithecines and triggers a shift in evolution, starting with the ability to use tools and weaponry. It is later revealed that thousands of other Monoliths exist elsewhere in the galaxy.

== Origins ==
The species that built the Monoliths is never described in detail, but some knowledge of its existence is given to Dave Bowman after he is transported by the star-gate to the "cosmic zoo", as detailed in the 1968 novel 2001: A Space Odyssey and its 1982 sequel, 2010: Odyssey Two. The existence of this species is only hypothesized by the rest of humanity, but it is obvious because the Monolith was immediately identified as an artefact of non-human origin.

The species that built the Monoliths developed interstellar travel millions or billions of years before the present time. In the novels, Clarke refers to them as the "Firstborn", since they were quite possibly the first sapient species to possess a significant capability of interstellar travel. Members of this species explored the universe in the search of knowledge, especially about other intelligent species.

While these early explorers discovered that life was quite common, they observed that intelligent life was often stunted in its development, or else died out prematurely. Hence, they set about fostering it. Though not at all morphologically similar to humans, the Firstborn were nonetheless creatures of "flesh and blood", and like humans, were originally mortal.

However, the evolutionary development projects they began would by their nature require very long time spans to complete, far longer than the lives of their creators. Therefore, the aliens created increasingly complex automated machines to oversee and carry out their projects over the eons. When they encountered a living world that had features in favour of the evolution of intelligent life, they left behind the Monoliths as remote observers that were also capable of taking a variety of actions according to their creators' wishes. One such planet, encountered when it was still quite young, was Earth. They also observed Jupiter and its watery moon, Europa. The decaying ecology of Mars was also visited, but passed over in favour of more fruitful locations like Earth. The Firstborn left behind three Monoliths to observe and enact their plan to encourage hominids to pursue technology and space travel.

As described in Clarke's novel, the Firstborn discovered later how to transfer their consciousness into computers, and thus they became thinking machines. In the end, they surpassed even this achievement, and were able to transfer entirely from physical to noncorporeal forms—the "Lords of the Galaxy"—immortal and capable of travelling at great speeds. The Firstborn had abandoned physical form, but their creations, the Monoliths, remained, and continued to carry out their original assignments.

== Tycho Magnetic Anomalies ==
The term "Tycho Magnetic Anomaly" is something of a misnomer when referring to "TMA-0" and "TMA-2", since neither of these is found on the Moon (let alone in Tycho Crater) and neither one of them emits any significant magnetic field, as described in the novel 2010: Odyssey Two. (The characters in some of the novels do refer to this anomalous nomenclature quizzically.) In the novel, the Russian crewmen of the spaceship Alexei Leonov refer to TMA-2 as "Zagadka" (from the Russian word for "enigma", "mystery", or "riddle").

=== Tycho Magnetic Anomaly-1 ===
The name Tycho Magnetic Anomaly-1 (also known as TMA-1) refers to the strong magnetic field found somewhere in the lunar Crater Tycho by an American scientific satellite. Astronauts find that this magnetic anomaly is caused by an alien Monolith buried about 15 meters below the surface. In the novel, when the Monolith is excavated and examined, it is found to be a black cuboid whose sides extend in the precise ratio of 1 : 4 : 9 (1^{2} : 2^{2} : 3^{2}). Its measurements are given in the novel as 1.25 ft × 5 ft × 11 ft (38 cm × 152 cm × 335 cm), actually a ratio of 1:4:8.8. The monolith is sitting on a platform of the same material above undisturbed rock. Clarke suggests that the sequence or ratio extends past the three known spatial dimensions into much higher dimensions.

TMA-1 was dug up during the lunar night but, after sunrise and its exposure to direct sunlight, TMA-1 emits a single powerful burst of energy, interpreted as radio waves – aimed at Iapetus (a moon of Saturn) in the novel or Jupiter in the motion picture. (The subsequent novels follow the continuity of the film, placing all of the activity around Jupiter.) Its powerful magnetic field disappears immediately. In the novel, some scientists speculate that its magnetic field came from large electric currents, circulating in a system of superconductors for millions of years as an energy-storage mechanism. All of that electric power was expended in the one signal aimed at what would be discovered to be TMA-2.

=== Tycho Magnetic Anomaly-2 ===
An identical object (except in size) was found later, orbiting Jupiter (or on a moon of Saturn in the first novel, although this was changed to Jupiter in the sequel, 2010: Odyssey Two). This object was dubbed "TMA-2", a term that the book calls "doubly inappropriate": it had no magnetic field, and was millions of miles from Tycho. (TMA-2 was often referred to as "Big Brother" due to David Bowman's comments on its larger size.) TMA-2 acted as a Star Gate and transported Dave Bowman across the galaxy in 2001 and brought his consciousness back again in 2010, at which time it duplicated itself over a million times to transform Jupiter into a star. Afterwards, TMA-2 became the home for the digitized minds of Bowman and HAL and supposedly moved to Europa to watch over the evolution of life there. In 2061: Odyssey Three, it is implied that TMA-2 is the monolith found resting on its side on Europa because it has the same size (2 kilometers long) and contains the digitized minds of Dave Bowman and HAL; however, no character refers to it as TMA-2 or Big Brother, instead christening it "The Great Wall". In 3001: The Final Odyssey, the author changes the description of the Europan monolith to be 20 kilometers long, so it is unclear whether TMA-2 changed size or it is actually a different monolith. In any case, HAL and Bowman infect that monolith with a computer virus after it is learned that its superiors are sending an order to destroy humanity. As a result of the virus, TMA-0, TMA-1, and TMA-2/The Great Wall disappear from the Solar System.

=== Tycho Magnetic Anomaly-0 ===
In the year 2513, the first Monolith to be encountered by humankind's prehistoric evolutionary predecessors (the ones featured in the first novel) was found in Olduvai Gorge, buried in ancient rock, and retroactively dubbed "TMA-0".

== Other Monoliths ==
Other than the Monoliths bearing TMA labels, there are many other Monoliths that are seen in the series. In two instances, millions of Monoliths are generated for a limited time. In the first, in 2010: Odyssey Two, millions of Monoliths are generated to transform Jupiter into a star, subsequently named Lucifer. In the second, in 3001: The Final Odyssey, millions of monoliths are generated to block both the Earth and human-settled Ganymede from their primary star in an attempt to destroy the humans. Other specific monoliths are described below.

=== The Great Wall ===
A large Monolith is found resting on its side on Europa in the 2061 novel. It is nicknamed the Great Wall after the Great Wall of China due to its horizontal orientation. It is believed to be watching over the Europans in a manner similar to what TMA-0 did on Earth in the first book. The 2061 novel implies that this Monolith is TMA-2 from the previous novel, but the characters never refer to it as TMA-2 or "Big Brother." It is described as being the same size as TMA-2 and is the home to the digitized minds of Bowman and HAL just as TMA-2 was at the end of the last novel. However, the 3001 novel changes the description of the Great Wall to be 20 kilometers long, so it is unclear whether this monolith is the same as TMA-2 or not. In 2061, Bowman and HAL describe how it was knocked on its side and possibly damaged by the impact of Mount Zeus, a vast diamond shard from Jupiter's core that struck Europa's surface some time following Jupiter's transformation. But in 3001, the monolith on its side is described as having a purpose to protect the evolving Europans. (Arthur C. Clarke admitted to changing some concepts each time he wrote another sequel novel so it is not possible to fully reconcile TMA-2 and The Great Wall.)

=== Minilith ===
A small Monolith appears before Heywood Floyd in 2061 on board the Galaxy spacecraft. He nicknames it "Minilith" for its small size compared to other observed Monoliths. At the end of the book it is explained that Halman used the Minilith to replicate Heywood Floyd's consciousness to help him uncover the Monolith's operations.

=== Superior Monolith ===
In the 3001 novel, it is realized that back in the early 22nd century, TMA-2 broadcast a status report message to a point 450 light years away and is just now receiving instructions in return. Although unseen, this is assumed to be another monolith which is in charge of the monoliths in the Solar System. In other words, TMA-2 was reporting to its Superior.

== Appearance and capabilities ==
The monoliths' dimensions have a ratio of 1 : 4 : 9.

In both films, all the Monoliths are black, extremely flat, non-reflective rectangular solids. In the first novel, the monolith on the African savannah was transparent and "it was not easy to see except when the morning sun glinted on its edges", but became less transparent when active and was described as a crystal.

In the novels and in the films, the dimensions of the monoliths are in the precise ratio of 1 : 4 : 9 (the squares of the first three positive integers). These dimensions are the main source of debate about the simple external design of the Monoliths. It is suggested in the 2001 novel that this number series does not stop at three dimensions.

The Monoliths come in several different sizes: TMA-0 and TMA-1 are both about 11 feet long, TMA-2 is two kilometers long, and the "minilith" is smaller than TMA-1. The Great Wall Monolith is described as being two kilometers long in the 2061 novel but 20 kilometers long in the 3001 novel. Monoliths may be able to assume any size, because in 2010: Odyssey Two, the Star Child, created from the astronaut Dave Bowman, cryptically notes that the Monolith is actually one size – "as large as necessary".

The Monoliths are extremely long-lived and reliable machines, able to survive for millions of years buried in the ground or resisting meteorite impacts and radiation in space with no apparent damage. The two Monoliths recovered and examined by humans are virtually indestructible and impenetrable, resisting all attempts to analyze their composition or internal structure right up to the end of the series. Dr. Heywood Floyd proposes they have some sort of force shield, an impression he gets from touching it; this hypothesis is later accepted as probable because the Monoliths resist destructive testing beyond the theoretical limits of material strength. However, they are not completely indestructible: The Great Wall Monolith (perhaps the same as TMA-2) was knocked on its side and suffered from damage caused by a giant meteorite of solid diamond that collided with Europa in 2061: Odyssey Three. In the final book, 3001: The Final Odyssey, all three Monoliths known to humankind are deactivated by being infected with a powerful computer virus.

While it is unclear what the composition of the Monoliths is, they clearly have mass, which is about the only observation that can be made. In the novel 2010, the crewmen of the spaceship Alexei Leonov measure the mass of TMA-2 and find that it has a density slightly higher than that of air. The masses of TMA-0 and TMA-1 are never revealed by Clarke.

In 2001, TMA-2 opens up a stargate that takes Dave Bowman on a trip across the universe at faster-than-light speeds, and with as much acceleration as the creators of the stargate wish. In 2010 and again in 3001, TMA-2 teleports itself.

TMA-2 replicates itself by a form of symmetrical binary fission and exponential growth to create thousands or millions of identical Monoliths in just a matter of days. In 2010, the many units act to increase the density of Jupiter until stellar ignition is carried out, converting the planet into a miniature star. In 3001, millions of copies of TMA-2 assemble themselves into two megastructure disks that attempt to block the Sun from Earth and Lucifer from its colonies in the Jovian system.

The Monoliths are clearly described in the novels as controlled by an internal computer, like Von Neumann machines. In 2061, the consciousness of Dave Bowman, HAL-9000, and Dr. Floyd become incorporated as computer programs in TMA-2 as their new home. TMA-2 then observes the development of the Europans and guards them from any interplanetary (i.e. human) interference.

Both TMA-1 and TMA-2 produce occasional, powerful, directional radio transmissions. TMA-2 sends a radio transmission towards a star system about 450 light years away in the 22nd century. However, only TMA-1 ever exhibited any strong magnetic fields.

== Actions ==
The TMA-2 Monolith had judged that it would be desirable to nurture the primitive Europans by preventing the eventual freezing of their moon, and to keep humanity separated from them. TMA-2 thus converted Jupiter into a new star (dubbed "Lucifer", meaning "light-bringer") to warm Europa into more habitable conditions – at the cost of exterminating the Jovians, ocean-like creatures who swam through the upper atmosphere of Jupiter. The Jovians were judged too primitive, as due to their environment they had no hope of ever developing to become an advanced civilization.

TMA-2 also apparently decided, in the early 21st century, that humanity was a failed species and that it was possibly necessary to destroy them. Apparently the TMA-2 Monolith was allowed to destroy primitive species at its own discretion, but needed the authorisation of a "superior" to destroy an advanced spaceflight-capable civilisation such as humanity. This "superior" was a Monolith located in a distant star system, but even the Monoliths were limited by the speed of light in their interstellar communications. Thus it took 450 years for the message sent by TMA-2 to reach its "superior", which then sent a message giving permission to destroy humanity, which took another 450 years to return to the Sol system in the year 3001. Due to the efforts of Frank Poole and the Europa team on Earth, the ascended Dave Bowman and AI HAL (now fused as one being "Halman" in the Monolith's computational matrix) were able to introduce a subtle computer virus into TMA-2 which destroyed it before it could render the human race extinct.

The Firstborn did not appear to have abandoned all interest in the evolutionary experiments overseen by the ancient Monoliths. The Monoliths' communications are said to be limited by the speed of light, but Dave Bowman is sent on an interstellar journey at the end of 2001: A Space Odyssey, and Bowman is apparently transformed into the Star Child, not by the Monoliths, but by the Firstborn (both Kubrick and Clarke have similarly stated that Bowman was transformed by non-corporeal aliens, not the Monoliths). They also subsequently transform HAL in 2010, to give Bowman a companion. The epilogue to 3001: The Final Odyssey reveals that the Firstborn had been monitoring humanity's final confrontation with the Monoliths in the Sol system, but chose not to intervene, likely considering it a test of mankind's abilities - either they would find a way to stop the Monoliths and thus prove their worth, or fail and prove the Monoliths' point. Unlike the TMA-2 Monolith, whose judgment of humanity was based on its social progress by the year 2001, the Firstborn considered the more peaceful and responsible humanity of the year 3001 worthy of survival, or at least not a threat to the Europans. Their assessment seems to prove true, as subsequently Frank Poole and the other humans land on Europa and attempt to start peaceful relations with the primitive native Europs.

== Europa ==
When TMA-2 transformed Jupiter into the new star "Lucifer", it warmed Europa to nearly the average temperature of Earth, melting the ice sheets which once covered the moon - and giving an evolutionary boost to indigenous life-forms which had existed in the oceans hidden beneath. This is directly compared to how the original TMA-0 gave pre-human apes an evolutionary nudge on the path towards sapience. The near-sapient life-forms on Europa are dubbed "Europs" by humans.

Due to the branching storylines of each book, the third novel ends with a flash-forward 20,000 years into the future, with the Europs developing a basic civilization without outside contact from humanity. The fourth and final novel, 3001, altered this to end with the revived Frank Poole making first contact with the Europs and attempting to begin peaceful relations.

Physically, Europs are described as looking like "a small, leafless bush, with no obvious sense organs or means of communication". They walk on half a dozen slender trunks, which divide into hundreds of twigs, which divide again - making them very dexterous, and potential tool-users. Prior to the Monoliths' interference, they evolved as filter-feeders on the frozen seas under the moon's ice, using their twig-arms to strain for plankton. They were hunted by predators, one notable species of which is described as "like a flying carpet, but as big as a football field", dredging the ocean floor. In response, the Europs gradually evolved to build basic shelters for themselves on the ocean floor - comparable to Earth cephalopods using shells as "tools" in the form of protection. The Monolith's warming of the moon spurred the Europs to become amphibious, migrating on land where they construct basic ice-igloos, as an advance over their underwater hovels. The Europs still need to return to water to feed, but now have total protection from aquatic predators while they sleep in their land-based shelters.

Because life in Europa's oceans evolved around thermal vents that received no sunlight, the Europs' biochemistry is based on sulfur respiration. This is much less energy efficient than the Terran biosphere's oxygen-based respiration, resulting in the Europs being very slow: it's remarked that "even a sloth could outrun a Europ". This limit on energy efficiency also results in Europs being much smaller than humans. Overall, without the protection of the Monoliths, the Europs could have easily been wiped out by humanity with little effort.

One area of pre-sapient activity observed among the Europs by 3001 is that they are fascinated by metal artefacts from crashed human spaceships and probes - as they have no counterpart in their raw state under the oceans. Whenever the Europs find abandoned human machinery (or the crashed ship Tsien) they strip all the metal from them, and pile it in heaps, frequently rearranging the pieces. Frank Poole speculatively compares this to the "Cargo cult" phenomenon on Earth in the twentieth century, and cites it as a spark of curiosity that shows an advance from pure animal instinct. At the end of the final novel, when Frank Poole approaches the Europs for first contact, he carries a large, shiny copper wire as a peace offering to them.

== Design ==
The first design for the Monolith for the 2001 film was a tetrahedral pyramid. This was taken from the 1951 short story "The Sentinel" that the first story was based on. A London firm was approached to provide a 12-foot (3.7 m) plexiglass pyramid, and due to construction constraints they recommended a flat slab shape. Kubrick approved, but was disappointed with the glassy appearance of the prop on set, leading art director Anthony Masters to suggest making the monolith black. The rejected acrylic monolith can be seen in St Katharine Docks, London, where it was hung in 1977 to commemorate the Queen's silver jubilee.

== Replicas ==
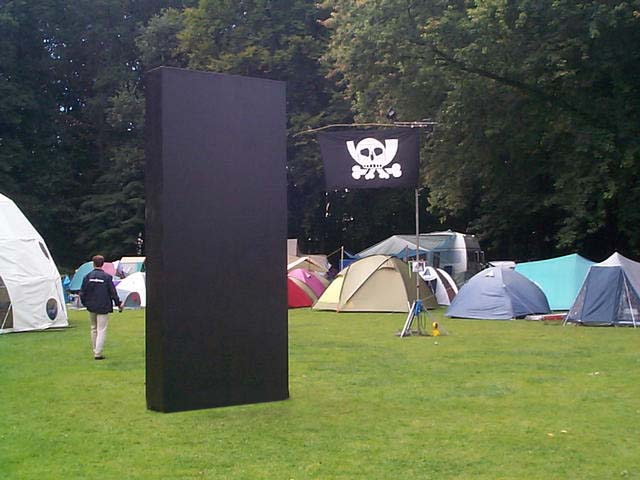
Monolith replica at HAL (2001)

Replicas have been displayed in some places as a tribute to the movie:

- A black bronze monolith of roughly the same size as the original (about 5m tall) was erected in 1973 on the campus of the University of Hawaii at Mānoa and has been standing ever since.
- During the Dutch Hackers at Large conference in 2001, a replica monolith was erected.
- In Kerbal Space Program, players can find several monoliths scattered around the in-game planetary system.
- Similar looking monoliths on the moon and Mars in the game Space Engineers.
- In 2016, a replica appeared at the NASA Ames Research Center.

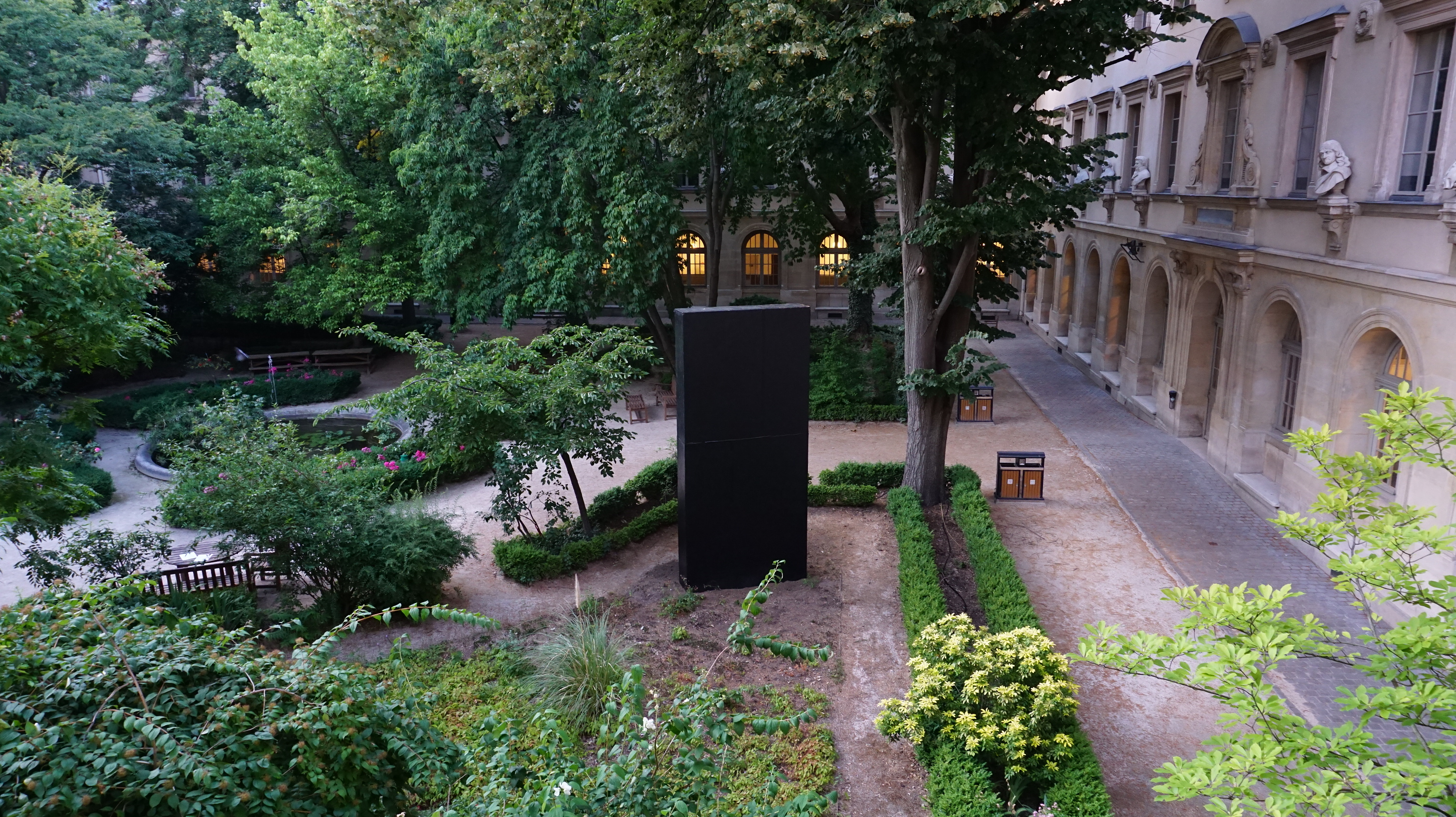
Monolith replica at ENS in 2020

- In June 2020, a 4.5 meters (15 ft) tall wooden replica was found in the main courtyard of the École normale supérieure (ENS) University in Paris.
- In October 2023, an ultra black (low reflectivity) 1:4:9
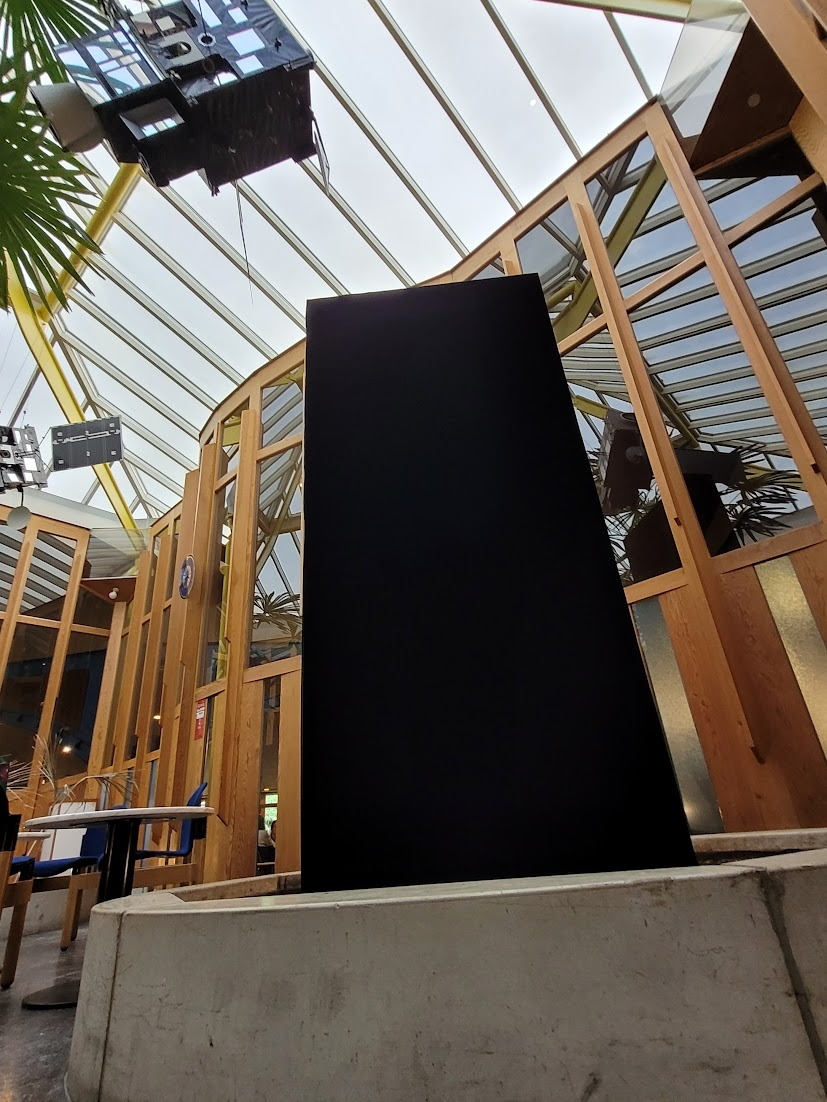
  ESA/ESTEC monolith replica
  monolith replica appeared during the European Space Research and Technology Centre open day in the squash court. It has since been installed in the Winter garden at ESTEC.
- In the 2014 film Interstellar, directed by Christopher Nolan, two robots named TARS and CASE accompany four NASA astronauts on their journey in the search of a new home for humanity. The robots have a striking resemblance to the monoliths.
- In Spore, players can use monoliths to increase the intelligence of creatures on other planets, allowing them to progress into the Space stage.

== See also ==
- Seattle Monolith – Artwork installed in Seattle on New Year's Day 2001
- Utah monolith – Metal pillar in Utah, US
