= 3001: The Final Odyssey =

1997 science fiction novel by British writer Arthur C. Clarke

- First edition
- Author: Arthur C. Clarke
- Cover artist: Chris Moore
- Language: English
- Genre: Science fiction
- Publisher: Voyager Books (UK); Del Rey Books (US)
- Publication date: 1997
- Publication place: United Kingdom
- Pages: 272 (first edition)
- ISBN: 0-345-31522-7 (US hardback edition)
- OCLC: 35919386
- Dewey Decimal: 823/.914 21
- LC Class: PR6005.L36 A618 1997
- Preceded by: 2061: Odyssey Three

3001: The Final Odyssey is a 1997 science fiction novel by British writer Arthur C. Clarke. It is the fourth and final book in Clarke's Space Odyssey series.

== Plot summary ==
The novel begins with a brief prologue describing the bioforms—dubbed the First-Born—who created the black monoliths. They evolved from "primordial soup", and over the course of millions of years became a space-faring species. Perceiving that nothing was more precious than the mind, they catalysed the evolution of intelligent species wherever they went, by increasing the intelligent species' chance of survival. After visiting Earth, the First-Born found a way to impress themselves into the fabric of space and time, becoming effectively immortal. Meanwhile, the monoliths—implied to have been forgotten by their creators when they ascended to a higher state of being—continued to watch over their subjects.

3001 follows the adventures of Frank Poole, the astronaut killed by the HAL 9000 computer in 2001: A Space Odyssey. One millennium later, Poole's freeze-dried body is discovered floating in the Kuiper belt by a comet-collecting space tug named the Goliath, and revived. The resurrected Poole is taken home to learn about the Earth in the year 3001. Some of its notable features include the BrainCap, a brain–computer interface technology; genetically engineered dinosaur servants; and four gigantic space elevators located evenly around the Equator. Humans have also colonised the Jovian moons Ganymede and Callisto. TMA-1, the black monolith found on the Moon in 1999, had been brought to Earth in 2006 and installed in front of the United Nations Building in New York City.

Poole integrates into the society of 3001, but is prompted by a friend to revisit Europa, a cradle of nascent life from which the monolith had banned humanity almost a millennium earlier. It is believed he might be the first person allowed to visit there. On Europa he is greeted by the voice of David Bowman and computer HAL 9000, who have now become a single entity—Halman—residing as digitized lifeforms in the monolith's computational matrix. In subsequent conversations he learns that the monoliths themselves are mechanisms, answerable to an unknown superior monolith, or perhaps lifeforms, almost 450 light-years away.

Thirty years later, Poole is married, and a member of a small team responsible for monitoring Europa. Halman contacts him to warn that following the events of 2010: Odyssey Two and 2061: Odyssey Three, the Jovian monolith had sent a report to its superior monolith, containing details about the human species after first contact. Since this report took place shortly after the wars of the 20th century, Halman believes the response just received after the 900-year round trip contains instructions to destroy humanity, due to its perceived failure as a species.

Unsure whether they can physically harm the Monolith, the Europa team decide instead to infect it—as a computational mechanism—with a computer virus. Poole requests Halman to act as a Trojan Horse and place the virus inside the monolith, where it will be executed. Suitable computer and biological viruses already exist in the Pico Vault, an ultrasecure storage on the Moon, used for the most dangerous agents of these kinds. The Europa team also agree to leave a petabyte-capacity holographic 3D storage medium on Europa to allow Halman and other lifeforms in the monolith to upload themselves and escape the monolith's failure.

The monolith does receive orders to exterminate humanity, and starts a duplication, whereupon millions of monoliths form two cascade screens to prevent Solar light and heat from reaching Earth and its colonies, but the monoliths all quickly disintegrate as a result of the virus. The monoliths' makers' response to its destruction will occur in another 900 years as the earliest possibility.

The petabyte storage device, containing Halman and other lifeforms, but also infected with the virus, is subsequently sealed by scientists in the Pico Vault. At the close of the story, Poole and other humans land on Europa to start peaceful relations with the primitive native Europans. A statement is made that the monolith's makers will not determine humanity's fate until "the Last Days".

A chronological continuation can be considered the short epilogue of the second book, 2010: Odyssey Two (1982), in which the action takes place 17,000 years later, in 20,001 CE (see more details).

== Characters ==
=== Main characters ===
- Frank Poole: 3001's protagonist, Frank Poole has been revived by highly advanced medicine, a thousand years after being killed by HAL during the Discovery's original mission.
- Dr. Indra Wallace: A specialist on the history of the early twenty-first century, Wallace acts as Poole's cultural guide.
- Halman: a merging of the entities that were once HAL 9000 and Dave Bowman, Halman communicates with Poole at various points throughout the novel, warning Poole of the possibility that the monoliths may issue negative judgment against humanity.

=== Minor characters ===
- Dimitri Chandler: Captain of the Goliath, Chandler mines the outer solar system for ice material which is slowly pushed towards the inner solar system, to make the inner planets habitable through long-term terraforming.
- Professor Anderson: a medical doctor, Anderson leads the medical team which revived Poole, and works with Indra Wallace both to aid Poole's convalescence, and also to manage his cultural shock at awakening into a strange future world.
- Dr. Stephen Del Marco: Alive at a future time (2513 AD) which is yet in the novel's distant past, Del Marco is the discoverer of TMA-0 in Africa: an earthbound monolith matching the lunar monolith which had been discovered hundreds of years earlier, in 2001.
- Dr. Theodore "Ted" Khan: A resident of Ganymede, Dr. Khan is contemptuous of religion, identifying it as a mental disorder.

== Adaptations ==
In 2000, Yahoo! reported that MGM and actor/director Tom Hanks were in discussions regarding adapting both 2061: Odyssey Three and 3001: The Final Odyssey into movies, with Hanks reportedly to play Frank Poole in the 3001 film. An update in 2001 stated that there was no further development on the project.

On 3 November 2014, it was reported that the US TV channel Syfy had ordered a miniseries adaptation of 3001: The Final Odyssey into production, planned for broadcast in 2015. The miniseries would be executive-produced by Ridley Scott, David W. Zucker and Stuart Beattie; the latter would also be the primary script-writer. The estates of both Clarke and 2001: A Space Odyssey director Stanley Kubrick were reported as having "offered their full support", but the extent of their involvement was not known at the time. In February 2016, within Syfy's press release for its television pilot Prototype, other series including the Final Odyssey series were mentioned as being in development. However, to date, no further progress has been made.

The plot of Futurama has similarities, with the character of Fry being frozen for 1000 years (albeit in 1999) and waking in the year 3000.
