= 2010: Odyssey Two =

1982 science fiction novel by Arthur C. Clarke

- First Edition cover – 1982
- Author: Arthur C. Clarke
- Cover artist: Michael Whelan
- Series: Space Odyssey
- Genre: Science fiction
- Publisher: Ballantine Books
- Publication date: December 1982
- Publication place: United States
- Media type: Print (hardcover, paperback)
- Pages: 291 (first edition, hardback)
- ISBN: 0-345-30305-9 (first edition, hardback)
- Preceded by: 2001: A Space Odyssey
- Followed by: 2061: Odyssey Three

2010: Odyssey Two is a 1982 science fiction novel by British writer Arthur C. Clarke. It is the sequel to his 1968 novel 2001: A Space Odyssey, though Clarke changed some elements of the story to align with the film version of 2001.

Set in the year 2010, nine years after the failure of the Discovery One mission to Jupiter, (Note: In the novel version of 2001, the Discovery journeyed to Saturn, not Jupiter; Clarke acknowledges this retroactive continuity in his author's foreword.) the plot centres on a joint Soviet-US mission aboard the Soviet spacecraft Alexei Leonov. The mission has several objectives, including salvaging the spaceship Discovery and investigating the mysterious monolith discovered by Dave Bowman in 2001: A Space Odyssey. It was nominated for the Hugo Award for Best Novel in 1983. The novel was adapted for the screen by Peter Hyams and released as the film 2010: The Year We Make Contact in 1984.

== Plot ==
A joint Soviet-American crew, including Heywood Floyd, on the Soviet spacecraft Alexei Leonov (named after the cosmonaut) arrives to discover what went wrong with the earlier mission, to investigate the monolith in orbit around Jupiter, and to resolve the disappearance of David Bowman. They hypothesize that much of this information is locked away on the now-abandoned Discovery One. The Soviets have an advanced new "Sakharov" drive which will propel them to Jupiter ahead of the American Discovery Two, so Floyd is assigned to the Leonov crew.

However, a Chinese space station rockets out of Earth orbit, revealing itself to be the interplanetary spacecraft Tsien, also aimed at Jupiter. The Leonov crewmembers think the Chinese are on a one-way trip due to its speed, but Floyd surmises that due to the large water content of Europa they intend to land there and use the water content to refuel. The Tsien's daring mission ends in failure, when it is destroyed by an indigenous lifeform on Europa. The only survivor, Professor Chang, radios the story to the Leonov, confirming that life exists on the moon; it is presumed that he dies when his spacesuit air supply runs out.

The Leonov survives a dangerous aerobraking around Jupiter and arrives at Discovery (One). Mission crewmember and HAL 9000's creator, Dr. Chandra, reactivates the computer to ascertain the cause of its earlier aberrant behavior. After some time, Floyd is speaking to Vasili Orlov on board, and Orlov, for an instant, sees the Monolith, dubbed "Big Brother", open into a Stargate again as David Bowman escapes from the Monolith's dimension back into ours. Unfortunately, Dr. Floyd is facing the wrong direction and therefore does not see this.

A sequence of scenes follows the explorations of David Bowman, who has been transformed into a non-corporeal, energy-based lifeform, much like the aliens controlling the monoliths. During his journey, the avatar of Bowman appears on Earth, making contact with significant individuals from his past: He visits his mother and brushes her hair shortly before she dies, and he appears to his ex-girlfriend on her television screen. The aliens are using Bowman as a probe to learn about humankind. He then returns to the Jupiter system to explore beneath the ice of Europa, where he finds aquatic lifeforms, and under the clouds of Jupiter, where he discovers gaseous life-forms. Both are primitive, but the aliens deem the Europan creatures to have evolutionary potential.

An apparition of Bowman appears before Floyd, warning him that they must leave Jupiter within fifteen days. Floyd has difficulty convincing the rest of the crew at first, but then the monolith vanishes from orbit.

The Leonov crew devises a plan to use the Discovery (One) as a "booster rocket", enabling them to return to Earth ahead of schedule. HAL and the Discovery (One) will be trapped in Jupiter's orbit, with insufficient fuel to escape. The crew are worried that HAL will have the same neurosis on discovering that he will be abandoned yet again, so Chandra must convince HAL that the human crew is in danger.

The Leonov crew flees Jupiter as a mysterious dark spot appears on Jupiter and begins to grow. HAL's telescope observations reveal that the "Great Black Spot" is, in fact, a vast population of monoliths, increasing at an exponential rate, which appear to be eating the planet. By acting as von Neumann machines, these monoliths increase Jupiter's density until the planet achieves nuclear fusion, becoming a small star. This obliterates the primitive life forms inhabiting the Jovian atmosphere, which the Monoliths' controllers had deemed highly unlikely to ever achieve intelligence, unlike the aquatic life of Europa.

As Jupiter is about to transform, Bowman returns to Discovery (One) to give HAL a last order to carry out. HAL begins repeatedly broadcasting the message

ALL THESE WORLDS ARE YOURS – EXCEPT EUROPA.
ATTEMPT NO LANDING THERE.

The creation of the new star, which Earth eventually names Lucifer, destroys Discovery (One). However, in appreciation for HAL's help, Bowman has the aliens that control the monoliths remove HAL's artificial intelligence from Discovery's computer core and transform him into the same kind of entity as David Bowman, and become his companion.

=== Epilogue ===
The book ends with a brief epilogue:

The year is 20,001 CE, 17,000 years after the events of the final novel, 3001: The Final Odyssey (1997). By this time, the Europans have evolved into a species that has developed a primitive civilization, most likely with assistance from a Monolith. They are not described in detail, though they are said to have "tendril"-like limbs. They regard the star Lucifer (formerly the planet Jupiter) as their primary sun, referring to Sol as "The Cold Sun". Though their settlements are concentrated primarily in the hemisphere of Europa which is constantly bathed in Lucifer's rays, some Europans have begun in recent generations to explore the Farside, the hemisphere facing away from Lucifer, which is still covered in ice. There they may witness the spectacle of night, unknown on the other side of Europa, when the Cold Sun sets.

The Europans who explore the Farside have been carefully observing the night sky and have begun to develop a mythology based on their observations. They correctly believe that Lucifer was not always there. They believe that the Cold Sun was its brother and was condemned to march around the sky for a crime. The Europans also see three other major bodies in the sky. One seems to be constantly engulfed in fire, and the other two have lights on them which are gradually spreading. These three bodies are the moons Io, Callisto, and Ganymede, the latter two of which are presently being colonised by humans.

Humans have been attempting to explore Europa ever since Lucifer was created in 2010. However, none of these attempts have been successful. Every probe that has attempted to land on Europa has been destroyed on approach. The debris from every probe falls to the surface of the planet, and the debris from some of the first ships to be destroyed is venerated by the Europans.

Finally, there is a Monolith on Europa, which is worshipped by the Europans more than anything else. The Europans assume, correctly, that the Monolith is what keeps humans at bay. Dave Bowman and HAL lie dormant in this Monolith. The Monolith is the guardian of Europa, and will continue to prevent contact between humans and Europans for as long as it sees fit.

== Characters ==
=== Main characters ===
In the novel, the Leonov is staffed by three Americans, and seven Soviets. HAL also re-appears as a major character.

- Dr. Heywood Floyd: The protagonist, Floyd must embark on an odyssey to Jupiter with American colleagues aboard a Soviet ship, the Leonov, to revive Discovery. The character was played by Roy Scheider in the 1984 film, replacing William Sylvester who portrayed the same character in 1968's 2001: A Space Odyssey.
- Dr. Walter Curnow: gregarious American engineer and expert on Discovery's systems.
- Dr. Sivasubramanian Chandrasegarampillai, or "Dr. Chandra": HAL's inventor. Quiet and reserved, Dr. Chandra, who is Indian, is the third member of the American team, charged with re-activating HAL. For the 1984 film, the character was changed to a white American played by Bob Balaban.
- Captain Tatiana "Tanya" Orlova: Soviet captain of the Leonov. The character's last name in the film was changed to Kirbuk and was played by British actress Helen Mirren.
- Dr. Vasili Orlov: the Leonov's chief scientist, and husband of Orlova.
- Dr. Maxim (Max) Brailovsky: Spacewalker and Curnow's Soviet counterpart. He and Curnow are both bisexual and enjoy a romantic relationship during the mission, though Max eventually becomes engaged to Zenia Marchenko.
- Surgeon Commander Katerina Rudenko: The Leonov's matronly medical doctor. In the film, this character is recast as a man.
- Dr. Alexander "Sasha" Kovalev: Communications officer of the Leonov, Sasha states basic science information at certain points.
- Dr. Nikolai Ternovsky: The computational expert for the Leonov crew, Ternovsky works with Dr. Chandra to reactivate HAL upon the Discovery rendezvous.
- Zenia Marchenko: an understudy for Dr. Irina Yakunina, ship's nutritionist. In the book, Marchenko shelters with Floyd while the Leonov executes a dangerous and dramatic maneuver. The film's equivalent character, who likewise shelters with Floyd, is there named as Irina Yakunina, the same namesake as the book's replaced character, who in the book does not actually join the Leonov's voyage, due to a hang gliding accident.
- HAL 9000: the Discovery's on board ship's computer, HAL is held suspect by most other characters for having caused the deaths of the Discovery's crew except Bowman, despite the explanation that HAL was given conflicting orders regarding secrecy and deception, which HAL is manifestly not designed to carry out.

=== Minor characters ===
- The Floyd family: Floyd is described as having had two families. Floyd's deceased first wife, Marion, is said to have borne him two daughters. At the time of the novel's events, Floyd is living with his second wife, Caroline, and their son Christopher, a toddler. A male dolphin named Scarback, together with its mate, routinely visit the Floyd household, and communicates with Christopher in a language dubbed Dolphin.
- The Bowman family: In a series of flashbacks and literal movements through space and time, the newly-ascended character of David Bowman remembers, interacts with, and makes some peace with his old human life. Bowman remembers his brother Robert "Bobby" Bowman, who died while the two used an improvised scuba device to explore an underwater cave as children, and Bowman visits his elderly mother Jessie Bowman in her hospital room at the moment of her death. Later, Bowman also visits his ex-girlfriend Betty Fernandez (née Schultz). In youth, Betty had originally been Robert's girlfriend, and after Robert's death, Betty took up with Bowman. Following Bowman's disappearance and presumptive death, Betty married Jose Fernandez, and bore him a son, Carlos. In their final interaction, Betty lies to Bowman that Carlos is his son.
- Professor Chang: One of five Chinese Tsien crew members (alongside one Dr. Lee, mentioned in passing), Chang relays a poignant farewell message to the Leonov from the surface of Europa, addressed especially to Floyd. In it, Chang reports the destruction of the Tsien, his own imminent death, and the existence of life on Europa. The novel's early Tsien story arc, continued in 2061, in which Chinese astronauts compete with Americans and Soviets to be the first to rendezvous with Discovery, is completely absent from the film.
- Dr. Dimitri Moisevitch: Floyd's Soviet friend and counterpart from the 2001 novel returns to correspond during the novel and give worldly "spy-ripostes" from one bureaucrat to another. In the novel's opening scene, Moisevitch and Floyd present the exposition of the joint Soviet–American mission, against the backdrop of the Arecibo telescope; the film approximates this opening scene, instead using the Very Large Array as its setting.
- Victor Millson: Floyd's bureaucratic successor, rival and contact for official Earth/American business.
- SAL 9000: HAL's earthbound counterpart. An early scene shows Dr. Chandra discussing HAL with SAL, which is faithfully reproduced in the film. In the film, actress Candice Bergen provided the voice of SAL, which was credited to her as "Olga Mallsnerd".

== Writing ==
2010 is Clarke's first book written on a computer. He wrote the first 25% of the novel on an electric typewriter, but started using an Archives III computer (made in Davenport, Iowa) in late 1981 (which he lovingly christened "Archie"). Impressed by its word processing features, he wrote the rest of the novel using this method.

=== Relations to reality ===
Clarke used for the novel names of various Soviet dissidents, including physicists Andrei Sakharov and Yuri Orlov, human-rights activists Mykola Rudenko and Anatoly Marchenko, Russian Orthodox activist Gleb Yakunin. Clarke himself makes a reference to "getting (editor Vasili Zakharchenko) into deep trouble by borrowing the names of various dissidents" in 2061: Odyssey Three.

=== Discontinuities between 2010 and the other works ===
Clarke acknowledged such inconsistencies in the Author's Note to 2061:

Just as 2010: Odyssey Two was not a direct sequel to 2001: A Space Odyssey, so this book is not a linear sequel to 2010. They must all be considered as variations on the same theme, involving many of the same characters and situations, but not necessarily happening in the same universe. Developments since 1964 make total consistency impossible, as the later stories incorporate discoveries and events that had not even taken place when the earlier books were written.

- The second half of the novel 2001: A Space Odyssey takes place around Saturn, with the Monolith embedded in the surface of the Saturnian moon Iapetus. The novel 2010 follows the continuity of the film 2001, which places the Monolith and Discovery in orbit between Jupiter and the Jovian moon Io.
- When Dave Bowman recalls the events of 2001 in the 2010 novel, he remembers the incident of chasing after Frank Poole's corpse in a pod without his helmet, and then entering the Discovery through the emergency airlock. However, this incident only occurred in the 2001 film. In the 2001 novel, Bowman remains in the ship and HAL attempts to kill him by opening all of the pod bay doors to evacuate all air from within the ship.
- In the novel 2001, Dave Bowman says "Oh my God—it's full of stars!" during his encounter with the monolith. In the novel 2010, characters quote Bowman slightly differently as saying "My God—it's full of stars!" in his last transmission. In the film version of 2001, Dave Bowman is not shown speaking any words as he leaves Discovery and approaches the monolith. However, the film version of 2010 includes a recording of Bowman saying "My God—it's full of stars!" as if it had occurred in the 2001 film.
- The 2001 novel describes Dave Bowman's transformation into the Star-Child and his return to Earth. The 2010 novel repeats this part of the story, abbreviating it in some ways, expanding it in others, and occasionally changing some details. For example, despite the scenes in the 2001 film, there is no mention in the 2001 novel of Bowman growing old before regressing to a child. However, the 2010 novel aligns with the film by restating that Bowman dreamt that he grew old when the entity entered his mind (despite the 2001 novel stating he did not dream). As another example, the 2001 novel says the Star-Child chooses not to use the Star Gate to return to the Solar System, but the 2010 novel restates that he does use the Star Gate (which allows the Leonov to witness his arrival).
- In all of the Space Odyssey novels and the film version of 2010, HAL's instructor is named Dr. Chandra; in the film 2001: A Space Odyssey, it is Mr. Langley.
- The events of 3001: The Final Odyssey, the fourth and final novel in the Space Odyssey series, make the epilogue of this novel impossible, or at least unlikely. In 3001 the monoliths become infected with a series of computer viruses (through software emulation) and disappear from the Solar System. It is feasible, though, that the monolith network is able to purge itself of the viruses and return to Sol and Lucifer prior to the year 20,001, and avoid another human-sourced infection.
- The film version of 2010 is a largely faithful adaptation of the 2010 novel. The major differences are that the film eliminates the Chinese spacecraft from the plot, places the United States and the Soviet Union at the brink of war, has a crewmember killed by the monolith when he approaches it in a pod, and expands Bowman's final message protecting Europa to include a directive to work together in peace.

== Reception ==
Dave Langford reviewed 2010: Odyssey Two for White Dwarf #39, and stated that "Since the strength of 2001's mystical ending came from the teasing unanswerability of the question 'what happens next?' it's anticlimactic when Clarke now tells us what happens next. And though interesting things happen, smoothly described, there's a certain familiarity when the book halts on the brink of another and less interesting question."

== Sources ==
- Clarke, Arthur C. (1997) [1982]. 2010: Odyssey Two. US: Del Rey; 1st Ballantine Books trade pbk. ed edition. ISBN 0-345-41397-0.
- Clarke, Arthur C. (1983). 2010: Odyssey Two. UK: Granada Publishing Ltd. ISBN 0-246-11912-8.
- Clarke, Arthur C. (1982). 2010: Odyssey Two. US: Ballantine Books; First Edition. ISBN 0-345-30305-9.
