= 2010: The Year We Make Contact =

1984 film by Peter Hyams

- Theatrical release poster
- Directed by: Peter Hyams
- Screenplay by: Peter Hyams
- Based on: 2010: Odyssey Two by Arthur C. Clarke
- Produced by: Peter Hyams
- Starring: Roy Scheider; John Lithgow; Helen Mirren; Bob Balaban; Keir Dullea; Douglas Rain
- Cinematography: Peter Hyams
- Edited by: James Mitchell; Mia Goldman
- Music by: David Shire
- Production company: Metro-Goldwyn-Mayer
- Distributed by: MGM/UA Entertainment Co.
- Release date: December 7, 1984
- Running time: 116 minutes
- Country: United States
- Language: English
- Budget: US$28 million
- Box office: US$40.4 million (North America)

2010: The Year We Make Contact (or simply 2010) is a 1984 American science fiction film written, produced, shot, and directed by Peter Hyams. The film is a sequel to Stanley Kubrick's 1968 film 2001: A Space Odyssey and adapts Arthur C. Clarke's 1982 novel 2010: Odyssey Two. 2010 follows a joint American and Soviet crew that is sent to Jupiter to discover the reason behind the failure of the Discovery One mission. The film stars Roy Scheider, Helen Mirren, Bob Balaban, and John Lithgow, along with Keir Dullea and Douglas Rain, who reprise their roles from the previous film.

The film was released in the United States on December 7, 1984. 2010: The Year We Make Contact received mixed reviews from critics, who praised the special effects, but considered the film inferior to its predecessor. It earned $40.4 million at the domestic box office against a budget of $28 million.

== Plot ==
Nine years have passed since the failure of the Discovery mission to Jupiter in 2001, (Note: As depicted in 2001: A Space Odyssey (1968)) in which commander David Bowman and his crew were lost. Amid international tensions, the United States and Soviet Union each prepare separate missions to Jupiter. The Soviet spacecraft Leonov will be ready a year before the American Discovery Two, but only the Americans can reactivate the ship's sentient computer, HAL 9000, thought to be responsible for the disaster. Since Discovery will crash into Jupiter's moon Io before the Americans can reach it, the Soviets agree to bring along former NCA (Note: The "National Council on Astronautics" is the equivalent of NASA in both 2001 and 2010.) Director Heywood Floyd, Discovery engineer Walter Curnow, and HAL 9000 creator Dr. Chandra.

Arriving at Jupiter, Leonov detects chlorophyll on Jupiter's icy moon Europa. A probe sent to investigate is destroyed by an energy burst upon reaching the source of the chlorophyll. Floyd suggests that this is a warning to stay away from Europa.

After aerobraking in Jupiter's atmosphere, Leonov enters orbit around Io and encounters Discovery. Curnow and Cosmonaut Max Brailovsky spacewalk to and enter the derelict vessel. Both men suffer panic attacks for different reasons, bonding over the shared experience and becoming friends.

Curnow restores Discovery's power and propulsion, and Chandra reactivates HAL. The ships move to investigate the giant monolith located at the Lagrange point between Jupiter and Io. Brailovsky approaches it in an EVA pod, but is killed when the pod is destroyed by an energy burst.

On Earth, Bowman, now a noncorporeal being, appears through his former wife's television to say goodbye, telling her that "something wonderful" is going to happen. He then visits his comatose mother in a hospital, and she awakens, seemingly aware of her son's presence. The unseen Bowman brushes her hair, and after he departs, she dies peacefully.

Chandra discovers the reasons for HAL's malfunction: the National Security Council ordered HAL to conceal information about the monolith from Discovery's crew. This conflicted with HAL's basic programming, causing the computer equivalent of a paranoid breakdown. When Bowman and co-pilot Frank Poole discussed deactivating the malfunctioning computer, HAL concluded that the human crew was endangering the mission, and terminated them. Chandra blames Floyd, who denies any knowledge of the order, although it bears his signature.

A political crisis on Earth brings the United States and the Soviet Union to the brink of war. The Americans are thus ordered to leave Leonov for Discovery. Both ships plan to depart Jupiter in the coming weeks, but Bowman appears to Floyd to warn him that everyone must leave within two days.

Floyd returns to Leonov to convince Soviet captain Tanya Kirbuk to leave early. Neither ship has the fuel to reach Earth if they depart ahead of schedule, but Floyd proposes using Discovery as a booster rocket, then leaving it behind while both crews escape on Leonov. As they argue, the monolith suddenly disappears. Alarmed, Kirbuk agrees to Floyd's plan.

An ominous black spot appears in Jupiter's atmosphere. HAL determines that the spot is a vast group of monoliths, multiplying exponentially and altering Jupiter's mass and chemical composition. He recommends halting the countdown to study the phenomenon. Floyd worries HAL will prioritize his mission over the safety of the human crews, but Chandra reveals to HAL the crew is in danger and that both ships could be destroyed. HAL thanks Chandra for telling him the truth, and proceeds with the escape plan. Once Discovery's fuel is exhausted, Leonov separates and fires its own engines.

Bowman asks HAL to transmit a message to Earth. The monoliths engulf Jupiter, causing it to undergo nuclear fusion, and become a star. Before Discovery is destroyed, HAL sends this message:

ALL THESE WORLDS
ARE YOURS EXCEPT
EUROPA
ATTEMPT NO
LANDING THERE
USE THEM TOGETHER
USE THEM IN PEACE

Leonov survives the shockwave from Jupiter's ignition, and returns home. Floyd narrates how the new star's miraculous appearance, and the message from a mysterious alien power, inspire the American and Soviet leaders to seek peace. Under its infant sun, icy Europa transforms into a humid jungle, covered with life, and watched over by a monolith.

== Cast ==
- Roy Scheider as Heywood Floyd
- John Lithgow as Walter Curnow
- Helen Mirren as Tanya Kirbuk
- Bob Balaban as R. Chandra
- Keir Dullea as Dave Bowman
- Douglas Rain as the voice of HAL 9000
- Madolyn Smith as Caroline Floyd
- Dana Elcar as Dimitri Moisevitch
- Taliesin Jaffe as Christopher Floyd
- James McEachin as Victor Milson
- Natasha Shneider as Irina Yakunina
- Vladimir Skomarovsky as Yuri Svetlanov
- Mary Jo Deschanel as Betty Fernandez, Bowman's widow
- Elya Baskin as Maxim Brailovsky
- Savely Kramarov as Vladimir Rudenko
- Oleg Rudnik as Vasili Orlov

In addition, background crew members on the Leonov are played by Victor Steinbach and Jan Triska, while Herta Ware briefly appears as Bowman's mother. Candice Bergen, credited as "Olga Mallsnerd", voices the SAL 9000.

Arthur C. Clarke, author of the novels for 2001 and 2010, appears as a man on a park bench feeding pigeons outside the White House (visible in the letterboxed and widescreen versions). In addition, a Time cover about the American–Soviet tension is briefly shown, in which the President of the United States is portrayed by Clarke and the Soviet Premier by 2001's writer, producer, and director, Stanley Kubrick.

== Production ==
=== Development and filming ===
When Clarke published his novel 2010: Odyssey Two in 1982, he telephoned Stanley Kubrick, and jokingly said, "Your job is to stop anybody [from] making it [into a film] so I won't be bothered." Metro-Goldwyn-Mayer subsequently worked out a contract to make a film adaptation, but Kubrick had no interest in directing it. However, Peter Hyams was interested and contacted both Clarke and Kubrick for their blessings:

I had a long conversation with Stanley and told him what was going on. If it met with his approval, I would do the film; and if it didn't, I wouldn't. I certainly would not have thought of doing the film if I had not gotten the blessing of Kubrick. He's one of my idols; simply one of the greatest talents that's ever walked the Earth. He more or less said, 'Sure. Go do it. I don't care.' And another time he said, 'Don't be afraid. Just go do your own movie.'

While he was writing the screenplay in 1983, Hyams (in Los Angeles) began communicating with Clarke (in Sri Lanka) via the then-pioneering medium of e-mail using Kaypro II computers and direct-dial modems. They discussed the planning and production of the film almost daily using this method, and their informal, often humorous correspondence was published in 1984 as The Odyssey File. As it focuses on the screenwriting and pre-production process, the book terminates on February 7, 1984, just before the movie was about to start filming, though it does include 16 pages of behind-the-scenes photographs from the film. Clarke's preface offers a gleeful, elaborate primer on the use of electronic mail.

Principal photography on the film began in February 1984 for a 71-day schedule. Most of the film was shot on MGM's soundstages in Culver City, California, with the exception of a week of location work in Washington, DC, Rancho Palos Verdes, California, and at the Very Large Array in New Mexico. Hyams had originally intended to film the opening scene at the Arecibo Observatory in Puerto Rico, which at the time housed the world's largest radio telescope, but after visiting there in 1983, he told Clarke that the site was unsuitable for filming because it was so filthy. Filming the dolphins described in Clarke's novel was difficult. Hyams nearly used an orangutan in prosthetics to mimic a highland gorilla as a substitute, but Clarke worried it would prompt comparisons to the opening sequence of 2001. The pair discussed using animals like penguins and bees until Hyams finally got MGM to let him build a set around the old Esther Williams tank on the back lot.

Video Image (also known as VIFX), which would go on to work on a number of major pictures and briefly become 20th Century Fox's in-house visual effects studio, did its first work on this film, designing the video screen graphics.

=== Music ===
Tony Banks, keyboardist for the band Genesis, was initially commissioned to do the soundtrack for the film. However, Banks' material was rejected and David Shire was then selected to compose and conduct the score, which he co-produced along with Craig Huxley. The soundtrack album was released by A&M Records.

Unlike many film soundtracks up until then, the soundtrack for 2010: The Year We Make Contact was composed for and played mainly using digital synthesizers. These included the Synclavier by the New England Digital company and a Yamaha DX1. Only two compositions on the soundtrack album feature a symphony orchestra. Shire and Huxley were so impressed by the realistic sound of the Synclavier that they placed a disclaimer in the album's liner notes stating, "No resynthesis or sampling was employed on the Synclavier."

The Police's guitarist Andy Summers performed a track entitled "2010", which is a new-wave pop version of Richard Strauss's Also sprach Zarathustra (that had been the main theme from 2001: A Space Odyssey). Though Summers' recording was included on the soundtrack album and released as a single, it was not used in the film. For the B-side to the single, Summers recorded another 2010-based track entitled "To Hal and Back", though this appeared in neither the film nor the soundtrack album.

== Release ==
=== Box office ===
2010: The Year We Make Contact debuted at number two at the North American box office, taking $7,393,361 for its opening weekend. It was held off from the top spot by Beverly Hills Cop, which became that year's highest-grossing film in North America. During its second week, the film faced competition from two other new sci-fi films: John Carpenter's Starman and David Lynch's Dune, but ultimately outgrossed both by the end of its domestic theatrical run. It finished with just over $40 million at the domestic box office and was the 17th-highest-grossing film in North America to be released in 1984.

=== Comic book ===
In 1984, Marvel Comics published a 48-page comic-book adaptation of the film by writer J. M. DeMatteis and artists Joe Barney, Larry Hama, and Tom Palmer. It was published both as a single volume in Marvel Super Special #37 and as a two-issue miniseries.

=== Video games ===
A text-based game was also released based on the film, titled 2010: The Text Adventure Game, followed by a graphical version titled 2010: The Graphic Action Game. Both games were developed by Coleco Industries and released for the Coleco Adam.

In January 1985, Coleco released the video game 2010: The Graphic Action Game for the ColecoVision console. It is a puzzle/maze game featuring elements from 2010: Odyssey Two, in which the player must save the Discovery from crashing onto the surface of Io, Jupiter's volcanic moon.

=== Home media ===
2010: The Year We Make Contact was first released on home video and Laserdisc in 1985, and on DVD (R1) in 1998 by Metro-Goldwyn-Mayer. It was reissued (with different artwork) in September 2000. Both releases are presented with the soundtrack remastered in Dolby 5.1 surround sound and in the original 2.35:1 aspect ratio, though a packaging error appears on the 2000 Warner release, claiming that the film is presented in anamorphic widescreen when, in reality, it is simply 4:3 letterboxed and not anamorphic (the MGM version of the DVD makes no such claim). The R1 and R4 releases also include the film trailer and a 10-minute behind-the-scenes featurette 2010: The Odyssey Continues (made at the time of the film's production), though this is not available in other regions.

The film was released on Blu-ray Disc on April 7, 2009. It features a BD-25 single-layer presentation, now in high-definition 16:9 (2.40:1) widescreen with 1080p/VC-1 video and English Dolby TrueHD 5.1 Surround audio. In all regions, the disc also includes the film's original "making of" promotional featurette (as above) and theatrical trailer in standard definition as extras.

== Reception ==
=== Critical reception ===
Critical reception to 2010: The Year We Make Contact was mixed. On the review aggregator website Rotten Tomatoes, 68% of 37 critics' reviews are positive, with an average rating of 5.80/10. The website's consensus reads: "2010 struggles to escape from the shadow of its monolithic predecessor, but offers brainy adventure in a more straightforward voyage through the cosmos." Metacritic, which uses a weighted average, assigned the film a score of 53 out of 100, based on 15 critics, indicating "mixed or average" reviews. Critics generally considered the film inferior to 2001: A Space Odyssey, and felt its story was "too literal in laboriously explaining" the mysteries of the original film. Syd Mead's designs for the film received critical acclaim.

Roger Ebert gave 2010: The Year We Make Contact three stars out of four, writing, "It doesn't match the poetry and the mystery of the original film, but it does continue the story, and it offers sound, pragmatic explanations for many of the strange and visionary things in 2001." He praised it as a "triumph of hardware, of special effects, of slick, exciting filmmaking". Ebert also wrote it "has an ending that is infuriating, not only in its simplicity, but in its inadequacy to fulfill the sense of anticipation, the sense of wonder we felt at the end of 2001". He concluded, however: "And yet the truth must be told: This is a good movie. Once we've drawn our lines, once we've made it absolutely clear that 2001 continues to stand absolutely alone as one of the greatest movies ever made, once we have freed 2010 of the comparisons with Kubrick's masterpiece, what we are left with is a good-looking, sharp-edged, entertaining, exciting space opera".

Colin Greenland reviewed 2010 for Imagine, calling it "a tense space drama with excellent performances from Helen Mirren and John Lithgow, and glorious special effects. For everyone who was mystified by 2001."

John Nubbin reviewed 2010 for Different Worlds magazine and stated that "It was a good, common denominator film. Despite its too happy ending, it is well-deserving of the praise it received, and little-deserving of any strong criticism. A good, solid picture, the kind we need a lot more of."

James Berardinelli also gave the film three stars out of four, writing, "2010 continues 2001 without ruining it. The greatest danger faced by filmmakers helming a sequel is that a bad installment will in some way sour the experience of watching the previous movie. This does not happen here. Almost paradoxically, 2010 may be unnecessary, but it is nevertheless a worthwhile effort." He wrote that the visual effects "are as good as, although not noticeably better than, those used in 2001".

Reviewing the film for BBC, Almar Haflidason praised the film's cinematography and visual effects. He stated, "by writing, producing and directing a follow-up to 2001, [Hyams] was really putting his head on the block if he screwed it up. Thankfully for him he didn't." Through narrative storytelling, Haflidason describes the film as a chance for Clarke and Hyams to explain what 2001 was about. The review praises Hyams's narrative-based handling of the tension between the Soviet and American teams, and says his "skills as a cinematographer are evident with fine visual effects throughout."

A review in Time Out describes a film that, while not as revolutionary as its predecessor, "is still a better film than anyone could have dared to expect", and declaring it as "space fiction of a superior kind".

Other critics had more negative opinions. Vincent Canby of The New York Times gave 2010: The Year We Make Contact a mediocre review, calling it "a perfectly adequate though not really comparable sequel" that "is without wit, which is not to say that it is witless. A lot of care has gone into it, but it has no satirical substructure to match that of the Kubrick film, and which was eventually responsible for that film's continuing popularity."

Variety considered the film a mess, although not without bright spots, writing: "In Peter Hyams' hands [working from a novel by Arthur C. Clarke], the HAL mystery is the most satisfying substance of the film and handled the best. Unfortunately, it lies amid a hodge-podge of bits and pieces." TIME was dismissive, writing, "Flash: There is intelligent life in outer space. More, anyway, than in this amiable footnote of a movie."

=== Awards and nominations ===
2010: The Year We Make Contact was nominated for five Academy Awards:

- Best Art Direction (Art Direction: Albert Brenner; Set Decoration: Rick Simpson)
- Best Costume Design (Patricia Norris)
- Best Makeup (Michael Westmore)
- Best Sound (Michael J. Kohut, Aaron Rochin, Carlos Delarios and Gene Cantamessa)
- Best Visual Effects (Richard Edlund, Neil Krepela, George Jenson and Mark Stetson)

The film was also nominated for three Saturn Awards: Best Science Fiction Film, Best Costumes (Patricia Norris), and Best Special Effects (Richard Edlund).

It won the Hugo Award for Best Dramatic Presentation in 1985.
