= 2061: Odyssey Three =

1987 novel by British writer Arthur C. Clarke

- Cover of the first edition
- Author: Arthur C. Clarke
- Illustrator: Michael Whelan
- Language: English
- Series: The Space Odyssey series
- Genre: Science fiction
- Publisher: Del Rey
- Publication date: December 1987
- Publication place: United Kingdom
- Media type: Print (hardback & paperback)
- Pages: 256
- ISBN: 0-345-35173-8
- OCLC: 16756201
- Dewey Decimal: 823/.914 19
- LC Class: PR6005.L36 A617 1988
- Preceded by: 2010: Odyssey Two
- Followed by: 3001: The Final Odyssey

2061: Odyssey Three is a science fiction novel by the British writer Arthur C. Clarke, published in 1987. It is the third book in Clarke's Space Odyssey series. It returns to one of the lead characters of the previous novels, Heywood Floyd, and his adventures from the 2061 return of Halley's Comet to Jupiter's moon Europa.

Clarke had originally intended to write the third book after NASA's Galileo mission to Jupiter had returned its findings in the late 1980s. The probe had been initially scheduled for launch in 1984 but this was delayed, first to 1985 and then to 1986. It was delayed further in wake of the Space Shuttle Challenger disaster. Deciding not to wait, Clarke took inspiration for his sequel from the return of Halley's Comet. Galileo was eventually launched by Space Shuttle Atlantis on the STS-34 mission in October 1989. It arrived in Jovian orbit almost eight years after the publication of 2061: Odyssey Three.

== Plot ==
The opening chapters of 2061 gradually explain the events that have taken place in the interim years. The new sun, dubbed "Lucifer", has transformed the moons of the former Jupiter: Io is a volcanic hellhole, Europa an ocean world shrouded by clouds, and Ganymede a temperate world that the human race is colonizing. Large-scale interplanetary travel is now commercially viable with muon-catalyzed fusion-powered spacecraft. Humanity is wary of sending spacecraft close to Europa despite its fascinating mysteries, including the appearance of a large mountain, dubbed "Mount Zeus", on its surface. On Earth, a period of relative peace has been achieved among the United States, Soviet Union and China, although a peaceful revolution has taken place in South Africa (now called the United States of Southern Africa or USSA); the white population has fled, taking most of the country's wealth with them and leaving the black population to rebuild the economy, which they do in a matter of weeks thanks to the country's diamond mines.

Dr. Heywood Floyd, the protagonist of 2010, has had an accident and becomes a permanent resident of an orbital space hospital. His estranged grandson, Chris II, works aboard the spacecraft Galaxy. Now, at the age of 103, Floyd is chosen as one of six "celebrity guests" to travel aboard the privately owned spaceliner Universe for the first-ever human landing on the surface of Halley's Comet as it again nears Earth. The Universe lands on Halley, and the crew explores its surface and its caves.

On Ganymede, Rolf van der Berg, a second-generation Afrikaner refugee, studies data on satellite surveys of Mount Zeus and forms an astonishing thesis about its nature. He communicates his discovery to his uncle Paul Kreuger, and van der Berg is also invited to join the crew of the spacecraft Galaxy for its flyby of Europa. As Galaxy nears Europa, Rosie, a stewardess, attempts to hijack the craft, forcing it to crash into Europa's ocean. Failing in her plan, she commits suicide, and the Galaxy's crew is stranded. Observing the burgeoning aquatic life forms of Europa, the crew pilots Galaxy to an island that they name Haven.

Universe abandons its exploration of Halley to rescue Galaxy. After siphoning water from Halley's vents to refuel, Universe heads directly for Europa. During the flight, the celebrity passengers discuss the mystery surrounding Dave Bowman and the monoliths, and whether they would be allowed to land on Europa to rescue Galaxy's crew. Floyd follows a suggestion that he simply try to call Bowman on the radio, and later has a strange dream in which he sees a small monolith floating at the foot of his bed.

On Europa, Van der Berg and Chris Floyd take the shuttle William Tsung (nicknamed Bill Tee) to study Mount Zeus. Near Mount Zeus, van der Berg relays the message "LUCY IS HERE" to his uncle Paul. It is revealed that Van der Berg's hypothesis, now proven true, was that Mount Zeus is one huge diamond, a remnant from the core of the exploded Jupiter. The revelation about Mount Zeus explains how Van der Berg got onto Galaxy and why Rosie tried to hijack it; the rulers of the USSA are concerned and the exiled Afrikaners are interested about what might happen to the world diamond market if a vast mountain of diamond were discovered.

Travelling further, the two men find the wreck of the Chinese spacecraft Tsien, which has been completely stripped of its metals, and then find the enormous monolith lying on its side at the border between the dayside and nightside, dubbed the "Great Wall". Beneath it is a town of igloo-like dwellings, but the inhabitants are not in sight. There, Chris sees an image of his grandfather, who tells him that the Universe is coming.

Universe rescues Galaxy's crew; they are brought to Ganymede, where they watch as Mount Zeus, which has been steadily sinking, finally disappears beneath the Europan surface. Kreuger writes a follow-up article for Nature, stating that Mount Zeus was a mere fragment of Jupiter's diamond material, and that it is almost certain that many more such large pieces of diamond are currently in orbit around Lucifer. Kreuger therefore proposes a scouting project to seek diamond in the Lucifer system, for eventual mining.

Floyd, Chris, and van der Berg become close. In a later chapter, another Heywood Floyd, now a disembodied creature of pure consciousness, talks with Dave Bowman. It is revealed that the small monolith duplicated Floyd's consciousness; there are now two Heywood Floyds, one an immortal being who resides with Bowman and HAL inside the Great Wall, another who will live and die without knowing this. Bowman shows Floyd images of his experience of studying the life forms of Jupiter before they were killed in the creation of Lucifer, explaining that the monolith weighed the Jovians against the Europans and decided the latter held more promise. Bowman states that during the diamond meteor impact, the immensely powerful monolith tipped over on its side, and may be damaged. He and HAL believe that when Lucifer begins to fail, the monolith will weigh the Europans against humanity and they have only about a thousand years to prepare for that moment.

In an epilogue, set in 3001, the original monolith discovered on the Moon in 1999 has been placed in the plaza of the ancient United Nations Building. Humans have found more quantities of diamond from the former Jupiter and have used it to create space elevators and an orbital ring connecting them, as suggested by Kreuger. Suddenly, Lucifer's light begins to fade and the Monolith reawakens for the first time in a thousand years.

=== Outside references to scientific literature ===
Late in the novel (Chapter 56, "Perturbation Theory"), two real scientific articles are explicitly cited by Paul Krueger, van der Berg's uncle. A 1981 article in Nature lends plausibility to 2061's basic premise that other solar system bodies may contain massive quantities of diamond material, and serves as the basis for 2061's premise of a large diamond being discovered on Europa. A 1966 article in Science examines the feasibility of various materials for the theoretical construction of a space elevator, identifying diamond as the best available known material, and likewise serves as a basis for the space elevators (or towers) which extend from Earth's surface out into space.

The elevators are major pieces of technology in the sequel novel 3001, and settings of much of the latter novel's action. The intervening implication is that over the next millennium, humanity finds other large sources of diamond in the Lucifer–Jupiter system, precipitate which resulted from the transformation of the latter into the former, and mines this diamond material, using it for (previously impossible) construction projects.

== Characters ==
=== Main characters ===
- Dr. Heywood Floyd: Floyd is an elderly man, world-famous for his involvement with the Discovery and Leonov missions. His life has been extended because he has lived off Earth in lower gravity (which simultaneously prevents him from ever returning to Earth itself). Floyd travels with five other celebrities to Halley's Comet during its Earth approach aboard the Universe, a new, state-of-the-art spacecraft financed by the Tsung family.
- Christopher Floyd II is Floyd's grandson who hops various space flights and quietly finds work without keeping up with his family, to their dismay. He is second officer of the Galaxy, an older craft also financed by the Tsung family. He is estranged from his grandfather Heywood. One of the novel's themes, therefore, is that the protagonist reconnects with his family after years of estrangement both from them and from Earth.
- Rolf van der Berg is a Ganymede-based planetary scientist who develops a shocking theory regarding a structure on Europa. He has the opportunity to confirm his theory that Europa contains a giant diamond, a byproduct of Jupiter's collapse to become the small star Lucifer.

=== Minor characters ===
- The Floyd Family: Early in the novel, Floyd's now-long-distant old family lives are re-capitulated. Marion, his first wife, had long since been killed in a plane crash, and their two daughters now have families of their own, and are effectively estranged from Floyd. Further, during the events of 2010, Floyd's second wife Caroline and their son Christopher I had learned to forget about him; Caroline took up with another man in Floyd's absence, and Christopher I found his father-figure in this man. Later, Chris I married one Helena, an arrangement of which both Floyd and Caroline had initially disapproved. Despite this, Helena proved to be a good mother to Christopher II.
- The Tsung Family: Family of Sir Lawrence Tsung, Chinese tycoon benefactor and shipbuilder, responsible for financing the story's spacecraft, the Cosmos, the Galaxy and the Universe. The Tsung family do not directly feature in the story, apart from being mentioned for their financial backing role, and in general descriptions of geopolitics. Lawrence is inspired to finance the development of spacecraft after reviewing the history of the Tsien disaster, which centers around the dramatic death of Rupert Chang (now identified with his first name in this novel), which had occurred in the previous novel and is retold in the current one. Tsung's wife is one Lady Jasmine; children include William Tsung, Charles Tsung and several unnamed siblings (in all, five brothers and five sisters), each subsequent birth requiring a very large, doubled fee per a modification of China's One-child policy.
- The Leonov Crew: It is established very early on that all of the Leonov crew of 2010 have since died, with the lone exceptions of Floyd and Zenia Marchenko, the latter not otherwise figuring in the present story. In particular, it is revealed that Dr. Chandra died in hibernation during the Leonov's return trip, which is attributed to his sadness at losing HAL.
- Captain Smith: Captain of the Universe, Smith is a practical, stock captain character, concerned for the safety of his ship, his crew and his passengers.
- Yva Merlin, aka Evelyn Miles: A rather mysterious, aged movie star, who is emblazoned on the public consciousness for her earlier roles. Merlin joins the Universe voyage as one of its celebrity passengers.
- Dimitri Mihailovich: A classical composer who provides some comic relief, Mihailovich is another of the celebrity passengers. The name and minor character role echo the basic plot function of Dimitri Moisevitch, of the earlier works.
- Victor Willis: A pop-science personality with a prodigious beard, Willis is another of the celebrity passengers.
- Clifford Greenberg: First man to set foot on Mercury, "Cliff" is another of the celebrity passengers. He later becomes an honorary crew-member and is a more "useful" passenger due to his spaceflight experience.
- Margeret M'Bala: An author who popularized and explained the connections between ancient Greek and Roman mythology and now-common astronomical nomenclature, "Maggie M" is another of the celebrity passengers.
- George and Jerry: An old gay couple who are two of Floyd's longest and closest friends; they had worked in the arts in earlier life. George and Jerry help to manage Floyd's personal affairs while he is away.
- Eric Laplace: Captain of the Galaxy.
- Rosie: A stewardess who hijacks the Galaxy. Although her motives are never made perfectly clear, context strongly suggests that Rosie is affiliated with a South African faction of some kind, who have somehow learned of van der Berg's Europan diamond theory and want to make an investigation of their own. Shortly after her introduction, the character is inconsistently named as Rose McMahon or Rose McCullen. Later, the hijacker is identified as one Ruth Mason.
- Second Officer Walter Chang: Not to be confused with the Tsien astronaut, Walter Chang is the Galaxy pilot on duty when Rosie hijacks the ship and is charged by Rosie with landing on Europa.
- Paul Kreuger: van der Berg's uncle, Kreuger is entrusted with the secret of Europa's diamond deposit early on, and later opines in a letter to Nature on the implications of large quantities of diamond for construction, citing two real scientific papers.

== Adaptations ==
In 2000, Yahoo! reported that MGM and actor/director Tom Hanks were in discussions regarding adapting both 2061: Odyssey Three and 3001: The Final Odyssey into movies, with Hanks reportedly to play Frank Poole in the 3001 film. An update in 2001 stated that there was no further development on the project.
