= Matty Mo =

American artist

Matty Monahan
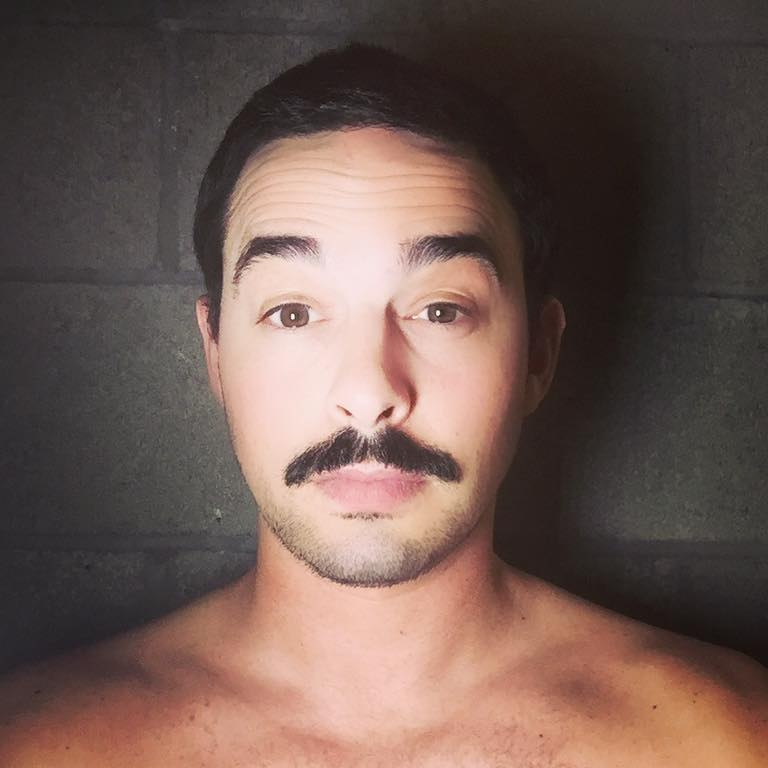
- Mo in 2018
- Born: 1985 or 1986 (age 40–41); Boston, Massachusetts
- Known for: street art, contemporary art, collaborations
- Movement: contemporary art, street art
- Website: themostfamousartist.com

Matty Monahan (known professionally as Matty Mo) is a Los Angeles–based contemporary artist and marketing entrepreneur best known for creating the conceptual art group "The Most Famous Artist". Through this group, Monahan makes and promotes art installations, exhibitions, performance art, and publicity stunts to bring attention to how technology and the Internet impact society. That same year, ABC News reported on his large-scale public installation in Los Angeles where he painted three residential homes bright pink as a commentary on class, community and digital legacy. Monahan's "#selfiewall" in the Venice Beach neighborhood in Los Angeles was dubbed by Los Angeles Magazine as being "The Most Instagramable Wall in L.A." and ABC's Nightline said his art is an "instagramer's dream."

== Early life ==
Monahan attended Stanford University and had a career in advertising technology.

== "The Most Famous Artist" ==
Monahan launched his platform, "The Most Famous Artist," in 2013 when he began taking preexisting paintings and adding something to them or painting over their surface. This concept of appropriation is a longstanding one in art history and was used by iconic artists such as Marcel Duchamp and Andy Warhol. Mohanan, however, adds an awareness of digital promotion and social media to this technique that modernizes its impact.

=== "100 Thousand Dollars" (2016) ===
In 2016, Mohanan created ten works, each one resembling a stack of one thousand $100 bills; however, only the bills on the top and bottom of the stacks were visible making their literal monetary value a mystery. The stacks were priced at $5,000 each and the first sold within twenty minutes of being posted on Instagram. While buyers could look through the stacks of cash to count their actual monetary value, Mohanan added a seal to each piece that keeps all the bills together and said it will become an illegitimate art object should that seal be broken.

=== "The Pink House" (2017) ===
In 2017, "The Most Famous Artist" group painted three houses in a Los Angeles residential neighborhood bright pink that were scheduled for demolition and to be replaced by a high-end apartment building. The installation was embraced on social media but also seen as an important lens on gentrification and community displacement.

=== "Artificial Intelligence: THE END OF ART AS WE KNOW IT" (2017) ===
In 2017, the group mounted a solo exhibition at The McLoughlin Gallery in San Francisco where they partnered with anonymous hackers to build an artificial intelligence capable of analyzing and reproducing art styles of iconic artists, such as Chuck Close. The first group of images is a series of portraits of people, including: factory workers, art dealers, pilots, artists and taxi drivers, whose jobs could one day by eliminated by artificial intelligence. This exhibition serves as starting point for a discussion about the challenges facing humanity in light of big data, AI and robots. In 2019, one of the artworks from this exhibition, an AI-created portrait of Mark Zuckerberg, was featured on the cover of Rotman Management Magazine.

=== "The Private Jet Experience" (2018) ===
Simulating the experience of flying on a luxury private jet, the group built an interactive installation that, when photographed from a particular angle, makes participants appear to be on a luxury Gulfstream G3. The purpose of the experience is entirely for social media optics, an approach Forbes called "brilliantly outrageous." The work was installed in the Fred Segal store in Los Angeles and is set to travel around the country, including Miami Beach during Art Basel in 2018.

=== "The Fyre Experience" (2019) ===
As homage to the Fyre Festival in 2017, The Most Famous Artist built a selfie-centric installation satirizing the failed music event. The installation recreated infamous details from Fyre Festival as possible: cardboard cutouts of celebrities who endorsed the festival, cheese sandwiches in polystyrene containers, stacks of fake money, a simulated hot tub full of Evian bottles and a sandy beach with a Bahamas background.

Also in 2019, Hulu and Netflix each released documentaries on the failure, Fyre Fraud and Fyre: The Greatest Party That Never Happened, which partially inspired this project.

=== "Matty Marries Miley" (2019) ===
Nearing the one-year anniversary of Miley Cyrus's short lived marriage to Liam Hemsworth, Monahan proposed to Cyrus on social media--a stunt to amplify his credibility as a performance artist. Cyrus publicly responded to the post, saying “it probably won’t last long, but always down to try. You miss 100% of the shots you don’t take.”

=== "The Monolith" (2020) ===
In 2016, a metal pillar that came to be known as the Utah monolith was placed in a remote sandstone slot canyon in San Juan County, Utah. Since then, similar mysterious and unauthorized pillars have appeared in California, Nevada, the United Kingdom, Romania and the Netherlands. Monahan, as "The Most Famous Artist", initially took credit for installing the monolith but later admitted that the work was not his.

== Public Speaking ==
In 2016, Crystal Bridges Museum of American Art's Artinfusion Insight program hosted Monahan to speak about his innovative use of social media in his art and, in 2017, he delivered lectures at Sotheby's Institute of Art and at the Tech Open Air conference in Berlin.

== ABC's Nightline, 2019 ==
ABC News produced the video, "Meet Matty Mo, 'The Most Famous Artist' you've never heard of," the most comprehensive account of Monahan's platform and art to date. In the interview, Monahan discusses the integral role the internet plays in his installations but also the ways in which he is inspired by, and further extends, concepts derived from art history. Specifically, Monahan explores art monetization in a manner similar to Kaws, participatory installations similar to Yayoi Kusama, and headlines and stunts to broaden his message similar to Banksy's approach.
