= List of works similar to the 2020 Utah monolith =

Series of art installations

List of monoliths
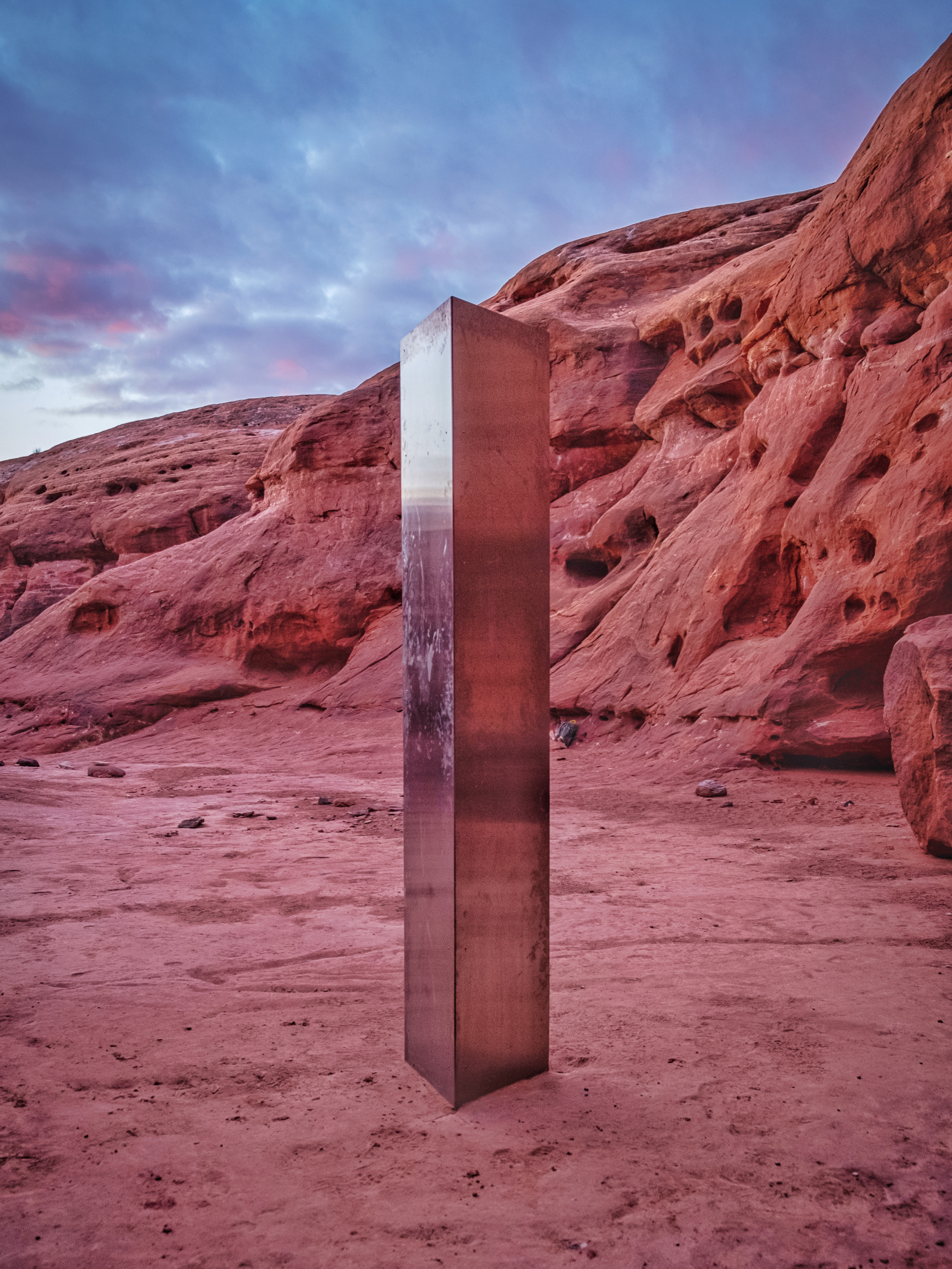
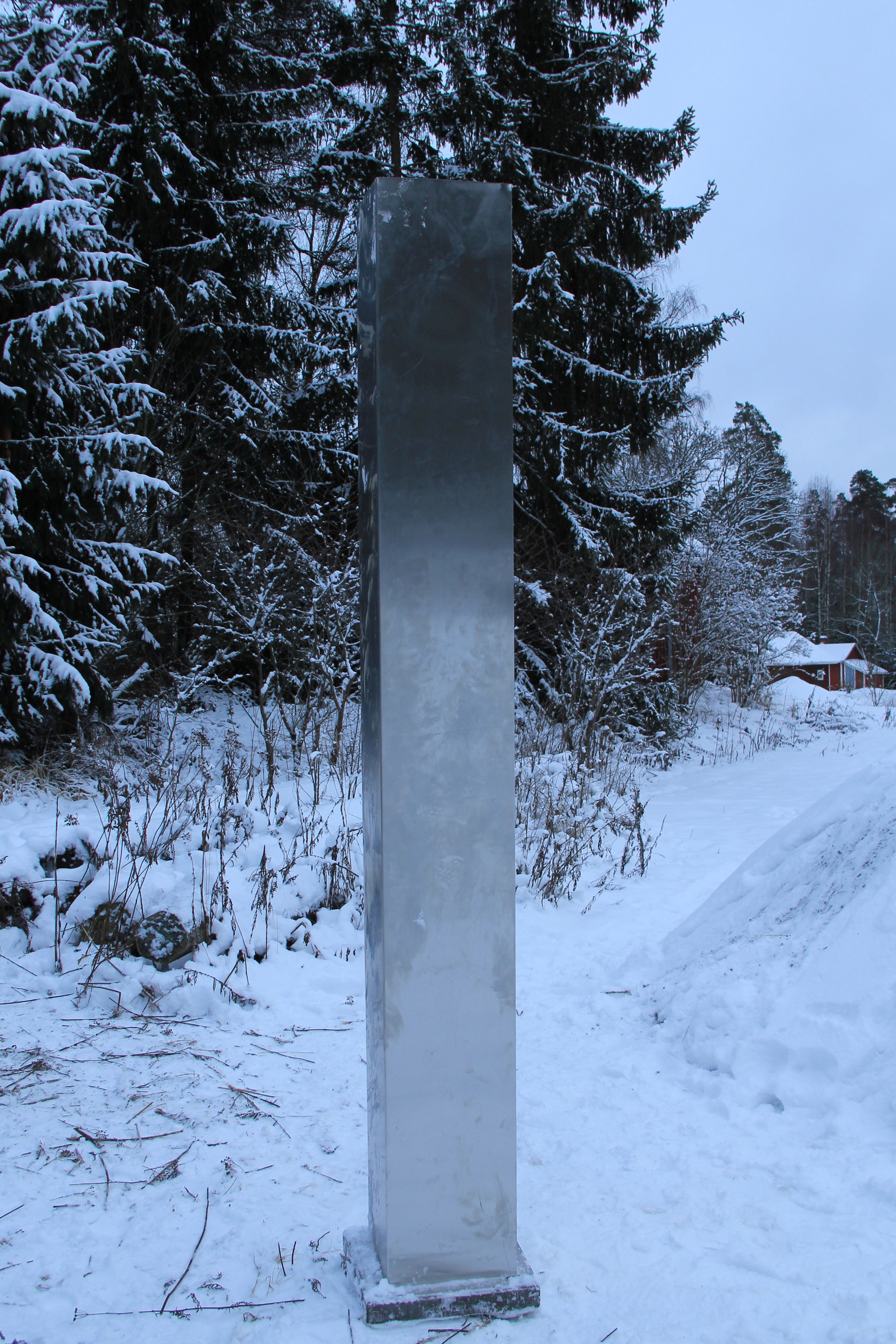
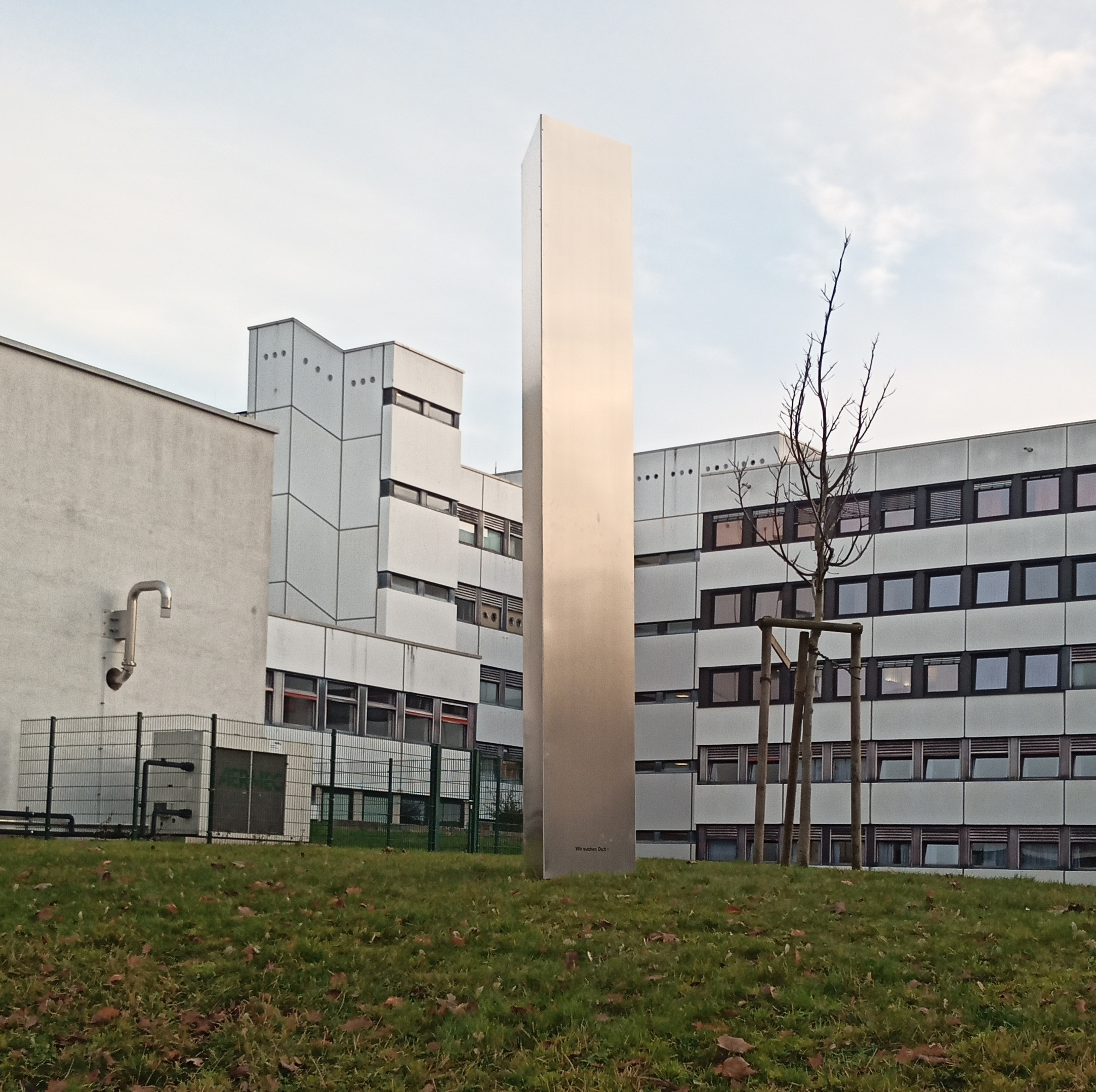
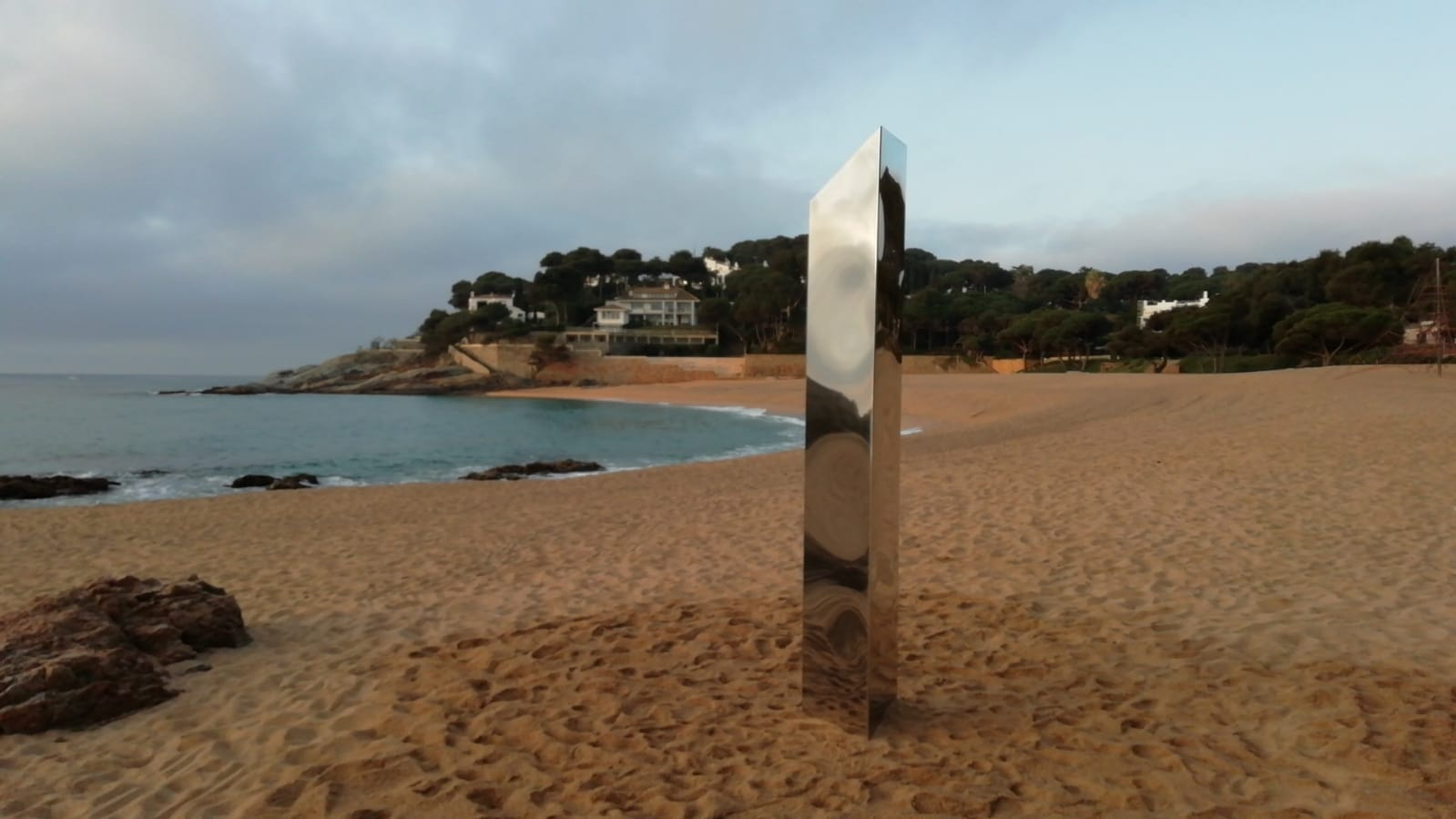
- The first monolith, found in Utah; Monolith in Nurmijärvi, Finland; Monolith near Knappschaftskrankenhaus Lütgendortmund (Germany); Monolith in Sa Conca (Castell-Platja d'Aro)
- Year: 2020–2021
- Type: Metal sculptures
- Medium: Stainless steel or aluminum (assumed)
- Location: Original monolith found in San Juan County, Utah, United States; similar artifacts subsequently reported worldwide

In late 2020, the appearance of a series of metal columns was reported internationally. Referred to as "monoliths", these sheet metal structures began to be constructed in the wake of the discovery of the Utah monolith, a 3 m (9.8 ft)-tall pillar made of metal sheets riveted into a triangular prism, placed in a red sandstone slot canyon in northern San Juan County, Utah. The structure was placed there sometime between July and October 2016 based on images from Google Earth, but only attracted media attention after it was reported in late November 2020 by state biologists who discovered it during a helicopter survey of wild bighorn sheep.

Soon after the Utah discovery on November 18, 2020, reports emerged on social media of similar metal columns being found in many other places throughout the world, including locations across North America, South America, Central America and Europe. Over two hundred similar metal columns have been reported from various locations around the world.

The origins of these structures varied; some monoliths were made by artists inspired by news coverage of the original Utah pillar; others, like the two Pittsburgh monoliths, were made by local businesses for promotional purposes. Some monoliths were subsequently removed. Despite the word monolith referring to a single great stone, these sculptures were mostly made from metal, and the name derives from the Monolith that appeared in the 1968 science fiction film, 2001: A Space Odyssey. This connection gave rise to speculation about an extraterrestrial origin, although the phenomenon has also been viewed as a craze or an Internet hoax, with a number of features in common with crop circles.

== List by location ==
Since November 2020, monoliths similar to the one found in Utah have been reported internationally.

=== Asia ===
Country	Year	Date	Location	Notes	Status	Refs
India	2020	December 29	Ahmedabad, Gujarat	One monolith appeared in Symphony Forest Park in Ahmedabad. One of the panels features etched numbers, relating to longitudes and latitudes of wildlife parks in India. The anonymous artist said in an interview that "The monolith is shrouded in mystery around the world because people enjoy the mystery of unlocking new ideas and unlocking new thoughts. And this was my contribution to that – engagement of thinking." It disappeared on 13 January leaving a metallic sphere in its place.	Removed	
India	2021	March 10	Bandra, Mumbai	The monolith in Jogger's Park was triangular-shaped and around 7 feet (2.1 m) tall with numbers on the side. After two weeks, it disappeared and was replaced with a metallic sphere, much like the one in Ahmedabad.	Removed	
Iran	2020	December 14	Niknam-Deh	A monolith appeared on top of a valley in Niknam-Deh, a small village approximately 15 kilometers east of Tehran. The monolith was 3 meters in height and has been engraved with the letters "N" and "S", representing the directions north and south, respectively.		
Turkey	2021	February 5	Göbekli Tepe	A monolith was discovered in Göbekli Tepe with text written in Old Turkic script saying, "If you want to see the moon, look up to sky". It disappeared within a few days.	Removed	

=== Africa ===
Country	Year	Date	Location	Notes	Status	Refs
Democratic Republic of the Congo	2021	February 17	Kinshasa	A monolith was found at a roundabout in the Democratic Republic of Congo's capital Kinshasa. The monolith was burned down by locals agitated by its sudden appearance.	Destroyed	
Morocco	2020	December 10	Zenata	A monolith was reported in a construction site in Zenata near Casablanca. Upon investigation, it was determined that the structure was installed by the chemicals and logistics company Top Negoce as part of a communication campaign for its new robot Aya.		

=== Europe ===
Country	Year	Date	Location	Notes	Status	Refs
Austria	2020	December 6, 2020	Katschberg	A monolith appeared in Katschberg, near the B99 road, and disappeared shortly after.	Removed	
Austria	2020	December 10	Tamsweg, Salzburg	The same monolith previously seen in Katschberg was spotted on a golf course in the district of Tamsweg, Salzburg.		
Austria	2020	December 14	Peuerbach	Another monolith was found on a field in Peuerbach in Upper Austria.		
Austria	2021	January 16	Nauders	The Nauders monolith was found on a ski slope at an altitude of 2,450 meters (8,040 ft).		
Austria	2021	February 7	St. Gertraudi	The monolith appeared in the middle of a snowy field, reportedly without any tracks in the snow around it.		
Belgium	2020	December 8	Baasrode, East Flanders	The Baasrode monolith was found in the middle of a muddy potato field. It was removed soon after by the carnival group D’Omerkes, who had erected it and were concerned it would be damaged or stolen.	Removed by artist	
Belgium	2020	December 10	Kanne, Limburg	This monolith was significantly smaller than the other ones.		
Belgium	2020	December 29	Maaseik, Limburg	Unique to this appearance is that it also has a Latin saying: 'Fortis in unum' which means 'as one we are strong'.		
Czech Republic	2020	December 12	Zlín	A monolith was discovered between town Otrokovice and village called Tečovice in the middle of a field.		
Finland	2020	December 10	Savonlinna	A monolith was discovered in the Kyrönniemi recreation area but disappeared within a week.	Removed	
Finland	2020	December 12	Virrat	This monolith was found in the middle of a protected field in the small town of Virrat.		
Finland	2020	December 18	Uusimaa/Kanta-Häme	A monolith was found in the field between Riihimäki and Hyvinkää.		
Finland	2021	January 6	Nurmijärvi	A monolith was discovered at the intersection of Kirkkotie and Järventaustantie in Nurmijärvi, about 30 kilometers north of Helsinki.		
Finland	2021	January 19	Hamina	A monolith was discovered at the Neuvoton neighborhood in Hamina, a town near the city of Kotka.		
France	2020	December 5	Exireuil, Deux-Sèvres	Local artisan welder Ludovic Liaigre later revealed himself to be the creator.		
France	2020	December 9	Le Havre, Normandy	A 2.5-meter-tall (8.2 ft) monolith was found in Le Havre and later revealed to be an installation of Peppergraphik, a local company.		
France	2020	December 9	Toulouse, Haute-Garonne	A monolith found in Toulouse was revealed to have been installed by the organization that hosts the Bricks Festival.	Removed	
France	2020	December 19	Ambialet, Tarn			
Germany	2020	December 5	Sulzbach, Hesse	A "monolith-like" pillar was discovered on a field near Sulzbach. The pillar was made out of aluminum and had a wooden construction underneath. It was destroyed by vandals.	Destroyed	
Germany	2020	December 10	Hohenschwangau, Bavaria	A square monolith was discovered in Hohenschwangau near the Neuschwanstein Castle.		
Germany	2020	December 11	Rostock, Mecklenburg-Vorpommern	A square monolith was discovered near Rostock.		
Germany	2020	December 12	Hamburg	A monolith was discovered in Hamburg and taken down by local police. It was put back into place a few hours later, but disappeared again.	Removed	
Germany	2020	December 12 or 13	Sorpe Dam	A monolith was discovered on the shore of Sorpe Dam and removed on 14 December by the Ruhrverband.	Removed by authorities	
Germany	2020	December 13	Borken, North Rhine-Westphalia	A monolith was discovered in the Gemen District outside Gemen Castle. This monolith seems to have the same mirrorlike qualities as the British one on the Isle of Wight. It appeared close to a religious educational center for children.		
Germany	2020	December 14	Pohlheim	A black monolith was discovered next to a daycare center in Pohlheim.		
Germany	2020	December 14	Hessigheim	A monolith appeared in Hessigheimer Felsengärten in Hessigheim.		
Germany	2020	December 16	Bad Staffelstein			
Germany	2020	December 22	Heuchelheim, Hesse			
Hungary	2020	December 11	Újpalota, Budapest	A "monolith-like" pillar was discovered on a field in Újpalota. The pillar was hollow, with a metal frame. The hosts of the Hungarian YouTube channel Pamkutya claimed to have constructed it, after the pillar was vandalized and they removed it.	Removed by artist	
Italy	2020	December 3	Lanuvio, Province of Rome	A monolith appeared in the area of Villa Sforza Cesarini. Unlike other monoliths, on both sides of the structure there is incomprehensible writing. On December 8, investigators identified the people behind the installation, a group of artists from Castelli Romani in the Metropolitan City of Rome. The monolith was still in place as of December 5, 2020.		
Italy	2020	December 5 or 6	Neumarkt/Egna in South Tyrol/Alto Adige	Another monolith was discovered in a vineyard near Neumarkt/Egna.		
Italy	2020	December 6	Ferrara	A monolith was found in the town center of Ferrara. Its makers sent a note to local journalists claiming it was built by the X-Files character "Fox Moulder" [sic].		
Italy	2020	December 12	Vigolo Vattaro, Trentino			
Italy	2020	December 24	Aquileia, Friuli-Venezia Giulia			
Netherlands	2020	December 6	Oudehorne	A "monolith-like" pillar was discovered on a nature reserve near Oudehorne.		
Netherlands	2020	December 8	Beneden-Leeuwen, Gelderland	A monolith was discovered in Beneden-Leeuwen. It was removed at the request of a citizen, since it was too close to her house.	Removed by authorities	
Netherlands	2020	December 9	Beneden-Leeuwen, Gelderland	After the December 8 pillar was removed, a pillar—which may or may not have been the same pillar—appeared again in the street not far away, right in front of a restaurant called Meraqi. As of December 15, 2020, the monolith is still there.		
Netherlands	2020	December 11	Oosterhout	A monolith was discovered in Oosterhout, on the grounds of the Galvanitas factory.		
Netherlands	2020	December 16	Kampen	Late in the evening, two men in black with a van were sighted digging a monolith in the center of a roundabout in Kampen. On December 19 it was gone.	Removed	
Norway	2020	December 7	Kristiansand	A monolith appeared outside of a lighting store in Kristiansand. The CCTV footage reportedly cuts out at the time monolith appeared. The store denied any involvement.		
Poland	2020	December 9	Kielce	A steel monolith was discovered at Kadzielnia nature reserve in Kielce and was later fenced off with tape due to a possible increase of radiation in the area.		
Poland	2020	December 9	Warsaw	A monolith was found by passing runners in Warsaw near the Świętokrzyski Bridge. The city denied any involvement. On December 14, the satirical magazine ASZdziennik claimed to have constructed and placed the Warsaw monolith as a symbolic farewell to the year 2020.		
Romania	2020	November 26	Piatra Neamț	A monolith was discovered in Romania on Bâtca Doamnei Hill in the city of Piatra Neamț, near the historical Petrodava Dacian Fortress. The monolith was found on private property and was quoted as having been placed there "illegally". Jurnal FM stated on November 27 that they had actually "received a mail containing a clip and some photos regarding a strange structure found on a hill", on the preceding Tuesday, notably prior to the disappearance of the Utah monolith. The clip points out the structure's similarity to the Utah monolith, while also highlighting major differences in its reflective properties and texture. On November 29, Jurnal FM published an update that the monolith from Romania had also disappeared, mentioning that a "bright light" had been reported, though it did not provide a specific source for that report. "Locals thought the light came from a car, but the light pointed towards the sky. In the morning the place where the monolith stood erect was empty, only a faint imprint remains on the ground covered by snow." On December 1, a local newspaper, Ziar Piatra Neamț, confirmed to Reuters that the Romanian monolith had disappeared. The paper made the additional claim that a "bad local welder" had "apparently" made the item, though that person's identity remains unknown.	Removed	
Romania	2020	December 8	Vadu	A second Romanian monolith appeared in Vadu, on the shore of the Black Sea.		
Slovakia	2020	December 14	Senec	This monolith was discovered at a shopping center.		
Slovakia	2020	December 14	Ružomberok	This monolith was found in the city center.		
Slovenia	2020	December 4	Prlekija	A black-colored monolith appeared in Prlekija.		
Slovenia	2020	December 10	Zagorje ob Savi	A monolith was discovered in the center of Zagorje ob Savi.		
Spain	2020	December 8	Ayllón	A monolith structure was discovered near the town of Ayllón. The local council advised that no one approach the area due to the dangerous landscape. A few hours later, the monolith was removed; the mayor of Ayllón described the incident as a "joke made by villagers".	Removed by authorities	
Spain	2020	December 21	Tribaldos, Cuenca			
Spain	2021	March 30	Costa Brava, Girona	This monolith was found on the Sa Conca beach in Costa Brava.	Stolen	
Sweden	2020	December 9, 2020	Arboga			
Sweden	2020	December 15	Värnamo			
Sweden	2020	December 15	Katrineholm			
Sweden	2020	December 18	Lake Vättern, Huskvarna			
Sweden	2020	December 21	Gotland near Visby			
Switzerland	2020	December 9	Gränichen	A monolith was discovered outside Liebegg Castle.		
United Kingdom	2020	December 6	Isle of Wight	A reflective monolith was found on Compton Beach. This monolith, unlike other installations, was not made of metal, but rather from a wooden plinth covered in mirrored plastic. Two days later, on December 8, it was claimed by local designer Tom Dunford. The monolith sold for £810 via online auction with 53 bids, with the proceeds going to charity.	Removed by artist	
United Kingdom	2020	December 9	Glastonbury, Somerset	A similar monolith was discovered on the peak of Glastonbury Tor. This monolith had the words "Not Banksy" printed across its face and a stylized caricature of a rat at its base. It was removed by the National Trust the same day.	Removed by authorities	
United Kingdom	2020	December 9	Dartmoor	A monolith was spotted on top of a hill near the village of Throwleigh. It was removed by the National Trust shortly after.	Removed by authorities	
United Kingdom	2020	December 11	Croydon, London			
United Kingdom	2020	December 11	St Albans, Hertfordshire	Appeared at a primary school and disappeared again one day later.	Removed	
United Kingdom	2020	December 11	Lerwick, Shetland			
United Kingdom	2021	January 1	Salisbury, Wiltshire	On 3 January the Salisbury monolith was found to have been vandalized. It was damaged beyond repair and had to be removed from its position on the Laverstock Downs.	Destroyed	
United Kingdom	2021	January 1	Sheldon, Birmingham			
United Kingdom	2021	January 1	Sheffield	A monolith made of stainless steel appeared on Parkwood Springs in Sheffield. It disappeared again by 3 January.	Removed	
United Kingdom	2021	January 24	Merseyside	A monolith was found in the dunes on Hightown Beach. The local council removed it shortly after.	Removed by authorities	
United Kingdom	2024	March 12	Powys	A monolith was discovered on the hill Hay Bluff near Hay-on-Wye. It stood at roughly 3 meters tall, and was discovered by a local.		
Ukraine	2020	December 10	Kyiv	A monolith was discovered on top of the Zamkova Hora Hill near the historical Podil district.		
Ukraine	2020	December 10	Poltava	Another monolith was found outside the city in the middle of Makukhiv's landfill.		

=== North America ===
Country	Province/State	Year	Date	Location	Notes	Status	Refs
Canada	Alberta	2020	December 13	Lethbridge		Removed	
Canada	Alberta	2021	January 7	Edmonton	The monolith was 3 meters tall, 125 kg and made of galvanized steel by Brent Siermachesky, the general manager at Alberta Custom Metal Fabricators, who said "this is just a little something to make people chuckle when they drive by and say, 'Hey look, we got one of those in Edmonton now too.'"		
Canada	British Columbia	2020	December 9	Vancouver	A monolith resembling the one found in Utah was found in Vancouver.		
Canada	British Columbia	2020	December 13	Kamloops			
Canada	British Columbia	2020	December 23	Courtenay	A monolith appeared in the Willemar neighborhood.		
Canada	Manitoba	2022	December 7	Manitoba	A monolith was discovered near the Old Pinawa Dam between the cities of Pinawa and Lac du Bonnet which resembled the monolith found in Utah. It had disappeared within 24 hours of being spotted.	Removed	
Canada	Ontario	2020	Mid-December	St. Catharines	A monolith appeared at the Rockway Vineyard Golf Course.	Removed	
Canada	Ontario	2020	December 31	Toronto	A monolith appeared at the Humber Bay Trail. By sunrise on January 1, 2021 it was found vandalized with graffiti. The following day, residents scrubbed it clean to its original state. The next morning, witnesses reported the monolith being removed by the city in a post on the Humber Bay Shores Discussion Facebook page.	Removed	
Canada	Ontario	2021	January 1	Toronto	A new monolith was reported east of the Humber Bay Arch Bridge on the breakwall.		
Canada	Quebec	2020	December 18	Montreal	The monolith was reportedly removed by authorities the morning of December 19.	Removed	
Canada	Saskatchewan	2021	January 5	Saskatoon			
United States	Arkansas	2020	December 13	Eureka Springs	A 3-meter-tall (9.8 ft) monolith was discovered by a local resident who was driving around the farmland. Although of unknown origin, the monolith has undergone much speculation, as the land it currently resides on hosts an annual alien-themed music festival. The owner of the venue claims all entrances and exits to the property are monitored by surveillance equipment; however, they never captured any visitor entering or exiting the campgrounds. It disappeared within a few days.	Removed	
United States	California	2020	December 2	Atascadero	A triangular reflective metal column was found on Pine Mountain. This appeared to be hollow and not secured to the ground. On December 4, three young men from Orange County, referring to themselves as military veterans, livestreamed themselves destroying the monolith on DLive, replacing it with a large wooden cross and chanting "Christ is king!". Members of the group are also heard singing country songs, and were heard saying "we don't want illegal aliens from Mexico or outer space". The group's chants and slang suggest that they were part of the Groyper movement. According to the local mayor, Heather Moreno, "We are upset that these young men felt the need to drive five hours to come into our community and vandalize the monolith ... The monolith was something unique and fun in an otherwise stressful time." On December 5, a group of four artists (Wade McKenzie, Travis Kenney, Randall Kenney and Jared Riddle) declared that they were the creators of the original structure, and after it was toppled, decided to replace it with a new one. According to McKenzie, "We intended for it to be a piece of guerrilla art. But when it was taken down in such a malicious manner, we decided we needed to replace it." The next day, the local deputy city manager, Terrie Banish, said that the city was "happy to see it return".		
United States	California	2020	December 5	San Luis Obispo County	A monolith was found in the Los Padres National Forest. This monolith resembled the monolith in Atascadero, but the structure's top features “CAUTION” written in red and a picture of a UFO, a beam, and a human. Two of the artists tied to the Atascadero piece denied any connection to this monolith, but thought it could be the same monolith taken from Pine Mountain since the original had never been recovered. The monolith was no longer there as of March 3, 2021.	Removed	
United States	California	2020	December 6	Santa Clarita	A monolith was found at Canyon Country Park, but was removed the next morning.	Removed	
United States	California	2020	December 7	Southeastern California	A monolith was found in Joshua Tree National Park.		
United States	California	2020	December 8	San Diego	A monolith was reported in a parking lot at Scripps Ranch Marketplace. It was hauled away that night by an unidentified group.	Removed	
United States	California	2020	December 9	California–Nevada border	A monolith was found on the bank of Lake Tahoe. It was later revealed to be a prank in which the monolith was installed, photographed, and removed in one day, then pictures were posted on social media.	Removed	
United States	California	2020	December 11	Torrance	A monolith was found on Torrance Beach and was quickly removed by the Department of Beaches and Harbors.	Removed	
United States	California	2020	December 25	San Francisco	A "gingerbread monolith" appeared at Corona Heights Park. The structure was made of gingerbread with added frosting and gumdrops, and, although supported by plywood, collapsed the next day.	Collapsed	
United States	Colorado	2020	December 4	Aurora	A monolith appeared outside the Colorado Air and Space Port, northeast of Aurora. It was claimed by Bill Zempel, a mechanic at Mile High Aircraft Services.		
United States	Colorado	2020	December 6	Boulder	Two separate monoliths were reported in Boulder. The first was found in Chatauqua Park, South Boulder. It quickly vanished and a second monolith was found outside of a taco restaurant in Boulder. The similarity and timing of the monoliths has led many to theorize that the same monolith was moved between the two sites.		
United States	Colorado	2024	June	Bellvue, Colorado	The monolith appeared on a dairy farm but was removed within days due to "overwhelming influx" of visitors.	Removed	
United States	Florida	2020	December 13	Gainesville	A monolith was spotted at West Side Park.		
United States	Florida	2020	December 16	Fort Pierce	The monolith appeared in the backyard of a local brewery. It was sold by the brewery owner a month later and donated the $920 earnings to chairty.	Sold	
United States	Georgia	2020	December 14	Newnan	The 2-meter-tall (6.6 ft) triangular structure made of sheet metal was removed by local government officials the following day.	Removed	
United States	Kentucky	2021	May 28	Franklin	A monolith was found in Franklin near the boat ramps on Drakes Creek. The 3-meter-tall (9.8 ft) triangular structure consisted of thick stainless steel panels 40 cm wide.		
United States	Massachusetts	2020	December 19	Quincy	A monolith was found at the Quincy Quarries Reservation. A crop-circle was etched in the snow around it. This monolith was stolen less than 24 hours after its appearance.	Stolen	
United States	Michigan	2020	December 8	Lansing	This monolith had an inscription etched on it directing readers to the official website of the monolith.		
United States	Michigan	2020	December 9	Kentwood			
United States	Michigan	2021	January	Hickory Island	A monolith measuring approximately 8 ft (2.4 m) by 11.5 ft (3.5 m), was found on Hickory Island, near Grosse Ile.		
United States	Missouri	2020	December 26	Sedalia	A monolith found in Liberty Park went unsourced and unclaimed before vanishing on December 30.	Removed	
United States	Nebraska	2020	December 3	Holdrege	This monolith was revealed to have been built by the owner of a local welding company.		
United States	Nevada	2020	Early December 2020	Las Vegas			
United States	Nevada	2024	June	Las Vegas	A reflective monolith was found on a hiking trail north of Las Vegas. The Las Vegas Metropolitan Police Department removed the object "due to public safety and environmental concerns" a few days after it was discovered.	Removed	
United States	New Mexico	2020	December 7	Albuquerque	This monolith was later vandalized and shattered.	Destroyed	
United States	New York	2020	December 15	Ithaca	A monolith was found in McDaniels Park.		
United States	North Carolina	2020	December 3	Fayetteville	A mini-monolith appeared in the center of Fayetteville. This monolith was similar in appearance to the others, but was only 1 meter tall.	Removed	
United States	Oregon	2021	January 5	Hood River	A monolith was found in the parking lot of the local Elks Lodge.		
United States	Pennsylvania	2020	December 3	Pittsburgh	A monolith appeared outside Grandpa Joe's Candy Shop, placed there by the store owner, Chris Beers. Beers explained it was put there to make people to laugh and to bring in business. Beers' monolith was stolen overnight on December 5, but was rebuilt by Beers the next day.		
United States	Texas	2020	Early December 2020	El Paso		Stolen	
United States	Texas	2020	December 3	San Antonio	A pet adoption center saw increased traffic to their website and for adoption appointments after one was placed on their property.		
United States	Texas	2020	December 4	Austin	A monolith was found on the campus of Austin Community College and later revealed to have been built in the college's welding department.		
United States	Texas	2021	January	Fort Worth	A metal monolith appeared next to a trail by the banks of the Trinity River. It was quickly revealed to be a stunt organized through local country music radio station KSCS with the help of high school students from nearby Millsap, Texas.		
United States	Utah	2020	December 4	West Jordan	This monolith was claimed by a local steel manufacturer, Mountain Stainless Inc., as a marketing gimmick.		
United States	Utah	2021	April 3	Cedar City	37.3179604 | 114.9597835.” Further inspection showed that the monolith contained solar panels, which powered a Raspberry Pi to control the monolith. This one was reported to have been vandalized, and had disappeared by late afternoon on April 5, 2021.	Removed	
United States	Vermont	2020	December 12	Pittsfield	A monolith was discovered by a hiker atop a mountain in Pittsfield. It disappeared a few days later but was returned around Christmas Day.		
United States	Washington, D.C.	2020	December 6	Hillcrest	A monolith appeared on the lawn of a home in the Hillcrest neighborhood while the family was out on a walk.		
United States	Wisconsin	2021	January 3	Wauwatosa	A monolith appeared at the County Grounds Park but had disappeared by the following morning.	Removed	

=== Oceania ===
Country	Year	Date	Location	Notes	Status	Refs
Australia	2020	Early December	Melbourne	Australian comedy group Aunty Donna teamed up with the YouTubers behind the channel "I Did a Thing" to erect a monolith on the outskirts of Melbourne, in an effort to promote their Netflix series Aunty Donna's Big Ol' House of Fun.		
Australia	2020	December 10	Adelaide	A monolith was discovered along the Seaford railway line, just south of the Noarlunga Centre. The monolith had four separate coordinates marked on the side. It is believed to be erected separate from the YouTube group, "I Did a Thing," who filmed themselves erecting a monolith outside of Melbourne. The coordinates, from top to bottom, are: (40.7624N, 73.9738W), (15.2413973N, 145.7122932E), (17.75N, 142.5E), (29.97N, 31.1375E). The second coordinate is based on the news report; it is hard to make out from photos and thus can't be verified without a clear photo. These coordinates point approximately to: (1) Trump Tower, New York City, New York, USA, (2) Managaha Island, North Mariana Islands, (3) The Mariana Trench (NW of Managaha Island), (4) The Sphinx in Giza, Egypt. The 3 clear coordinates point in a straight line from Trump Tower to the Sphinx to the Mariana Trench (with the less clear coordinate of Managaha Island being near the Mariana Trench). This monolith was replaced with three metal rebar poles/stakes.	Removed	
New Zealand	2020	December 20	Christchurch	A monolith was discovered at the Christchurch Adventure Park.		

=== Central America and the Caribbean ===
Country	Year	Date	Location	Notes	Status	Refs
Bahamas	2020	December 18	Exuma	A monolith was discovered on Jolly Hall Beach.		
Panama	2020	December 7	Panama City	A monolith structure was found outside of JW Marriott Panama.		

=== South America ===
Country	Year	Date	Location	Notes	Status	Refs
Bolivia	2020	December 16	Santa Cruz	A monolith appeared near the La Pajcha waterfall. Each of the 4 sides shows engraved scriptures in different languages, including Mandarin, Russian, Hebrew, and Arabic. The following day the monolith disappeared leaving only a metal frame behind.	Removed	
Colombia	2020	December 8	Chía, Cundinamarca	A gold-colored monolith appeared in Chía.		
Paraguay	2020	December 11	Paraguarí	The monolith was later removed by local policemen.	Removed	

== Gallery ==
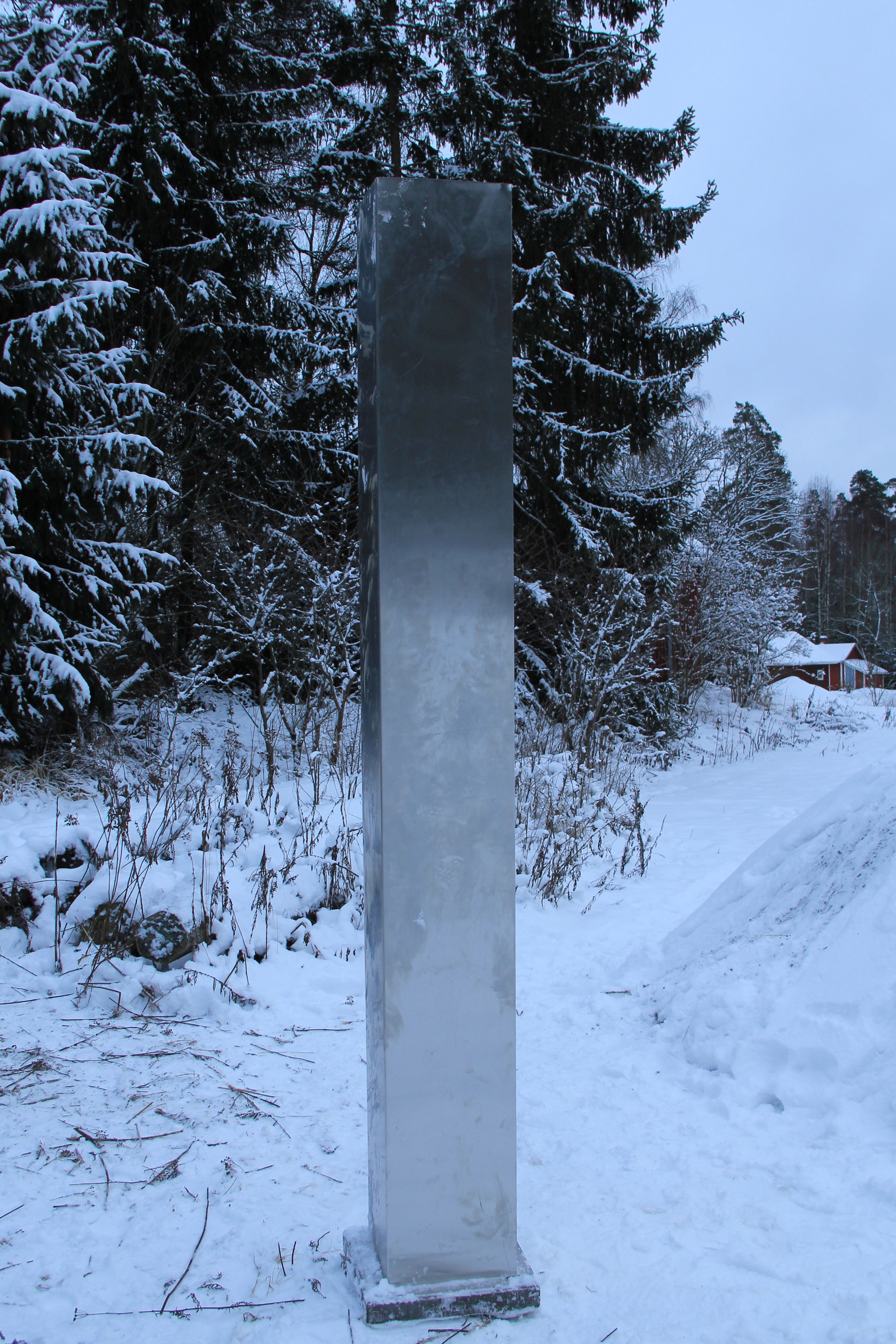
Monolith in Nurmijärvi, Finland

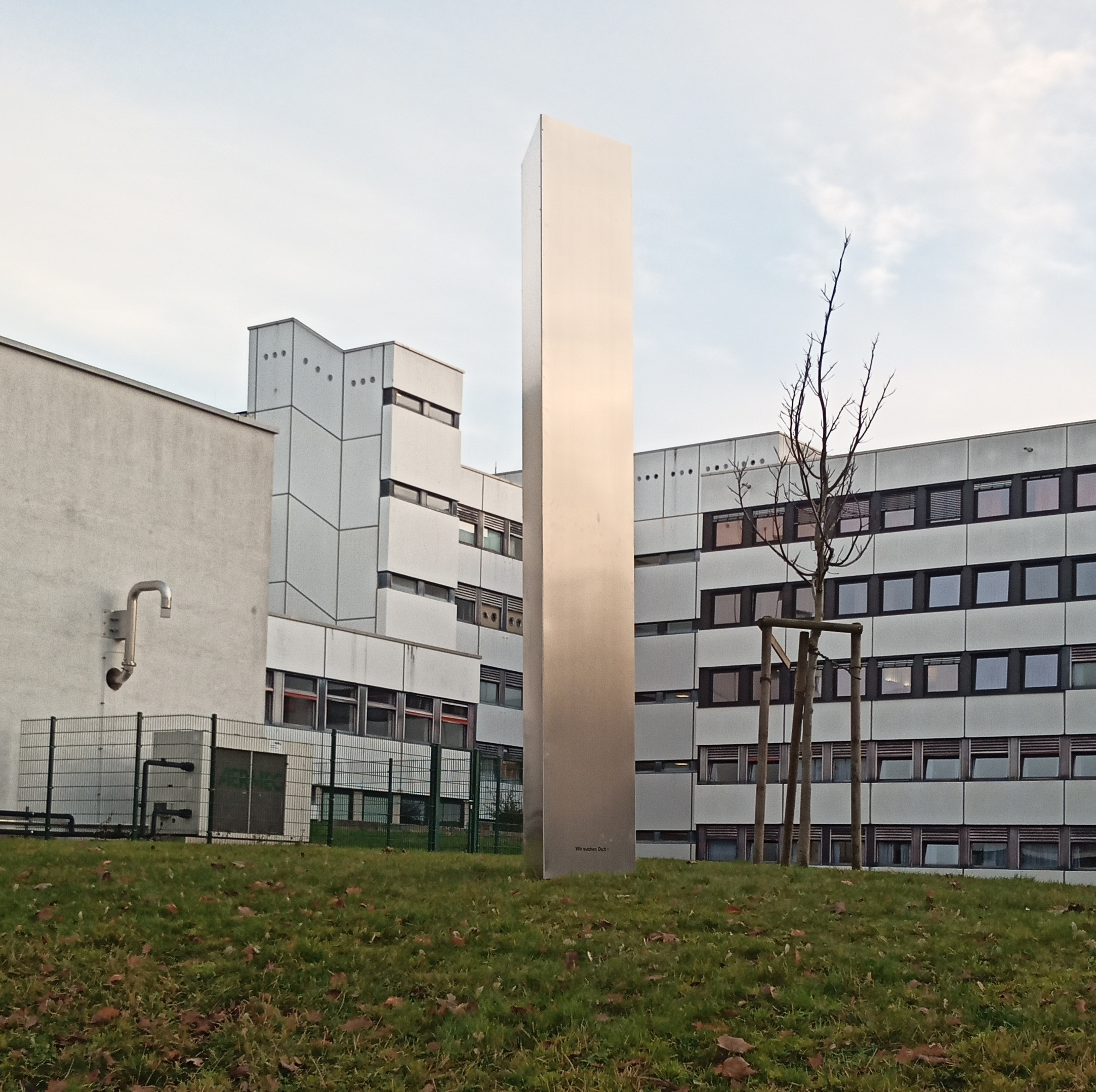
Monolith near Knappschaftskrankenhaus Lütgendortmund (Germany)

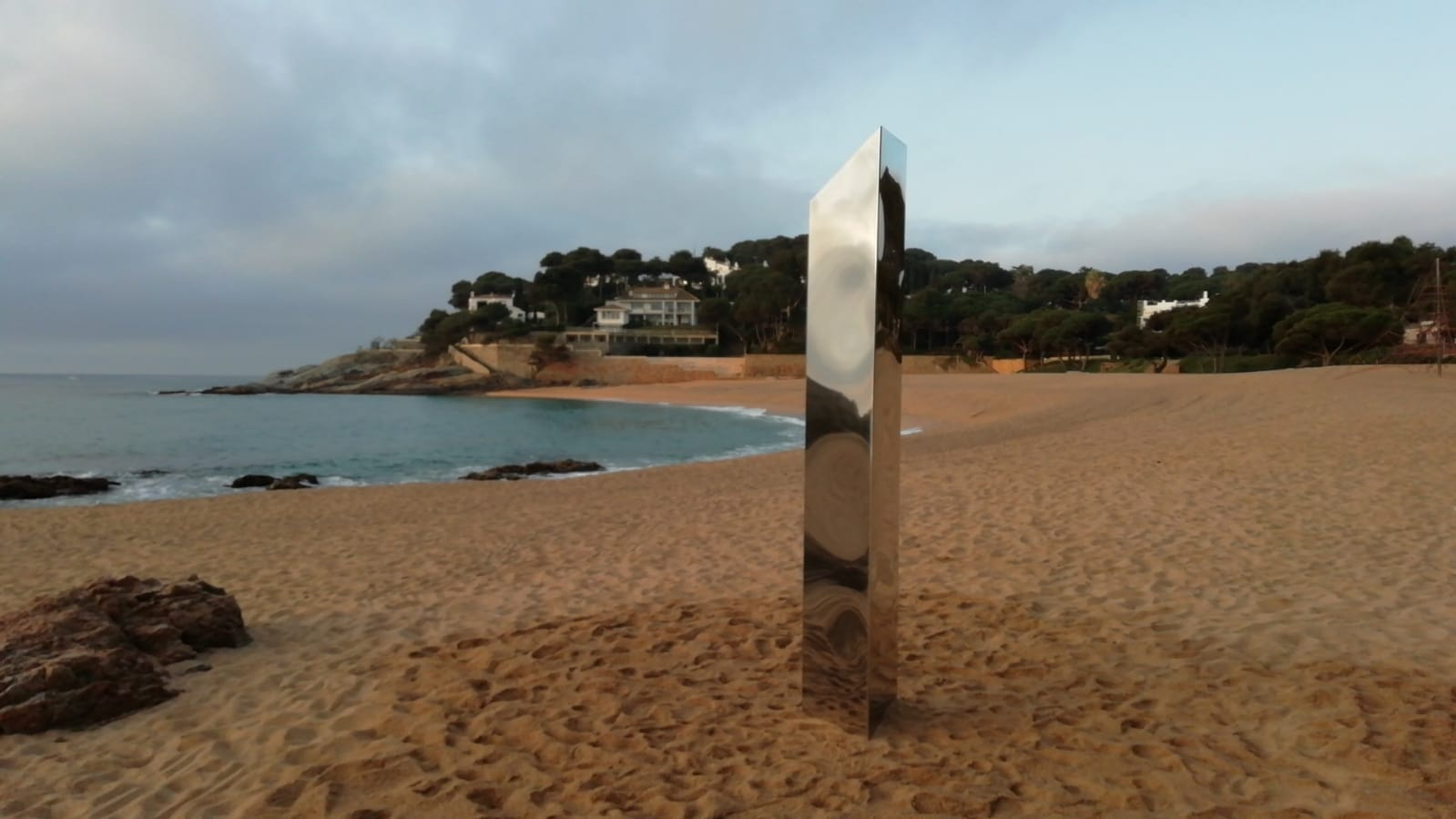
Monolith in Sa Conca (Castell-Platja d'Aro)

== See also ==
- Memetics
- Minimalism (visual arts)
- Pop art
- Seattle Monolith – Artwork installed in Seattle on New Year's Day 2001
- Site-specific art
- Trail ethics
