= Schaber =

Schaber is a surname. Notable people with the surname include:

- Caleb Schaber (1973–2009), American artist and journalist
- Penny Bernard Schaber, Democratic Party member of the Wisconsin State Assembly, elected in 2008

== See also ==
- 3333 Schaber, asteroid
- Wayne Schaab
