= Petr Janda =

Petr Janda may refer to:

- Petr Janda (architect) (born 1975), Czech architect
- Petr Janda (footballer) (born 1987), Czech footballer
- Petr Janda (musician) (born 1942), Czech musician
