= Utah monolith =

Metal pillar in Utah, US

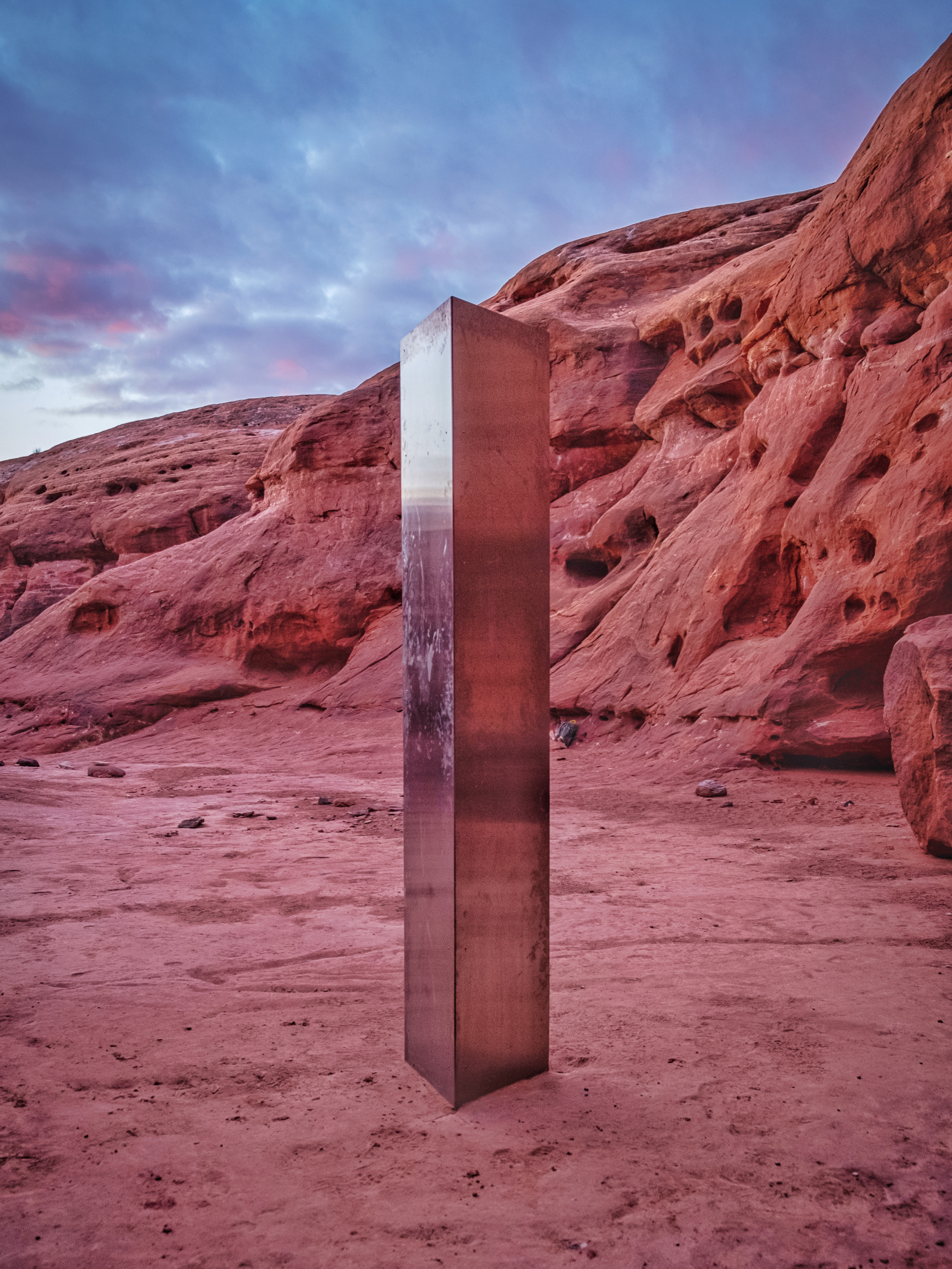
- The monolith at its original location
- Location where the monolith was found
- Artist: Unknown
- Year: 2016
- Type: Metal sculpture
- Medium: stainless steel or aluminum (assumed)
- Dimensions: 9.5 ft × 1.67 ft × 1.92 ft (2.9 m × 0.51 m × 0.59 m)
- Condition: disassembled
- Location: formerly Lockhart Basin in San Juan County, Utah, United States; 17 mi (27 km) southwest of Moab; 38°20′35.1″N 109°39′58.3″W

The Utah monolith was a metal pillar that stood in a slot canyon in northern San Juan County, Utah, United States. The pillar was 9.5 ft (2.9 m) tall and made of metal sheets riveted into a triangular prism. It was unlawfully placed on public land between July and October 2016, where it stood unnoticed for over four years until its discovery and removal in late 2020. The identity of its creators and their objectives remain unknown as of 2026.

Officials with the Utah Division of Wildlife Resources discovered the monolith in November 2020 during a helicopter survey of wild bighorn sheep. Within days of its discovery, members of the public located the pillar using GPS mapping software; many visitors then traveled to the remote location, causing damage to the local environment. Following intense media coverage, the monolith was covertly removed on November 27, 2020, by four residents of Moab, Utah, including athlete Andy Lewis. After nearly a month in their possession, Lewis gave the monolith to the Bureau of Land Management.

Following the discovery of the monolith, over two hundred similar metal columns were erected throughout the world, including elsewhere in North America and in countries in Europe and Australia. Many were built by local artists as deliberate imitations of the Utah monolith.

== Discovery ==
On November 18, 2020, wildlife officials with the Utah Division of Wildlife Resources were in San Juan County, Utah, conducting a survey of bighorn sheep from a helicopter piloted by the Utah Department of Public Safety (DPS). While flying over a slot canyon in a remote area, one of the wildlife officials spotted a metal pillar and asked the pilot, Bret Hutchings, to fly over the location again. Hutchings described the moment to a local news channel:

One of the biologists is the one who spotted it and we just happened to fly directly over the top of it. He was like, "Whoa, whoa, whoa, turn around, turn around!" And I was like, "What?" And he's like, "There's this thing back there – we've got to go look at it!"

Hutchings said that the pillar appeared to be man-made and had been "firmly planted in the ground". He described it as "about the strangest thing that I've come across out there in all my years of flying", and added: "We were kind of joking around that if one of us suddenly disappears, then the rest of us make a run for it."

On November 20, the Utah DPS posted a photo of the pillar on Instagram. On November 23, the Utah DPS released videos of the pillar on their website but did not disclose the pillar's location, citing safety concerns.

== Location and dating ==
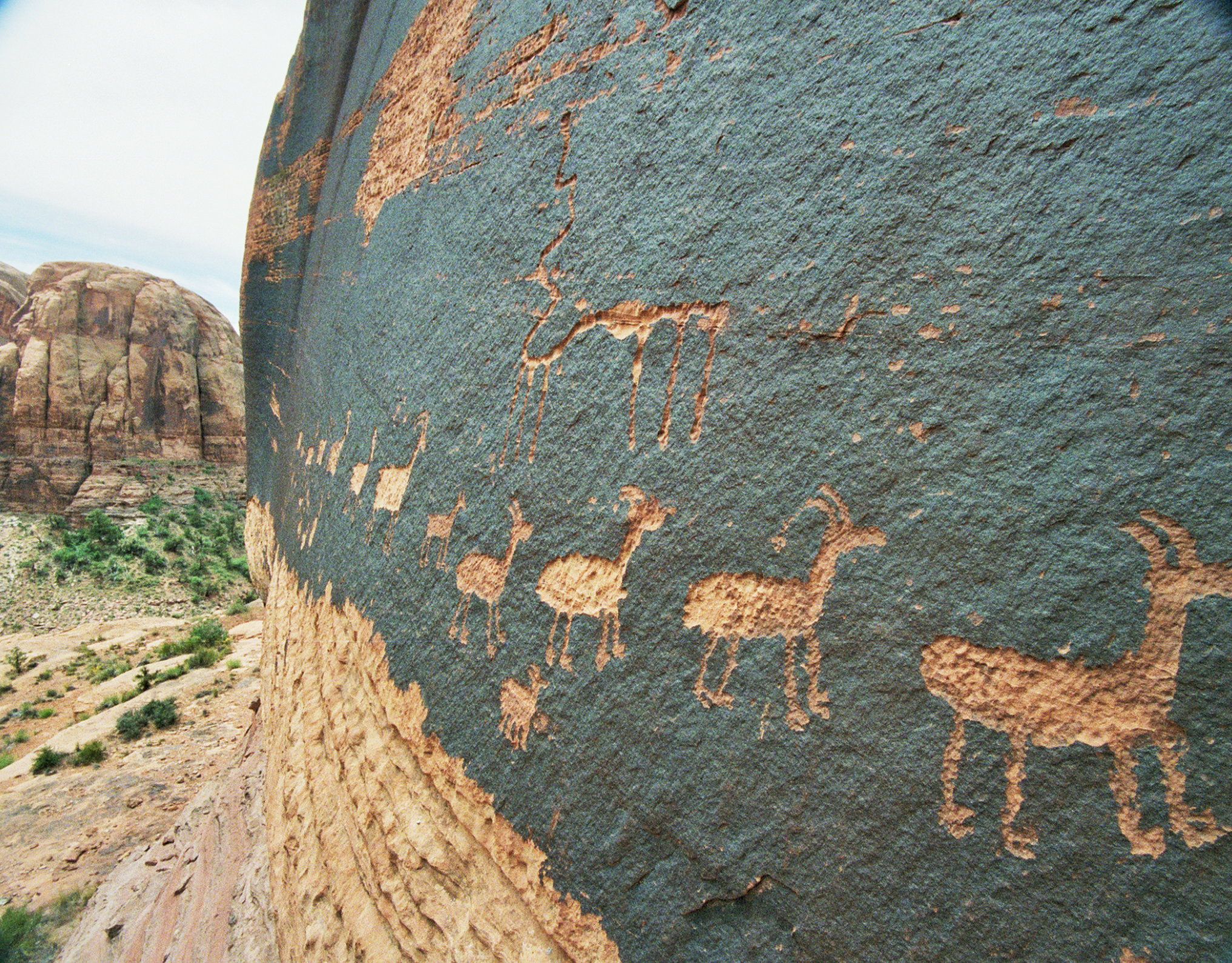
Petroglyphs of bighorn sheep near Moab, Utah

The pillar was installed by unknown individuals on public land in an area known as Lockhart Basin, which became part of Bears Ears National Monument shortly after its installation. (Note: Bears Ears National Monument was established on December 28, 2016. Lockhart Basin was part of the protected area until the monument's size was reduced in 2017. The area was added back to the monument in 2021.) The site has no public services such as parking, restrooms, or cell phone service.

The exact location of the monolith was not disclosed by the Utah DPS to prevent people from endangering themselves while trying to find it. Within a day of the Utah DPS announcement, Reddit user Tim Slane identified the object on Google Earth by tracking the flight path of the helicopter and comparing it with the videos the Utah DPS released. Slane told The Verge that "he was aided by clues like the cliffs' height, the canyon's erosion pattern (indicating a more exposed area), and a flat floor suggesting it wasn't frequently flooded (and, by extension, was near the top of a watershed)". Maxar satellite images suggest that the monolith appeared between July 7, 2016, and October 21, 2016, and Google Earth satellite images show that surrounding scrub vegetation had been cleared.

Within 48 hours of the Utah DPS announcement, members of the public had reached the site and uploaded photographs and videos of the monolith to social media.

== Description ==
The metal structure was a triangular prism with three sides that stood approximately 9.5 ft (2.9 m) tall above the bedrock. The base of the monolith formed the shape of an equilateral triangle; the sides of the triangle measured approximately 1.9 ft (0.58 m) long, and its altitude around 1.67 ft (0.51 m). The structure was not magnetic and had a hollow interior. It appeared to be made of stainless steel or aluminum sheets 1/8 inch (3 mm) thick, joined together with blind rivets. There was silicone caulk or epoxy along the base, and one early visitor said that the metal produced a sound "like a cardboard box" when hit or knocked on.

Dave Sparks of the reality television series Diesel Brothers went to the monolith and described it in a video he posted on Instagram: "They got a concrete saw and they cut it into the red rock there. You can see right here on the bottom where they had a couple of over cuts with the saws." Wendy Wischer of the University of Utah's School of Fine Art said: "One person alone could not have done it so there is a group of people who have some knowledge of it somewhere. Most artists want some recognition for what they are doing but this seems to include a level of humor and mystery as part of the intention."

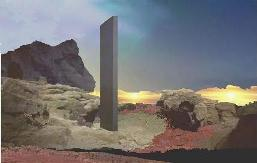
Painting by Georges Yatridès of a slab monolith, like the one that appears in the 1968 film 2001: A Space Odyssey

Upon first discovering the pillar, the Utah DPS described it as a "monolith", a term later repeated by other media outlets. Although the word monolith refers to a single great stone, the word has also become closely associated with the Monolith from the film 2001: A Space Odyssey (1968), to which the Utah monolith bears a general resemblance.

== Attribution ==
Several art critics and online users compared the object to works by artist John McCracken, who lived in the Southwest, believed in the existence of extraterrestrial life, and expressed an interest in leaving behind a piece of artwork in the desert. The object resembled the metallic monoliths McCracken made and was described as "nearly identical" to McCracken's Fair (2011) by New York gallerist David Zwirner (who displays the work). A spokesman for Zwirner later retracted this statement, telling The Guardian that it was likely created by another artist paying homage to McCracken. (Note: Despite the retraction, Zwirner later told The New York Times that he personally believed it was McCracken's work, and that the gallery was "divided" on the subject. Zwirner ultimately retracted this as well, writing to Vox that he no longer believed it was McCracken's work because McCracken preferred to create his sculptures by hand.)

Several online users suggested that the monolith was the work of Petecia Le Fawnhawk, who had installed sculptures in desert locations and lived in Utah, but she denied that it was her work. An artist collective known as "The Most Famous Artist" initially took credit for installing the monolith, but later admitted that the work was not theirs. The Utah Film Commission said that to their knowledge the monolith was not part of any film production.

As of March 2025, it remains unknown who installed the monolith. The New York Times said its unknown origin "provides a pleasant sensation of uncertainty" and that it might "lose its aura and power if we knew who had created it".

== Reactions ==
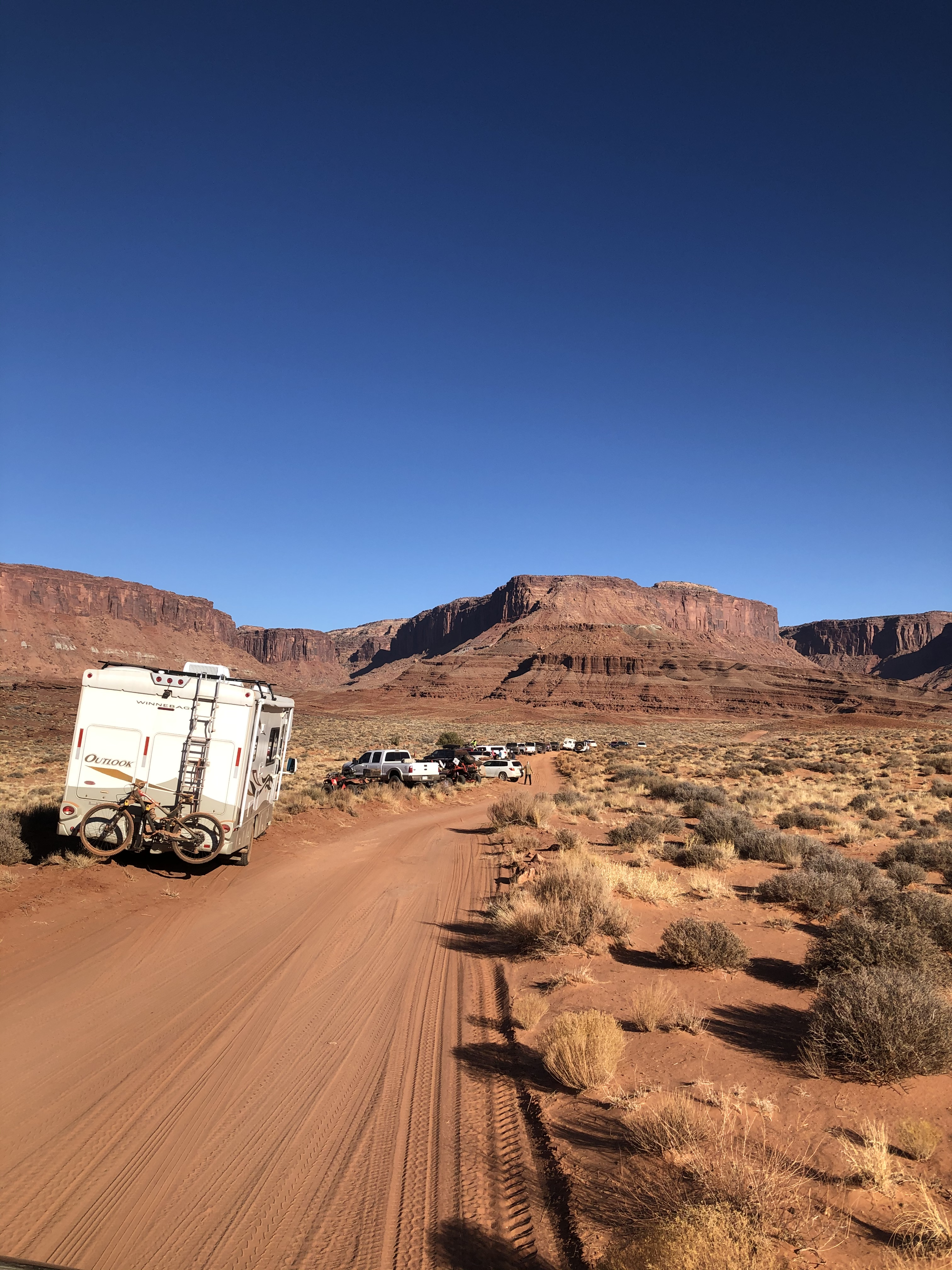
Photo captured by the Bureau of Land Management showing vehicles parked on shrubbery near the site

The monolith became the subject of international media attention following its discovery, leading to intense speculation online on its origins. Hundreds of people visited the remote site after its location was discovered. Local residents feared that a surge in foot traffic could damage local Native American sites and artifacts, including petroglyphs. The Bureau of Land Management (BLM), which manages the land, reported that tourists "left behind a mess of human waste, cars parked on vegetation and other debris" and warned that the site could not handle the sudden influx of visitors.

On November 23, 2020, the Bureau of Land Management issued a statement that it is illegal to install structures, including art, on public lands without permission "no matter what planet you're from". The Utah Department of Heritage & Arts expressed concern that the monolith's installation could have damaged archeological artifacts in the region, writing in a statement on Facebook: "[W]hile the monolith has better craftsmanship than graffiti, this is still vandalism. It irreversibly altered the natural environment on public lands."

== Removal ==
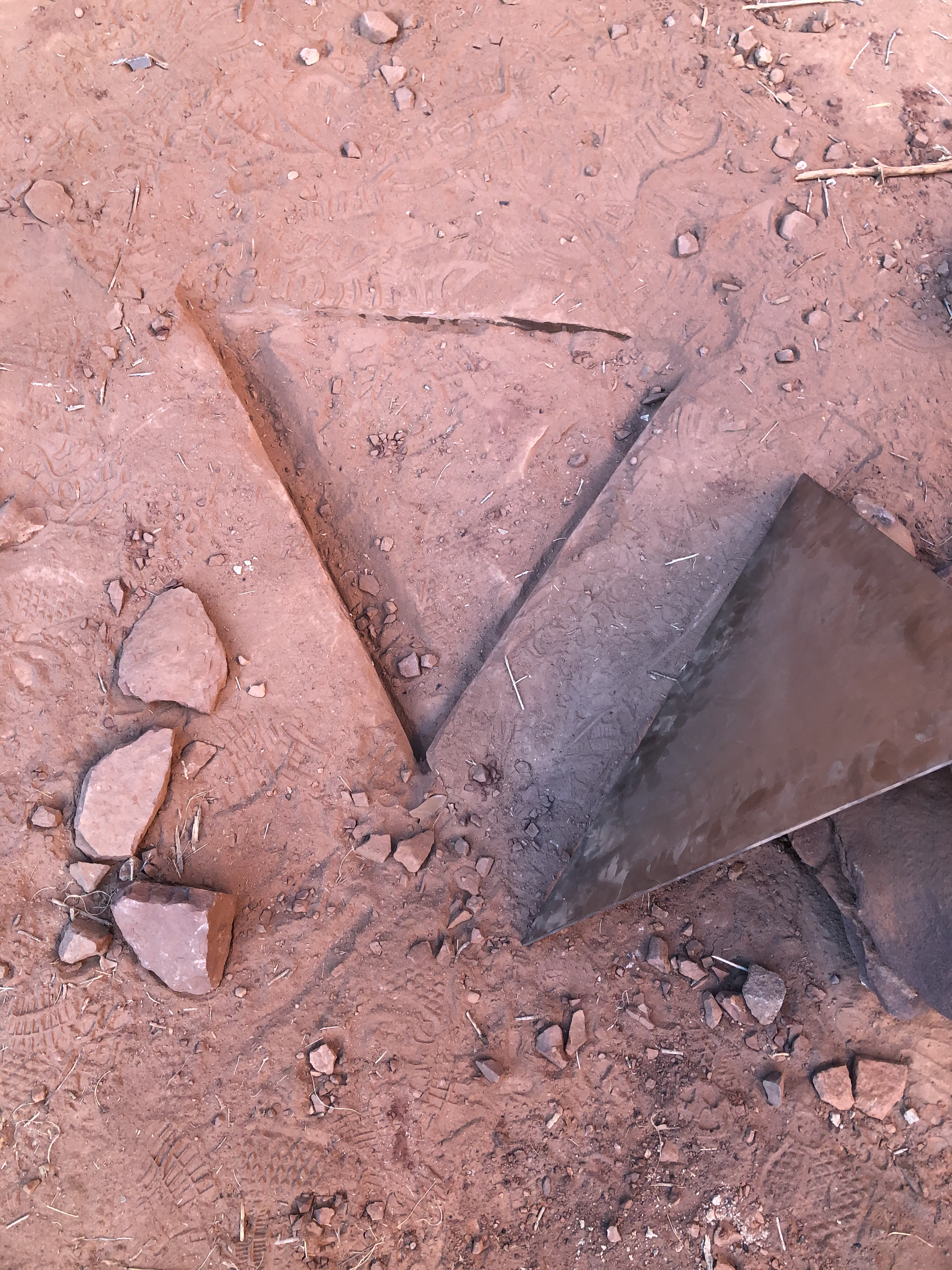
The site of the monolith one day after its removal

The monolith was removed on November 27, 2020, by professional slackliner Andy Lewis, his friends Sylvan Christensen and Homer Manson, and an anonymous fourth companion. Their identities were initially unknown, although several witnesses posted details and pictures online about the monolith's dismantling. One witness, photographer Ross Bernards, said that the group arrived at about 8:40 pm and immediately started pushing at the monolith while onlookers watched. Bernards said they were "throwing their whole body weight into it" and that "it took them maybe three big pushes" to topple it. After the monolith fell, members of the group said "this is why you don't leave trash in the desert" and "leave no trace" before breaking the structure apart and carrying the pieces away in a wheelbarrow. Bernards said that the group arrived and left within eight minutes. The triangular top piece of the monolith was left behind and later disappeared.

The BLM denied involvement in the monolith's removal, which it described as private property, and said that it would leave any further investigation to the local sheriff's office. On November 29, the local San Juan County Sheriff's Office said they could not devote the resources, although they did post a "Most Wanted" list with pictures of several aliens on their Facebook page. On November 30, authorities reversed their initial decision and announced a joint investigation with the BLM. Chief deputy Alan Freestone told The New York Times: "I know they have some leads, and that's all we are saying right now." Officials said they could not investigate the removal as stolen property because nobody had claimed the monolith as their property. (Note: Lewis suggested that the group might have faced charges of obstruction of justice because the monolith was considered part of an ongoing investigation.)

On December 1, Lewis uploaded a video on YouTube claiming responsibility for its removal. Christensen reposted the same video to TikTok and Instagram later that day, claiming that the group was motivated to remove the structure after seeing the environmental damage to the area from visitors and tourists. The group later claimed that they heard rumors online that people were planning to destroy it, so they removed it before anyone could. The group received hateful comments and threats as a result of their actions. Weeks later, Lewis posted a video on Instagram showing the monolith reassembled in his backyard. Lewis gave the structure to the BLM on December 18, and hoped that once the investigation was over a new home could be found for it. (Note: The San Juan County Sheriff's Office released a joint statement with the BLM on December 21 declining to confirm whether they had received it. As of June 2024, no updates were given on the monolith's current whereabouts.)

== Similar monoliths ==
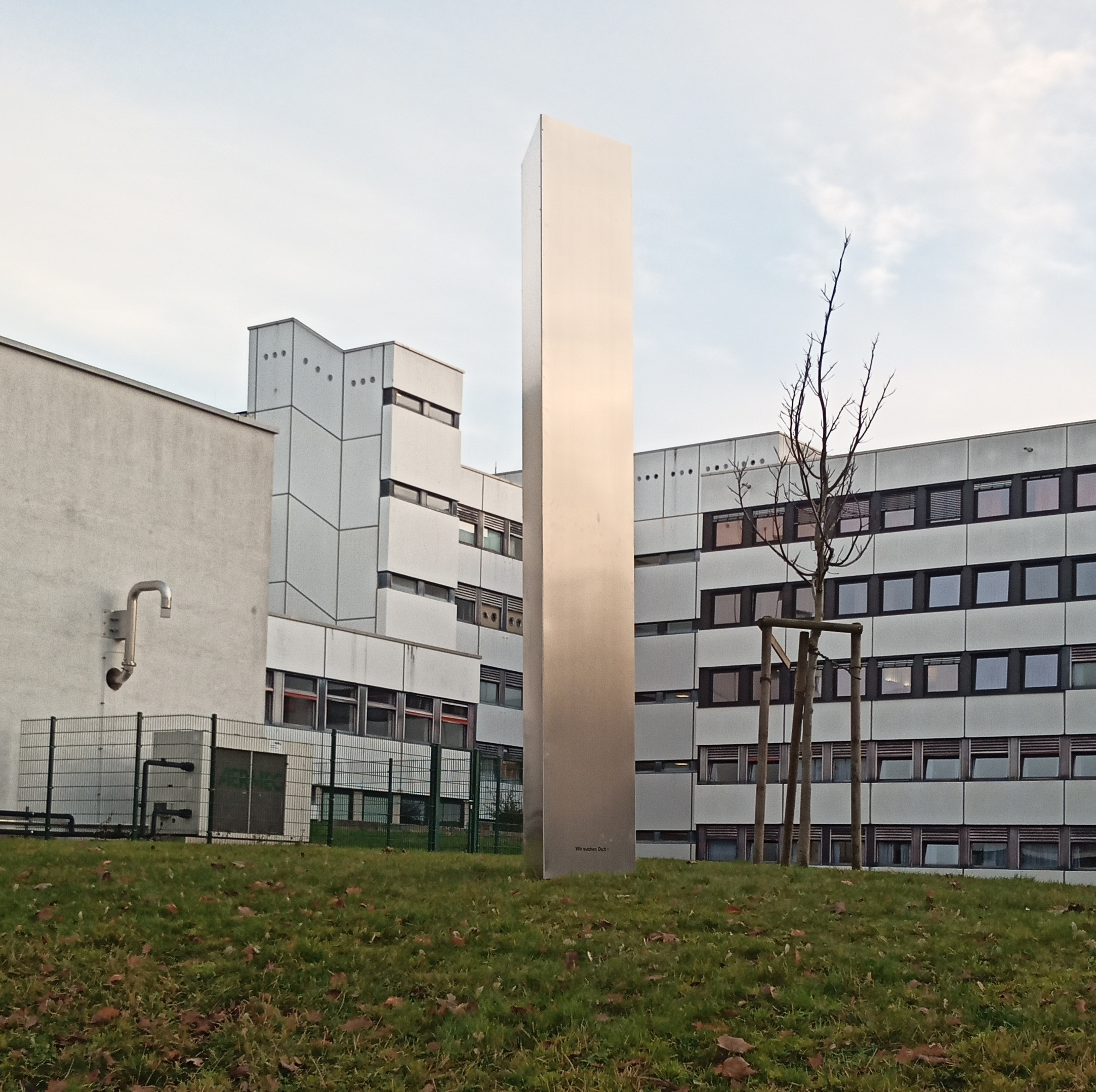
Similar monolith in Dortmund, Germany

Shortly after the discovery of the monolith in Utah, other structures which resembled it began appearing at various locations across the world, including elsewhere in North America and in various countries in Europe and Australia. CNN called it the "viral art moment" of the year, and Vox compared the monoliths to a "living meme". In some cases, local artists came forward to claim responsibility for them, citing the Utah monolith as their inspiration. Other monoliths were created and installed by small businesses for promotional purposes. As of June 2024, at least 245 similar structures had appeared across the world.

== See also ==
- Minimalism (visual arts) – Visual arts movement
- Seattle Monolith – Artwork installed in Seattle on New Year's Day 2001
- Georgia Guidestones – Former granite monument in Georgia, US
- Site-specific art – Artwork created for a certain place
- Trail ethics – Socially acceptable behaviors on recreational trails
