= Utah Division of Wildlife Resources =

Agency of the Utah state government, United States

Agency overview
- Headquarters: Salt Lake City, Utah; United States
- Parent agency: Utah Department of Natural Resources
- Website: wildlife.utah.gov

The Utah Division of Wildlife Resources (UDWR) is part of the Utah Department of Natural Resources for the state of Utah in the United States. The mission of the Division of Wildlife Resources is to serve the people of Utah as trustee and guardian of the state's wildlife. In addition to managing and protecting Utah's wildlife, UDWR manages hunting and fishing opportunities within the state.

== Regions and operations ==
The division operates five regions headquartered in Ogden (Northern Region), Vernal (Northeastern Region), Springville (Central Region), Price (Southeastern Region), and Cedar City (Southern Region). The division operates two hunter safety centers Salt Lake City (Lee Kay Shooting Center) and in Logan (Cache Valley Shooting Range). The division is also responsible for Hardware Ranch near Hyrum, The Eccles Wildlife Education Center in Farmington, the Fisheries Experiment Station in Logan, and the Great Basin Research Center in Ephraim.

=== Fish Hatcheries ===
The division maintains eleven production hatcheries, a research facility and a warmwater hatchery to stock Utah's streams, rivers, lakes and reservoirs with sportfish. Hatcheries are located throughout the state.

- J. Perry Egan Hatchery
- Fisheries Experiment Station
- Fountain Green Hatchery
- Glenwood Hatchery
- Kamas Hatchery
- Lee Kay Fish Hatchery
- Loa Hatchery
- Mammoth Creek Hatchery
- Mantua Hatchery
- Midway Hatchery
- Springville Hatchery
- Wahweap Warmwater Hatchery
- Whiterocks Hatchery

== Events ==
In November 2020, state biologists with the division found a metal monolith in San Juan County.
