= Petr Janda (architect) =

Czech architect (born 1975)

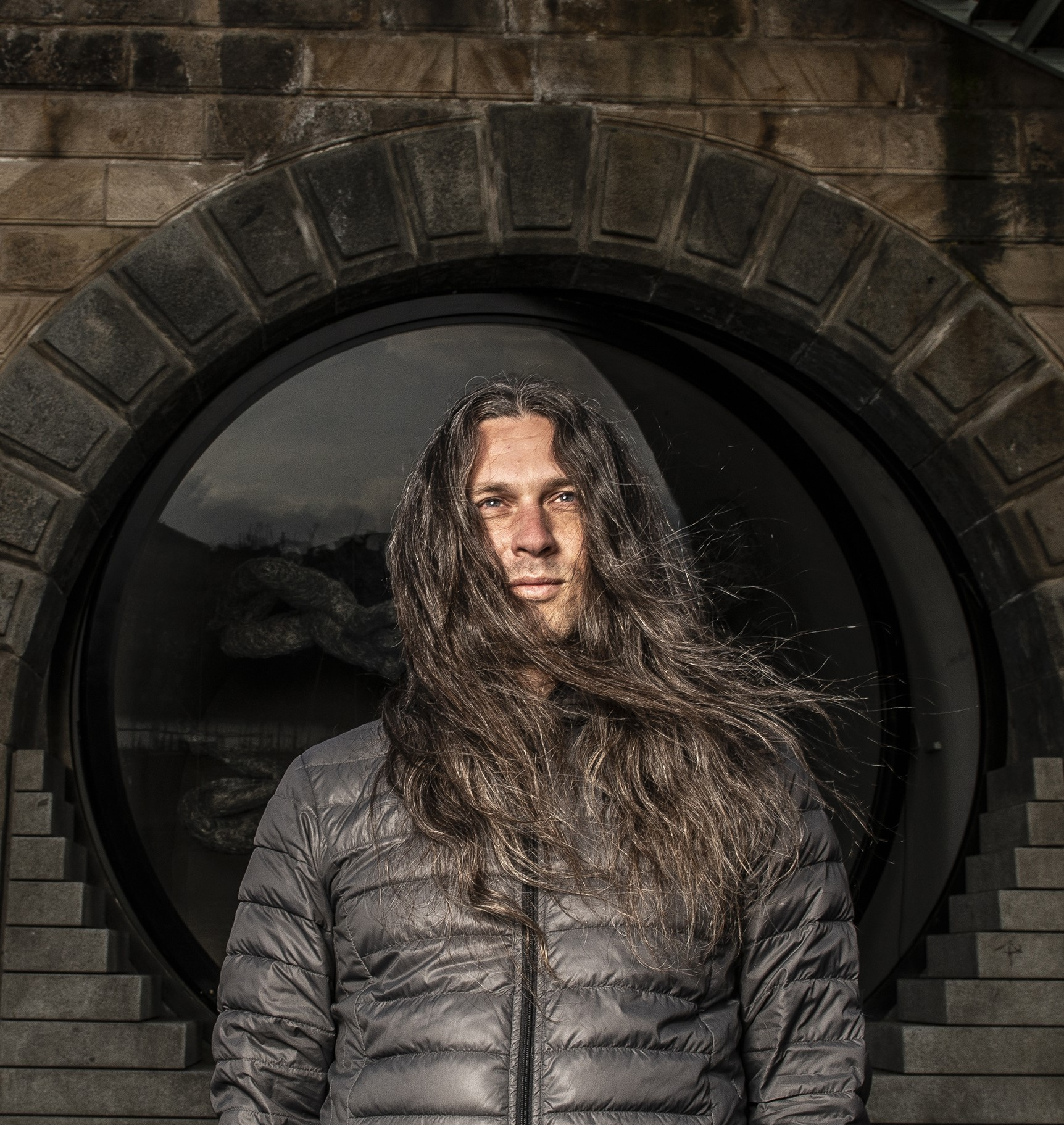
- Born: 5 January 1975 (age 51); Gottwaldow, Czechoslovakia
- Occupation: Architect
- Awards: BigMat International Architecture Award, National Prize (2013)

Petr Janda (born 5 January 1975) is a Czech architect. He studied at the Czech Technical University in Prague (1993–2001) and is also a graduate of the Monumental Art Studio of Professor Aleš Veselý at the Academy of Fine Arts (1997–2003).

He started to work with A 69 Architects, later he was one of the founding members of sporadical [sic?] art studio. Since March 2008 he has run his own brainwork art studio. In 2011 he became a member of the board of the Czech Chamber of Architects.

In 2020 and 2021, Petr Janda was nominated for the Architect of the Year Award in the Czech Republic.

== Works ==
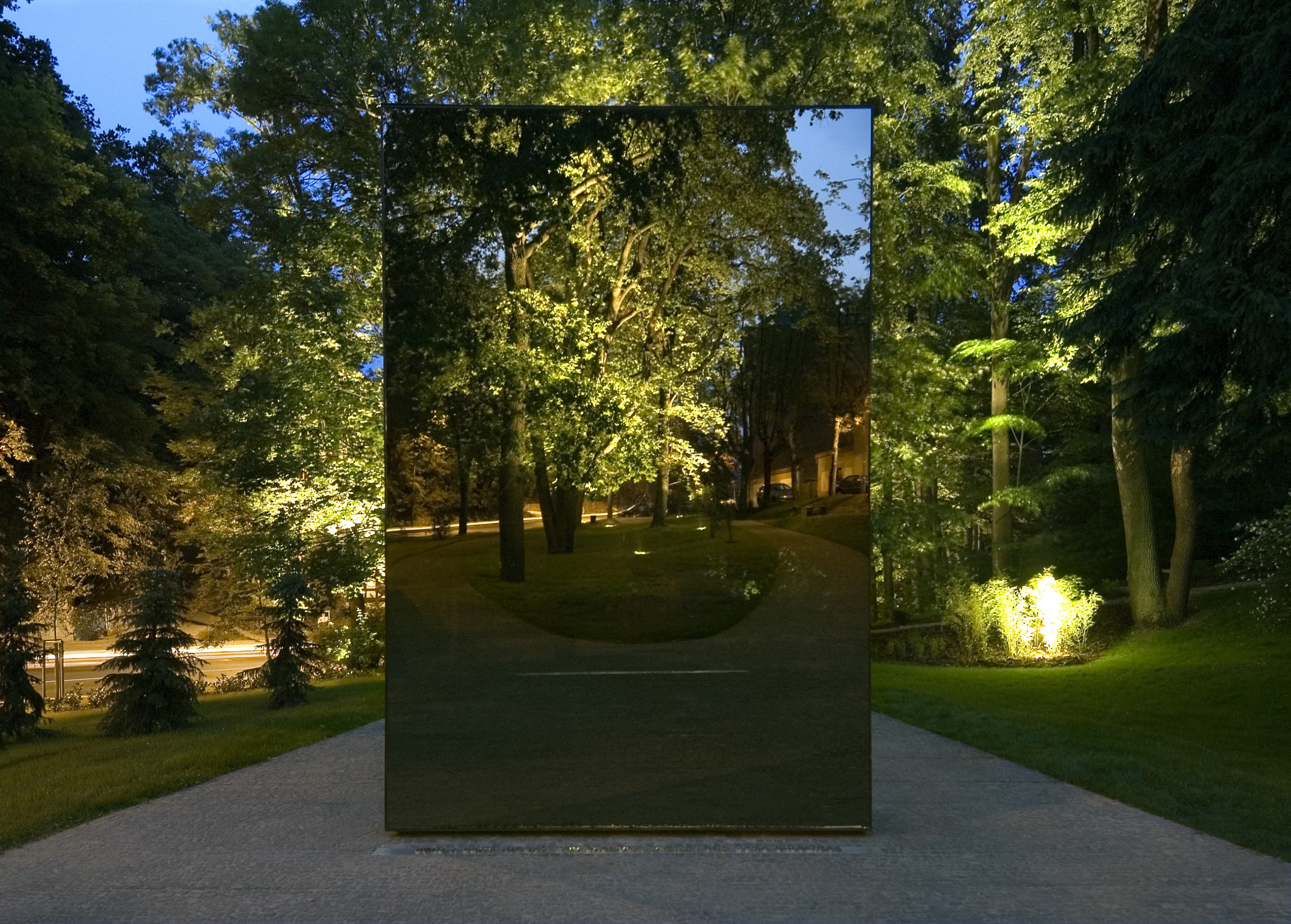
Memorial to the victims of communism, Liberec

- Memorial to the floods, Otrokovice (1998)
- Memorial to the victims of communism, Liberec (2006)
- Lazyhouse, Zlín (2007–2020)
- Flowhouse, Tečovice (2008–)
- Golf Academy Olomouc (2010–)
- (A)VOID Floating – floating pavilion, Prague (2011–)
- Revitalization of Prague riverfront area (2009–2019)

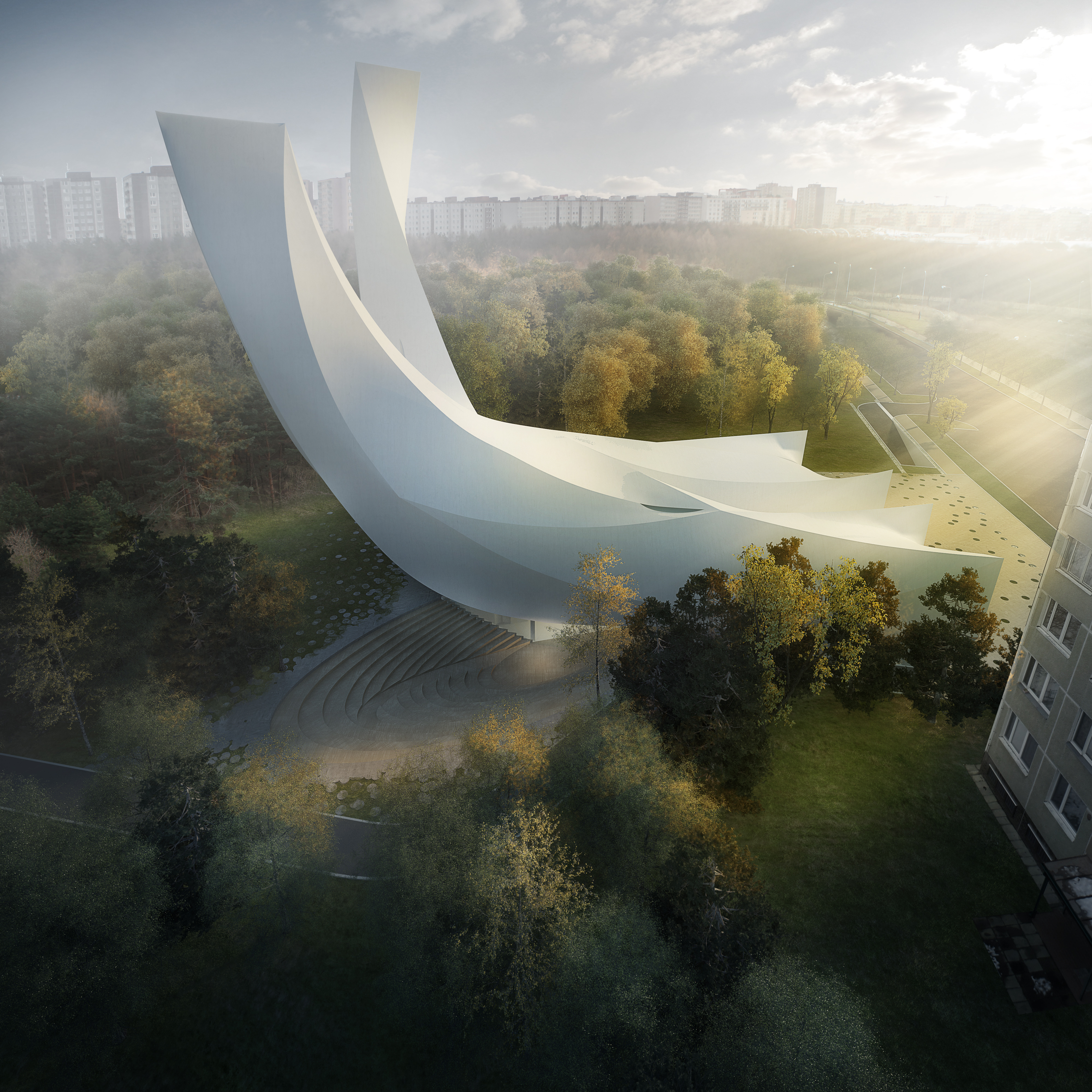
Proposal of the Church of Christ the Redeemer in Prague

== Awards ==
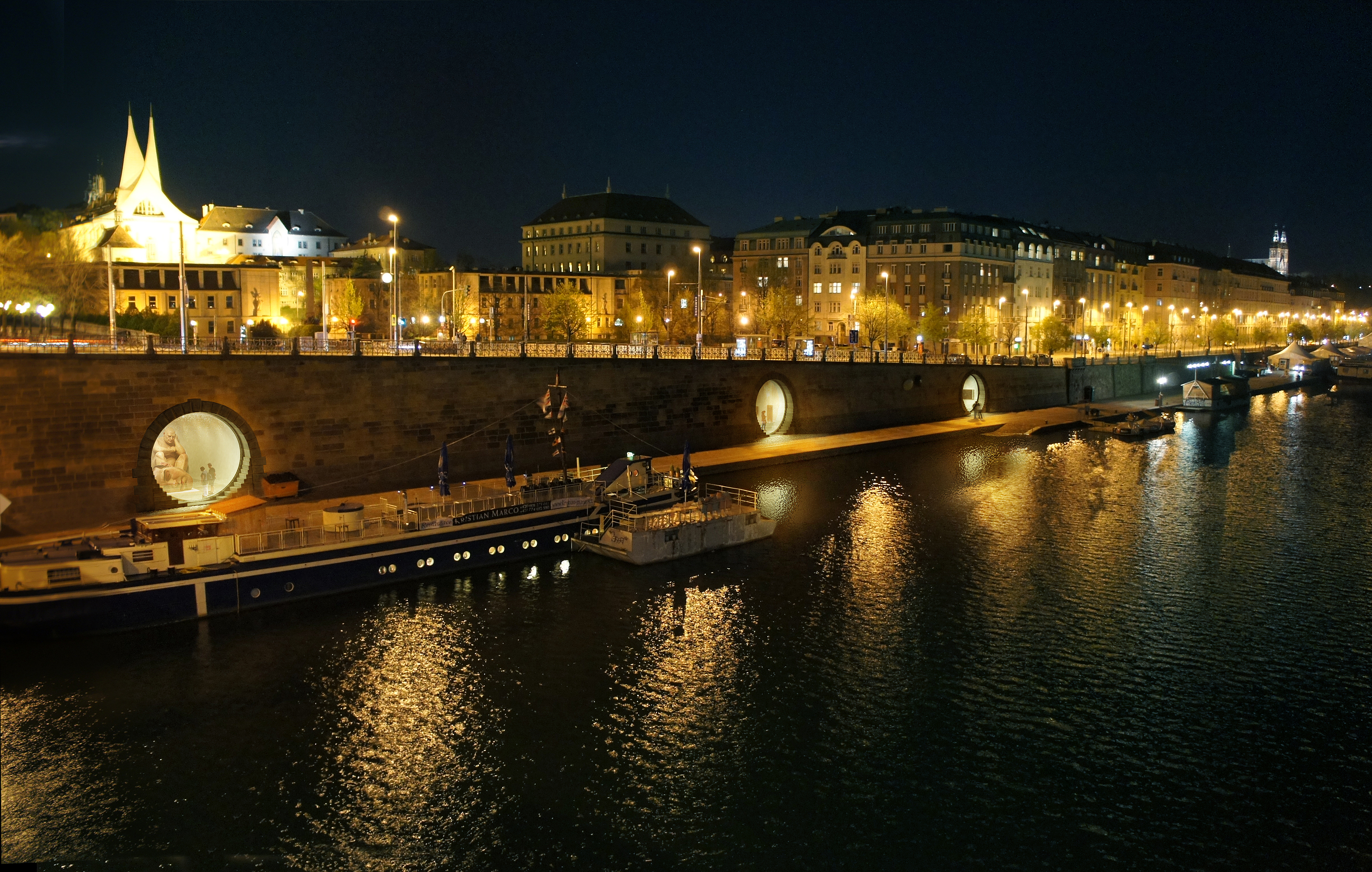
Prague's riverfront

Awards for the Revitalization of Prague riverfront area:

- Architecture Master Prize 2020 – Best of the best, Restoration and renovation
- BigSEE Architecture Award 2020 – Grand prix, Public and commercial Architecture
- Grand Prix architektů 2020 – Czech National Prize for Architecture
- Building of the year 2020 – The prize of the mayor of Prague
- German Design Awards 2021 – Special Mention
- Iconic Award 2020 – Best of the best
- Archdaily Award 2020 - finalist
- Architizer A+Award 2021 - Special mention
- BigMat Award 2021 - National Prize
- Dezeen Award 2021 – finalist
- Mies van der Rohe Award 2022 – nomination of the Czech Republic
- Piranesi Award 2021 – finalist
- Floating pool for Prague's riverfront
  - Architizer A+Award 2021 – winner of Sports & recreation category, unbuilt project
  - European Property Awards 2021
- 2021 European Property Awards – winner of Architecture Single Residence Category, Czech Republic - Lazyhouse, Zlín, Czech republic
- 2020 Winner of the call for the design of Flamingo visitor center in Abu Dhabi
- 2013 National Prize BigMat 2013 (BigMat '13 International Architecture Award) – Memorial to the victims of communism, Liberec
- 2013 – 2nd–3rd Prize – Roman Catholic Church of Christ the Redeemer, Prague
- 2009 – 1st Prize Aboard city 2 Botel, Smíchov, Prague
- 2007 – 1st Prize Aboard city 1 Botel, Vyšehrad, Prague
- 2007 – National Architecture Award (Grand Prix architektů) - Memorial to the victims of communism, Liberec
- 2007 – 2nd Prize, Nikola Tesla Memorial, Prague
- 2000 – 3rd Prize, Memorial to the victims of the totalitarian regime, Prague
- 1999 – 2nd Prize, Jan Palach and Jan Zajíc Memorial, Wenceslas Square, Prague
