= Tribaldos =

Tribaldos, Spain
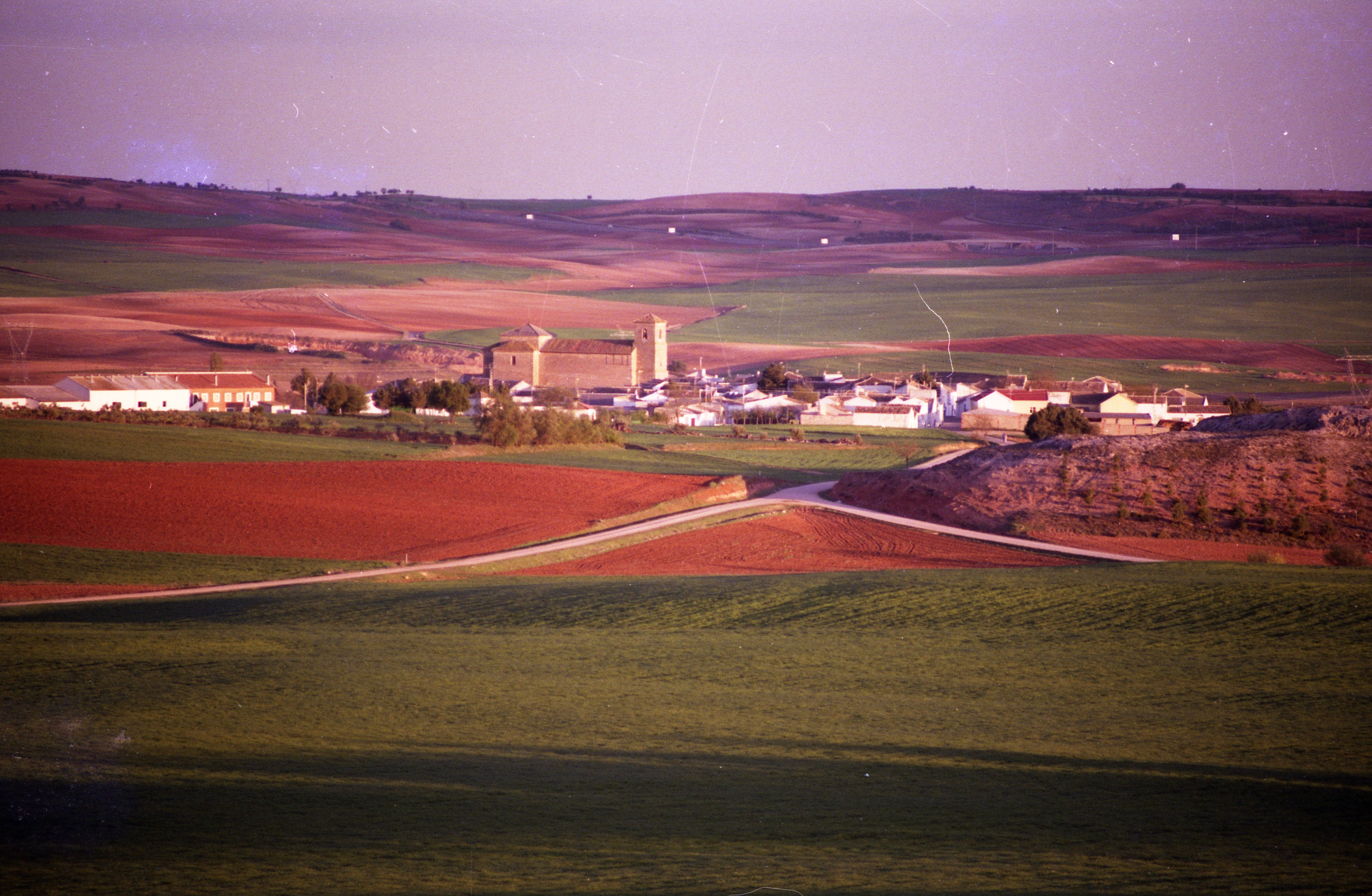
- View of Tribaldos from the hermitage of Santa Ana

- Coat of arms

- Location within Spain Location within Castilla-La Mancha
- Coordinates: 39°58′N 2°54′W
- Country: Spain
- Autonomous community: Castile-La Mancha
- Province: Cuenca
- Municipality: Tribaldos

Area
  - Total: 21 km^{2} (8.1 sq mi)

Population (2025-01-01)
  - Total: 101
  - Density: 4.8/km^{2} (12/sq mi)
- Time zone: UTC+1 (CET)
  - Summer (DST): UTC+2 (CEST)

Tribaldos is a municipality in Cuenca province, Castile-La Mancha, Spain. According to the 2004 census (INE), the municipality has a population of 129 residents.
