= Seattle Monolith =

Artwork installed in Seattle on New Year's Day 2001

- Artist: Unknown artist
- Year: 2001
- Type: Steel sculpture
- Dimensions: 30 cm × 120 cm × 270 cm (1 ft × 4 ft × 9 ft)
- Location: Seattle; 47°40′51″N 122°14′53″W
- Owner: "Some People"

On New Year's Day 2001, a replica of the Monolith from 2001: A Space Odyssey appeared on Kite Hill in Seattle's Magnuson Park. The Seattle Monolith was a guerrilla art installation by a group of Seattle artists calling themselves "Some People".

== Timeline ==
| Date | Event |
|---|---|
| December 30, 2000 | Foundation poured. |
| December 31, 2000 | Monolith erected. |
| January 3, 2001 | Monolith taken by unknown persons and moved to Duck Island in Seattle's Green Lake. |
| January 5, 2001 | A group calling themselves "Some People" come forth to claim the Monolith from Duck Island. The Monolith is stored under the Fremont Bridge while plans are made to install it semi-permanently in Magnuson Park. |
| January 16, 2001 | Monolith reinstalled in Magnuson Park. |
| March 2001 | Monolith removed from the Park in time for kite season and moved to a residence in Ravenna. |
| 2002 | Monolith moved to Bed Rock Foundry in the Interbay Area. |

== Construction ==
The Monolith was fabricated by Louie Raffloer at Seattle's Black Dog Forge. It was a hollow structure measuring 1 by 4 by 9 feet (0.30 m × 1.2 m × 2.7 m), the same proportions as the Monoliths of the "Space Odyssey" series. It was constructed of 16 gauge steel and L-beams. Rebar protruded from the bottom to attach the Monolith to its foundation. Estimates on the weight ranged from 350 to 500 lb (160 to 230 kg). The foundation, consisting of 4 steel tubes connected by rebar, was buried in the ground and embedded in concrete. When the Monolith was erected, quick set epoxy was poured into the tubes and the rebar on the bottom of the Monolith was inserted into the tubes.

== Funding ==
The overall cost for constructing the Monolith was approximately $250. The majority of the money for the Monolith was raised at the "Apes Of Wrath" Mexican Wrestling Party at Rocket Science Studios on Seattle's Westlake Avenue. Additional money was raised through the sale of "I Support the Monolith" T-shirts, an unsanctioned sidewalk bake sale on Broadway, a private screening of 2001: A Space Odyssey and a benefit concert held at The Speakeasy Café in Belltown.

== "Some People" ==
Initially, the artists creating the Monolith had the idea that the public would never know where the Monolith came from or who constructed it. That changed after the Monolith was removed from the park and found on Duck Island. Artist Caleb Schaber came forward as a spokesperson for Monolith announcing a group of artists named "Some People" were responsible for the art. Schaber later had a duplicate of the Monolith made for himself and in April, 2001, ran for Mayor of Seattle.

No other information was known about "Some People" until two years later when the Seattle Times ran an article about the Monolith's journey around the city. Chris Lodwig finally admitted to reporter Tyrone Beason that he, Titus Grupp and Eric Leuschner had the initial idea for the project and that about 50 other people were involved.

== See also ==
- Utah monolith – Metal pillar in Utah, US
