= Tech Open Air =

Technology festival

- Status: Active
- Genre: Technology Conference
- Locations: Berlin, Germany
- Inaugurated: 2012
- Attendance: 15,091 (2017)
- Organizer: Nikolas Woischnik
- Website: toa.berlin

Tech Open Air (often abbreviated as "TOA") is an annual interdisciplinary technology festival that takes place in Berlin, Germany. It started in 2012 as the very first tech festival organised through crowdfunding. The festival has developed into a well-known tech conference in and out of Europe. The main concept behind Tech Open Air is to bring together the areas of technology, music, art, and science by providing a platform for multi-disciplinary knowledge exchange, collaboration, and development. Tech Open Air is organised every year in June or July and gathers a number of influential speakers, entrepreneurs, artists, scientists, start-ups, and attendees from Germany and 55+ other countries.

== 2023 ==
After a three-year COVID-19 hiatus, the Tech Open Air Festival will occur again in Berlin on 5–7 July 2023.

== 2020 and later ==
Tech Open Air 2020 was cancelled due to the COVID-19 pandemic, though some virtual events occurred as well as TOA's launch of new digital products, like Klub, a cohort-based learning platform and TOA ON AIR, a podcast hosted by TOA Founder, Niko Woischnik.

== 2017 ==
The TOA17 Festival took place between the 11–14 July 2017, remaining for a second year at former GDR Radio Station, Funkhaus Berlin. 2017 saw the Satellites program extend even further with kick-off events (including the official Satellites launch party with Seth Troxler) taking place on the Tuesday before the Conference.

TOA Conference also expanded further with a brand new 4500qm exhibition hall "The House of Tech". This unique TOA style take on a traditional expo hosted brands such as Facebook, Google, Samsung NEXT, as well as a host of Europe's leading startups. Over 6,000 people attended the conference, where the 200+ speakers included Adam D'Angelo (Co-Founder & CEO, Quora), Richard Sharp (CTO, Shazam), Richie Hawtin, Mate Galic (CTO, Native Instruments), Erika Lust (Co-founder, Erika Lust Films), Hector Ouilhet (Head of Design, Google Search), Imogen Heap (Founder, Mycelia), and Yael Eisenstat (former CIA analyst and security advisor to Vice President Joe Biden).

2017 was also the inaugural year for TOA Music Fest which took place on the last night of the festival with over 2000 people in attendance. The night featured live performances from Machinedrum and Schwarz Don't Crack, as well as DJ sets from the likes of Blaenk Minds.

== 2016 ==
Tech Open Air held its fifth edition on 13–15 July 2016, with the conference taking place at a new venue, Funkhaus Nalepastraße, over the first two days. In 2016 the TOA satellite programme expanded to occur over the whole of 15 July as well as on the evenings of the conference. In total 177 satellite events took place in Berlin across three days.

The TOA conference hosted 166 speakers and included keynote talks from founders and entrepreneurs such as Yancey Strickler, Luis von Ahn and Cindy Gallop. In addition to the talks, attendees were able to take part in a number of different formats such as Pitch-nic, Music Meets Tech, and a Reverse Pitch where investors were able to pitch their investments to promising startups.

In total, 11,221 people attended TOA from over 40 countries. Speakers included Mathias Döpfner (Axel Springer), Catherina Fake (Flickr), Luke Woods (Facebook), Dominik Richter (HelloFresh), Katie Dill (Airbnb), Daniel Barenboim (Berlin State Opera), Gabriel Flateman (Casper) and Susan Danziger (Ziggeo).

== 2015 ==
Tech Open Air 2015 (#TOA15) took place on 15–17 July 2015. The "Unconference" as well as more than 150 satellite events across Berlin were the main components of the festival. The programme invited the event attendees to experience engaging talks presented by over 110 professionals, as well as interactive panels, art installations, live music, and networking opportunities. Satellite events provided an opportunity for Tech Open Air attendees to fully immerse themselves in the Berlin startup culture.

One additional format of the "Unconference" was a networking session called Back to the Future: Enterprise Meets Startup which inspired and encouraged cross-industry collaboration; the Pitch-Nic (a high-speed pitching session for start-ups and investors); and the Hardware Pitch where six hardware innovations pitched their ideas on stage.

The 2015 edition was attended by over 5000 people from various industries and nations (over 30 countries represented). Around 150 media outlets were involved in this year's event including the Wall Street Journal, BBC and TechCrunch. The list of speakers included Mike Butcher (TechCrunch), Chris Barton (Shazam), Christoph Keese (Axel Springer SE), Niklas Oestberg (Delivery Hero), Robert Gentz (Zalando), Greg Dybec (Elite Daily), Assaf Biderman (Superpedestrian), and Dirk Ahlborn (Hyperloop).

== 2014 ==
The third edition of Tech Open air took place in 2014 and included more than 100 speakers and more than 2750 attendees. The programme also included the first ever Design Slam in Berlin, start-up battles, collaborative workshops and live music. One of the hot topics discussed at the event was wearable technology.

== 2013 ==
The second edition of Tech Open Air included 85 speakers, more than 2000 attendees and 50 satellite events.

== 2012 ==
Tech Open Air's inaugural event took place in 2012 in Berlin. The first edition included nearly 60 speakers, 850 visitors and 23 satellite events.

== See also ==
- South by Southwest
