= Georges Yatridès =

French painter (1931–2019)

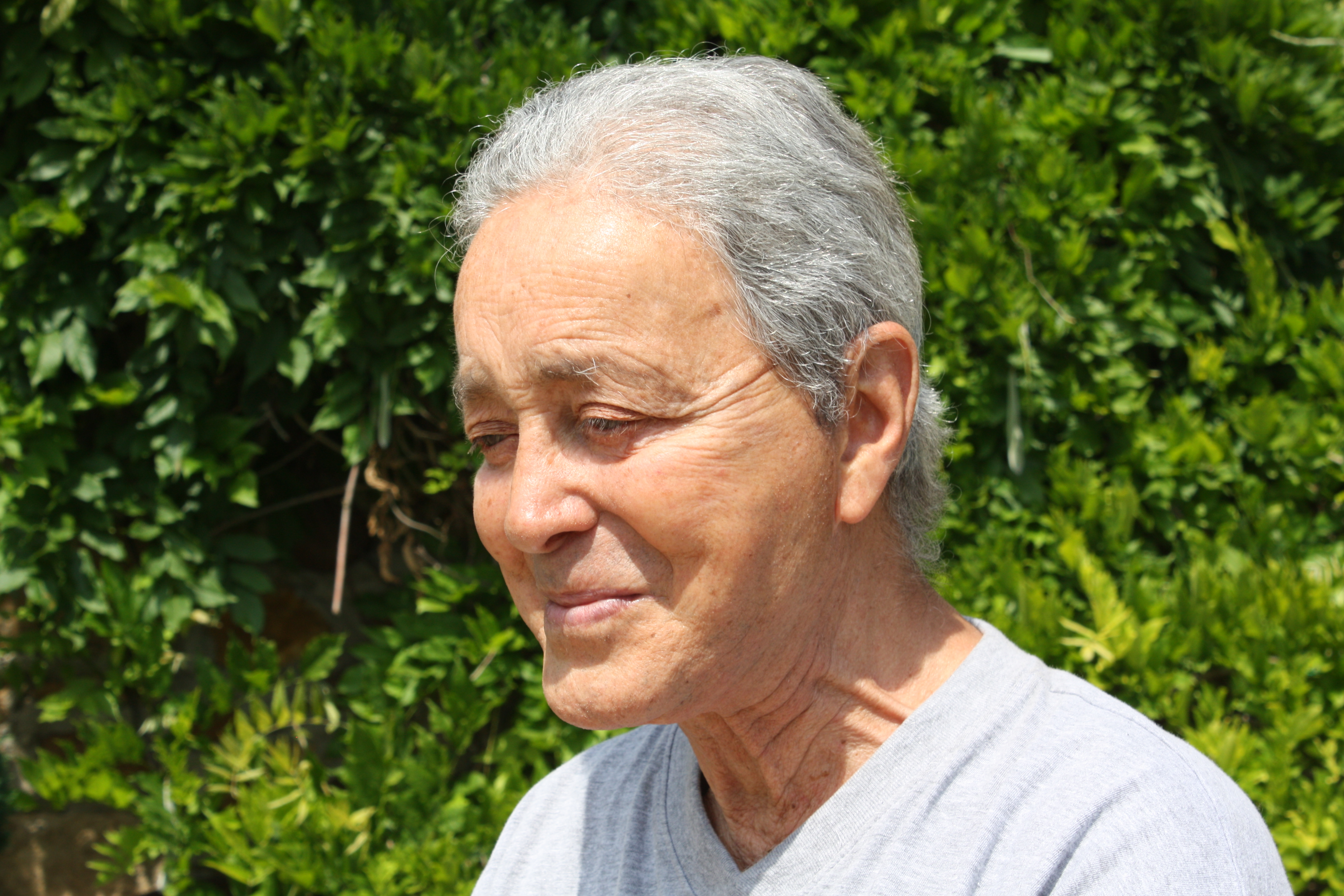
- Georges Yatridès in July 2010
- Born: March 5, 1931; Grenoble, France
- Died: 28 November 2019 (aged 88); Saint-Marcellin, Isère, France
- Known for: Painting
- Notable work: Slab monolith

Georges Yatridès (March 5, 1931 — November 28, 2019) was a French painter. His work is held in various North American private collections, and has been featured in retrospectives.

== Early years and personal life ==
Georges Yatridès was born in 1931 in Grenoble, France. His parents were Greek. During the dissolution of the Ottoman Empire, they moved to France in 1917. His father was of Greek heritage, born in the United States, and studied in France. His paternal grandfather was a Christian Orthodox Deacon who worked as a pastor in Rock Springs, Wyoming. His great-grandfather was a Christian Orthodox Archimandrite. (Note: There is a Greek Orthodox church, called the Holy Trinity Greek Orthodox Church, at 405 N. Street in Rock Springs, Wyoming.)

Over the course of his lifetime, he lived in France and the United States.

== Career ==
In 1954 he exhibited paintings produced from 1945 to 1949 in Vichy. In 1956, his work was shown in Paris at Madame Chastenet de Gery's Gallerie des Voyelles. A representative of the International Galleries of Chicago was contracted to purchase Yatridès's works, which were sold to private collectors in Canada and the United States. Two works sold through the Chicago firm were Daybreak in Port and Landscape, both made in 1960.

From 1957 to 1965, he held solo exhibitions in the United States, Canada, Latin America, Switzerland, Great Britain and Greece, where his works were acquired by private collections and a museum. One solo exhibit was at the Contemporary French Masters in Chicago in 1959.

Yatridès was described by writer Vanessa Fize as "a great contemporary painter, driven by his passion for light and science". His work had elements of graphic art in the 1960s. The following decade he studied in Grenoble at the Commissariat à l'énergie atomique et aux énergies alternatives (CEA) to research light and color. As his career progressed he explored use of different media and materials.

Yatridès made the large compositions that would characterize his art in the 1970s. In 1981, he exhibited paintings inspired by the Bible in three crypts in the Sacré-Cœur in Paris.

Events from the 1980s include:

- XIth and XIIIth Salons in Montmorency, Val d'Oise département, 1981 and 1983 in France.
- XXXIIIth Salon, 1988 in Montargis.
- French and Canadian International Biennials, 1987–1988.
- Canada-France International biennials, 1988 in Québec.
- Canada-France Biennials, 1991–1993.

On 17 January 1996, "Yatrides et son siècle" council was established to protect the public, civil and professional interests of Yatridès's works. The organization is composed of "senior officials" (tax administration director, police security officers, doctors).

Yatrides died on November 28, 2019, in Saint-Marcellin, Isère, France.

== Comparison to Kubrick ==
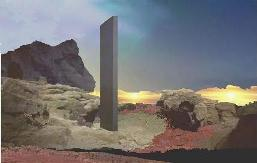
Slab monolith, like the first sequence of 2001: A Space Odyssey

Art critics have suggested there are similarities between the monolith in Stanley Kubrick's 1968 film 2001: A Space Odyssey and a recurring monolith motif in the artwork of Yatridès. Arthur Conte suggests that Yatridès' Adolescent and Child canvas painted in 1963 has a slab similar to that of Kubrick. (Note: Arthur Conte, the author of Yatrides, Maitre du temps, was a broadcasting executive, journalist and politician, including Secretary of State for Industry and Commerce and Director-General for Office de Radiodiffusion Télévision Française.) Sacha Bourmeyster, a semiology specialist, states that the Yatridès slab communicates supernatural life in a manner similar to that in 2001. Similarities between Yatridès' art and Kubrick's monolith have also been noted on CyberArchi, an on-line French architecture magazine.

== Works ==
Selected works of Yatridès are:

- Payage Anime aux Cypres, 40.5x33cm, 1947.
- Glass composition and dishes, 60 x 74 cm, 1955.
- Composition around a Shaddock, 28.25x20", 1958. Provenance: Johnson Galleries, Chicago.
- Untitled work, 21.5x29", 1958. First owned private Collection, New York.
- Still Life with Mask, 15x24", 1959.
- Untitled work, 21.5x29" 1959. First owned private Collection, New York.
- Daybreak in Port, 16.5x19", 1960. First sold by International Galleries, Chicago to a private estate.
- Landscape, 35.75 x 23", by 1960. First sold by International Galleries, Chicago to a private estate.
- Two Nudes, 1960.
- Still-Life with Fish Bowl, 20x28", 1961.
- Silent Worlds, 32 x 23.75", 1962. Provenance International Galleries, Chicago.
- Christ, Leica and orange, 92x73cm, 1963.
- Two people on the beach, 100x63cm, 1963.
- Le Mur, 24x20", 1964.
- House in Villars-de-Laus, 18 x 25 1/2", 1965.
- Pitcher and Glass, 28.75 x 19.75", 1965.
- Still Life in Two Bunches, 36.25x28.75", 1965.
- Yellow Roses, 36x23.5", 1965.
- Ezekiel, 89x116cm, 1978.
- Essential vibration, 97x130cm, 1982.
- The spiral pillar of time, 65x92cm, 1982.
- Bowman embryogenetic resurrection, date unknown.

== Gallery ==
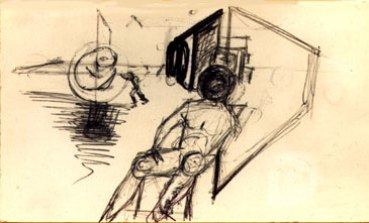
Compilation purpose: Eternity (study), 24x31cm, November 1957

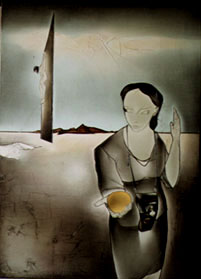
Christ, Leica and orange, 92x73cm, 1963

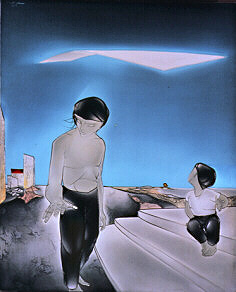
L'adolescent et l'enfant, oil on canvas, 100x81 cm, 1963

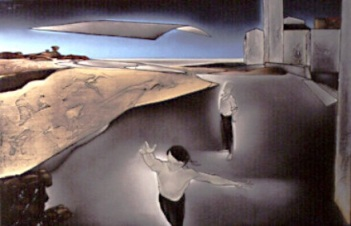
Two people on the beach, 100x63cm, 1963

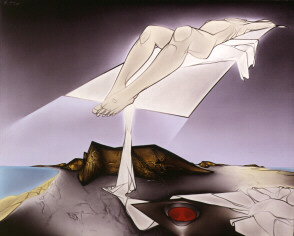
Pain vivant cosmique, oil on canvas, 81x100 cm, 1978

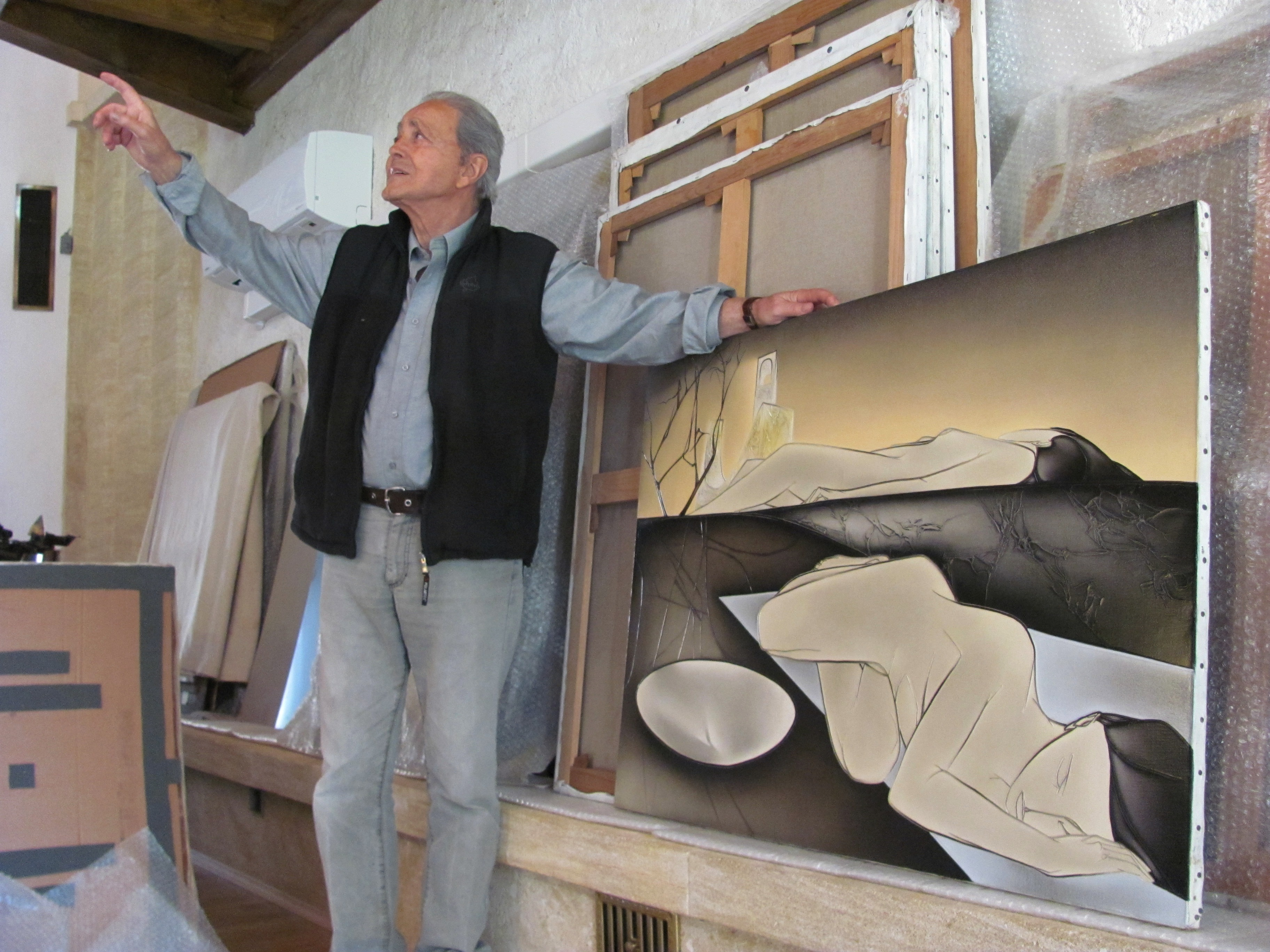
Yatrides surrounded by his paintings

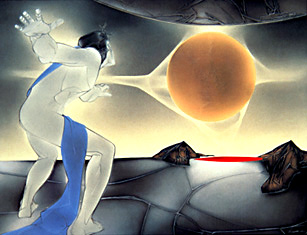
Essential vibration, 97x130cm, 1982

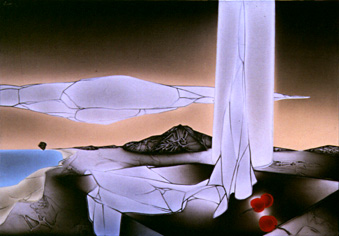
The spiral pillar of time, 65x92cm, 1982

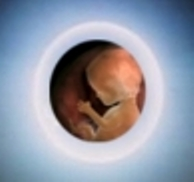
Bowman embryogenetic resurrection
