= Caleb Schaber =

American journalist (1973–2009)

- Caleb Schaber and the Seattle Monolith
- Born: Caleb Schaber; March 23, 1973; Niles, Michigan
- Died: April 17, 2009 (aged 36); Gerlach, Nevada
- Education: University of Washington
- Known for: Painting, sculpture, and music
- Website: http://calebschaber.com/

Caleb David Schaber (March 23, 1973 – April 17, 2009) was an American artist and journalist best known for his participation in the Seattle Monolith project at the beginning of 2001 and his run for mayor of Seattle later that same year.

== Early life ==
Schaber was born March 23, 1973, in Niles, Michigan. He attended school at the Gifted and Talented Academy in Fairplain and enrolled at Lake Michigan College at the age of 16. He graduated Lake Michigan College in 1991 and moved to Seattle in 1993. He enrolled at the University of Washington in 1995 with a major in anthropology and a minor in art, and graduated with a Bachelor of Arts degree in 2002.

== Life in Seattle ==
Shortly after moving to Seattle, Schaber did a cannonball off the 167-foot high George Washington Memorial Bridge while intoxicated. He broke his spine and spent nine days in the hospital. A steel rod was used to repair his back. He is one of only 30 people to have survived the 15-story plunge into Lake Union from the bridge.

While studying for his degree at the University of Washington, he wrote for the school newspaper The Daily. One of his articles was titled "Flatulence is natural – free a fart". Many of Schaber's articles generated responses from the readers.

Schaber was a bartender for the Blue Moon Tavern and while he worked there he painted images of the presidents above the urinals in the men's room. Schaber said, "We called them the Presidential Fountains. People could go in and cast their ballot." He enjoyed modern art. He owned a custom-built guitar made from an old bike that was showcased at Make magazine's Best of Maker Faire 2008. He owned an art car and was involved with the Burning Man group of artists. He worked on the political news show Deface the Nation with Jeff Pearson.

== The Seattle Monolith ==
Early on New Year's Day 2001, a monolith mysteriously appeared on Kite Hill in Seattle's Magnuson Park. The monolith was similar to the one in Stanley Kubrick's movie 2001: A Space Odyssey. There was no indication of how it got there or who put it there. The event made front-page news in The Seattle Times'. The media dubbed the object the Seattle Monolith as the news traveled across the United States and other nations.

On January 3, the monolith disappeared as mysteriously as it had appeared. The monolith was later found on an island in the middle of Seattle's Green Lake. Schaber came forward as a spokesperson for a group called Some People, who created the monolith, stating they had installed the artwork but didn't know who moved it to Duck Island. The group wanted help to retrieve the artwork and asked for permission to have it reinstalled at Magnuson Park. Schaber became a bit of a celebrity during this period and remarked that "We're just pleased that we were able to send a positive message out to the world from Seattle."

== Race for mayor ==
In April 2001, Schaber declared his intention to run for mayor of Seattle. Although he did not believe he would win, he took the race very seriously. He felt the police department should have cops on the beat in local neighborhoods. He supported the Monorail and he thought the city should have a permanent tent city for the homeless. Gus Hellthaler, owner of the Blue Moon Tavern, helped with Schaber's campaign.

== Combat journalist ==
In 2004, Schaber traveled to Iraq as a combat journalist embedded with the Nevada National Guard. Schaber covered the war on the front line. Schaber spent ten months covering the war in Afghanistan when he was embedded with the Indiana National Guard in 2006.

== Death ==
On April 17, 2009, Schaber died as a result of a self-inflicted gunshot wound in Gerlach, Nevada. Schaber had been suffering from post traumatic stress disorder for several years. Memorials in Schaber's honor were held in multiple places across the country, including:

- Buchanan, Michigan
- Reno, Nevada
- Seattle, Washington
- San Francisco, California (Ocean Beach)
- Gerlach, Nevada (Frog Pond)
- Austin (Dead End)

== Legacy ==
A scholarship in Schaber's name was established for the study of visual arts at Lake Michigan College.

A biographical feature film (which originally began as a co-written treatment in 2007) based on Caleb's life, times, art, writing and videography during the recent Iraq and Afghanistan wars has recently resumed pre-production after a period of mourning by the filmmakers, who were longtime friends of Caleb's before his untimely passing. Through the telling of his life story, the filmmakers wish to celebrate Caleb's DIY spirit as well as offer an empathetic, entertaining portrait of a complex individual whose way of life raised as many eyebrows as it did spirits (both in the bottle and with sentient beings) around the world. Along with the feature film, a book Caleb was working on is also slated for completion and release.

== See also ==
- Seattle Monolith
- Burning Man
- The Daily of the University of Washington
