= Tečovice =

- Municipality
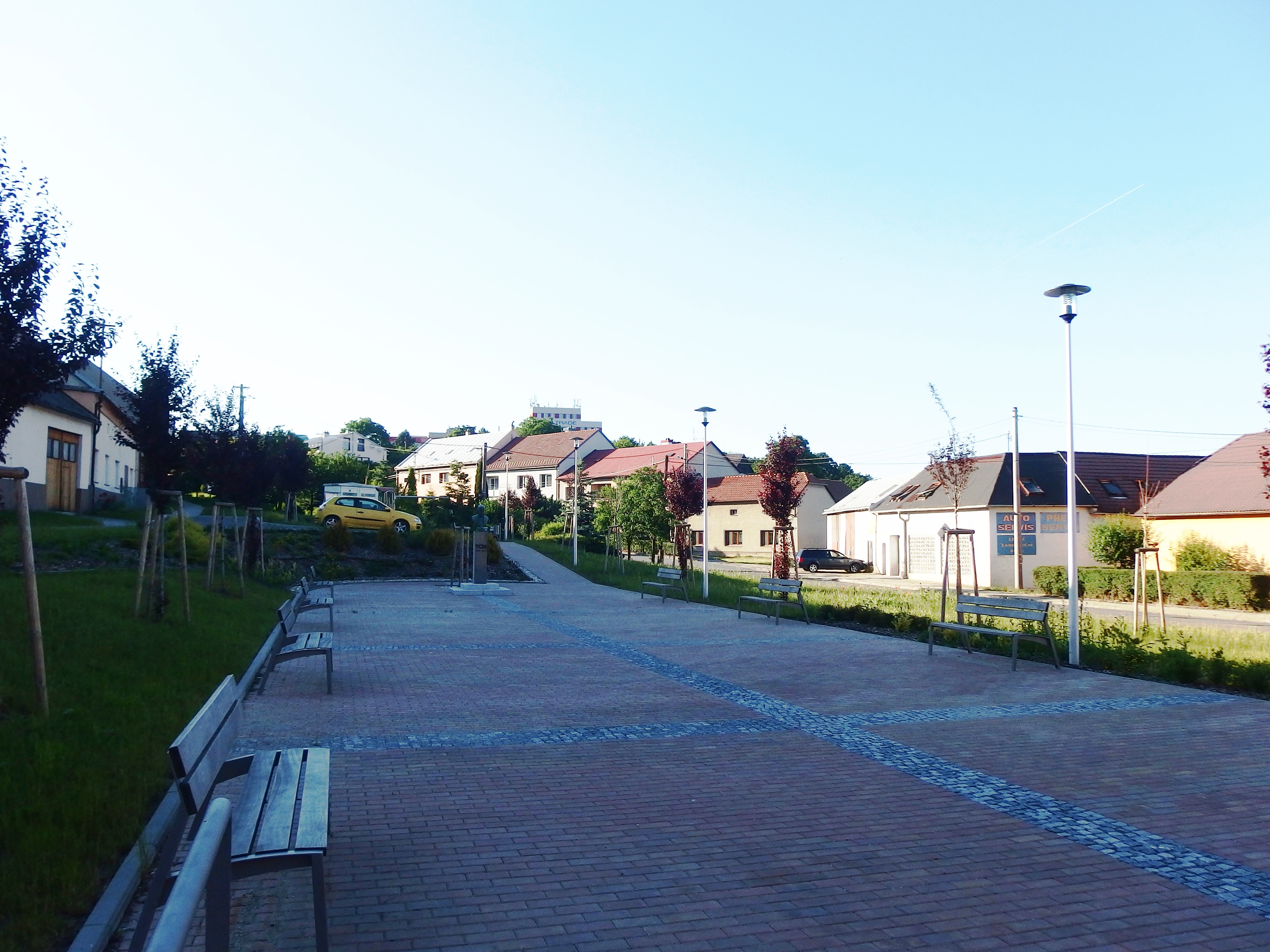
- Common in Tečovice

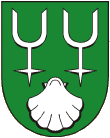
- Flag Coat of arms

- Location in the Czech Republic
- Coordinates: 49°13′16″N 17°35′14″E
- Country: Czech Republic
- Region: Zlín
- District: Zlín
- First mentioned: 1141

Area
  - Total: 6.67 km^{2} (2.58 sq mi)
- Elevation: 208 m (682 ft)

Population (2026-01-01)
  - Total: 1,480
  - Density: 222/km^{2} (575/sq mi)
- Time zone: UTC+1 (CET)
  - Summer (DST): UTC+2 (CEST)
- Postal code: 763 02
- Website: www.tecovice.cz

Tečovice is a municipality and village in Zlín District in the Zlín Region of the Czech Republic. It has about 1,500 inhabitants.

Tečovice lies approximately 7 kilometres (4 mi) west of Zlín and 248 km (154 mi) south-east of Prague.

== Demographics ==
Historical population
Year	Pop.	±%
1869	570	—
1880	665	+16.7%
1890	717	+7.8%
1900	762	+6.3%
1910	765	+0.4%
1921	884	+15.6%
1930	1,005	+13.7%
1950	1,220	+21.4%
1961	1,343	+10.1%
1970	1,238	−7.8%
1980	1,232	−0.5%
1991	1,094	−11.2%
2001	1,229	+12.3%
2011	1,287	+4.7%
2021	1,349	+4.8%
Source: Censuses
