= 3000 Leonardo =

Carbonaceous main-belt asteroid

Discovery
- Discovered by: S. J. Bus
- Discovery site: Siding Spring Obs.
- Discovery date: 2 March 1981

Designations
- Named after: Leonardo da Vinci (Renaissance polymath)
- Alternative designations: 1981 EG_{19} · 1961 XB; 1975 NK_{1} · 1979 UT_{4} 1979 WC_{6}
- Minor planet category: main-belt · (inner) background

Orbital characteristics
- Epoch 27 April 2019 (JD 2458600.5)
- Uncertainty parameter 0
- Observation arc: 56.76 yr (20,731 d)
- Aphelion: 2.7755 AU
- Perihelion: 1.9268 AU
- Semi-major axis: 2.3511 AU
- Eccentricity: 0.1805
- Orbital period (sidereal): 3.61 yr (1,317 d)
- Mean anomaly: 358.39°
- Mean motion: 0° 16^{m} 24.24^{s} / day
- Inclination: 2.7514°
- Longitude of ascending node: 200.98°
- Argument of perihelion: 173.67°

Physical characteristics
- Mean diameter: 9.044±1.725 km 9.05±2.22 km 9.777±0.277 km 9.838±0.068 km 10.6±1.1 km
- Synodic rotation period: 7.524±0.021 h
- Geometric albedo: 0.05; 0.0585; 0.06; 0.115; 0.117
- Spectral type: SMASS = B
- Absolute magnitude (H): 13.60; 13.70; 13.80

3000 Leonardo, provisional designation 1981 EG_{19}, is a carbonaceous background asteroid from the inner regions of the asteroid belt, approximately 9.5 kilometers (5.9 miles) in diameter. It was discovered on 2 March 1981, by American astronomer Schelte Bus at the Siding Spring Observatory in Australia. The B-type asteroid has a rotation period of 7.5 hours. It was named for the Italian polymath Leonardo da Vinci.

== Orbit and classification ==
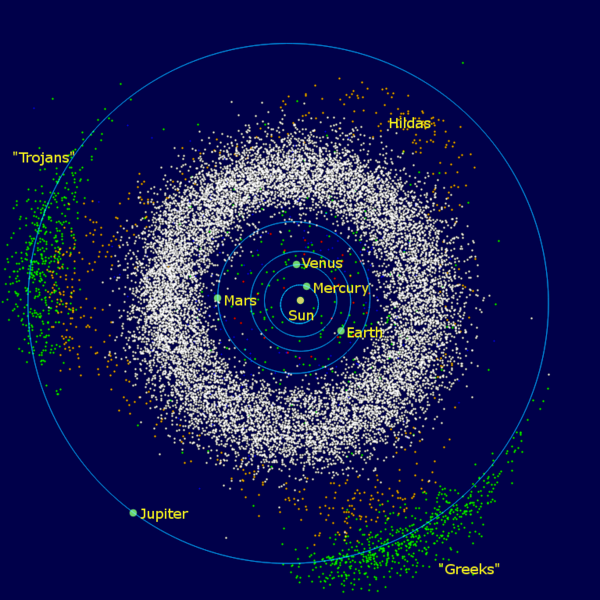
3000 Leonardo is located in the main asteroid belt, a major concentration of asteroids in the inner Solar System between about 2-3 AU

Leonardo is a non-family asteroid from the main belt's background population. It orbits the Sun in the inner asteroid belt at a distance of 1.9–2.8 AU once every 3 years and 7 months (1,317 days; semi-major axis of 2.35 AU). Its orbit has an eccentricity of 0.18 and an inclination of 3° with respect to the ecliptic. The body's observation arc begins with a precovery taken at the Goethe Link Observatory in December 1961, more than 19 years prior to its official discovery observation at Siding Spring.

In 1986, 3000 Leonardo was observed to be at its predicted location. It was one of 450 minor planets whose location was checked in a large observation campaign involving multiple sites and astronomers. 3000 Leonard was visually observed by Roger E. Harvey on August 30, 1986 with a 73 cm Newtonian telescope from eastern North America (Concord, North Carolina in the United States).

== Name ==
This minor planet after the Italian polymath of the Renaissance Leonardo da Vinci (1452–1519) from Florence. He was a painter, sculptor, architect, musician, engineer and natural philosopher. The official naming citation was published by the Minor Planet Center on 29 September 1985 (M.P.C. 10044). He is also honored by both a lunar and a Martian crater (Da Vinci and Da Vinci, respectively). The asteroid is one of several early "kilo-numbered" minor planets that were dedicated to renowned scientists or institutions including:

- 1000 Piazzia named for Giuseppe Piazzi, discoverer of Ceres
- 2000 Herschel for William Herschel who discovered Uranus
- 3000 Leonardo for Leonardo da Vinci
- 4000 Hipparchus for ancient Greek astronomer Hipparchus

The sequence continues with the asteroids 5000 IAU (for the International Astronomical Union), 6000 United Nations (for the United Nations), 7000 Curie (for the pioneers on radioactivity, Marie and Pierre Curie), and 8000 Isaac Newton (for Isaac Newton), while 9000 Hal (after HAL 9000 from 2001: A Space Odyssey) and 10000 Myriostos (after the Greek word for ten-thousandth, which is meant to honor all astronomers) were named based on their direct numeric accordance.

By 2001, 3000 Leonardo was one of 32 named minor planets named after painters and sculptors, and some other examples in this category include 3001 Michelangelo (the next named asteroid numerically), 4221 Picasso, and 4457 van Gogh. Although these were classically named, the 1980s were a time of new concepts in naming, and it was a popular time to name minor planets after acronyms (such as 3568 ASCII) and one astronomer promoted more whimsical names including successfully naming one discovery after his pet. However, there was a backlash against naming asteroids after pets, and the IAU does not recommend minor planets be named after pets.

At the time of 3000 Leonardo's discovery and naming only a few thousand asteroids had been discovered and named, it would not be until the 1990s and early 2000s when there was a massive spike in asteroid discoveries, with the peak year up to the year 2010, being 2000. In the year 2000, over 40,000 minor planets were recorded, and in the years after many tens of thousands were discovered leading to almost 220,000 numbered minor planets by late 2009.

== Physical characteristics ==
Leonardo was one of 1341 main-belt asteroids observed between 1993 and 1999 as part of Small Main-Belt Asteroid Spectroscopic Survey (SMASSII). In the SMASS taxonomy, it has a spectral type of a B-type asteroid, a "bright" carbonaceous body that is less common than the abundant C-type asteroids.

=== Rotation period ===
In October 2015, a rotational lightcurve of Leonardo was obtained from photometric observations by astronomers at the University of Maryland using a 0.43-meter telescope at Mayhill, New Mexico (H10). Lightcurve analysis gave a rotation period of 7.524±0.021 hours with a brightness variation of 0.26 magnitude (U=2). The result supersedes a tentative period determination by astronomers at Lindby Observatory (K60) which gave a spin rate of 8.54 and an amplitude of 0.20 magnitude (U=1).

=== Diameter and albedo ===
According to the survey carried out by the NEOWISE mission of NASA's Wide-field Infrared Survey Explorer, Leonardo measures between 9.03 and 11 kilometers in diameter and its surface has an albedo between 0.05 and 0.117.

The Collaborative Asteroid Lightcurve Link assumes a standard albedo for a stony asteroid of 0.20 (rather than for a carbonaceous one) and consequently calculates a shorter diameter of 5.41 kilometers based on an absolute magnitude of 13.7.

== See also ==
- 30000 Camenzind (minor planet number thirty thousand)
