= 2000 Herschel =

Stony main-belt asteroid

Discovery
- Discovered by: J. Schubart
- Discovery site: Sonneberg Obs.
- Discovery date: 29 July 1960

Designations
- Pronunciation: /ˈhɜːrʃəl/
- Named after: William Herschel (German-British astronomer)
- Alternative designations: 1960 OA · 1934 NX
- Minor planet category: main-belt · (inner); Phocaea

Orbital characteristics
- Epoch 27 April 2019 (JD 2458600.5)
- Uncertainty parameter 0
- Observation arc: 84.08 yr (30,712 d)
- Aphelion: 3.0885 AU
- Perihelion: 1.6708 AU
- Semi-major axis: 2.3796 AU
- Eccentricity: 0.2979
- Orbital period (sidereal): 3.67 yr (1,341 d)
- Mean anomaly: 293.69°
- Mean motion: 0° 16^{m} 6.6^{s} / day
- Inclination: 22.819°
- Longitude of ascending node: 291.92°
- Argument of perihelion: 130.51°

Physical characteristics
- Mean diameter: 14.768±0.348 km 16.15±3.11 km 16.86±1.17 km 17.385±0.173 km
- Synodic rotation period: 130±2 h
- Geometric albedo: 0.1870; 0.197; 0.24; 0.256
- Spectral type: Tholen = S B–V = 0.893; U–B = 0.494
- Absolute magnitude (H): 11.25; 11.42

2000 Herschel, provisional designation 1960 OA, is a stony Phocaea asteroid and a tumbling slow rotator from the inner regions of the asteroid belt, approximately 16 kilometers (10 miles) in diameter. It was discovered 29 July 1960, by German astronomer Joachim Schubart at Sonneberg Observatory in eastern Germany. The S-type asteroid has a long rotation period of 130 hours. It was named after astronomer William Herschel.

== Orbit and classification ==
Herschel is a member of the Phocaea family (701), a large family of stony asteroids with nearly two thousand known members. It orbits the Sun in the inner main-belt at a distance of 1.7–3.1 AU once every 3 years and 8 months (1,341 days; semi-major axis of 2.38 AU). Its orbit has an eccentricity of 0.30 and an inclination of 23° with respect to the ecliptic. It was first identified as 1934 NX at Johannesburg Observatory in 1934, extending the body's observation arc by 26 years prior to its official discovery observation at Sonneberg.

The relatively high orbital eccentricity of this object causes it to come close to the orbit of the planet Mars. This means there is a chance it will eventually collide with the planet, with the odds of a collision estimated at 18% per billion orbits.

== Naming ==
This minor planet was named in honour of the English astronomer of German origin William Herschel (1738–1822), who discovered what he called Georgium Sidus (aka Uranus). The official naming citation was published by the Minor Planet Center on 15 October 1977 (M.P.C. 4237). While the minor planet with number "1000", 1000 Piazzia, honors the discoverer of the first minor planet, Giuseppe Piazzi, number "2000" does so for Herschel, discoverer of the first telescopic major planet. The asteroid is one of several early "kilo-numbered" minor planets that were dedicated to renowned scientists or institutions including:

- 1000 Piazzia named for Giuseppe Piazzi, discoverer of Ceres
- 2000 Herschel for William Herschel who discovered Uranus
- 3000 Leonardo for the Italian polymath of the Renaissance, Leonardo da Vinci
- 4000 Hipparchus for ancient Greek astronomer Hipparchus

The sequence continues with the asteroids 5000 IAU (for the International Astronomical Union), 6000 United Nations (for the United Nations), 7000 Curie (for the pioneers on radioactivity, Marie and Pierre Curie), and 8000 Isaac Newton (for Isaac Newton), while 9000 Hal (after HAL 9000 from 2001: A Space Odyssey) and 10000 Myriostos (after the Greek word for ten-thousandth, which is meant to honor all astronomers) were named based on their direct numeric accordance.

== Physical characteristics ==
In the Tholen classification, Herschel is a common S-type asteroid.

=== Slow rotator and tumbler ===
Analysis of the lightcurve for this object appears to show that it is tumbling, with rotation occurring about the non-principal axis. Lightcurve analysis gave a rotation period of 130±3 hours with a high brightness variation of 1.16±0.05 magnitude (U=2). This makes it a slow rotator.

=== Diameter and albedo ===
The Collaborative Asteroid Lightcurve Link assumes a standard albedo for a stony asteroid of 0.20 and calculates a diameter of 16.71 kilometers based on an absolute magnitude of 11.25. According to the surveys carried out by the Japanese Akari satellite and the NEOWISE mission of NASA's Wide-field Infrared Survey Explorer, Herschel measures between 14.768 and 17.385 kilometers in diameter and its surface has an albedo between 0.1870 and 0.256.

== See also ==
- 20000 Varuna
