= 4000 Hipparchus =

Main-belt asteroid

Discovery
- Discovered by: S. Ueda; H. Kaneda
- Discovery site: Kushiro Obs.
- Discovery date: 4 January 1989

Designations
- Pronunciation: /hɪˈpɑːrkəs/
- Named after: Hipparchus (ancient Greek astronomer)
- Alternative designations: 1989 AV · 1963 XA; 1975 TW_{4} · 1977 FZ_{2} 1978 NG_{8} · 1979 WU_{4} 1984 YX_{5} · 1987 SD_{18}
- Minor planet category: main-belt · (middle) background · Astraea

Orbital characteristics
- Epoch 27 April 2019 (JD 2458600.5)
- Uncertainty parameter 0
- Observation arc: 63.50 yr (23,192 d)
- Aphelion: 2.8835 AU
- Perihelion: 2.2968 AU
- Semi-major axis: 2.5901 AU
- Eccentricity: 0.1133
- Orbital period (sidereal): 4.17 yr (1,523 d)
- Mean anomaly: 78.842°
- Mean motion: 0° 14^{m} 11.04^{s} / day
- Inclination: 2.7163°
- Longitude of ascending node: 318.53°
- Argument of perihelion: 173.15°

Physical characteristics
- Mean diameter: 15.13±4.81 km 17.485±0.032 km 18.217±0.094 km 18.87±0.59 km
- Synodic rotation period: 3.418±0.001 h
- Geometric albedo: 0.0388; 0.046; 0.05; 0.052
- Absolute magnitude (H): 12.60; 12.8; 13.01

4000 Hipparchus /hɪˈpɑːrkəs/ is a dark background asteroid from the central regions of the asteroid belt, approximately 17 kilometers (11 miles) in diameter. It was discovered on 4 January 1989, by Japanese astronomers Seiji Ueda and Hiroshi Kaneda at the Kushiro Observatory on Hokkaido, Japan. The likely carbonaceous asteroid has a short rotation period of 3.4 hours. It was named for the ancient Greek astronomer Hipparchus.

== Orbit and classification ==
Hipparchus is a non-family asteroid from the main belt's background population (according to Nesvorný). Conversely, an alternative application of the hierarchical clustering method found it to be a core member of the Astraea family (according to Milani and Knežević). It orbits the Sun in the central asteroid belt at a distance of 2.3–2.9 AU once every 4 years and 2 months (1,523 days; semi-major axis of 2.59 AU). Its orbit has an eccentricity of 0.11 and an inclination of 3° with respect to the ecliptic. The body's observation arc begins with a precovery taken at the Palomar Observatory in November 1954, or more than 34 years prior to its official discovery observation at Kushiro (399).

== Naming ==
This minor planet was named by IAU's Working Group for Planetary System Nomenclature after the Greek astronomer Hipparchus (c. 190 – c. 120 BC), considered to be the greatest astronomer of ancient times. Hipparchus introduced a systematic and critical approach to both theoretical and observational astronomy. He is also honored by a lunar and a Martian crater (Hipparchus and Hipparchus, respectively). The official naming citation was published by the Minor Planet Center on 21 November 1991 (M.P.C. 19335). The asteroid is one of several early "kilo-numbered" minor planets that were dedicated to renowned scientists or institutions including:

- 1000 Piazzia named for Giuseppe Piazzi, discoverer of Ceres
- 2000 Herschel for William Herschel who discovered Uranus
- 3000 Leonardo for the Italian polymath of the Renaissance, Leonardo da Vinci

4000 Hipparchus is follow by the asteroids 5000 IAU (for the International Astronomical Union), 6000 United Nations (for the United Nations), 7000 Curie (for the pioneers on radioactivity, Marie and Pierre Curie), and 8000 Isaac Newton (for Isaac Newton), while 9000 Hal (after HAL 9000 from the movie 2001: A Space Odyssey) and 10000 Myriostos (after the Greek word for ten-thousandth, and to honor all astronomers) were named based on their direct numeric accordance.

== Physical characteristics ==
Based on its low albedo of around 0.04–0.05 (see below), Hipparchus is likely of a carbonaceous rather than siliceous composition, among which the C-type asteroid are the most common ones in the asteroid belt.

=== Rotation period ===
In February 2014, a rotational lightcurve of Hipparchus was obtained from photometric observations by astronomers at the Phillips Academy (I12) and HUT (H16) observatories. Lightcurve analysis gave a rotation period of 3.418±0.001 hours with a brightness amplitude of 0.11 magnitude (U=2). A previous observation at the Palomar Transient Factory from August 2012, only gave a fragmentary lightcurve with a longer period of 7.935 hours (U=1).

=== Diameter and albedo ===
According to the surveys carried out by the Japanese Akari satellite and the NEOWISE mission of NASA's Wide-field Infrared Survey Explorer, Hipparchus measures between 15.13 and 18.87 kilometers in diameter and its surface has a low albedo between 0.039 and 0.052. The Collaborative Asteroid Lightcurve Link assumes a standard albedo for a stony asteroid (rather than for a carbonaceous one) and consequently and calculates a smaller diameter of 8.18 kilometers based on an absolute magnitude of 12.8.
