= 1000 Piazzia =

Main-belt asteroid

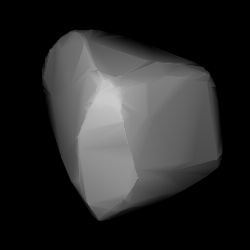
- Modelled shape of Piazzia from its lightcurve

Discovery
- Discovered by: K. Reinmuth
- Discovery site: Heidelberg Obs.
- Discovery date: 12 August 1923

Designations
- Pronunciation: /piˈætsiə/
- Named after: Giuseppe Piazzi (Italian astronomer)
- Alternative designations: 1923 NZ · A923 PF; 1951 OB · 1967 ED
- Minor planet category: main-belt · (outer); background

Orbital characteristics
- Epoch 27 April 2019 (JD 2458600.5)
- Uncertainty parameter 0
- Observation arc: 94.83 yr (34,637 d)
- Aphelion: 3.9909 AU
- Perihelion: 2.3511 AU
- Semi-major axis: 3.1710 AU
- Eccentricity: 0.2586
- Orbital period (sidereal): 5.65 yr (2,063 d)
- Mean anomaly: 347.91°
- Mean motion: 0° 10^{m} 28.2^{s} / day
- Inclination: 20.574°
- Longitude of ascending node: 323.74°
- Argument of perihelion: 280.90°

Physical characteristics
- Mean diameter: 47.78±2.0 km; 49.54±6.12 km; 51.55±0.86 km
- Synodic rotation period: 9.47±0.01 h
- Geometric albedo: 0.041; 0.097; 0.1119
- Spectral type: C/Cb (S3OS2)
- Apparent magnitude: 14.1 – 17.6
- Absolute magnitude (H): 9.60; 10.5; 10.60; 10.61

1000 Piazzia, provisional designation 1923 NZ, is a carbonaceous background asteroid from the outer region of the asteroid belt, approximately 48 kilometers (30 miles) in diameter. It was discovered on 12 August 1923, by German astronomer Karl Reinmuth at Heidelberg Observatory in southern Germany. The C-type asteroid has a rotation period of 9.5 hours. It was named after Italian Giuseppe Piazzi, who discovered 1 Ceres.

== Orbit and classification ==
Orbit of Piazzia (blue), the inner planets and Jupiter

Piazzia is a non-family asteroid from the main belt's background population. It orbits the Sun in the outer asteroid belt at a distance of 2.4–4.0 AU once every 5 years and 8 months (2,063 days; semi-major axis of 3.17 AU). Its orbit has an eccentricity of 0.26 and an inclination of 21° with respect to the ecliptic. As no precoveries were taken, the body's observation arc begins with its first recorded observation on the night following its official discovery date.

== Naming ==
This minor planet was named in honour of Italian Theatine monk Giuseppe Piazzi (1746–1826). He was a director of both the Palermo and Naples observatories, and known for the compilation of the Palermo Catalogue, containing the precise position of 7,646 stars. In 1801, Piazzi discovered 1 Ceres, the first and largest asteroid and the main-belt's only dwarf planet. He is also honored by the lunar crater Piazzi. The official naming citation was first mentioned in The Names of the Minor Planets by Paul Herget in 1955 (H 96). The asteroid is the first of several early "kilo-numbered" minor planets that were dedicated to renowned scientists or institutions including:

- 2000 Herschel, for William Herschel who discovered Uranus
- 3000 Leonardo, for the Italian polymath of the Renaissance, Leonardo da Vinci
- 4000 Hipparchus, for the ancient Greek astronomer Hipparchus

These are followed by the asteroids 5000 IAU (for the International Astronomical Union), 6000 United Nations (for the United Nations), 7000 Curie (for the pioneers on radioactivity, Marie and Pierre Curie), and 8000 Isaac Newton (for Isaac Newton), while 9000 Hal (after HAL 9000 from the movie 2001: A Space Odyssey) and 10000 Myriostos (after the Greek word for ten-thousandth, and to honor all astronomers) were named based on their direct numeric accordance.

1000 Piazzia was named as part of trio honoring the events surrounding the discovery of Ceres in 1801. A person named Carl Friedrich Gauss who computed the orbit of Ceres, and Heinrich Wilhelm Matthias Olbers who found it again later that year after it has passed behind the Sun. In honor of them, 1001 Gaussia for Gauss and 1002 Olbersia for Olbers were named along with 1000 Piazzia. In the next few years only three more astronomical bodies were found between Mars and Jupiter, Pallas, Juno, and 4 Vesta, however it would be 37 years before another asteroid was found, 5 Astraea in 1845.

By 1868, 100 asteroids had been discovered, however it would not be until 1921 that the 1000th was discovered. The rate accelerated in the 20th century and the ten thousandth would be discovered in 1989.

== Physical characteristics ==
In the Tholen- and SMASS-like taxonomy of the Small Solar System Objects Spectroscopic Survey (S3OS2), Piazzia is a carbonaceous C-type and Cb-subtype, respectively, latter which transitions to the somewhat "brighter" B-type asteroids.

=== Rotation period ===
After Piazzia had been published by The Minor Planet Bulletin as an opportunity for photometry in 2001, a classically shaped bimodal lightcurve was obtained by Robert Stephens at the Santana Observatory (646) in Rancho Cucamonga, California. The lightcurve gave a rotation period of 9.47±0.01 hours with a brightness variation of 0.45 magnitude (U=3). A second lightcurve was obtained by astronomer René Roy in March 2007, rendering a period of 9.2±0.2 hours and an amplitude of 0.2 magnitude (U=2).

=== Diameter and albedo ===
The Collaborative Asteroid Lightcurve Link derives a low albedo of 0.05 and a diameter of 47.19 kilometers based on an absolute magnitude of 10.5. According to the space-based surveys carried out by the Infrared Astronomical Satellite IRAS, the Japanese Akari satellite and the NEOWISE mission of NASA's Wide-field Infrared Survey Explorer, Piazzia measures between 45.72 and 51.55 kilometers in diameter and its surface has an albedo between 0.041 and 0.1119.

== See also ==
- List of minor planets: 1001–2000
- 100000 Astronautica (the 100,000th numbered minor planet)
