= Piazzi =

Piazzi is an Italian surname. Notable people with the surname include:

- Charles Piazzi Smyth (1819–1900), British astronomer
- Fladimir Rufino Piazzi Júnior, (born 1978) Brazilian footballer
- Giuseppe Piazzi, Italian Theatine monk, mathematician, and astronomer
- Giuseppe Piazzi (bishop) (1907–1963), Italian bishop
- Piero Piazzi (born 1963), international fashion modelling manager and talent scout

== See also ==
- Piazza (surname)
- Piazzi (crater)
- Cima Piazzi
- Spiazzi (disambiguation)
