= Restrictive eating =

The term restrictive eating might refer or relate to:

- Anorexia nervosa, an eating disorder in which people avoid eating due to concerns about body weight or body image
- Avoidant/restrictive food intake disorder, an eating disorder in which people avoid eating or eat only a very narrow range of foods
- Dieting, the practice of restricting food intake in a regulated way to decrease body weight
- Fasting, the willing abstention from eating
