= 1001 Gaussia =

Main-belt asteroid

- Orbit of Gaussia (blue) compared to those of the inner planets and Jupiter (outermost)

Discovery
- Discovered by: S. Belyavskyj
- Discovery site: Simeiz Obs.
- Discovery date: 8 August 1923

Designations
- Pronunciation: /ˈɡaʊsiə/
- Named after: Carl Friedrich Gauss (German mathematician)
- Alternative designations: 1923 OA · A907 XC; A911 MD
- Minor planet category: main-belt · (outer)

Orbital characteristics
- Epoch 4 September 2017 (JD 2458000.5)
- Uncertainty parameter 0
- Observation arc: 109.33 yr (39,933 days)
- Aphelion: 3.6150 AU
- Perihelion: 2.8046 AU
- Semi-major axis: 3.2098 AU
- Eccentricity: 0.1262
- Orbital period (sidereal): 5.75 yr (2,100 days)
- Mean anomaly: 121.11°
- Mean motion: 0° 10^{m} 17.04^{s} / day
- Inclination: 9.2958°
- Longitude of ascending node: 259.32°
- Argument of perihelion: 142.51°

Physical characteristics
- Dimensions: 67.80±19.69 km 68.51±21.78 km 72.422±1.517 km 72.711±0.298 km 74.67±3.8 km 74.71 km (derived); 75.40±0.99 km 80.07±0.68 km
- Synodic rotation period: 4.08±0.05 h 9.17±0.01 h 20.99±0.01 h (Note: Aznar (2016a): Observation 2015-11-22. Rotation period 20.99±0.01 hours with a brightness amplitude of 0.11±0.01 mag. Quality Code of 3. Summary figures for (1001) Gaussia at Collaborative Asteroid Lightcurve Link (CALL))
- Geometric albedo: 0.036±0.007; 0.039±0.001; 0.0392±0.004; 0.041±0.004; 0.0416±0.0054; 0.0417 (derived); 0.05±0.03; 0.05±0.04
- Spectral type: Tholen = PC; B–V = 0.689; U–B = 0.265
- Absolute magnitude (H): 9.70 · 9.72 · 9.77 · 9.8 · 9.91±0.26

Gaussia (minor planet designation: 1001 Gaussia), provisional designation 1923 OA, is a dark background asteroid from the outer regions of the asteroid belt, approximately 73 kilometers in diameter. It was discovered on 8 August 1923, by Soviet astronomer Sergey Belyavsky at the Simeiz Observatory on the Crimean peninsula. The asteroid was named after German mathematician Carl Friedrich Gauss. Gauss computed the orbit of Ceres, and 1001 Gaussia was named along with 1000 Piazzia, and 1002 Olbersia in part for their work on Ceres, with names for Giuseppe Piazzi, who found Ceres, and Heinrich Wilhelm Matthias Olbers, who recovered it later that year.

== Orbit and classification ==
Gaussia is a background asteroid that does not belong to any known asteroid family. It orbits the Sun in the outer main-belt at a distance of 2.8–3.6 AU once every 5 years and 9 months (2,100 days). Its orbit has an eccentricity of 0.13 and an inclination of 9° with respect to the ecliptic.

The asteroid was first identified as A907 XC at Taunton Observatory (803) in December 1907. The body's observation arc begins at UNSO in January 1908, more than 15 years prior to its official discovery observation at Simeiz.

== Physical characteristics ==
In the Tholen classification, Gaussia has an ambiguous spectral type. Its type is closest to the primitive P-type asteroids, followed by the common carbonaceous C-type asteroids.

=== Rotation period ===
In November 2005, a rotational lightcurve of Gaussia was obtained from photometric observations. Lightcurve analysis gave a well-defined rotation period of 20.99 hours with a brightness amplitude of 0.11 magnitude (U=3).

Lower-rated lightcurves with a divergent period of 4.08 and 9.17 hours were previously obtained in 2005 and 2009, respectively (U=1/2-).

=== Diameter and albedo ===
According to the surveys carried out by the Infrared Astronomical Satellite IRAS, the Japanese Akari satellite and the NEOWISE mission of NASA's Wide-field Infrared Survey Explorer, Gaussia measures between 67.80 and 80.07 kilometers in diameter and its surface has an albedo between 0.036 and 0.05.

The Collaborative Asteroid Lightcurve Link derives an albedo of 0.0417 and a diameter of 74.71 kilometers based on an absolute magnitude of 9.7.

== Naming ==
This minor planet was named by Swedish astronomer Bror Ansgar Asplind after Carl Friedrich Gauss (1777–1855), German mathematician and director of the Göttingen Observatory (528), who also rediscovered Ceres using a new orbital computing method by Franz Xaver von Zach.

The official naming citation was mentioned in The Names of the Minor Planets by Paul Herget in 1955 (H 96). He is also honored by the lunar crater Gauss.

1001 Gaussia was named as part of trio honoring the events surrounding the discovery of Ceres in 1801. Carl Friedrich Gauss who computed the orbit of Ceres was for 1001 Gaussia, 1000 Piazzia for Giuseppe Piazzi and 1002 Olbersia for Heinrich Wilhelm Matthias Olbers. Olbers recovered Ceres after it has passed behind the Sun and returned. In the next few years only three more astronomical bodies were found between Mars and Jupiter, Pallas, Juno, and 4 Vesta, however it would be 37 years before another asteroid was found, 5 Astraea in 1845.

== See also ==
- List of minor planets: 1–1000
- List of minor planets: 1001–2000
