= Piazza (surname) =

Piazza is an Italian surname. Notable people with the surname include:

- Adeodato Giovanni Piazza (1884–1957), Italian Cardinal of the Roman Catholic Church
- Alberto Piazza (1941–2024), Italian human geneticist
- Aldo Piazza (born 1956), Italian mayor of Agrigento
- Andrew Piazza (born 1954), American former basketball player
- Antonio Piazza (born 1970), Italian screenwriter and director
- Callisto Piazza (1500–1561), Italian painter
- Cathleen Piazza, medical researcher at the University of Nebraska
- Chris Piazza (born 1946), American judge
- Honey Piazza (born 1951), American piano player
- Ignatius Piazza (born 1960), founder and director of the Front Sight Firearms Training Institute
- Luigi Piazza (1884–1967), Italian operatic baritone
- Marguerite Piazza (1926–2012), American soprano and entertainer
- Maria Piazza (1894–1976), Italian mineralogist and educator
- Marzia Piazza (born 1951), Venezuelan beauty pageant titleholder
- Michael S. Piazza, American author and social justice advocate
- Mike Piazza (born 1968), American Major League Baseball catcher
- Osvaldo Piazza (born 1947), Argentine football defender and manager
- Roberto Dipiazza (born 1953), Italian mayor of Trieste
- Rod Piazza (born 1947), American blues harmonica player and singer
- Tim Piazza (1997–2017), American student killed in college fraternity hazing incident
- Valeria Piazza (born 1989), Peruvian social communicator, model, and beauty pageant titleholder
- Vincent Piazza (born 1976), American actor
- Wilson da Silva Piazza (born 1943), Brazilian football player

== See also ==
- Piazza (disambiguation)
- Piazzi
