= Not eating =

Not eating could refer to:

- Fasting
  - Hunger strike
- Anorexia (symptom), a loss of appetite
- Starvation
- Eating disorders
  - Avoidant/restrictive food intake disorder
