= Piazza (disambiguation) =

A piazza is a city square in Italy, Malta, along the Dalmatian coast and in surrounding regions.

Piazza may also refer to:

- Piazza (surname), Italian surname

== Places ==
- Piazza al Serchio, Italian comune in Lucca, Tuscany
- Piazza Armerina, Italian comune in Enna, Sicily
- Piazza Brembana, Italian comune Bergamo, Lombardy
- South Bank Piazza, Australian multi-purpose venue in Brisbane
- John Mackintosh Square, central town square in Gibraltar, colloquially known as The Piazza

== Other uses ==
- Isuzu Piazza, small sporty 3-door liftback coupé 1981–92
- Piazza (web service), a social Q&A web service for classrooms
- La Piazza, Italian folk music group

== See also ==
- The Piazza (disambiguation)
- Category:Piazzas in Italy
- ArtePiazza, a video game company of Japan
- Mike Piazza's Strike Zone, 1998 video game licensed by Major League Baseball
- Musica in piazza, 1936 Italian comedy film directed by Mario Mattoli
- The Light in the Piazza (novel), 1960, written by Elizabeth Spencer
- The Light in the Piazza (musical)
- The Light in the Piazza (film)
- The Piazza Tales (1856), a collection of short stories by Herman Melville
- L'Orchestra di Piazza Vittorio, Italian orchestra
