= Spiazzi =

Spiazzi may refer to:

- Amos Spiazzi, Italian general involeved in the Golpe Borghese
- Raimondo Spiazzi, Italian Catholic theologian
- Spiazzi (Gromo), human settlement in Gromo, Italy

== See also ==
- Piazzi
- Spiazzo
