= Dietary conservatism =

Reluctance to eat novel foods

Dietary conservatism is a foraging strategy in which individuals show a prolonged reluctance to eat novel foods, even after neophobia has been overcome. Within any given population of foragers, some will be conservative and some will be adventurous, an alternative strategy in which individuals readily accept novel food immediately after neophobia has waned. Dietary conservatism and neophobia are however distinct processes, distinguished by the persistence of an individual's reluctance to eat over repeated encounters with novel food and over long time periods.

== Background ==
Animals are often faced with a choice between eating familiar food or expanding their diet by consuming a novel item. It has long been recognised that animals hesitate to approach novel foods they encounter and this initial fear of novelty (the literal meaning of "neophobia") lasts only a matter of minutes in most animals. By contrast, a second response to novel food has been identified, in which, after the foragers have overcome their neophobia to approach and made contact with novel food, they continue to avoid eating it for considerable periods of time. This much longer avoidance of novel food is called dietary conservatism, and has a genetic basis. Unlike neophobia, DC does not rapidly subside over repeated encounters. For example, Kelly (2001) found that among wild birds, some individuals avoided novel food for more than 2 years and 200 exposures, even though the novel food was conspicuous and fully palatable.

== Prevalence ==
Dietary conservatism has been described in a range of vertebrate species including birds: Zebra Finch, Japanese quail, common blackbird, European robin, both in the wild and in captivity, domestic chicken, great tit and Eurasian blue tit, and fish: three-spined stickleback and four species of the guppy genus Poecilia. Dietary conservatism has never been demonstrated in humans, although the genetically influenced behaviour of "fussy eating" in children resembles the behaviour of non-human animals.

== Alternative foraging strategies ==
One observation about dietary conservatism is that each of the forager populations examined so far has included some individuals that are consistently conservative in diet. However, the rest of the population exhibit a clearly different response to foraging encounters with novel foods. "Adventurous consumers" eat novel food as soon as they encounter it, or after their neophobia has waned enough for them to approach and touch it. In all vertebrate populations tested so far, both adventurous consumption and dietary conservatism strategies have been represented by a sizable proportion of the population (typically between 10 and 50% in dietary conservatism).

== Plasticity in expression ==
Although dietary conservatism is a trait with a genetic basis, its expression is, like any behaviour, a dynamic interaction between genes and the environment. Specifically, the expression of DC has been shown to be influenced by an individual's experience of the encounter with novel food in different contexts. For example, extended experience with multiple different colours of novel food makes a conservative individual more likely to accept an additional novel colour. Conversely, encounters with novel food which is distasteful increase the strength of the dietary conservatism response, making the individual extremely averse to novel foods thereafter. Social cues can also be important. If a domestic chick (without direct access to food) observes another individual consuming novel food, then the avoidance of novel food by the observer is reduced. Alternatively, if chicks cannot see the food choice, and their companion is simply a competitor for food, then already-conservative individuals become more so, and only take the familiar food. The strength of expression of DC also depends on the forager's perceived risk of predation pressure, hunger levels, and perceived availability of food.

== Maintenance of DC and AC foraging strategies ==
The balance of foraging strategies in a population may be influenced by the forager's ecology. For example, dietary conservatism may be favoured in habitats where prey are relatively cryptic, since it allows the predator to specialise on a single prey type. In this way conservative individuals could benefit from the use of a ‘search image’ for that prey type and the accumulation of experience of handling that prey. In addition, where there are many toxic prey types, conservative foragers may be favoured as they are less likely to be poisoned if they eat only nontoxic prey, with which they are already familiar. By contrast, adventurous foragers may be favoured in environments with a high diversity of prey, but a low abundance of individual prey types. In such an environment, adventurous predators would more quickly discover which of the available range of prey are edible and would then be able to exploit all of those prey types, rather than a familiar, but smaller, subset.
