= The Piazza =

The Piazza may refer to:

- John Mackintosh Square in Gibraltar
- The first story in Melville's The Piazza Tales

== See also ==
- Piazza (disambiguation)
