= Selective eating =

Eating behavior in humans

Selective eating, also known as picky eating, is a variety of behaviors whereby a person is highly selective in what they do eat and what they do not eat. It is common in younger children, and can also sometimes be seen in adults.

There is no generally accepted definition of selective eating, which can make it difficult to study this behavior. Selective eating can be conceptualized as two separate constructs: picky eating and food neophobia. Picky eaters reject both novel and familiar food, whereas food neophobic people are thought to reject unfamiliar foods specifically. Selective eating can be associated with rejecting mixed or lumpy foods. It can also be associated with sensory sensitivity.

Estimates of the prevalence of selective eating vary due to measuring instruments, age of the sample, or population sample. However, studies suggest that feeding problems occur in about 80% of children with intellectual and developmental disabilities, and in about 25-45% of typically developing children. Consequently, a proportion of selective eaters may continue into adulthood with similar eating patterns as during childhood.

Selective eating in children is a common concern for parents, as it may lead to nutritional inadequacies and mealtime struggles. While many cases of selective eating tend to diminish with age, some individuals continue to exhibit discerning eating habits into adulthood, which can impact their overall health and wellbeing.

There is debate as to whether selective eating represents an eating disorder or is related to them. Some extreme forms of selective eating are recognized as psychiatric disorders, such as avoidant/restrictive food intake disorder (ARFID), or proposed psychological disorders, such as orthorexia nervosa.

== Causes and contributing factors ==
The etiology of selective eating is not well understood but can be broadly explained through nature and nurture. Nature typically refers to genetic predispositions, which play a significant role in the development of selective eating behaviors. The ability to taste certain bitter thiourea compounds, such as 6-n-propylthiouracil (PROP) and phenylthiocarbamide (PTC), is genetically determined. PROP tasters tend to have more food dislikes due to heightened sensitivity to bitter compounds. As a result, they’re at higher risk of developing selective eating patterns. Additionally, several studies provide evidence that food neophobia is highly heritable. A study conducted on over 5000 twin pairs and their parents found a neophobia heritability estimate of 0.78, although about 25% of phenotypic variation was accounted for by environmental factors.

Environmental influences during early life also shape selective eating behaviors. The impact of early experiences with flavor, both in utero and via breastfeeding, plays a crucial role in shaping food preferences later in life. Fetuses are exposed to the flavors present in the mother's diet through the amniotic fluid, leading to heightened preferences for those flavors postnatally. Breastfeeding further influences flavor preferences, as flavors from the mother's diet are transmitted through breast milk. Infants exposed to various flavors through breastfeeding demonstrate increased acceptance of those flavors during weaning. During weaning, the timing and variety of foods introduced influence children's readiness to consume new and varied foods. Parenting style and feeding practices further influence children's food behaviors. Cole et al’s (2017) systematic review cites several studies indicating that negative, non-responsive feeding styles are positively associated with selective eating. Across these studies, high warmth authoritative parenting was reported as being the most beneficial for implementing healthy eating habits. Lastly, the food environment at home, encompassing food availability and exposure to novel foods, significantly influences children’s food preferences and behaviors. Children exposed to a greater variety of foods at home tend to consume more fruits and vegetables. However, it’s important to note that some families will struggle to provide their children with varied healthy food options due to socioeconomic restrictions or food insecurity.

Ultimately, various factors interact to shape each child’s eating behaviours and food preferences. Early experiences including exposure to flavors in utero and via breast milk, interact with genetic differences in flavor perception to establish food preferences. Nurture elements such as exposure to different tastes and parental feeding practices can modify feeding behaviors. Conversely, a child's innate preferences, behaviors, and temperament can influence nurture elements. Research indicates that children who are sensitive to sensory stimuli may be less likely to model their parents' fruit and vegetable consumption, highlighting the bidirectional nature of picky eating. Further research is needed to fully understand the intricate interactions between these factors and their relation to selective eating.

== Implications ==
=== Family conflict ===
Selective eating often causes conflict within the family. Studies have reported impairment in family functioning with both moderate and severe selective eating. Parents of selective eaters commonly report that their children consume a restricted range of foods; require food prepared in particular ways; express strong preferences and aversions towards food and throw tantrums when these are denied. This often leads parents to providing meals for their children that are different from the rest of the family. Selective eating may also be a significant source of concern for parents as it may prompt physician visits and potentially spark conflict between parents regarding how to manage their child's eating behavior.

=== Physical health ===
Selective eating is characterised by a restricted diet. Restricted diet can have a concerning impact on growth and development. Studies show it is associated with poor physical health through nutritional deficiencies including low intakes of iron and zinc as these are associated with low intakes of fruit, vegetables, and meat. Also, lower intakes of vitamin C, vitamin E, folate, and fiber has been noted, which may lead to a weakened immune response and digestive problems.

Studies have shown mixed findings regarding the relationship between selective eating and being at risk of being underweight or overweight. A 1997 study of a group of selective eaters (aged 4–14) found that "a significant minority has poor growth or weight gain." Yet, this observation could be attributed to their broadened interpretation of selective eating and the inclusion of much younger children. There remains little evidence for a consistent effect of being a selective eater on growth trajectories. Further research is needed to investigate the effects of selective eating on brain development and metabolism.

=== Psychosocial symptoms ===
Selective eating is linked to eating psychopathology and psychosocial dysfunction. This includes both internalizing (e.g., anxiety, depression) and externalizing (e.g., attention deficit hyperactivity disorder) psychopathology. Both moderate and severe levels of selective eating are associated with psychopathological symptoms, and the severity of these symptoms tends to worsen with more severe selective eating.

Selective eaters tend to show social avoidance, although it's unclear whether this is a result of selective eating behavior or simply reflects a primary social skills deficit. The extent of social avoidance varies, but one case study of a 9-year-old boy identifies the impact of selective eating specifically. He found it difficult to make friends because he missed lunch at school. His selective eating also stymied his family's vacation plans and contributed to household tensions.

== Diagnosis ==
Assessment of selective eating varies due to the lack of universal definition. Considering the complex etiology of selective eating, assessment (and later treatment) ideally should be carried out by an interdisciplinary team of professionals.

One of the most common ways of measuring selective eating is using scales. Selective eating can be measured with a list heuristic, where the number of foods that the person rejects on a standard list is counted. When investigating selective eating in children, parental report tends to be the most common tool of measurement. Two commonly used questionnaires include the Child Eating Behavior Questionnaire Food Fussiness subscale (CEBQ FF) and the Food Neophobia Scale (FNS). These questionnaires have undergone validation against weight-for-age-z score or child body mass index z-score (BMIz), with greater selective eating being negatively correlated with BMIz or weight-for-age z-score. However, a limitation of such scales is that they either rely on individuals to self-identify as selective eaters or rely on parental report which may be biased. Parents may struggle to accurately gauge the extent to which their child's eating habits differ from typical behavior for children, or they may find that their perception of their child's eating behavior is influenced by their own concerns regarding eating and feeding habits.

Therefore, it can be helpful to validate selective eating scales against observational measures. There are a range of ways to conduct observational assessments of selective eating behavior. One study tested participants individually and told them that they were participating in a study of the relation between mood and taste perception. They were presented with various types of cookies and asked to rate them along various dimensions and told to eat as many as they wanted as fresh cookies would be baked for each participant. Following the taste test, participants completed a packet of surveys including dietary restraint scales as well as distractor scales (e.g. mood measures). Each of the plates was weighed before and after participant arrival to provide an unobtrusive measure of total caloric intake.

Extreme forms of selective eating have been recognized as eating disorders, mainly avoidant/restrictive food intake disorder (ARFID). These should be assessed through diagnosis. The DSM-5 includes a 'feeding and eating disorders' section and covers several diagnoses that may be related to selective eating.

== See also ==
- Dietary conservatism, the prolonged reluctance to eat novel foods, a foraging strategy observed in animals
