= Neophobia =

- Pronunciation: /niːəˈfoʊbiə/
- Specialty: Psychiatry, clinical psychology
- Symptoms: Physically, psychologically, behaviorally

Neophobia is the fear of anything new. In its milder form, it can manifest as the unwillingness to try new things or break from routine. In the context of human children, the term is generally used to indicate a tendency to reject unknown or novel foods. Food neophobia, as it may be referred to, is an important concern in pediatric psychology.

In biomedical research, neophobia is often associated with the study of taste, with research examining parts of the brain involved and cellular and molecular factors that can affect an animal's willingness to taste new foods. In ecological research, neophobia is seen as a trait that can be both helpful and harmful, where neophobia can protect wild animals from novel dangers, but also prevent them from accessing novel resources.

== Terminology ==
The word neophobia comes from the Greek νέος, neos, meaning "new, young", and φόβος, phobos, for "fear". Cainophobia comes from the Greek καινός, kainos, meaning "new, fresh". Alternative terms for neophobia include metathesiophobia, prosophobia, cainotophobia (or cainophobia), and kainophobia (or kainolophobia).

== Examples ==
Norway rats and house mice are thought to have evolved increased levels of neophobia as they became commensal with humans because humans were routinely devising new methods (e.g., mousetraps) to eradicate them.

Neophobia is also a common finding in aging animals, although apathy could also explain, or contribute to explain, the lack of exploratory drive systematically observed in aging. Researchers argued that the lack of exploratory drive was likely due neurophysiologically to the dysfunction of neural pathways connected to the prefrontal cortex observed during aging.

Robert Anton Wilson theorized in his book Prometheus Rising that neophobia is instinctual in people after they begin to raise children. Wilson's views on neophobia are mostly negative, believing that it is the reason human culture and ideas do not advance as quickly as our technology. His model includes an idea from Thomas Kuhn's The Structure of Scientific Revolutions, which is that new ideas, however well proven and evident, are implemented only when the generations who consider them "new" die and are replaced by generations who consider the ideas accepted and old.

== Food neophobia ==
Food neophobia in humans has been described as the fear of eating new or unfamiliar foods. It is a common symptom of avoidant/restrictive food intake disorder but is not in itself a disorder. Food neophobia is particularly common in toddlers and young children. It is often related to an individual's level of sensation-seeking, meaning a person's willingness to try new things and take risks. Not only do people with high food neophobia resist trying new food, they also rate new foods that they do try as lower than neophilics. Picky eating has been a cause of concern for many parents of young children. This results in leaving parents feeling frustrated, and risk compounding parental anxieties. Parents tend to worry about the growth and lack of nutrient in their child. Pediatricians and family physicians may aid parents and care givers in suggesting different ways to feed their children effectively.

It is very typical for people to generally have a fear of new things and to prefer things that are familiar and common. Most people experience food neophobia to a certain extent, though some people are more neophobic than others. A measure of individual differences in food neophobia is the Food Neophobia Scale (FNS), which consists of a 10-item survey that requires self-reported responses on a seven-point Likert scale. There is also a separate scale geared towards children called the Food Neophobia Scale for Children (FNSC), in which the parents actually do the reporting for the survey.

In animals it has been shown that food neophobia is a fear of novelty lasting only a short duration (minutes at most), which is distinct from dietary conservatism, the prolonged refusal to add a novel food to the diet, which can last many days or even years. Dietary conservatism has never yet been demonstrated in humans, although the genetically influenced behaviour of "fussy eating" in children resembles the behaviour seen in animals.

Food neophobia relates to the omnivore's dilemma, a phenomenon that explains the choice that omnivores, and humans in particular, have between eating a new food and risking danger or avoiding it and potentially missing out on a valuable food source. Having at least some degree of food neophobia has been noted to be evolutionarily advantageous as it can help people to avoid eating potentially poisonous foods.

=== Causes ===
Genetics seem to play a role in both food neophobia and general neophobia. Research shows that about two-thirds of the variation in food neophobia is due to genetics. A study done on twin pairs showed an even higher correlation, indicating that genetics do play a factor in food neophobia.

Psychosocial factors can also increase a child's chances of developing food neophobia. Young children carefully watch parental food preferences, and this may produce neophobic tendencies with regard to eating if parents tend to avoid some foods.

Another cause includes being more sensitive than average to bitter tastes, which may be associated with a significant history of middle ear infection or an increased perception of bitter foods, known as a supertaster.

=== Treatment ===
Some efforts to address this situation, such as pressuring the child to eat a disliked food or threatening punishment for not eating it, tend to exacerbate the problem.

Effective solutions include offering non-food rewards, such as a small sticker, for tasting a new or disliked food, and for parents to model the behavior they want to see by cheerfully eating the new or disliked foods in front of the children.

Exposing someone to a new food increases the chances of liking that food item. However, it is not enough to merely look at a new food. Novel food must be repeatedly tasted in order to increase preference for eating it. It can take as many as 15 tries of a novel food item before a child accepts it. There also appears to be a critical period for lowering later food neophobia in children during the weaning process. The variety of solid foods first exposed to children can lower later food refusal. Some researchers believe that even the food variety of a nursing mother and the consequent variety of flavors in her breastmilk can lead to greater acceptance of novel food items later on in life. Food neophobia does tend to naturally decrease as people age.

== See also ==
- List of phobias
- Culture shock
- Cognitive ethology
- Habituation
- Neophilia
- Phobia
- Progress trap
- Specific phobia
- Stranger anxiety
