= Lagrange (crater) =

Crater on the Moon

- Coordinates: 32.3°S 72.8°W
- Diameter: 225 km
- Depth: 2.7 km
- Colongitude: 75° at sunrise
- Eponym: Joseph L. Lagrange

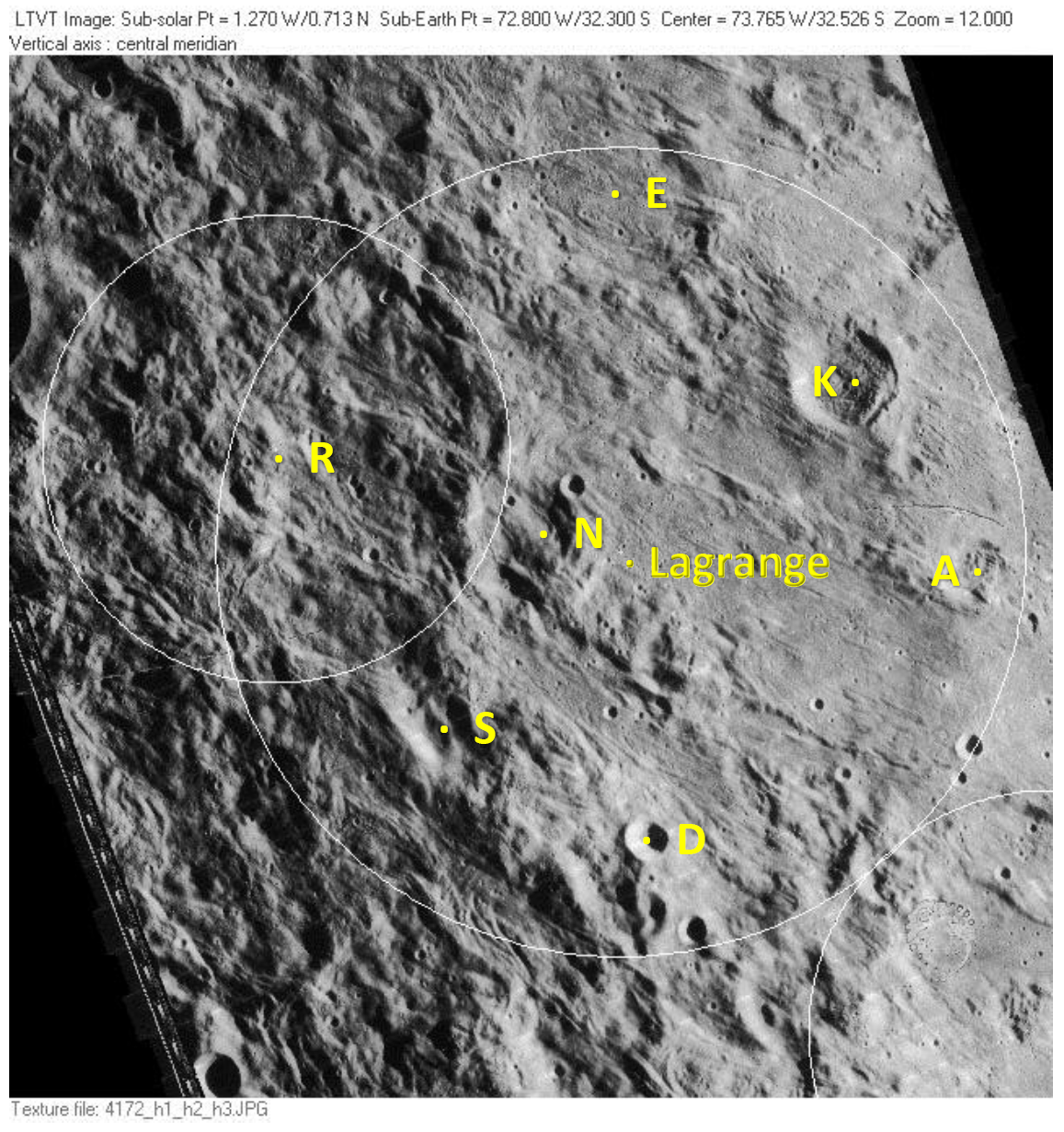
Lagrange

Lagrange is a lunar impact crater that is attached to the northwestern rim of the crater Piazzi. It lies near the southwestern limb of the Moon, and the appearance is oblong due to foreshortening. To the northwest of this feature is the Montes Cordillera, a ring-shaped mountain range that surrounds the immense Mare Orientale impact basin.

The southwestern half of this walled plain has been heavily damaged by the mass of ejecta from Mare Orientale. This material forms an irregular striation in the surface that is radial to the Mare Orientale basin. As a result, only the northeast part of the crater is somewhat intact; the remainder just forms an uneven depression in the surface that is covered in long ridges and gouges. The most notable feature in this section is the small bowl-shaped crater Lagrange D.

The surviving section of the rim is worn and eroded, forming an arc-shaped range of low ridges in the surface. The interior floor in this section is relatively level, but even this surface contains traces of the Mare Orientale ejecta.

== Satellite craters ==
By convention these features are identified on lunar maps by placing the letter on the side of the crater midpoint that is closest to Lagrange.

Lagrange	Latitude	Longitude	Diameter
A	32.5° S	69.2° W	6 km
B	31.4° S	61.5° W	16 km
C	29.8° S	64.9° W	23 km
D	34.9° S	72.5° W	11 km
E	29.1° S	72.6° W	46 km
F	32.8° S	67.4° W	14 km
G	28.5° S	62.7° W	18 km
H	29.5° S	66.2° W	11 km
J	34.0° S	68.9° W	8 km
K	30.7° S	70.3° W	31 km
L	32.1° S	65.1° W	18 km
N	32.1° S	73.8° W	31 km
R	31.3° S	76.5° W	130 km
S	33.9° S	74.6° W	12 km
T	33.0° S	62.6° W	12 km
W	33.0° S	63.7° W	56 km
X	28.7° S	69.2° W	9 km
Y	28.2° S	68.4° W	16 km
Z	32.6° S	64.6° W	13 km

Lagrange T is a concentric (double-walled) crater.
