= Costantino Corti =

Italian sculptor

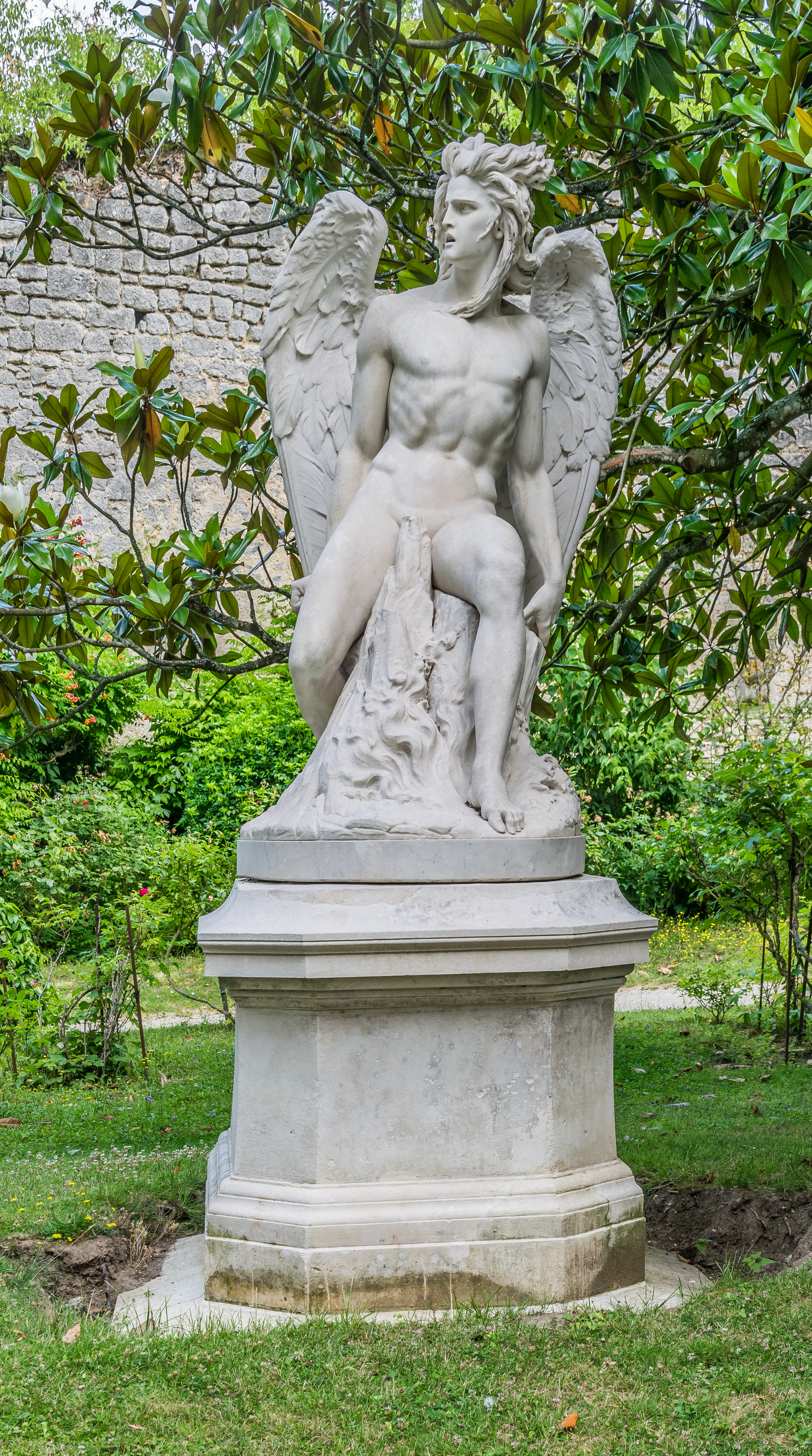
Engraving of the colossal statue Lucifer by Costantino Corti

Costantino Corti (1823/1824–1873) was a Milanese sculptor who exhibited at Brera, Florence, London, and Paris. Corti was most noted for his colossal statue Lucifer. He also produced statues commemorating Federico Borromeo, Conrad of Swabia, and the astronomer Giuseppe Piazzi.

== Works ==
Corti's marble Lucifer (sometimes titled as Satan) was commissioned by the Count d'Aquila, brother of the former king of Naples. At the end of the 19th century, a traveller and amateur critic offered this assessment of the work:

Corti makes no vulgar Satan with horns, hoofs, and tail, the superlatively ugly monster of medievalism, but a veritable fallen Son of the Morning; majestic in form, strong of limb, determined of will, supernal in figure, but sinister of aspect: a being enveloped in doubt, despair, and guilt; sufficiently attractive in mien to cast a spell over men or draw their sinful yearnings toward his by force of congenial sympathy.

Lucifer was reviewed by Francesco dall'Ongaro at rhapsodic length as a worthy representation of the Satanic ideal shared in the literary works of John Milton or Lord Byron. Dall' Ongaro found the figure "androgynous," in keeping with the theological view that gender came into existence only with the creation of human beings and was not a characteristic of angels. The sculpture received notice for its "extraordinary vigour."

Corti's monument to Cardinal Borromeo was commissioned in 1861 for the plaza of the Biblioteca Ambrosiana. The statue was completed in 1864 and dedicated the following year. The statue of Giuseppe Piazzi, dedicated in 1871, is located in the main plaza of Ponte in Valtellina, the astronomer's birthplace.

== Sources ==
- Clement, Clara Erskine, and Laurence Hutton. Artists of the Nineteenth Century and Their Works: A Handbook. Houghton, Mifflin, 1889, 5th ed., vol. 1, p. 162 online.
- Corna, Andrea. Dizionario della storia dell'arte in Italia. C. & C. Tarantola, 1915, p. 196.
- Thieme, Ulrich. Allgemeines Lexikon der bildenden Künstler von der Antike bis zur Gegenwart. Leipzig, 1912, vol. 7, p. 485 online.
