= Cathleen Piazza =

Feeding disorders researcher

Cathleen C. Piazza is a researcher specializing in the assessment and treatment of pediatric feeding disorders. Her work has been foundational to modern research, assessment, and treatment methodologies in this field. Currently, she serves as the director of the pediatric feeding disorders program at the Munroe-Meyer Institute at the University of Nebraska Medical Center.

== Career ==
Piazza earned her doctorate from Tulane University and completed her pre-doctoral internship and post-doctoral fellowship at the Kennedy Krieger Institute and Johns Hopkins University School of Medicine. At Kennedy Krieger, she held multiple roles including chief psychologist of the neurobehavioral unit, director of training, and director of pediatric feeding disorders before directing the pediatric feeding disorders program at the Marcus Autism Center of Children's Healthcare of Atlanta.

Piazza later moved to the Munroe-Meyer Institute at UNMC, where she continued her research focused on feeding disorder assessment and treatment, and the interaction between physiological and behavioral causes of feeding disorders. Throughout her career, she has supervised numerous interns and fellows who have made significant contributions to the field of applied behavior analysis and feeding disorders.

Piazza has also served as the past president of the Society for the Experimental Analysis of Behavior and former editor, associate editor, and book editor of the Journal of Applied Behavior Analysis.

== Awards and honors ==
- Association for Behavior Analysis International: Fellow
- American Psychological Association Division 25: Nathan H. Azrin Distinguished Contribution to Applied Behavior Analysis
- Association for Behavior Analysis International: Outstanding Mentor Award
- Crohn's and Colitis Association: Woman of Distinction (2002)
- Atlanta Business Chronicle: Health Care Hero Finalist (2001)

== Selected works ==
- Piazza, C. C., Fisher, W. W., Brown, K. A., Shore, B. A., Patel, M. R., Katz, R. M., Sevin, B. M., Gulotta, C. S., & Blakely-Smith, A. (2003). Functional analysis of inappropriate mealtime behaviors. Journal of applied behavior analysis, 36(2), 187–204. https://doi.org/10.1901/jaba.2003.36-187
- Volkert, V. M., & Piazza, C. C. (2012). Pediatric feeding disorders. In P. Sturmey & M. Hersen (Eds.), Handbook of evidence-based practice in clinical psychology, Vol. 1. Child and adolescent disorders (pp. 323–337). John Wiley & Sons, Inc. https://doi.org/10.1002/9781118156391.ebcp001013
- Piazza C. C. (2008). Feeding disorders and behavior: What have we learned?. Developmental Disabilities Research Reviews, 14(2), 174–181. https://doi.org/10.1002/ddrr.22
