= 1002 Olbersia =

Main-belt asteroid

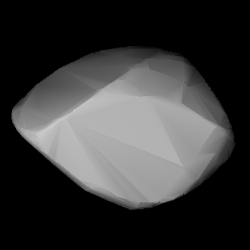
- Modelled shape of Olbersia from its lightcurve

Discovery
- Discovered by: V. Albitzkij
- Discovery site: Simeiz Obs.
- Discovery date: 15 August 1923

Designations
- Named after: Heinrich Olbers (German astronomer)
- Alternative designations: 1923 OB · 1956 UR; A923 PJ
- Minor planet category: main-belt · (middle); background

Orbital characteristics
- Epoch 31 May 2020 (JD 2459000.5)
- Uncertainty parameter 0
- Observation arc: 84.98 yr (31,039 d)
- Aphelion: 3.2177 AU
- Perihelion: 2.3543 AU
- Semi-major axis: 2.7860 AU
- Eccentricity: 0.1549
- Orbital period (sidereal): 4.65 yr (1,699 d)
- Mean anomaly: 276.82°
- Mean motion: 0° 12^{m} 42.84^{s} / day
- Inclination: 10.770°
- Longitude of ascending node: 343.74°
- Argument of perihelion: 355.29°

Physical characteristics
- Mean diameter: 22.938±0.154 km; 24.31±0.36 km; 32.13±2.3 km
- Synodic rotation period: 10.244±0.005 h
- Pole ecliptic latitude: (220.0°, 35.0°) (λ_{1}/β_{1}); (16.0°, 54.0°) (λ_{2}/β_{2})
- Geometric albedo: 0.0621±0.010; 0.110±0.004; 0.147±0.020
- Spectral type: C
- Absolute magnitude (H): 10.9; 11.1

1002 Olbersia (prov. designation: A923 PJ or 1923 OB) is a background asteroid from the central regions of the asteroid belt. It was discovered on 15 August 1923, by Russian astronomer Vladimir Albitsky at the Simeiz Observatory on the Crimean peninsula. The assumed C-type asteroid has a rotation period of 10.2 hours and measures approximately 24 kilometers (15 miles) in diameter. It was named after German astronomer Heinrich Olbers (1758–1840).

== Orbit and classification ==
Olbersia is a non-family asteroid from the main belt's background population. It orbits the Sun in the central asteroid belt at a distance of 2.4–3.2 AU once every 4 years and 8 months (1,699 days; semi-major axis of 2.79 AU). Its orbit has an eccentricity of 0.15 and an inclination of 11° with respect to the ecliptic. The asteroid's observation arc begins at Uccle Observatory in 1935, twelve years after its official discovery observation at Simeiz.

== Naming ==
Honoring Olbers

This minor planet was named after Heinrich Olbers (1758–1840), a physician and amateur astronomer from Bremen in northern Germany. He discovered the main-belt asteroids 2 Pallas and 4 Vesta as well as six comets, and was the first to compute the orbit of comets with a certain degree of accuracy. Olbers' paradox is named after him, as is the lunar crater Olbers. The official naming citation was published by Paul Herget in The Names of the Minor Planets in 1955 (H 96).

The road to 1000

1001 Gaussia was named as part of trio honoring the events surrounding the discovery of Ceres in 1801. Carl Friedrich Gauss who computed the orbit of Ceres had 1001 Gaussia named for him, 1000 Piazzia for Giuseppe Piazzi (who had discovered Ceres) and finally 1002 Olbersia for Olbers. Olbers recovered Ceres after it has passed behind the Sun and returned. In the next few years only three more astronomical bodies were found between Mars and Jupiter, Pallas, Juno, and 4 Vesta, and it would be 37 years before another asteroid was found, 5 Astraea in 1845. Olbers discovered Pallas and Vesta also. No asteroids were found in 1846, planet Neptune was, but after that more asteroids were found every year including over 300 by the 1890s, when the advent of astronomical photography further increased the rate of discovery in coming decades. In the years between 1845 and 1891, 6.9 minor planets were discovered each year, but the rate went to 24.8 from 1891 to 1931. In that time an additional 1191 asteroids were discovered, and the number of numbered minor planets reached well over 1000. The 1000th asteroid was approved in 1921, and the ten thousandth in 1989.

== Physical characteristics ==
Olbersia is an assumed C-type asteroid. This is one of the common asteroid types, as of the late 1980s, 75% of known asteroids.

=== Rotation period and poles ===
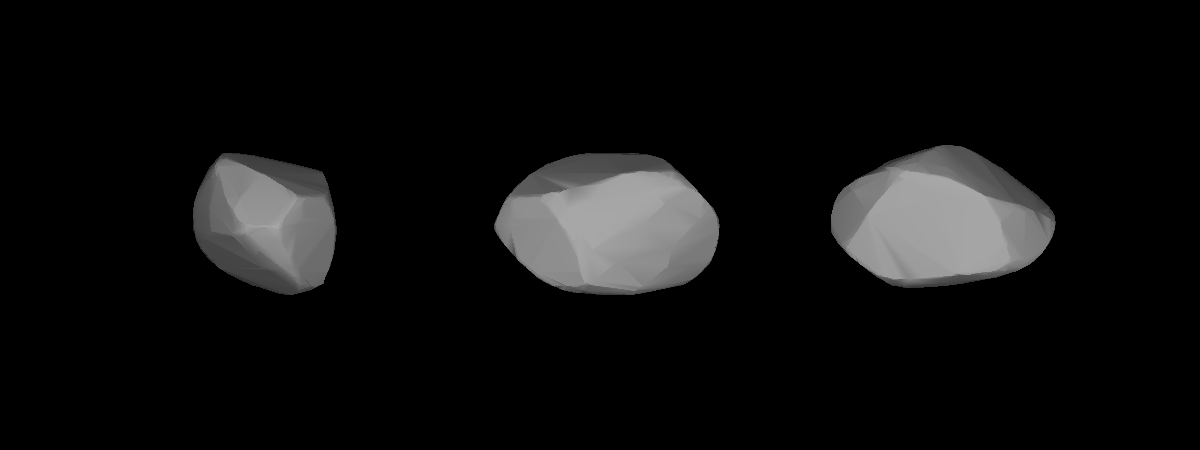
Lightcurve-based 3D-model of Olbersia

In October 2007, a rotational lightcurve of Olbersia was obtained from photometric observations by French amateur astronomer Pierre Antonini. Lightcurve analysis gave a well-defined rotation period of 10.244±0.005 hours with a brightness variation of 0.38 magnitude (U=3).

In 2011, a modeled lightcurve using data from the Uppsala Asteroid Photometric Catalogue (UAPC) and other sources gave a concurring period 10.2367 hours, as well as two spin axis of (220.0°, 35.0°) and (16.0°, 54.0°) in ecliptic coordinates (λ, β) (Q=2).

=== Diameter and albedo ===
According to the surveys carried out by the Infrared Astronomical Satellite IRAS, the Japanese Akari satellite, and NASA's Wide-field Infrared Survey Explorer with its subsequent NEOWISE mission, Olbersia measures between 22.938 and 32.13 kilometers in diameter and its surface has an albedo between 0.0621 and 0.147. The Collaborative Asteroid Lightcurve Link derives an albedo of 0.0743 and a diameter of 32.21 kilometers based on an absolute magnitude of 10.9.

== See also ==
- List of minor planets: 1–1000
- List of minor planets: 1001–2000
