= Feeding disorder =

Child's abnormal refusal to eat certain foods

A feeding disorder in infancy or early childhood is a child's refusal to eat certain food groups, textures, solids, or liquids for a period of at least one month, which results in inadequate weight gain, impaired growth, or developmental delays. Feeding disorders resemble failure to thrive, except that, at times, there is no medical or physiological condition that can explain the very small amount of food the child consumes or the child’s lack of growth. Sometimes, a previous medical condition that has been resolved is causing the issue.

== Types ==
Feeding disorder is divided into six further sub-types:

1. Feeding disorder of state regulation
2. Feeding disorder of reciprocity (neglect)
3. Infantile anorexia
4. Sensory food aversion
5. Feeding disorder associated with concurrent medical condition
6. Post-traumatic feeding disorder

== Symptoms and signs ==
Children attempting to swallow different food textures often vomit, gag, or choke while eating. At feeding times they may react negatively to attempts to feed them, and refuse to eat. Other symptoms include head turns, crying, difficulty in chewing or vomiting, and spitting whilst eating. Many children may have feeding difficulties and may be picky eaters, but most of them still have a fairly healthy diet. Children with a feeding disorder, however, will completely abandon some of the food groups, textures, or liquids that are necessary for human growth and development

Children with this disorder can develop more slowly due to their lack of nutritional intake. In severe cases the child can seem to feel socially isolated because of their lack of social activities involving foods.

=== Associated problems ===
A few of the medical and psychological conditions that have been known to be associated with this disorder include:

- Gastrointestinal motility disorders
- Oral-motor dysfunction
- Failure to thrive
- Prematurity
- Food allergies
- Sensory problems
- Reflux
- Feeding tube placement

A child that is suffering from malnutrition can have permanently stunted mental and physical development. Getting treatment early is essential and can prevent many of the complications. They can also develop further eating disorders later in life such as anorexia nervosa, or they could become a limited eater—though they could still be a healthy child they may become a picky eater.

== Diagnosis ==
A barium swallow test is often performed, where the child is given a liquid or food with barium in it. This allows the consulting medical practitioners to trace the swallow-function on an X-ray or other investigative system such as a CAT scan. An endoscopic assignment test can also be performed, where an endoscope is used to view the oesophagus and throat on a screen. It can also allow viewing of how the patient will react during feeding.

== Treatments ==
There is no quick cure, and treatment will be based on what problems may be causing the feeding disorder. Depending on the condition, the following steps can be taken: increasing the number of foods that are accepted, increasing the amount of calories and the amount of fluids; checks for vitamin or mineral deficiencies; finding out what the illnesses or psychosocial problems are. To accomplish these goals patients may have to be hospitalized for extensive periods of time. Treatment involves professionals from multiple fields of study including, but not limited to; behavior analysts (Behavioral interventions), occupational and speech therapist who specialize in feeding disorders, dietitians, psychologists and physicians. To obtain the best results, treatment should include a behavior modification plan under the guidance of multiple professionals. If the child has oral motor difficulties related to the feeding disorder a pediatric occupational or speech therapist who is trained in feeding disorders and oral motor function should help develop a plan.

== Epidemiology ==
Some 25% to 40% of young children are reported to have feeding problems—mainly colic, vomiting, slow feeding, and refusal to eat. It has been reported that up to 80% of infants with developmental handicaps also demonstrate feeding problems while 1 to 2% of infants aged less than one year show severe food refusal and poor growth. Among infants born prematurely, 40% to 70% experience some form of feeding problem.

== See also ==
- Avoidant/restrictive food intake disorder
- Eating disorder
