= Piazzi (crater) =

Lunar impact crater

- Coordinates: 36.2°S 67.9°W
- Diameter: 101 km
- Depth: 2.3 km
- Colongitude: 70° at sunrise
- Eponym: Giuseppe Piazzi

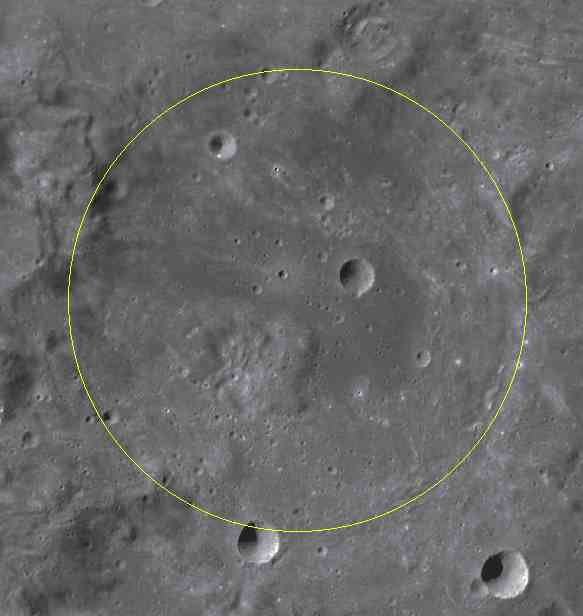
This is probably an aerial view for Piazzi.

Piazzi is an impact crater that is located near the southwestern limb of the Moon, and is attached to the southeastern rim of the walled plain called Lagrange. About three crater diameters to the south is the crater Inghirami. Piazzi is seen at an oblique angle from the Earth, and it appears oblong due to foreshortening.

As with Lagrange, this formation has been heavily modified by the ejecta from the formation of the Mare Orientale impact basin to the northwest. This material has formed radial valleys and ridges across the surface of these craters. The interior floor of Piazzi has dark patches of low albedo along the northeastern rim. The outer rim of the crater is irregular and eroded, and a few small craters lie within the uneven interior.

== Satellite craters ==
By convention these features are identified on lunar maps by placing the letter on the side of the crater midpoint that is closest to Piazzi.

Piazzi	Latitude	Longitude	Diameter
A	39.5° S	66.7° W	13 km
B	37.5° S	66.2° W	8 km
C	37.1° S	62.6° W	28 km
F	35.7° S	61.1° W	11 km
G	40.2° S	64.6° W	10 km
H	40.2° S	65.7° W	8 km
K	37.5° S	68.0° W	8 km
M	35.9° S	67.4° W	6 km
N	35.4° S	66.0° W	16 km
P	38.8° S	67.3° W	20 km

== See also ==
- 1000 Piazzia, asteroid
