= Piazza (web service) =

Education question and answer platform

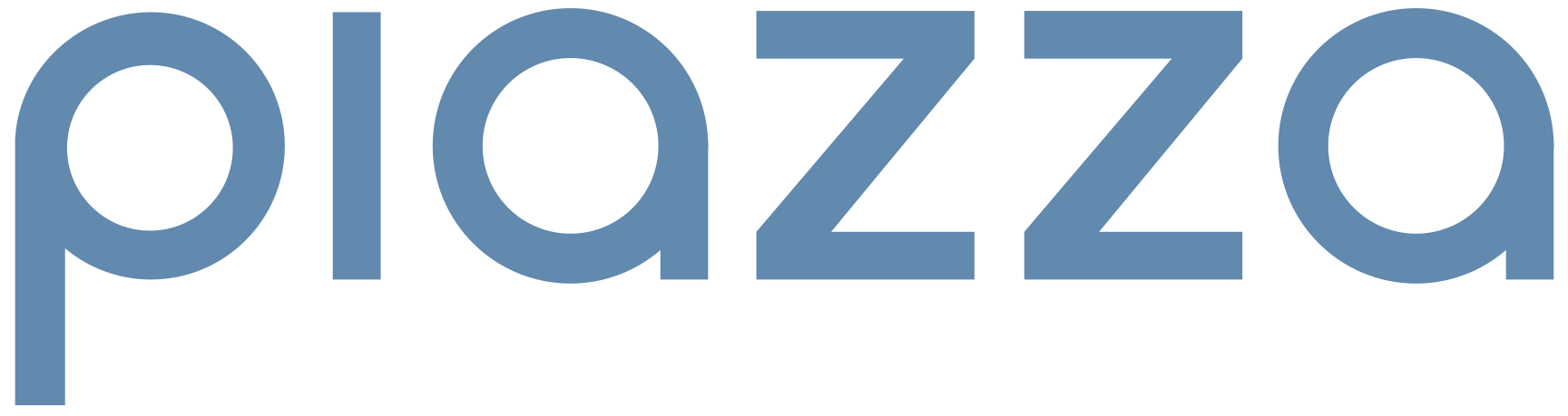
- Type: Private
- Industry: Education, SaaS
- Founded: 2009
- Headquarters: Palo Alto, CA
- Key people: Pooja Nath, CEO and Founder
- Website: http://www.piazza.com/

Piazza is a learning management system created by Pooja Nath in 2009. The site is designed in a forum-type format which is moderated by instructors. The company is headquartered in Palo Alto, California. It is named for the Italian word "piazza", which means town square.

== History ==
Pooja Nath created the first prototype of Piazza in 2009 during her first year at Stanford Graduate School of Business. By February 2010, Piazza was used by approximately 600 Stanford students. In January 2011, Piazza opened to all institutions, reaching over 330 schools and tens of thousands of students by the summer of the same year.

While the service originally operated under the name 'Piazzza', in June 2011, the third 'z' was dropped from Piazza's name.

== Overview ==
Users can publicly ask and answer questions, and post notes. Instructors also have the ability to allow students to post anonymously. Each question prompts a collective answer to which any user can contribute and an instructor answer, shown directly below, which can only be edited by instructors. Multiple students are allowed to contribute to each answer like Wikipedia entries, and each answer has a version history that shows what each student wrote. Users are allowed to attach external files to posts, use LaTeX formatting, view a post's edit history, add follow-up questions, and receive email notifications when new content is added. The interface consists of a dynamic list of posts on the left side of the screen, a central panel for viewing and contributing to individual posts, and an upper bar for account control. According to the company's data, the response time on Piazza averages approximately 14 minutes.

Individual Piazza classes are self-contained and can be locked with an access code. Anyone may create a class, but the head instructor retains full control over the class content, along with administrative abilities such as endorsing good answers and viewing more detailed statistics on class activity.

In November 2011, Piazza launched iOS and Android mobile apps which allow students to share their ideas and get their queries answered.
