= Avoidant/restrictive food intake disorder =

Feeding or eating disorder

- Specialty: Psychiatry
- Symptoms: Aversion towards eating, hypersensitivity to food taste or texture, fear of trying new foods, weight loss, low appetite
- Complications: Malnutrition, allergies, food neophobia, being underweight
- Duration: Chronic
- Risk factors: Autism, obsessive–compulsive disorder, anxiety disorders, negative experiences from eating (e.g., choking, nausea from eating)

Avoidant/restrictive food intake disorder (ARFID) is a feeding or eating disorder in which individuals significantly limit the volume or variety of foods they consume, causing malnutrition, weight loss, or psychosocial problems. Unlike some eating disorders, such as anorexia nervosa and bulimia nervosa, body image disturbance is not a root cause of ARFID. Individuals with ARFID may have trouble eating due to the sensory characteristics of food (e.g., appearance, smell, texture, or taste), executive dysfunction, emetophobia (fear of vomiting), fear of choking, low appetite, or a combination of these factors. While ARFID is most often associated with low weight, ARFID occurs across the entire weight spectrum.

ARFID was first included as a diagnosis in the fifth edition of the Diagnostic and Statistical Manual of Mental Disorders (DSM-5) published in 2013, extending and replacing the diagnosis of feeding disorder of infancy or early childhood included in prior editions. It was subsequently also included in the eleventh revision of the International Classification of Diseases (ICD-11) published in 2022.

== Signs and symptoms ==
Avoidant/restrictive food intake disorder is not simply "picky eating" commonly seen in toddlers and young children, which usually resolves on its own. In ARFID, the behaviors are so severe that they lead to nutritional deficiencies, poor weight gain (or significant weight loss), and significant interference with "psychosocial functioning."

ARFID comprises a range of selective and restrictive eating behaviors. In some cases, ARFID presents as extreme "picky eating," often due to sensory sensitivities or a fear of aversive consequences. In other cases, ARFID subjects may eat a variety of foods but, due to lack of interest or low appetite, not eat enough to meet growth or nutritional needs. People with ARFID may also be afraid of trying new foods, a fear known as food neophobia. For some people with ARFID, multiple reasons for undereating apply.

Sensory issues with food are among the most common reasons. For example, people who experience the taste of fruits or vegetables as intensely bitter might avoid eating them. For others, the smell, texture, appearance, color, or temperature of certain foods is unbearable. Sensory sensitivities can also lead people to refuse eating foods from specific brands. A diet limited to certain foods, particularly highly processed foods, can lead to nutritional deficiencies. Food avoidance due to sensory issues often develops in early childhood and is long-lasting.

People might also avoid certain foods or restrict the amount of food they eat out of fear of negative consequences such as choking, vomiting, or stomach aches. In many cases, this behavior is motivated by a previous traumatic experience related to food. While avoiding the associated foods can provide relief in the short term, over time avoidance can exacerbate anxiety, depriving someone of the opportunity to make corrective, positive experiences. Further, the range of avoided foods can grow over time, expanding to encompassing all solid foods in extreme cases.

A lack of appetite or interest in food is a third common reason to avoid or restrict food intake. ARFID patients may perceive eating as a chore. Within this group, a low body weight or failure to thrive are common and the experienced lack of interest is long-lasting.

Restriction of food intake due to unavailability, such as in situations of food insecurity, or dietary restrictions due to cultural practices such as religious fasting or dieting are not included in ARFID. Likewise, restricted eating and avoiding food out of concern for body weight or shape, as is typical for anorexia nervosa and bulimia nervosa, do not fall under ARFID.

=== Associated conditions ===
According to a 2022 Harvard study of ARFID, "More than half of individuals with ARFID also have other neurodevelopmental, psychiatric, or somatic diagnoses. Anxiety, depression, sleep disorders, and learning difficulties are particularly common co-occurring issues."

==== Autism ====
A 2023 review concluded that "there is considerable overlap between ARFID and autism," finding that 8–55% of children diagnosed with ARFID were autistic.

Autistic children are more likely than other children to have atypical eating behaviors and eating disorders. The most common symptom seen in patients with both autism and ARFID is sensory-based avoidance; however, fear-based restriction and lack of interest in food are prevalent in this population as well.

==== Anxiety disorder ====
Anxiety disorders are the most common comorbidity with ARFID. 36–72% of people struggling with ARFID also have a diagnosed anxiety disorder. Specific food avoidances could be caused by food phobias that cause great anxiety when a person is presented with new or feared foods. Most eating disorders are related to a fear of gaining weight. Those who have ARFID do not have this fear, but the psychological symptoms and anxiety created are similar. Some people with ARFID have fears such as emetophobia (fear of vomiting) or a fear of choking.

==== Anorexia nervosa ====
Anorexia nervosa is distinguished from ARFID by the fact that body image or weight concerns motivate food restriction. However, the distinction between the two disorders is not always clear and there can be overlap. A person with anorexia nervosa, for example, may initially restrict food intake due to body concerns, but, over time, get over those concerns yet still undereat due to nausea and anxiety around food, fitting ARFID's low-appetite presentation. Alternately, an adolescent may at first restrict intake due to severe sensory processing issues, often seen in ARFID, and later develop body image concerns. In the 1940s, the seminal Minnesota Starvation Experiment demonstrated that the effects of starvation – whatever the cause – can result in a variety of eating disorder behaviors, further suggesting overlap between different eating disorders.

Family-based therapy (FBT), initially developed to treat anorexia nervosa, is also used to treat children and teens with ARFID.

==== Attention deficit hyperactivity disorder ====
Those with attention deficit hyperactivity disorder (ADHD) often struggle with inattentiveness or distraction, which may lead to missing meals or forgetting to eat for long periods of time. Additionally, people with ADHD are more likely than the general population to struggle with mood disorders, such as anxiety and depression, which have a strong link with ARFID. Medication used to treat ADHD, such as stimulants, often suppress appetite, which can make eating disorder treatment more difficult.

==== Pediatric acute-onset neuropsychiatric syndrome ====
Pediatric acute-onset neuropsychiatric syndrome (PANS) is characterized by a sudden onset of obsessive–compulsive symptoms or severely restricted food intake. According to the PANS/PANDAS Physicians Network, PANS may also be a subset of ARFID.

==== Obsessive–compulsive disorder ====
ARFID is known to co-occur with obsessive–compulsive disorder (OCD). Common overlap in symptoms include obsessions related to food and food intake or rituals related to eating.

==== Major depressive disorder ====
People with ARFID are more likely to have major depressive disorder than the general population. However, more clinical research is needed to better understand the relations between ARFID and major depressive disorder, as well as other mood disorders.

== Diagnosis ==
Diagnosis is often based on a diagnostic checklist to test whether an individual is exhibiting certain behaviors and characteristics. Clinicians will look at the variety of foods an individual consumes, as well as the portion size of accepted foods. They will also question how long the avoidance or refusal of particular foods has lasted, and if there are any associated medical concerns, such as malnutrition.

=== Criteria ===
The DSM-5 published in 2013 was the first to include ARFID as a diagnosis.

The criteria were changed in the text revision (DSM-5-TR) published in 2022. The change eliminated an inconsistency in the phrasing of criterion A, clarifying that a failure to meet nutritional requirements is not required to meet the diagnostic criteria for ARFID.

A diagnosis of ARFID can also be given if the full criteria are no longer met for a sustained period of time. In this case, it is specified that the person is in remission.

=== Assessment ===
The Nine Item Avoidant/Restrictive Food Intake Disorder Screen (NIAS) has been developed to assess the presence of ARFID. Across nine items that are scored on a 6-point Likert scale, the NIAS assesses picky eating, appetite, and fear scale.

== Treatment ==
As of June 2024, diagnostic tools and treatment protocols for ARFID are still in the process of development. According to a review from the Journal of Eating Disorders, the limited understanding of avoidant and restrictive eating and its neurobiology poses challenges to effective treatment and management. The authors argue that it is important to avoid segmenting ARFID patients into separate sub-profiles — such as "sensory" patients — and personalize treatment for each individual.

Current treatments commonly involve a multidimensional approach, drawing on these three areas:

Nutritional interventions: Working with clinicians — including a dietitian — to come up with a plan to address immediate needs in regard to weight restoration and nutritional deficits. Individuals with ARFID may be treated with nutritional supplements. In severe cases, patients may require nasogastric or gastrostomy tube feeding.

Pharmacological interventions: The U.S. Food and Drug Administration has not approved any psychotropic medication for treatment of ARFID, and empirical evidence on this front is currently extremely limited. However, small case studies have pointed to a few possible pharmacological interventions: olanzapine, a second-generation atypical antipsychotic; mirtazapine, an antidepressant known for its safety and efficacy in treating depressive and anxious symptoms in adults; and buspirone, typically used to treat generalized anxiety disorder.

Behavioral interventions: Again, solid evidence on effective treatment is limited, but U.S. case studies and non-randomized clinical trials have shown promising results from cognitive behavioral therapy (CBT) adapted for ARFID, as well as family-based therapy (FBT). In Australia, a common treatment is responsive feeding therapy (RFT). Responsive feeding treatment involves a support person establishing mealtime routines with pleasant interactions and modeling to encourage the person struggling with ARFID to respond to hunger cues.

There are support groups for adults with ARFID.

=== Cognitive behavioral therapy ===
A suitable treatment for older children and adults alike is CBT-AR (Cognitive Behavioral Therapy for Avoidant/Restrictive Food Intake Disorder), in which one study found 90% of participants had high levels of satisfaction with the program. While the rate of remission to this type of program is said to be around 40%, it has seen higher efficacy among children and young adults compared to adults, and greater family involvement has also been seen to help. The main goals of treatment for CBT-AR are to achieve or to maintain a healthy weight, treat nutritional deficits, consume items from all five of the basic dietary groups, and to be more comfortable in social settings and circumstances. A CBT-AR workbook can be used as a resource for professionals. This workbook includes psychoeducation about ARFID, self-monitoring records for food logs, and the different stages in treatment.

The treatment is broken up into four stages and aimed to help "reduce nutritional compromise and increase opportunities for exposure to novel foods to reduce negative feelings and predictions about eating". In a simplified format, the stages of this treatment are:

1. Psychoeducation regarding ARFID and CBT-AR, setting up a regular pattern of eating and self-monitoring.
2. Psychoeducation about nutrition deficiencies, selecting new foods to help aid the loss of those deficiencies.
3. Figuring out the root cause(s) of the patient's ARFID, bringing in 5 new foods to examine, describe their features and try tasting them throughout the week, lastly exposure to the foods in the sessions.
4. Evaluating progress and compiling a relapse prevention plan.

This is set to take place over 20–30 sessions ranging from six months to a year.

== Prevention ==
While there is currently no way to predict who will develop ARFID, there may be ways to help reduce the probability of developing a disorder or reducing its severity. A key tool in spotting whether a child's intake is actual cause for concern is a growth chart. A child over age 3 or 4 who falls downward across 2 percentile curves on the weight chart is a cause for concern.

Families can help mitigate future eating problems by establishing appropriate feeding practices at home. This includes avoiding bribing or coercing children into eating different foods, which may cause backlash and heighten anxiety around eating. The parent is responsible for when, where, and what the food is, and the child is responsible for how much they eat.

== Epidemiology ==
Unlike most eating disorders, there may be a higher rate of ARFID in young boys than there is in young girls. Presentations are often heterogenous. Additionally, literature suggests that parental pressure for a child to eat could potentially have a negative impact on the child's food intake. This is associated with picky eating and a decrease in weight during childhood. This can be contributing to the child's hunger cues, as well as the child eating for reasons other than their hunger (e.g., emotions).

In a study conducted between 2008 and 2012, 22.5% of children aged 7–17 in day programs for eating disorder treatment were diagnosed with ARFID. In a 2021 study ARFID also has a high comorbidity with autism spectrum disorder (ASD), with up to 17% of adults with ASD at risk of developing disordered eating, with modest evidence for heritability. Among children, one study revealed a 12.5% prevalence of ASD among those diagnosed with ARFID. Other risk factors include sensory processing sensitivity, gastrointestinal disease, and anxiety associated with eating. Prevalence among children aged 4–7 is estimated to be 1.3%, and 3.7% in females aged 8–18. The female cohort study also had a BMI of 7 points lower than the non-ARFID population.

=== Prevalence of ARFID compared to picky eating ===
Children are often picky eaters, but this does not necessarily mean they meet the criteria for an ARFID diagnosis. ARFID is a rare condition, and though it shares many symptoms with regular picky eating, it is not diagnosed nearly as much. Selective eating, or picky eating, which can exhibit symptoms similar to those of ARFID, can be observed in 13–22% of children from ages 3–11, whereas the prevalence of ARFID has "ranged from 5% to 14% among pediatric inpatient eating disorder (ED) programs and as high as 22.5% in a pediatric ED day treatment program."

== History ==
Prior to the DSM-5, the DSM was not inclusive in recognizing all of the challenges associated with feeding and eating disorders in 3 main domains:

- Eating Disorders Not Otherwise Specified (EDNOS) was an all-inclusive, placeholder group for all individuals that presented challenges with feeding
- The category of Feeding Disorder of Infancy or Early Childhood was noted to be too broad, limiting specification when treating these behaviors
- There are children and youth who present feeding challenges but do not fit within any existing categories to date

The definition introduced in the DSM-5 is broad, which can be both a detriment and an advantage: Stephanie G. Harshman of the neuroendocrine unit at Massachusetts General Hospital has been quoted saying: "The broad definitions used among DSM-5 criteria for [ARFID] provide substantial flexibility in a clinical setting". It can be detrimental, as a broad scope can lead to false positive diagnoses of ARFID, though as an advantage it is better than the DSM-IV description which landed people with ARFID in the "EDNOS" (eating disorder not otherwise specified) category and made it more difficult for people with the condition to reach potential treatment.
