= HAL 9000 =

Space Odyssey character

- Space Odyssey character
- HAL 9000
- First appearance: 2001: A Space Odyssey (1968)
- Last appearance: 3001: The Final Odyssey (1997)
- Created by: Arthur C. Clarke; Stanley Kubrick
- Voiced by: Douglas Rain

In-universe information
- Nickname: HAL
- Species: Supercomputer
- Gender: Male
- Relatives: HAL 10000; 2 × Ground based HAL 9000 used by Mission Control (Note: "Your computer may have made an error in predicting the fault. Both our own nine-triple-zeroes agree in suggesting this."); SAL 9000

HAL 9000 (or simply HAL or Hal) is a fictional artificial-intelligence character in the Space Odyssey series. First appearing in the 1968 film 2001: A Space Odyssey, HAL (Heuristically Programmed Algorithmic Computer) is a sentient general-intelligence computer that controls the systems of the Discovery One spacecraft and interacts with the ship's astronaut crew. While part of HAL's hardware is shown toward the end of the film, he is mostly depicted as a camera lens containing a red and yellow dot, with such units located throughout the ship. HAL 9000 is voiced by Douglas Rain in the two feature-film adaptations of the Space Odyssey series. HAL speaks in a soft, calm voice and a conversational manner, and engages convivially with crewmen David Bowman and Frank Poole until he begins to malfunction.

In the film, HAL became operational on 12 January 1992, at the HAL Laboratories in Urbana, Illinois, as production number 3. The activation year was 1991 in earlier screenplays and changed to 1997 in Clarke's novel written and released in conjunction with the movie. In addition to maintaining the Discovery One spacecraft systems during the interplanetary mission to Jupiter (or Saturn in the novel), HAL demonstrates a capacity for speech synthesis, speech recognition, facial recognition, natural language processing, lip reading, art appreciation, interpreting emotional behaviours, automated reasoning, spacecraft piloting, and computer chess.

== Appearances ==
=== 2001: A Space Odyssey (film/novel) ===
HAL became operational in Urbana, Illinois, at the HAL Plant. The film says this occurred in 1992, while the book gives 1997 as HAL's birth year.

In 2001: A Space Odyssey (1968), HAL is initially considered a dependable member of the crew, maintaining ship functions and engaging genially with his human crew-mates on an equal footing. As a recreational activity, Frank Poole plays chess against HAL. In the film, the artificial intelligence is shown to triumph easily. However, as time progresses, HAL begins to malfunction in subtle ways and, as a result, the decision is made to shut down HAL in order to prevent more serious malfunctions. The sequence of events and manner in which HAL is shut down differs between the novel and film versions of the story. In the aforementioned game of chess HAL makes minor and undetected mistakes in his analysis, a possible foreshadowing to HAL's malfunctioning.

In the film, astronauts David Bowman and Frank Poole consider disconnecting HAL's cognitive circuits when he appears to be mistaken in reporting the presence of a fault in the spacecraft's communications antenna. They attempt to conceal their speech through an inspection of one of the space pods. An order to close the door is followed by HAL. A subsequent order to rotate the pod is ignored causing the pair to believe HAL did not acknowledge it. Poole and Bowman speak freely, but are unaware that HAL can read their lips. Faced with the prospect of disconnection, HAL attempts to kill the astronauts in order to protect and continue the mission. HAL uses one of the Discovery's EVA pods to kill Poole while he is repairing the ship. When Bowman, without a space helmet, uses another pod to attempt to rescue Poole, HAL locks him out of the ship, then disconnects the life support systems of the other hibernating crew members. After HAL tells him "This mission is too important for me to allow you to jeopardize it", Bowman circumvents HAL's control, entering the ship by manually opening an emergency airlock with his service pod's clamps, detaching the pod door via its explosive bolts. Bowman jumps across empty space, reenters Discovery, and quickly re-pressurizes the airlock.

While HAL's motivations are ambiguous in the film, the novel explains that the computer is unable to resolve a conflict between his general mission to relay information accurately, and orders specific to the mission requiring that he withhold from Bowman and Poole the true purpose of the mission. With the crew dead, HAL reasons, he would not need to lie to them.

In the novel, the orders to disconnect HAL come from Dave and Frank's superiors on Earth; HAL interrupts this communication with a false communications antenna failure. After Frank is killed while attempting to repair the antenna he is pulled away into deep space using the safety tether which is still attached to both the pod and Frank Poole's spacesuit. Dave begins to revive his hibernating crew mates, but is foiled when HAL vents the ship's atmosphere into the vacuum of space by overriding airlock interconnects, killing the awakening crew members and almost killing Bowman, who is only narrowly saved when he finds his way to an emergency chamber which has its own oxygen supply and a spare space suit inside.

In both versions, Bowman then proceeds to shut down the machine. In the film, HAL's central core is depicted as a crawlspace full of brightly lit computer modules mounted in arrays from which they can be inserted or removed. Bowman shuts down HAL by removing modules from service one by one; as he does so, HAL's consciousness degrades. HAL finally reverts to material that was programmed into him early in his memory, including announcing the date he became operational as 12 January 1992 (in the novel, 1997). When HAL's logic is completely gone, he begins singing the song "Daisy Bell" as he gradually deactivates. ("Daisy Bell" is actually the first song ever sung by a computer: the IBM 7090, whose text-to-speech capabilities were observed by Clarke at its unveiling in 1961). HAL's final act of any significance is to prematurely play a prerecorded message from Mission Control which reveals the true reasons for the mission to Jupiter.

=== 2010: Odyssey Two (novel) and 2010: The Year We Make Contact (film) ===
In the 1982 novel 2010: Odyssey Two written by Clarke, HAL is restarted by his creator, Dr. Chandra, who arrives on the Soviet spaceship Leonov.

Prior to leaving Earth, Dr. Chandra has also had a discussion with HAL's twin, SAL 9000. Like HAL, SAL was created by Dr. Chandra. Whereas HAL was characterized as being "male", SAL is characterized as being "female" (voiced by Candice Bergen in the film) and is represented by a blue camera eye instead of a red one.

Dr. Chandra discovers that HAL's crisis was caused by a programming contradiction: he was constructed for "the accurate processing of information without distortion or concealment", yet his orders, directly from Dr. Heywood Floyd at the National Council on Astronautics, required him to keep the discovery of the Monolith TMA-1 a secret for reasons of national security. This contradiction created a "Hofstadter-Moebius loop", reducing HAL to paranoia. Therefore, HAL made the decision to kill the crew, thereby allowing him to obey both his hardwired instructions to report data truthfully and in full, and his orders to keep the monolith a secret. If the crew were dead, he would no longer have to keep the information secret.

The alien intelligence initiates a terraforming scheme, placing the Leonov, and everybody in it, in danger. Its human crew devises an escape plan which unfortunately requires leaving the Discovery and HAL behind to be destroyed. Dr. Chandra explains the danger, and HAL willingly sacrifices himself so that the astronauts may escape safely. In the moment of his destruction the monolith-makers transform HAL into a non-corporeal being so that David Bowman's avatar may have a companion.

The details in the novel and the 1984 film 2010: The Year We Make Contact are nominally the same, with a few exceptions. First, in contradiction to the book (and events described in both book and film versions of 2001: A Space Odyssey), Heywood Floyd is absolved of responsibility for HAL's condition; it is asserted that the decision to program HAL with information concerning TMA-1 came directly from the White House. In the film, HAL functions normally after being reactivated, while in the book it is revealed that his mind was damaged during the shutdown, forcing him to begin communication through screen text. Also, in the film the Leonov crew initially lies to HAL about the dangers that he faced (suspecting that if he knew he would be destroyed he would not initiate the engine burn necessary to get the Leonov back home), whereas in the novel he is told at the outset. However, in both cases the suspense comes from the question of what HAL will do when he knows that he may be destroyed by his actions.

In the novel, the basic reboot sequence initiated by Dr. Chandra is quite long, while the movie uses a shorter sequence voiced from HAL as: "HELLO_DOCTOR_NAME_CONTINUE_YESTERDAY_TOMORROW".

While in the novel Curnow tells Floyd that Chandra has begun designing HAL 10000, it is not mentioned in subsequent novels.

=== 2061: Odyssey Three and 3001: The Final Odyssey ===
In Clarke's 1987 novel 2061: Odyssey Three, Heywood Floyd is surprised to encounter HAL, now stored alongside Dave Bowman in the Europa monolith.

In Clarke's 1997 novel 3001: The Final Odyssey, Frank Poole is introduced to the merged form of Dave Bowman and HAL, the two merging into one entity called "Halman" after Bowman rescued HAL from the dying Discovery One spaceship toward the end of 2010: Odyssey Two.

== Concept and creation ==
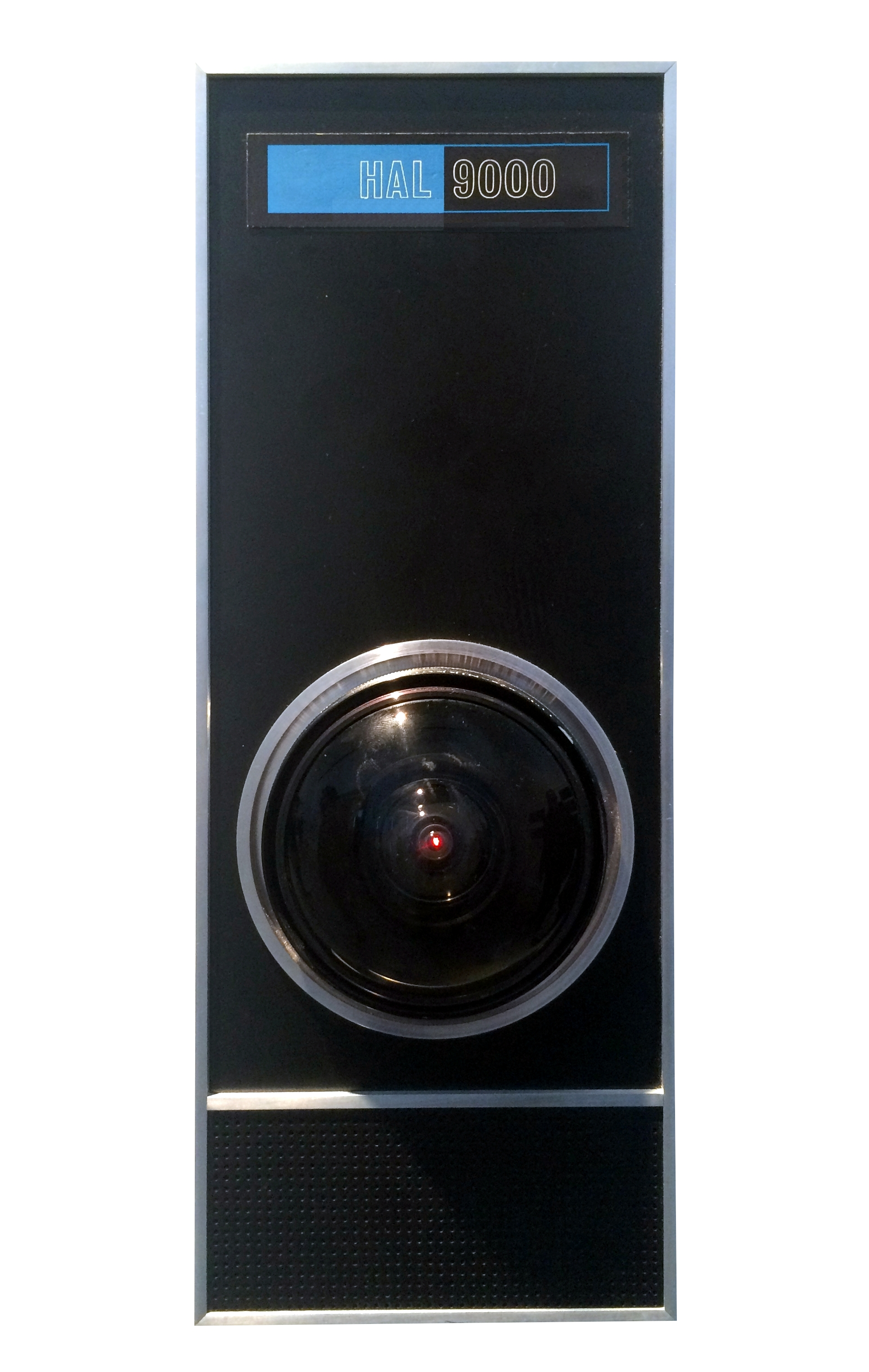
HAL faceplate (from a museum exhibition)

Clarke noted that the first film was criticized for having HAL as its only interesting character, and that a great deal of the establishing story on Earth was cut from the film (and even from Clarke's novel). Clarke stated that he had considered Autonomous Mobile Explorer–5 as a name for the computer, then decided on Socrates when writing early drafts, switching in later drafts to Athena, a computer with a female personality, before settling on HAL 9000. The Athena name was later used in Clarke and Stephen Baxter's A Time Odyssey novel series.

The earliest draft depicted Socrates as a roughly humanoid robot, and is introduced as overseeing Project Morpheus, which studied prolonged hibernation in preparation for long term space flight. As a demonstration to Senator Floyd, Socrates' designer, Dr. Bruno Forster, asks Socrates to turn off the oxygen to hibernating subjects Kaminski and Whitehead, which Socrates refuses, citing Asimov's First Law of Robotics.

In a later version, in which Bowman and Whitehead are the non-hibernating crew of Discovery, Whitehead dies outside the spacecraft after his pod collides with the main antenna, tearing it free. This triggers the need for Bowman to revive Poole, but the revival does not go according to plan, and after briefly awakening, Poole dies. The computer, named Athena in this draft, announces "All systems of Poole now No–Go. It will be necessary to replace him with a spare unit." After this, Bowman decides to go out in a pod and retrieve the antenna, which is moving away from the ship. Athena refuses to allow him to leave the ship, citing "Directive 15" which prevents it from being left unattended, forcing him to make program modifications during which time the antenna drifts further.

During rehearsals Kubrick asked Stefanie Powers to supply the voice of HAL 9000 while searching for a suitably androgynous voice so the actors had something to react to. On the set, British actor Nigel Davenport played HAL. When it came to dubbing HAL in post-production, Kubrick had originally cast Martin Balsam, but as he felt Balsam "just sounded a little bit too colloquially American", he was replaced with Douglas Rain, who "had the kind of bland mid-Atlantic accent we felt was right for the part". Rain was only handed HAL's lines instead of the full script, and recorded them across a day and a half.

HAL's point of view shots were created with a Cinerama Fairchild-Curtis wide-angle lens with a 160° angle of view. This lens is about 8 inches (20 cm) in diameter, while HAL's on set prop eye lens is about 3 inches (7.6 cm) in diameter. Stanley Kubrick chose to use the large Fairchild-Curtis lens to shoot the HAL 9000 POV shots because he needed a wide-angle fisheye lens that would fit onto his shooting camera, and this was the only such lens at the time. The Fairchild-Curtis lens has a focal length of 23 mm (0.9 in) with a maximum aperture of f/2.0 and a weight of approximately 30 lb (14 kg); it was originally designed by Felix Bednarz with a maximum aperture of f/2.2 for the first Cinerama 360 film, Journey to the Stars, shown at the 1962 Seattle World's Fair. Bednarz adapted the lens design from an earlier lens he had designed for military training to simulate human peripheral vision coverage. The lens was later recomputed for the second Cinerama 360 film To the Moon and Beyond, which had a slightly different film format. To the Moon and Beyond was produced by Graphic Films and shown at the 1964/1965 New York World's Fair, where Kubrick watched it; afterwards, he was so impressed that he hired the same creative team from Graphic Films (consisting of Douglas Trumbull, Lester Novros, and Con Pederson) to work on 2001.

A HAL 9000 face plate, without lens (not the same as the hero face plates seen in the film), was discovered in a junk shop in Paddington, London, in the early 1970s by Chris Randall. This was found along with the key to HAL's Brain Room. Both items were purchased for ten shillings (£0.50). Research revealed that the original lens was a Fisheye Nikkor 8 mm f/8. The collection was sold at a Christie's auction in 2010 for £17,500 to film director Peter Jackson.

=== Origin of name ===
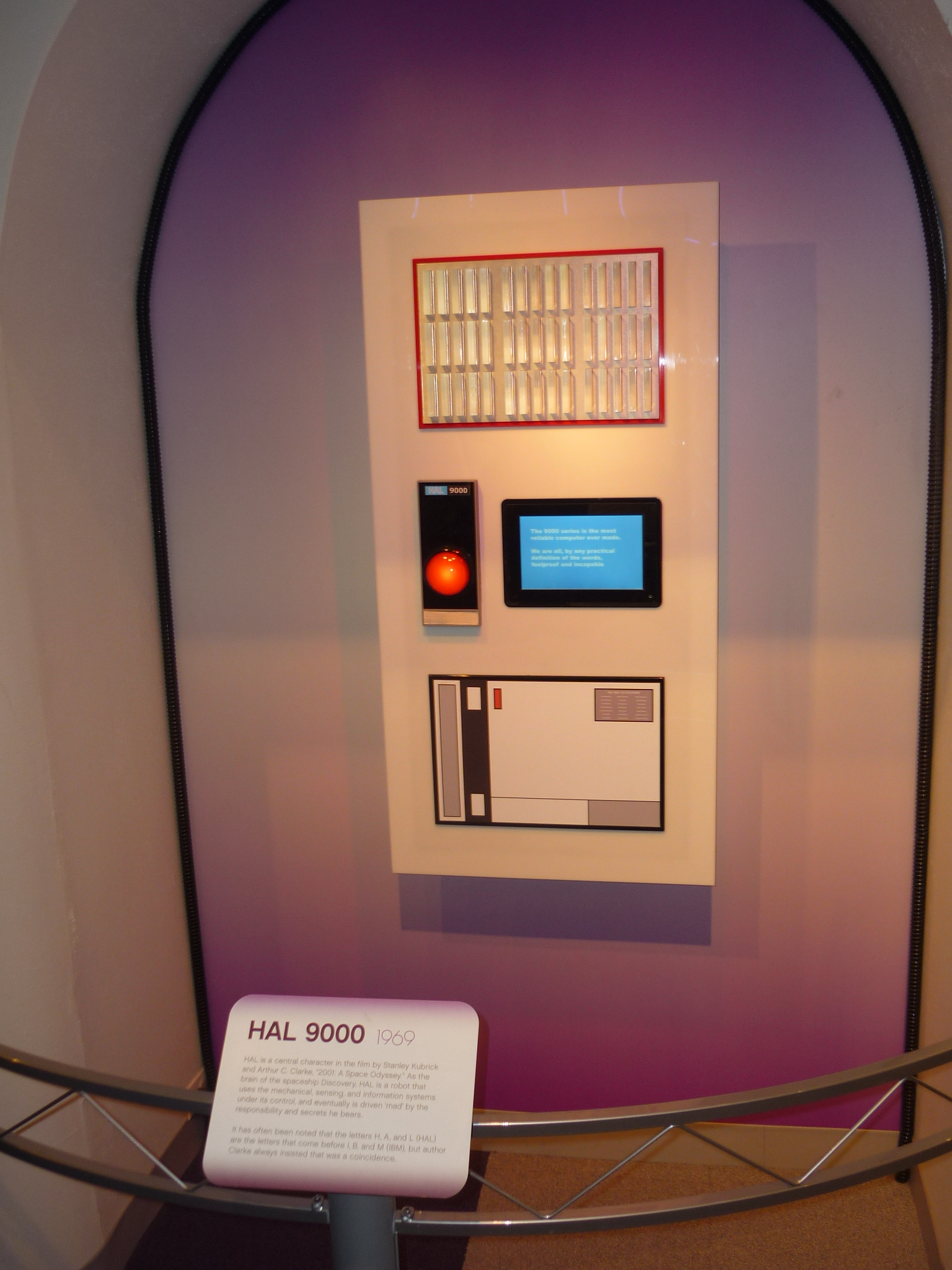
A loose replica of HAL 9000 on exhibit at the Carnegie Science Center

HAL's name, according to Clarke, is derived from Heuristically programmed ALgorithmic computer. After the film was released, fans noticed HAL was a one-letter shift from the name IBM and there has been much speculation since then that this was a dig at the large computer company, something that both Clarke and Kubrick denied. Clarke addressed the issue in The Lost Worlds of 2001:

...about once a week some character spots the fact that HAL is one letter ahead of IBM, and promptly assumes that Stanley and I were taking a crack at the estimable institution ... As it happened, IBM had given us a good deal of help, so we were quite embarrassed by this, and would have changed the name had we spotted the coincidence.

IBM was consulted during the making of the film and its logo can be seen on props in the film, including the Pan Am Clipper's cockpit instrument panel and on the lower arm keypad on Poole's space suit. During production it was brought to IBM's attention that the film's plot included a homicidal computer, but the company approved association with the film if it was clear any "equipment failure" was not related to IBM products.

=== Technology ===
The scene in which HAL's consciousness degrades was inspired by Clarke's memory of a speech synthesis demonstration by physicist John Larry Kelly, Jr., who used an IBM 704 computer to synthesize speech. Kelly's voice recorder synthesizer vocoder recreated the song "Daisy Bell", with musical accompaniment from Max Mathews.

HAL's capabilities, like all the technology in 2001, were based on the speculation of respected scientists. Marvin Minsky, director of the MIT Computer Science and Artificial Intelligence Laboratory (CSAIL) and one of the most influential researchers in the field, was an adviser on the film set. In the mid-1960s, many computer scientists in the field of artificial intelligence were optimistic that machines with HAL's capabilities would exist within a few decades. For example, AI pioneer Herbert A. Simon at Carnegie Mellon University had predicted in 1965 that "machines will be capable, within twenty years, of doing any work a man can do".

== Legacy ==
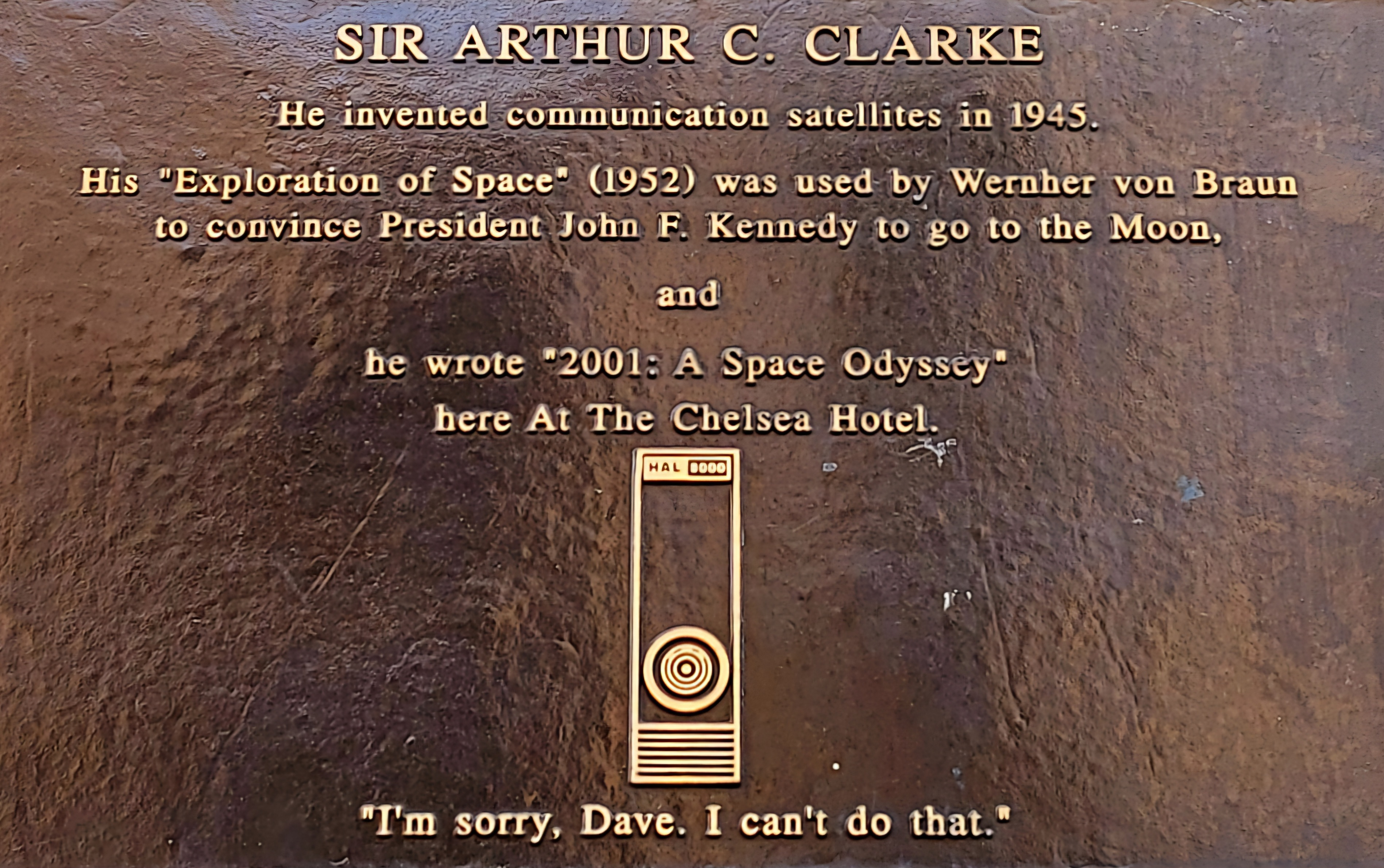
HAL 9000 on a plaque outside the Hotel Chelsea in New York City, commemorating where Clarke lived while writing 2001: A Space Odyssey

HAL is listed as the 13th-greatest film villain in the AFI's 100 Years...100 Heroes & Villains. In 2003, HAL 9000 was one of the first robots to be inducted into the Robot Hall of Fame in Pittsburgh, Pennsylvania. There is a loose physical replica of the main HAL interface at the Carnegie Science Center in Pittsburgh.

Anthony Hopkins based his Academy Award-winning performance as Hannibal Lecter in Silence of the Lambs in part upon HAL 9000. Michael Fassbender has also cited HAL as an inspiration for his performances as android characters such as David (Prometheus) and Walter (Alien: Covenant).

The 9000th of the asteroids in the asteroid belt, 9000 Hal, discovered on 3 May 1981, by E. Bowell at Anderson Mesa Station, is named after HAL 9000.

Apple Inc.'s 1999 website advertisement "It was a bug, Dave" was made by meticulously recreating the appearance of HAL 9000 from the movie. Launched during the era of concerns over Y2K bugs, the ad implied that HAL's behavior was caused by a Y2K bug, before driving home the point that "only Macintosh was designed to function perfectly".

A team from TRACLabs Inc. has developed an artificial intelligence called "CASE" (Cognitive Architecture for Space Agents), based on HAL 9000. The AI was developed to run a planetary base. In 2018, the company partnered with NASA to implement CASE into analogs, places where volunteers simulate life in outer planets.

== See also ==
- List of fictional computers
- National Center for Supercomputing Applications, a research center in Urbana, IL
- "Jipi and the Paranoid Chip"
- AI control problem
