= 9000 Hal =

Main-belt asteroid

Discovery
- Discovered by: E. Bowell
- Discovery site: Anderson Mesa Stn.
- Discovery date: 3 May 1981

Designations
- Pronunciation: /ˈhæl/
- Named after: HAL 9000 (Fictional supercomputer)
- Alternative designations: 1981 JO · 1975 VH_{3} 1981 JJ_{3} · 1995 US_{3}
- Minor planet category: main-belt · (inner) background · Flora

Orbital characteristics
- Epoch 23 March 2018 (JD 2458200.5)
- Uncertainty parameter 0
- Observation arc: 41.49 yr (15,156 d)
- Aphelion: 2.6955 AU
- Perihelion: 1.7648 AU
- Semi-major axis: 2.2301 AU
- Eccentricity: 0.2087
- Orbital period (sidereal): 3.33 yr (1,216 d)
- Mean anomaly: 328.38°
- Mean motion: 0° 17^{m} 45.24^{s} / day
- Inclination: 6.2618°
- Longitude of ascending node: 226.61°
- Argument of perihelion: 79.871°

Physical characteristics
- Mean diameter: 3.61±0.78 km 4.11 km (calculated); 4.134±0.935 km
- Synodic rotation period: 22.68±0.02 h (poor); 908 h
- Geometric albedo: 0.24 (assumed); 0.26±0.13; 0.375±0.184
- Spectral type: S (assumed)
- Absolute magnitude (H): 13.6; 14.0; 14.1; 14.35±0.66; 14.42

9000 Hal, provisional designation 1981 JO, is a stony background asteroid and slow rotator from the inner regions of the asteroid belt, approximately 4 kilometers (2.5 miles) in diameter. It was discovered on 3 May 1981, by American astronomer Edward Bowell at Lowell's Anderson Mesa Station near Flagstaff, Arizona, in the United States. The likely elongated S-type asteroid has an exceptionally long rotation period of 908 hours. It was named after the fictional supercomputer HAL 9000, featured in the 1968 film 2001: A Space Odyssey.

== Orbit and classification ==
Hal is a non-family asteroid of the main belt's background population when applying the hierarchical clustering method to its proper orbital elements. Based on osculating Keplerian orbital elements, the asteroid has also been classified as a member of the Flora family (402), a giant asteroid family and the largest family of stony asteroids in the main-belt.

Hal orbits the Sun in the inner asteroid belt at a distance of 1.8–2.7 AU once every 3 years and 4 months (1,216 days; semi-major axis of 2.23 AU). Its orbit has an eccentricity of 0.21 and an inclination of 6° with respect to the ecliptic. The asteroid was first observed as 1975 VH_{3} at Crimea–Nauchnij in November 1975. The body's observation arc begins with its official discovery observation at Anderson Mesa in May 1981.

== Physical characteristics ==
Hal is an assumed stony S-type asteroid, based on the Collaborative Asteroid Lightcurve Link's (CALL) classification into the Flora family.

=== Rotation period ===
In August 2008, a rotational lightcurve of Hal was obtained from photometric observations by Slovak astronomers Adrián Galád, Jozef Világi, Leonard Kornoš and Štefan Gajdoš at Modra Observatory. Lightcurve analysis gave an exceptionally long rotation period of 908 hours with a high brightness variation of 0.9 magnitude (U=2+). This makes Hal one of the slowest rotators known to exist. In addition, the body's high brightness amplitude is indicative of a non-spherical shape.

An alternative measurement by French amateur astronomers Pierre Antonini and René Roy gave a much shorter period of 22.68 hours. The result, however, is considered of poor quality by CALL (U=1).

=== Diameter and albedo ===
According to the survey carried out by the NEOWISE mission of NASA's Wide-field Infrared Survey Explorer, Hal measures between 3.61 and 4.134 kilometers in diameter and its surface has an albedo between 0.26 and 0.375. CALL assumes an albedo of 0.24 – derived from 8 Flora, the Flora family's parent body – and calculates a diameter of 4.11 kilometers based on an absolute magnitude of 14.1.

== Naming ==
This minor planet was named after the fictional and homicidal supercomputer HAL 9000, featured in both Arthur C. Clarke's novel and Stanley Kubrick's film 2001: A Space Odyssey (1968). HAL stands for Heuristically programmed Algorithmic computer. It is one of the best-known artificial intelligence characters in modern movies. The official naming citation was published by the Minor Planet Center on 4 May 1999 (M.P.C. 34628). The asteroids 4923 Clarke and 10221 Kubrick were named after the writer and film director, respectively.
