= Giuseppe Piazzi =

Italian Catholic priest, mathematician and astronomer (1746–1826)

The Reverend Giuseppe Piazzi CR
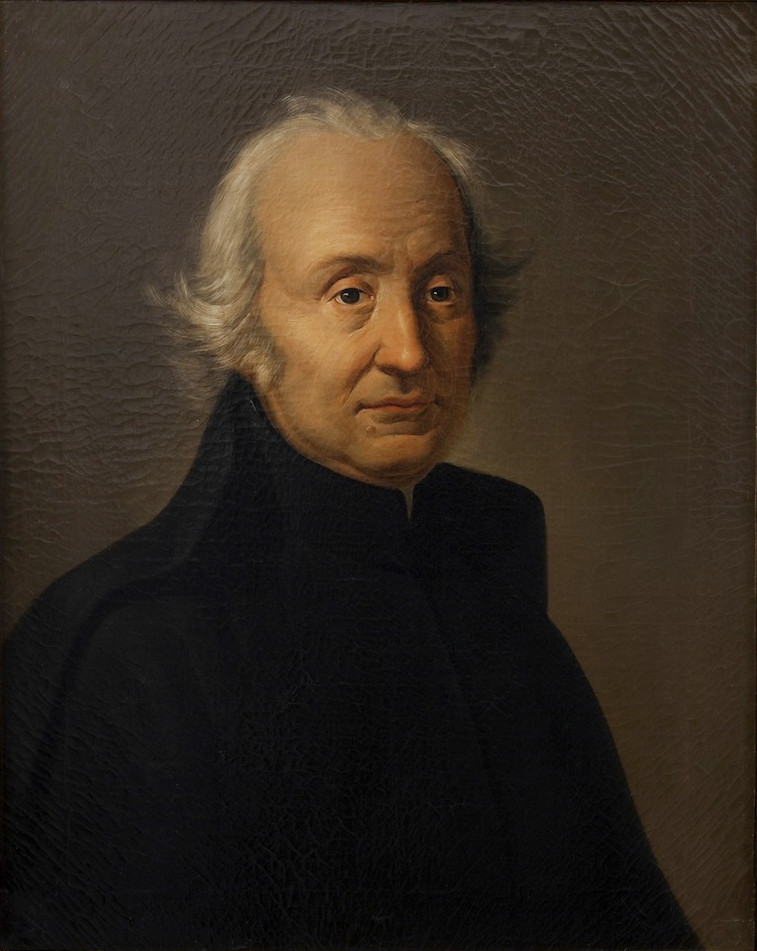
- Portrait by Costanzo Angelini, c. 1825
- Born: Gioacchino Giuseppe Maria Ubaldo Nicolò Piazzi; 16 July 1746; Ponte in Valtellina, Duchy of Milan
- Died: 22 July 1826 (aged 80); Naples, Kingdom of Naples
- Known for: Discovery of the first asteroid, Ceres
- Awards: Lalande Prize (1803)
- Scientific career
- Fields: Astronomy
- Workplaces: University of Malta; University of Palermo; Palermo Astronomical Observatory

Signature
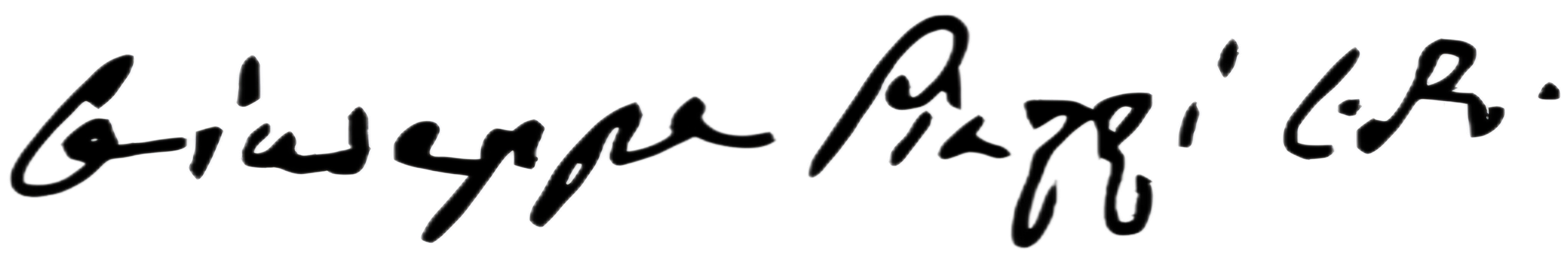

Giuseppe Piazzi (Note: US: /ˈpjɑːtsi/ PYAHT-see; Italian: [dʒuˈzɛppe ˈpjattsi]) (16 July 1746 – 22 July 1826) was an Italian Catholic priest of the Theatine order, mathematician, and astronomer. He established an observatory at Palermo, now the Osservatorio Astronomico di Palermo – Giuseppe S. Vaiana. He is perhaps most famous for his discovery of the first asteroid, (1) Ceres.

== Early life ==
Giuseppe Piazzi was born in Ponte in Valtellina, around 100 km north east of Milan, to a well-to-do family. No documented account of his scientific education exists in any of the astronomer's biographies, even the earliest ones. However, it is certain that Piazzi pursued studies in Turin, likely attending lessons by Giovanni Battista Beccaria. Between 1768 and 1770, he resided at the Theatines' Home in Sant'Andrea della Valle, Rome, where he studied mathematics under François Jacquier.

In July 1770, Piazzi was appointed to the chair of Mathematics at the University of Malta. In December 1773, he moved to Ravenna, where he served as "prefetto degli studenti" and as a lecturer in Philosophy and Mathematics at the Collegio dei Nobili, a position he held until early 1779. After brief periods in Cremona and Rome, Piazzi relocated to Palermo in March 1781, taking up a role as lecturer in mathematics at the University of Palermo (then known as the "Accademia de' Regj Studi")

He kept this position until 19 January 1787, when he became Professor of Astronomy. Almost at the same time, he was granted permission to spend two years in Paris and London, to undergo some practical training in astronomy and also to get some instruments to be specially built for the Palermo Observatory, whose foundation he was in charge of.

In the period spent abroad, from 13 March 1787 until the end of 1789, Piazzi became acquainted with the major French and English astronomers of his time and was able to have the famous altazimuthal circle made by Jesse Ramsden, one of the most skilled instrument-makers of the 18th century. The circle was the most important instrument of the Palermo Observatory, whose official foundation took place on 1 July 1790.

In 1817, King Ferdinand put Piazzi in charge of the completion of the Capodimonte (Naples) Observatory, naming him General Director of the Naples and Sicily Observatories.

== Astronomy career ==
=== Star cataloguing ===
Piazzi supervised the compilation of the Palermo Catalogue of stars, containing 7,646 star entries with unprecedented precision, including the star named "Garnet Star" by Herschel, and the original Rotanev and Sualocin. The catalogue wasn't finished for first edition publication until 1803, with a second edition in 1814. Piazzi's catalogue was more accurate than any of its predecessors; Franz Xaver von Zach pronounced it epochal, and the Institut de France awarded it the Lalande Prize for the best astronomical work published in 1803.

Spurred by the success discovering Ceres (see below), and in the line of his catalogue program, Piazzi studied the proper motions of stars to find parallax measurement candidates. One of them, 61 Cygni, was specially appointed as a good candidate for measuring a parallax, which was later performed by Friedrich Wilhelm Bessel. The star system 61 Cygni is sometimes still called variously Piazzi's Flying Star and Bessel's Star.

=== Discovery of Ceres ===
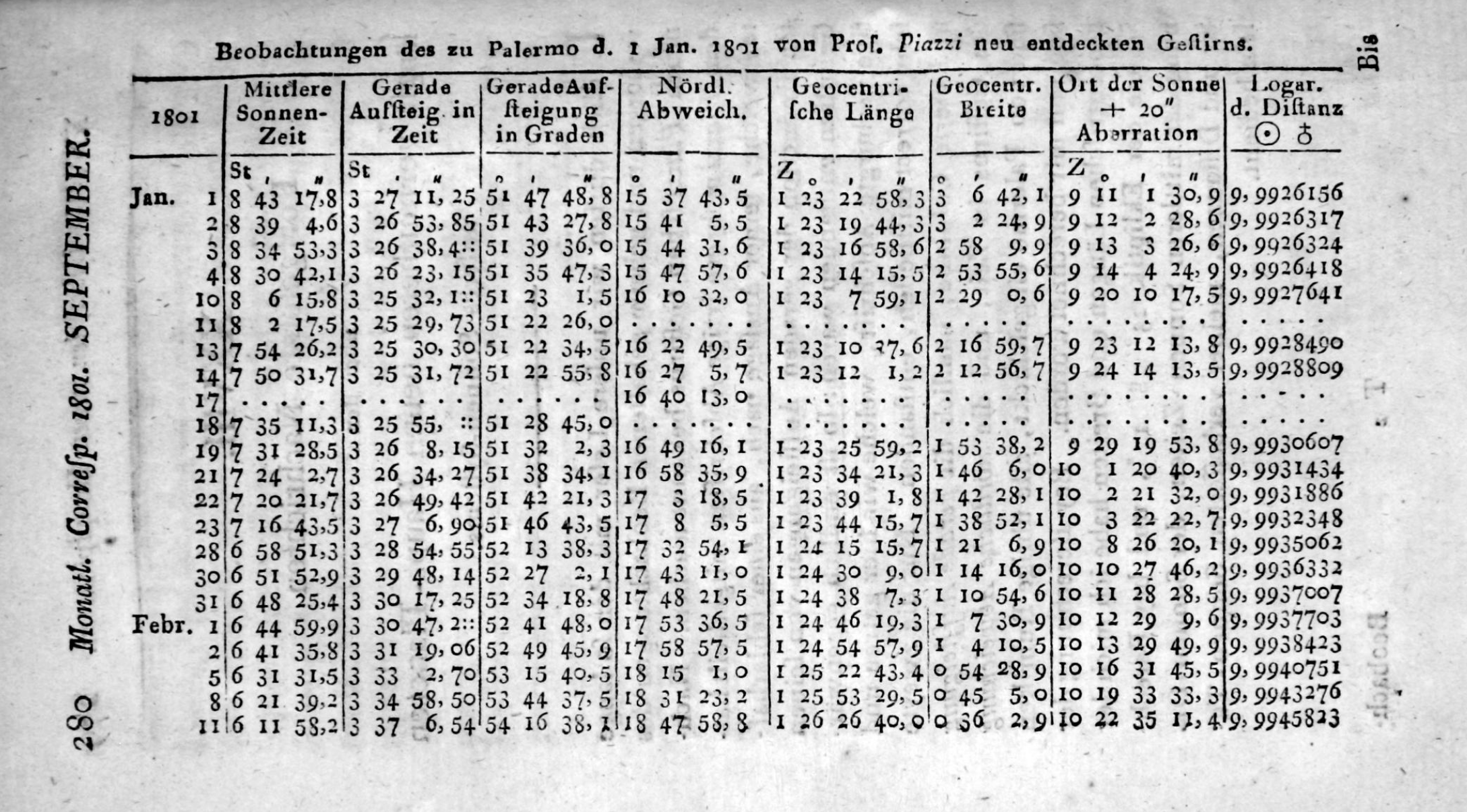
Piazzi's observations published in the Monatliche Correspondenz, September 1801

Twenty years prior to Piazzi's discovery of Ceres, William Herschel had discovered Uranus, the first planet discovered by telescope. Thus the possibility of new planets was in the air. Astronomers had even predicted additional planets based on geometric patterns among the known ones, and an invitation to join the search was in the mail when Piazzi independently discovered Ceres.

On 1 January 1801 Piazzi noticed that a "stellar object" moved against the background of fixed stars. At first he thought it was a fixed star, but after several days' observation he became convinced it was a new planet, or as he called it, a new "star" (the word "star" being used for both planets and fixed stars).

In his journal he wrote:

The light was a little faint, and of the colour of Jupiter, but similar to many others which generally are reckoned of the eighth magnitude. Therefore I had no doubt of its being any other than a fixed star. In the evening of the second I repeated my observations, and having found that it did not correspond either in time or in distance from the zenith with the former observation, I began to entertain some doubts of its accuracy. I conceived afterwards a great suspicion that it might be a new star. The evening of the third, my suspicion was converted into certainty, being assured it was not a fixed star. Nevertheless before I made it known, I waited till the evening of the fourth, when I had the satisfaction to see it had moved at the same rate as on the preceding days.

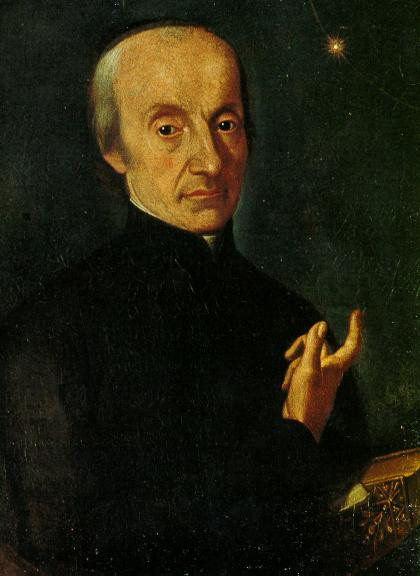
Giuseppe Velasquez, Giuseppe Piazzi and Ceres, oil on canvas, c. 1803

In spite of his assumption that it was a planet, he took the conservative route and announced it as a comet. In a letter to astronomer Barnaba Oriani of Milan he made his suspicions known in writing:

I have announced this star as a comet, but since it is not accompanied by any nebulosity and, further, since its movement is so slow and rather uniform, it has occurred to me several times that it might be something better than a comet. But I have been careful not to advance this supposition to the public.

He was not able to observe it long enough to determine its orbit, as it was soon lost in the glare of the Sun. Unable to compute its orbit from such a short observation with existing methods, the mathematician Carl Friedrich Gauss developed a new method of orbit calculation that enabled astronomers to locate it again. After its orbit was established, it was clear that Piazzi's conclusion was correct and his object was indeed a small planet. Coincidentally, it orbited almost exactly where the Titius–Bode law predicted an additional planet should be.

Piazzi named his discovery "Ceres Ferdinandea," after the Roman and Sicilian goddess of grain and King Ferdinand IV of Naples and Sicily. The Ferdinandea part was later dropped for political reasons. Ceres turned out to be the first discovered, and the largest, of a new class of thousands of minor planets orbiting within the asteroid belt.

== Posthumous honours ==
Born in Italy and named in his honour was the astronomer Charles Piazzi Smyth, son of the astronomer William Henry Smyth. In 1871, a memorial statue of Piazzi sculpted by Costantino Corti was dedicated in the main plaza of his birthplace, Ponte. In 1923, the 1000th asteroid to be numbered was named 1000 Piazzia in his honour. The lunar crater Piazzi was named after him in 1935. More recently, a large albedo feature, probably a crater, imaged by the Hubble Space Telescope on Ceres, has been informally named Piazzi.

== Works ==
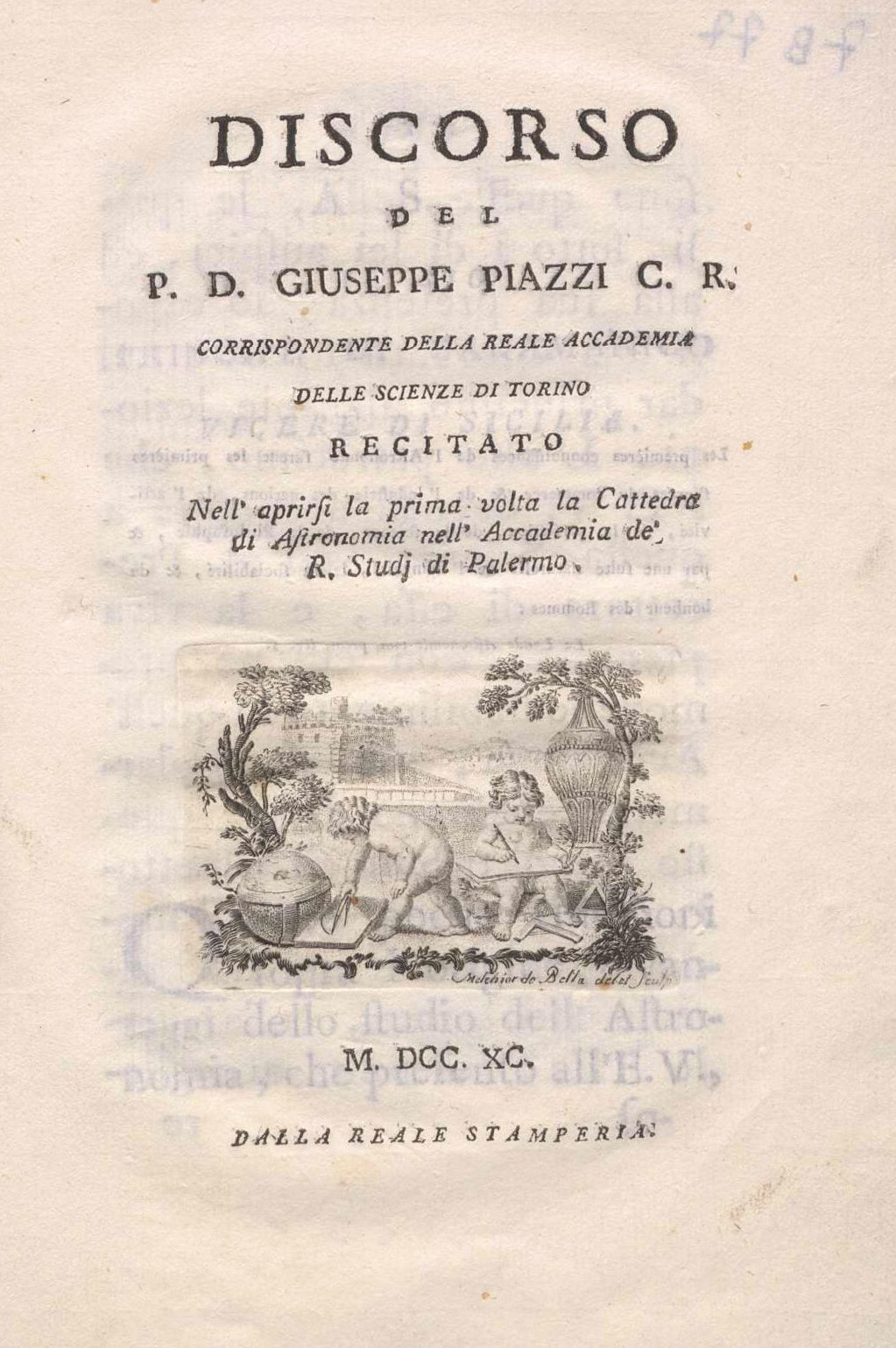
Discorso recitato nell'aprirsi la prima volta la Cattedra di astronomia nell'Accademia de' r. Studj di Palermo, 1790

- Discorso recitato nell'aprirsi la prima volta la Cattedra di astronomia nell'Accademia de' r. Studj di Palermo (in Italian). Palermo: Stamperia reale. 1790.
- Della specola astronomica de' regj studj di Palermo libri quattro (in Italian). Palermo: Stamperia reale. 1792.
- Sull'orologio Italiano e l'Europeo (in Italian). Palermo: Stamperia reale. 1798.
- Risultati delle osservazioni della nuova stella, scoperta il dì 1. Gennaio all'Osservatorio Reale di Palermo, Palermo: nella Reale Stamperia, 1801
- Della scoperta del nuovo pianeta Cerere Ferdinandea (Palermo, 1802)
- Praecipuarum stellarum inerrantium positiones mediae ineunte seculo 19. ex observationibus habitis in specula Panormitana ab anno 1792 ad annum 1802 (in Latin). Panormi: ex Regia Typographia Militari. 1803.
- Præcipuarum stellarum inerrantium positiones mediæ ineunte seculo XIX ex obsrvationibus habitis in specula Panormitana ab anno 1792 ad annum 1813 (in Latin). Panormi: ex Regia Typographia Militari. 1814.
- Codice metrico siculo (in Italian). 2 vols. Catania: Stamperia Dell'Università Degli Studi. 1812.
- Lezioni di astronomia (in Italian). 2 vols. Palermo: Stamperia reale. 1817.
- Ragguaglio del Reale Osservatorio di Napoli eretto sulla collina di Capodimonte (in Italian). Naples: Dalla Tipografia Francese. 1821.

== See also ==
- Niccolò Cacciatore, his assistant and successor in the post as director
- List of Roman Catholic scientist-clerics
