= List of Hungarian writers =

Below is an alphabetical list of notable Hungarian writers. Abbreviations: children's (ch), comedy (co), drama (d), fiction (f), non-fiction (nf), poetry (p)

== A–B ==
- Emil Ábrányi (1850–1920, nf)
- Endre Ady (1877–1919, p, nf)
- Mariska Ady (1888–1977, f/p)
- Zoltán Ambrus (1861–1932, nf)
- Péter Apor (1676–1752, nf)
- Lajos Áprily (1887–1965, p)
- János Arany (1817–1882, p)
- Mihály Babits (1883–1941, p/f/nf)
- József Bajza (1804–1858, nf/p)
- Stefano Bakonyi (1892–1969, nf)
- Bálint Balassi (1554–1594, p)
- Béla Balázs (1884–1949, nf/p)
- Zsófia Balla (born 1949, p/nf)
- Linda Vero Ban (born 1976, nf)
- Zsófia Bán (born 1957, f/nf)
- Miklós Bánffy (1873–1950, nf/p)
- Janos Bardi (1923–1990, nf/f/d)
- János Batsányi (1763–1845, p)
- Elek Benedek (1859–1929, nf/ch)
- Dániel Berzsenyi (1776–1836, p/nf)
- György Bessenyei (1747–1811, d/p)
- Kata Bethlen (1700–1759, nf)
- Amália Bezerédj (1804–1837, f)
- László Z. Bitó (1934–2021, f/nf)
- Ádám Bodor (born 1936, nf)
- Janka Boga (1886–1963, d/nf)
- Katalin Bogyay (born 1956, nf)
- Edith Bone (1889–1975, nf)
- Péter Bornemisza (1535–1584, nf/d)
- Ágota Bozai (born 1965, f/nf)
- Sándor Bródy (1863–1924, nf/f)
- Edith Bruck (born 1932, f/d)
- Zsuzsanna Budapest (born 1940, nf/d)

== C–F ==
- Géza Csáth (1887–1919, f/d/nf)
- Gergely Csiky (1842–1891, d/f/nf)
- Mihály Csokonai Vitéz (1773–1805, p/d)
- Sándor Csoóri (1930–2016, nf/p)
- György Dalos (born 1943, f/nf)
- Anna Dániel (1908–2003, f/ch/nf)
- József Darvas (1912–1973, nf)
- Zsófia Dénes (1885–1987, nf)
- Tibor Déry (1894–1977, nf/f)
- József Eötvös (1813–1871, nf)
- Renée Erdős (1879–1956, p/f)
- Péter Esterházy (1950–2016, nf/f)
- Kinga Fabó (1953–2021, p/nf)
- Ferenc Faludi (1704–1779, p)
- György Faludy (1910–2006, p/nf)
- Ladislas Farago (1906–1980, nf)
- András Fáy (1786–1864, p/d/f)
- Mihály Fazekas (1766–1828, p/ch)
- Klára Fehér (1919–1996, f/ch)
- István Fekete (1900–1970, f/ch)
- Miksa Fenyő (1877–1972, nf/f)
- Éva Földes (1914–1981, nf)
- Jolán Földes (1902–1963, d/f)
- Milán Füst (1888–1967, f/nf/p)

== G-J ==
- Erzsébet Galgóczi (1930–1989, f/d)
- János Garay (1812–1853, p/f)
- Géza Gárdonyi (1863–1922, f/nf)
- Andor Gellért (1907–1990, nf)
- András Gerevich (born 1976, p)
- Ágnes Gergely (born 1933, f/p)
- Gábor Görgey (1929–2022, p/d/f)
- Alisz Goriupp (1894–1979, nf)
- István Gyöngyösi (1620–1704, p)
- Géza Gyóni (1884–1917, p)
- Béla Hamvas (1897–1968, nf/f)
- Attila Hazai (1967–2012, f/nf)
- Etelka Kenéz Heka (1936–2024, p/f)
- Gáspár Heltai (c. 1490–1574, nf)
- Ferenc Herczeg (1863–1954, d/f)
- Gyula Hernádi (1926–2005, d/f)
- Gyula Hornyánszky (1869–1933, nf)
- Sándor Hunyady (1890–1942, f/d)
- Ignotus (1869–1949, p/f/nf)
- Gyula Illyés (1902–1983, p/f/d)
- Éva Janikovszky (1926–2003, ch/f)
- Ida Jenbach (1868 – c. 1943, nf)
- Mór Jókai (1825–1904, f/d/nf)
- Attila József (1905–1937, p)
- Gyula Juhász (1883–1937, p)
- Vilmos Juhász (1899–1967, nf)

== K ==
- Eduard Kabos (1864–1923, co/d/f)
- Margit Kaffka (1880–1918, f/p/nf)
- László Kálnoky (1912–1985, p)
- Sándor Kányádi (1929–2018, p/ch)
- Teréz Karacs (1808–1892, nf)
- Ferenc Karinthy (1921–1992, f/d/nf)
- Frigyes Karinthy (1887–1938, d/p)
- József Kármán (1769–1795, f/nf)
- György Károly (1953–2018, p/nf)
- Lajos Kassák (1887–1967, p/f/nf)
- József Katona (1791–1830, d/p)
- Ferenc Kazinczy (1759–1831, nf/p)
- Zsigmond Kemény (1814–1875, nf/f)
- Géza Képes (1909–1989, p/nf)
- Rivka Keren (born 1946, f/ch)
- Imre Kertész (1929–2016, p/f), Nobel laureate, 2002
- Annamária Kinde (1956–2014, p/nf)
- Károly Kisfaludy (1788–1830, d)
- Sándor Kisfaludy (1772–1844, p/d)
- Ephraim Kishon (1924–2004, f/nf/d)
- Noémi Kiss (born 1974, f/nf)
- János Kodolányi (1899–1969, f/d/nf)
- Arthur Koestler (1905–1983, f/nf)
- Ferenc Kölcsey (1790–1838, p/nf)
- György Konrád (1933–2019, f/nf)
- Ferenc Körmendi (1900–1972, f)
- Károly Kós (1883–1977, f/nf)
- Dezső Kosztolányi (1885–1936, p/nf/d)
- Helene Kottanner (fl. 15th c, nf)
- Agota Kristof (1935–2011, p/f)
- Žofia Kubini (17th c., p)
- László Krasznahorkai (born 1954, f/d) Man Booker International Prize winner 2015
- Gyula Krúdy (1878–1933, f)

== L–O ==
- László Ladányi (1907–1992, p/f)
- Menyhért Lakatos (1926–2007)
- Miklós László (1903–1973, d)
- Ervin Lázár (1936–2006, f/ch)
- Ágnes Lehóczky (born 1976, p)
- Laura Leiner (born 1985, f)
- Menyhért Lengyel (1880–1974, d)
- Ignatz Lichtenstein (1824–1909, nf)
- László L. Lőrincz (born 1939, f/nf)
- Mária Bajzek Lukács (born 1960, nf)
- Imre Madách (1823–1864, p/d)
- Flóra Majthényi (1837–1915, p)
- Gitta Mallasz (1907–1992, nf)
- Réka Mán-Várhegyi (born 1979, f)
- Iván Mándy (1918–1995, nf)
- Sándor Márai (1900–1989, f/p)
- Béla Markó (born 1951, nf)
- Kati Marton (born 1949, nf)
- Tibor Méray (1924–2020, nf/f)
- Kelemen Mikes (1690–1791, nf)
- Kálmán Mikszáth (1847–1910, f/nf)
- Béláné Mocsáry (1845–1917, nf)
- Ferenc Molnár (1878–1952, d/p)
- Jean-Pierre Montcassen (born 1957, f/p)
- József Molnár (1918–2009, nf)
- Ferenc Móra (1879–1934, f/nf)
- Terézia Mora (born 1971, f)
- Zsigmond Móricz (1879–1942, f)
- Péter Nádas (1942–2026, f/nf)
- Ádám Nádasdy (1947–2026, nf/p)
- Borbála Nádasdy (born 1939, f/nf)
- Ágnes Nemes Nagy (1922–1991, p/nf)
- Gáspár Nagy (1949–2007, p/nf)
- László Németh (1903–1975, f/d/nf)
- Nicolaus Olahus (1493–1568, nf)
- Emma Orczy (1865–1947, f/d)
- István Örkény (1912–1979, d/f)
- Géza Ottlik (1912–1990, nf)

== P–S ==
- Janus Pannonius (1434–1472, p/nf)
- Péter Pázmány (1570–1637, nf)
- András Petőcz (born 1959, nf/p)
- Sándor Petőfi (1823–1849, p)
- György Petri (1943–2000, p)
- Kata Szidónia Petrőczy (1659–1708, nf/p)
- János Pilinszky (1921–1981, p)
- Susan Polgar (born 1969, nf)
- Miklós Radnóti (1909–1944, p)
- Lea Ráskay (fl. early 16th c., nf)
- Kati Rekai (1921–2010, ch)
- Radoslav Rochallyi (born 1980, f/nf/p)
- Endre Rózsa (1941–1995, p)
- Ágnes Rapai (born 1952, p)
- Jenő Rejtő (1905–1943, f/d)
- Ferenc Sánta (1927–2008, f/d)
- Regina Saphier (living, nf)
- György Schwajda (1943–2010, d)
- Kate Seredy (1899–1975, ch)
- Henriett Seth-F. (born 1980, d/f)
- György Spiró (born 1946, d/f/nf)
- András Sütő (1927–2006, f/nf/d)
- Dezső Szabó (1879–1945, f/nf)
- Lőrinc Szabó (1901–1957, p)
- Magda Szabó (1917–2007, f/nf/ch)
- Sándor Szathmári (1897–1974, nf)
- Louis Szathmary (1919–1996, nf)
- István Széchenyi (1791–1860, nf)
- Noémi Szécsi (born 1976, f)
- Júlia Székely (1906–1986, f/nf)
- Mária Szepes (1908–2007, nf/d)
- Antal Szerb (1901–1945, nf), Holocaust victim
- Ede Szigligeti (1814–1878, d)
- Edina Szvoren (born 1974, f)

== T-Z ==
- Judit Dukai Takách (1795–1836, p)
- Áron Tamási (1897–1966, f/d)
- Sebestyén Tinódi Lantos (c. 1510–1556, p/nf)
- Kata Tisza (born 1980, f)
- Mihály Tompa (1819–1868, p/nf)
- Cécile Tormay (1876–1937, f/nf)
- Árpád Tóth (1886–1928, p)
- Kálmán Tóth (1831–1891, p/d)
- Tamás Tűz (1916–1992, p)
- János Vajda (1827–1897, p/nf)
- Miklós Vámos (born 1950, nf/f/d)
- Péter Veres (1897–1970, nf)
- József Vészi (1858–1940, nf/p)
- Mihály Vörösmarty (1800–1855, p/d)
- Albert Wass (1908–1998, f/p)
- Sándor Weöres (1913–1989, p/nf)
- Robert Zend (1929–1985, f/p)
- Lajos Zilahy (1891–1974, f/d)
- Péter Zilahy (born 1970, p/d/f)
- Miklós Zrínyi (1620–1664, p/nf)
- Péter Zsoldos (1930–1997, f)
- Béla Zsolt (1895–1949, d/f/nf)
