= List of Hungarian women writers =

This is a list of women writers who were born in Hungary or whose writings are associated with that country.

== A ==
- Mariska Ady (1888–1977), poet

== B ==
- Mária Bajzek Lukács (born 1960), Hungarian-born, Slovene-language writer, educator and translator
- Zsófia Balla (born 1949) Romanian-born Hungarian poet and essayist
- Linda Vero Ban (born 1976), writer on Jewish identity and spirituality
- Zsófia Bán (born 1957), novelist, literary writer and critic
- Kata Bethlen (1700–1759), memoirist, letter writer and autobiographer
- Janka Boga (1889–1963), playwright and essayist
- Katalin Bogyay (born 1956), politician, non-fiction writer and critic
- Edith Bone (1889–1975), journalist and autobiographer
- Ágota Bozai (born 1965), novelist and translator
- Edith Bruck (born 1932), novelist and playwright writing in Italian
- Zsuzsanna Budapest (born 1940), Hungarian-born American journalist, playwright and feminist

== D ==
- Anna Dániel (1908–2003), novelist, children's writer and historian

== E ==
- Renée Erdős (1879–1956), poet and novelist

== F ==
- Kinga Fabó (1953–2021), poet, essayist and linguist
- Klára Fehér (1919–1996), novelist and children's writer
- Éva Földes (1914–1981), epic works Olympic medallist for Der Jugendquell (Well of Youth)
- Flora Frangepán (fl. 1743), writer and translator

== G ==
- Erzsébet Galgóczi (1930–1989), short story writer, playwright and screenwriter
- Antonine de Gérando (1844-1914), translator, non-fiction writer and educator
- Ágnes Gergely (born 1933), novelist, poet and translator
- Alisz Goriupp (1894–1979), librarian and bibliographer

== J ==
- Éva Janikovszky (1926–2003), novelist and children's writer
- Ida Jenbach (1868 – c.1943), German-language journalist and screenwriter

== K ==
- Margit Kaffka (1880–1918), poet, novelist and memoirist
- Teréz Karacs (1808–1892), memoirist and women's rights activist
- Etelka Kenéz Heka (1936–2024), writer, poet and singer
- Rivka Keren (born 1946), fiction and children's writer in Hungarian and Hebrew
- Annamária Kinde (1956–2014), Romanian-born Hungarian poet and journalist
- Noémi Kiss (born 1974), short story writer and essayist
- Helene Kottanner (15th c.), German-language memoirist
- Agota Kristof (1935–2011), French-language poet, novelist and short story writer
- Žofia Kubini (17th c.), poet writing in old Czech

== L ==
- Ágnes Lehóczky (born 1976), poet
- Laura Leiner (born 1985), novelist

== M ==
- Gitta Mallasz (1907–1992), mystical writer
- Réka Mán-Várhegyi (born 1979), fiction writer
- Kati Marton (born 1949), Hungarian-American journalist and non-fiction writer
- Béláné Mocsáry (1845–1917), Hungarian geographer and travel writer
- Terézia Mora (born 1971), German-language fiction writer

== N ==
- Borbála Nádasdy (born 1939), novelist, memoirist and ballet master
- Ágnes Nemes Nagy (1922–1991), poet, translator and educator

== O ==
- Emma Orczy (1865–1947), Hungarian-born novelist and playwright writing in English

== P ==
- Kata Szidónia Petrőczy (1659–1708), Hungarian Baroque prose writer and poet
- Susan Polgar (born 1969), chess writer and champion

== R ==
- Ágnes Rapai (born 1952), poet writing in Hungarian and German
- Lea Ráskay (early 16th century), manuscript copier, translator and nun
- Kati Rekai (1921–2010), Hungarian-born English-language children's writer

== S ==
- Regina Saphier, writer, blogger, and TED video subtitle translator
- Kate Seredy (1899–1975), Hungarian-born English-language children's writer and illustrator
- Henriett Seth F. (real name Henrietta Fajcsák, born 1980), autistic poet, writer and artist
- Magda Szabó (1917–2007), novelist, playwright and poet
- Noémi Szécsi (born 1976), novelist and translator
- Júlia Székely (1906–1986), novelist, biographer and musician
- Mária Szepes (1908–2007), novelist, autobiographer and screenwriter
- Edina Szvoren (born 1974), novelist

== T ==
- Judit Dukai Takách (wrote as Malvina, 1795–1836), poet
- Kata Tisza (born 1980), novelist
- Cécile Tormay (1876–1937), fiction writer and translator

== U ==
- Ida Urr (1904–1989), poet and physician (born in Czechoslovakia)

== See also ==
- List of women writers
- List of Hungarian writers
