= Tuz =

Tuz (Turkish: salt) or TUZ may refer to:

== Toponyms ==
- Tuz, Montenegro, a town
- Tuz Khurmatu, a town in Iraq
- Lake Tuz, hypersaline lake in Turkey
- Tuz (Akkuly District), a lake in Pavlodar Region, Kazakhstan

== People ==
- Jiří Tuž (born 2004), Czech cross-country skier
- Tamás Tűz (1916–1992), Hungarian poet

== Other uses ==
- Tuz resmi, a tax on salt in the Ottoman Empire
- Tuz SC, an Iraqi sports club
- The mascot of the 2009 linux.conf.au conference; see Tux (mascot) § Tuz 2009

== See also ==
- Tuzkol (disambiguation)
- Tuzla (disambiguation)
