= Fran Krsto Frankopan =

Croatian baroque poet, nobleman and politician

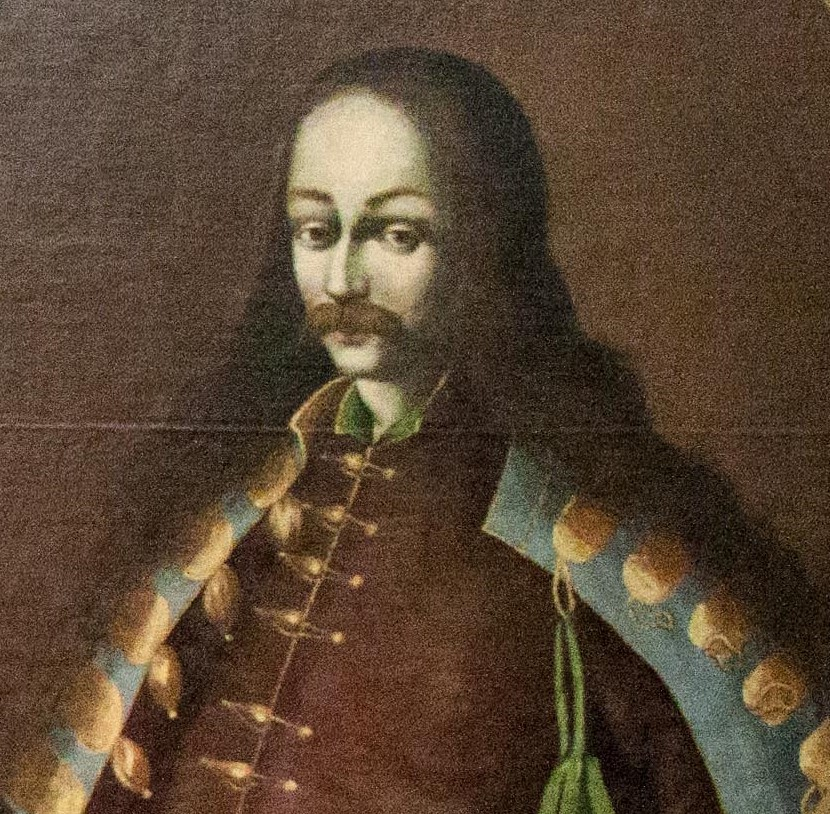
- Portrait in 1671, at the time of his execution. Painting preserved in the Hungarian National Museum
- Born: 4 March 1643; Bosiljevo, Croatia, Habsburg monarchy (modern Croatia)
- Died: 30 April 1671 (aged 28); Wiener Neustadt, Austria, Habsburg monarchy (modern Austria)
- Resting place: Zagreb Cathedral, Croatia
- Occupations: Poet, politician
- Writing career
- Language: Croatian
- Notable works: Elegia; Gartlic za čas kratiti

Fran Krsto Frankopan (Hungarian: Frangepán Ferenc Kristóf; 4 March 1643 – 30 April 1671) was a Croatian baroque poet, nobleman and politician. He is remembered primarily for his involvement in the failed Zrinski-Frankopan conspiracy. He was a Croatian marquess, a member of the Frankopan noble family and its last male descendant.

== Biography ==
=== Early life ===
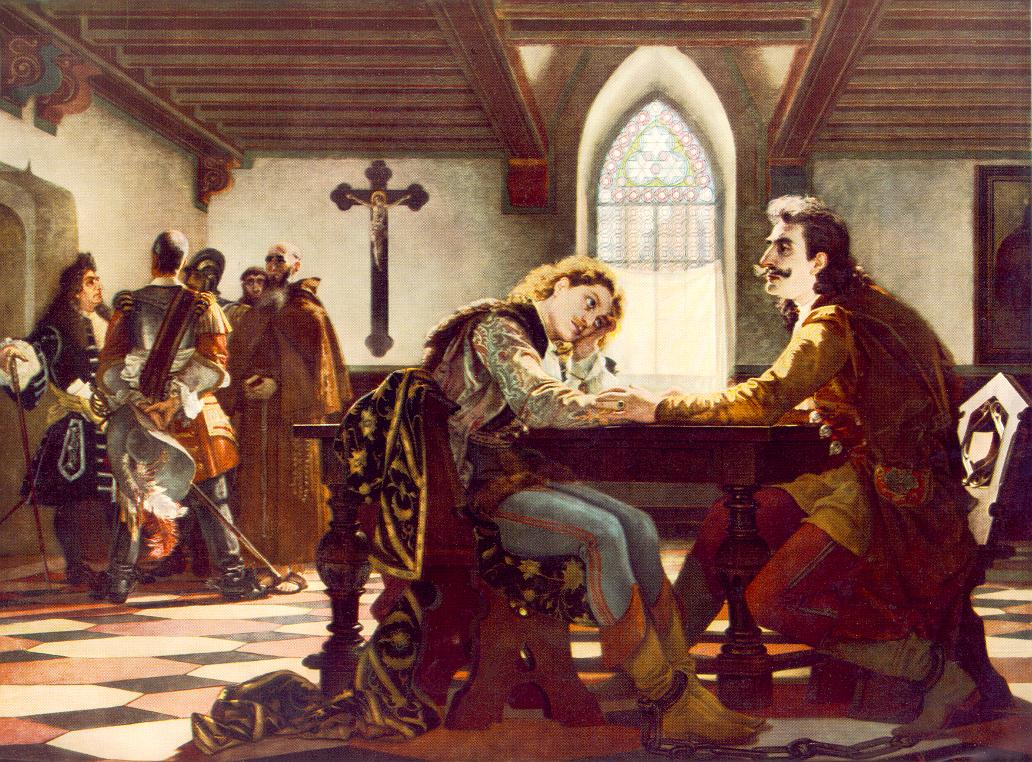
Fran Krsto Frankopan with Petar Zrinski

Frankopan was Born in Bosiljevo, Croatia, as the son of Vuk II Krsto Frankopan and his third wife Dorothea Maria Haller von Hallerstein(b. 1608- d. 1659). Frankopan's maternal grandparents were Hans Georg von Haller von Hallerstein, councillor in Carniola and counsellor of Charles of Austria and Susanna von Schneeweiß von Frauheim. Frankopan's paternal grandparents were Gašpar I Frankopan and Katarina Lenković, daughter of Ivan Lenković, Uskoks leader

Frankopan was twenty years younger than his half-siblings from his father's previous marriages; Gaspar, Juraj and Katarina. From his mother's first marriage to Rudolf Paradeiser von Neuhaus, Frankopan also had two older half sisters, Eva Franziska and Maria Kunigunde, and three half-brothers Johann Ernst, Georg Sigismund and Johann Jacob.

Frankopans childhood is thought to have mainly been spent in Novigrad na Dobri, the Frankopan family also owned a castle in Severin na Kupi where its possible Frankopan also visited alongside his father.

Not much is known about his childhood but Frankopan as member of the educated Croatian nobility, would have spoken German and Italian in his everyday life. Unusually for his class Frankopan also grew up speaking both the Croatian and Slovenian languages, both of which he later would also write in.

Education

Following the death of his father in 1652, Frankopan was sent to be schooled in Zagreb, at the Jesuit academy. Frankopan lived at today's Habdelić street in the Upper Town, before continuing his education in Italy. There Frankopan published his first poetic work in Latin, Elegia, aged 13, in 1656.

The poem details the legendary transfer of the House of the Holy Family from Palestine to Trsat, and then to Loreto. Thematically, the Elegy directly connects to the well-known Marian cult of the Black Madonna, that is, Mary of Loreto, of which the Frankopan family had played a significant part in popularizing. Frankopan supposedly composed it during his stay in Loreto, and it was published in 1656 in Macerata under the title Querimoniae piae.

==== Inheritance and marriage ====
During Frankopan's stay in Italy, the last member of the Roman branch of the Frangipane, Mario Frangipane having no heirs decided that he wanted to leave his assets to the Veglian branch of which Frankopan belonged and was the last heir of. But Roman law at the time prohibited foreigners from inheriting property held by citizens of the Papal States. Frankopan was a foreign citizen, and the law opposed Frangipani's will and therefore a way had to be found to overcome this inheritance law. As early as 1638, Frangipani had made a will, in which he named Cardinal Antonio Barberini as his heir general. Barberini was then given instructions to ensure that the Frangipane inheritance would not leave the family, but be passed on to the Frangipani of Hungary and Croatia.

Frangipani died in 1654 and the title of Marquis of Nemi and all of his fortune was left to Frankopan and on that matter he traveled to Rome. Frangipane as previously mentioned made the cardinal Barberini the executor of his will;Barberini then, it is thought, arranged for Frankopan to marry a Barberini connection, Giulia Naro.

Naro is sometimes referred to as a niece of Cardinal Barberini, but in reality she was his first cousin once removed and a daughter of his cousin Lucrezia Macchiavelli (daughter of Barberini's maternal aunt Maria Magalotti) and Bernardino Naro, Marchese di Mompeo. Not only connected to the powerful Barberinis, members of the Naro family held many offices under the popes Urban VIII and Innocent X, with Frankopan's father-in-law having been appointed Gonfalonier of the Church in 1638.

In 1658, Frankopan and Naro were betrothed; they married on 7 October 1660.

==== Return to Croatia ====
Frankopan and his wife returned to Croatia in 1661–1662, where the couple took up residence on Frankopan's estate in Brežice. In 1663 Frankopan took part in the Battle at Jurjeve Stijene near Otočac, in which the Croatian army led by his brother-in-law, Péter Zrínyi, defeated the forces of the Ottoman Empire led by Ali-Pasha Čengić of the Eyalet of Bosnia.

In 1666–67, Frankopan restored and strengthened the castle of Novigrad. Enjoying the title and income that came with the captaincy of Ogulin, he also wanted to obtain the captaincy of Zengg, which was prevented by the Austrian military administration in 1669, Frankopan lost the captaincy of Ogulin; a position which had belonged to both his father and grandfather.

===== Peace of Vasvár =====
Both Frankopan and his brother-in-law Ban (viceroy) Petar Zrinski were described as competent statesmen and prolific writers. They had seen successes in negotiating and liberating the ethnic Hungarian and Croatian areas occupied by the Ottoman Empire. However, the Viennese military council, wishing to curb the Hungarian influence in the Monarchy, decided to ultimately sign a peace treaty with the Ottomans, by which the liberated territories had to be ceded back to the Ottoman Empire. Hungarian and Croatian nobles saw the resulting peace treaty, the Peace of Vasvár, as utterly unfavourable and disgraceful to their interests. In response, Frankopan and Zrinski decided to join the Magnate conspiracy, and raise a rebellion against the Holy Roman Emperor, Leopold I

==== Arrest and imprisonment of Frankopan and Zrinski ====
Frankopan and Zrinski were lured to Vienna with promises of safety and clemency but Immediately on their arrival April 1670 they were arrested in and imprisoned in Wiener Neustadt.

A few days later on April 26, the Venetian diplomat Marino Zorzi, reported to the Venetian government that although the two men were kept under guard and not allowed to socialize with each other, " they were housed...with the most noble treatment; company visiting and meals is not prohibited, nor is it carried out with imaginable rigor."

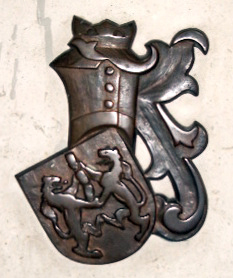
Coat of arms of Fran Krsto Frankopan

=== Death ===
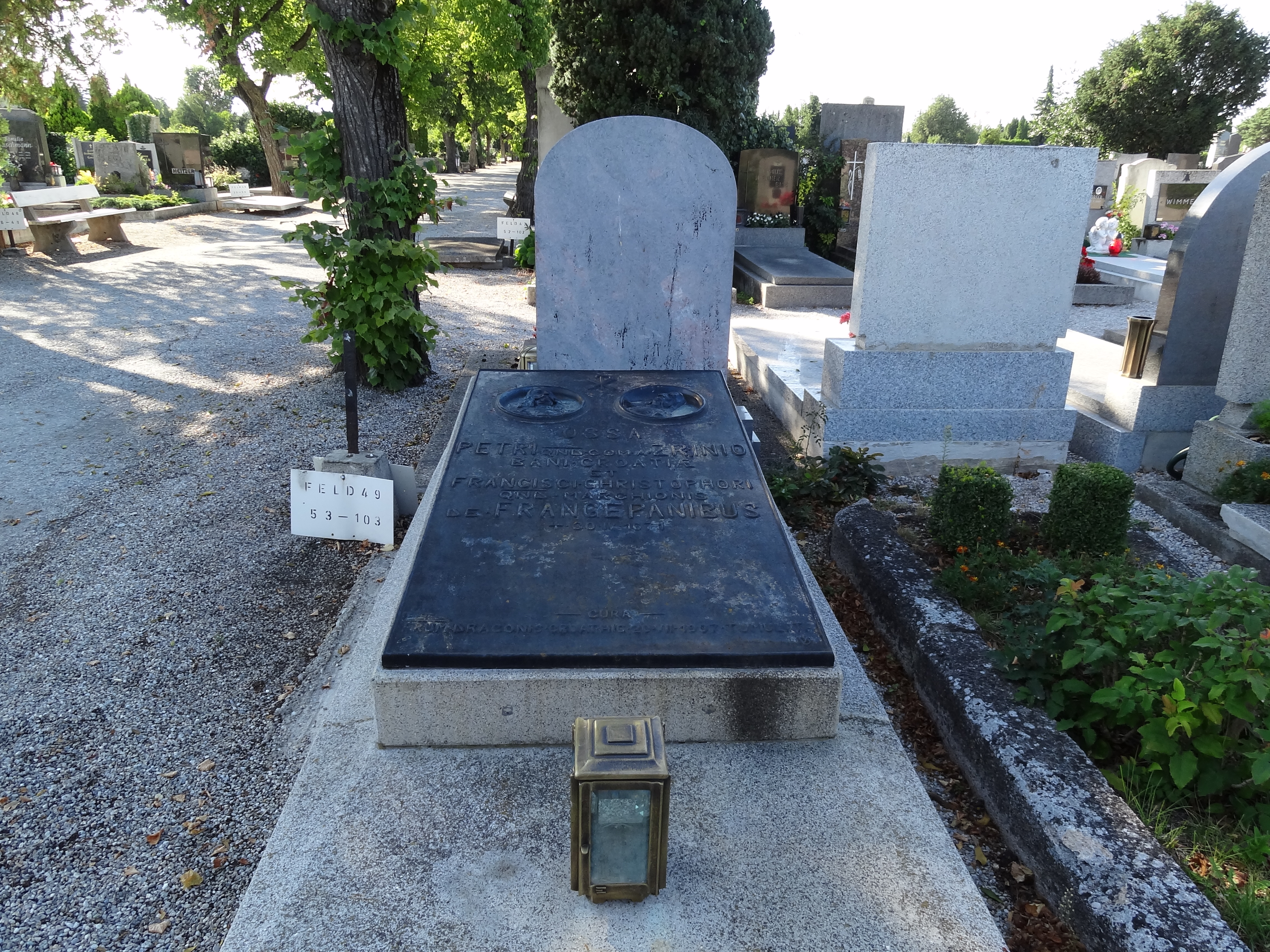
Tombstone of Petar Zrinski and Fran Krsto Frankopan in Wiener Neustadt

As a punishment for sedition, they were sentenced to be executed in Wiener Neustadt in 1671. The manner of execution was decapitation by sword, a privilegie accorded only to those of the nobility. As convicted of high treason and lèse-majesté Frankopan's right hand was also to be cut off.

Before his death, Frankopan wrote a final letter to his wife.

"Dearest and most beloved, Julia my dear, since by the will of Heaven and God's decree I must go from this life to the next, in reparation for my evil deeds against His Majesty, my most merciful Emperor, I would like to embrace you with a few of these lines from the bottom of my heart and give you the last Farewell. I beg you, my dear Juliet, for the love of Christ, to forgive me through Christian mercy that you have been forced to endure insults and sufferings because of my recklessness. Also, Julia, my dear, I most humbly ask you forgiveness for every, even the slightest, offense that I have caused you during our marriage. I, for my part, have forgiven with all my heart and soul and erased any discomfort you may have given me, even though they were only expressions of your pure and true love for me.

— Fran Krsto Frankopan

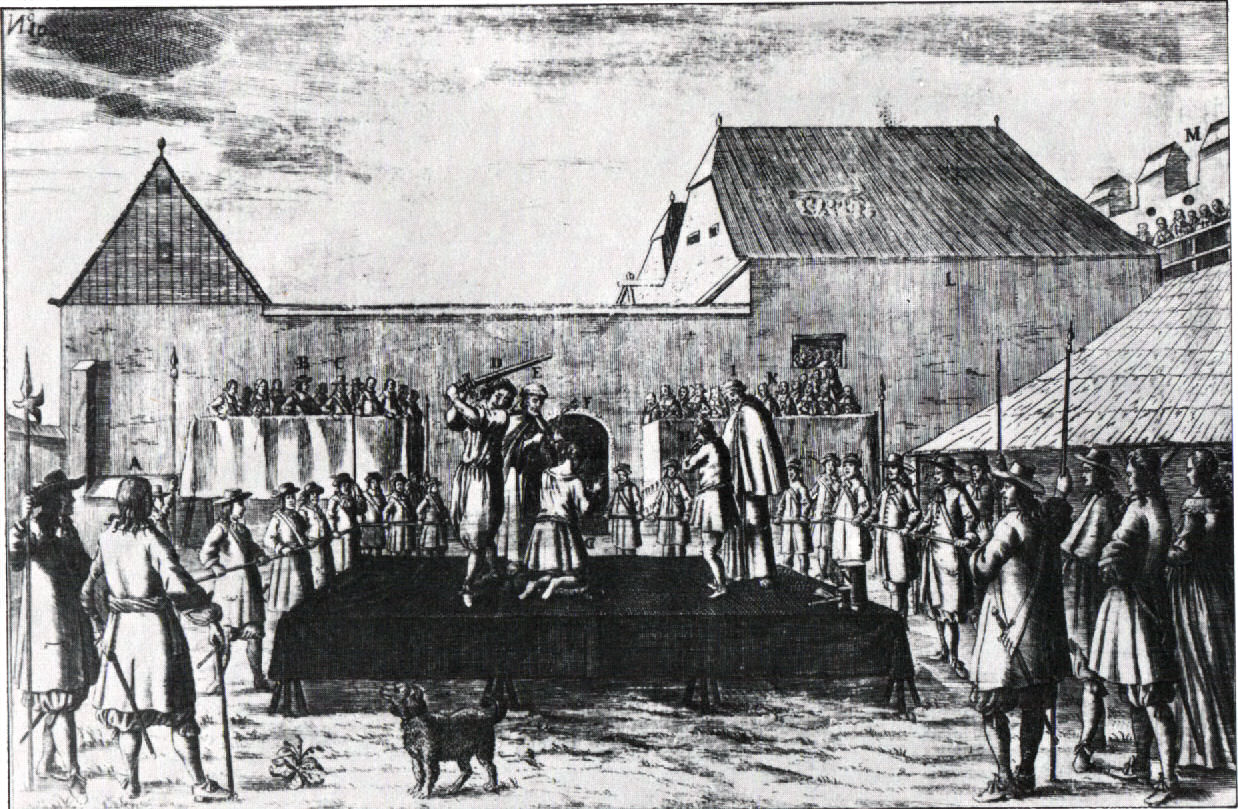
Engraving of the execution of Fran Krsto Frankopan and Peter Zrinski in Wiener Neustadt

The two castles belonging to Frankopan, Novigrad and Severin castles were looted 1670 by the troops of baron Friedrich Sauer, vice general of Karlovac.

Giulia, afraid of being accused of being complicit with her husband's actions, when she learned of Frankopan's imprisonment, hired a ship and removed from the Bosilievo and Novi castles "cupboards, chests, silver, gold, precious stones, movables and household goods, which were worth many thousands and thousands of scudi".

Naro also took with her many of the Frankopan family documents.

Naro then fled to Venice, accompanied by Orfeo Frangipane (son of Pietro Urbano Frangipane), where they took refuge with a relative of Frangipane, count Francesco Valvasone di Rosacis. (Frangipane's mother was Elena Valvasone di Maniago.)

Frangipane himself left secretly in order to escape to France, leaving Naro in an uncertain situation and with the authorities of Venice receiving demands from officials of the Holy Roman Empire to hand over Naro. The cardinal Lazarrio Pallavicino advocated on her behalf with to receive some of her deceased husband's assets as "she had nothing".

Naro eventually managed to leave Venice and make her way to Rome, where she entered a Carmelite convent, Santissima Incarnazione del Divino Verbo where she lived until her death on January 28. 1721.

The couple had no known surviving children, though its been claimed that they had a son who died young and a daughter, who entered a convent in Bratislava under the surname Flora Dzolyi after the execution of her father.

A painting said to depict Julia Naro Frankopan as St. Julia is located in the church of the Holy Trinity (Croatian: crkva Sv. Trojstva) in Novi Vinodolski.

The deaths of Zrinski and Frankopan caused outrage among Croatian nobles. Zrinski and Frankopan did not even try to answer the court in Vienna on the terms in which Vienna dealt with them, but rather wished to counteract its injustices with what was then quite justifiable diplomacy. Viennese officials later recognized that the main reason for the rebellion was the dissatisfaction among Hungarians and Croats prompted by the unfavorable Peace of Vasvár, rather than unprovoked sedition.

The remains of Fran Krsto Frankopan and Petar Zrinski were handed over to the Croatian authorities and buried in the Zagreb Cathedral in 1919, following World War I.

=== Poet ===
Frankopan underwent various poetic influences, none of which was able to deafen his own inspiration. In such a vein was written his The Garden in which to Cheat Time (Gartlic za čas kratiti), a personal account of the poet's experiences while in prison.

Living in an area bordering on several Croatian dialects, Frankopan mainly wrote his poetry in the Kajkavian-ikavian dialect of Croatian (as seen in his poem Srića daje kaj misal ne zgaje). In prison, Frankopan translated Molière's Georges Dandin, the first translation into Slovenian and any Slavic language.

Along with Petar Zrinski, his brother Nikola, Frankopan and his sister Katarina (Petar's wife), contributed various works of poetry and prose to 17th century Croatian literature.

==== Ozalj Linguistic-Literary Circle ====
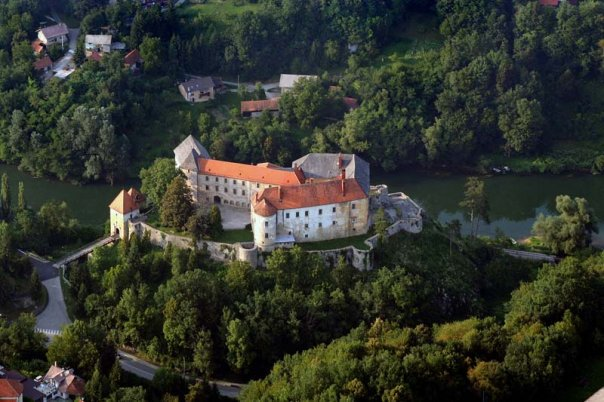
Ozalj castle (Croatian: Stari grad Ozalj or Gradina Ozalj)

Frankopan and Zrinski were also involved with the Ozalj Linguistic-Literary Circle, which had its headquarters at Ozalj castle. It members were inspired by the ideas of Glagolitic writers such as Franjo Glavinić, the aim of the circle was to combine the three Croatian dialects; kajkavian, chakavian and shtokavian, together into a common language. It was the belief of the circle that by the standardization of the Croatian language this would bring about cultural unity among Croatians.

Other members of this circle was Ivan Belostenec, Juraj Križanić and Juraj Rattkaj.

== List of works ==
From the following list only Elegia was published during Frankopan's lifetime, the rest was found in manuscript following his execution at Wiener Neustadt.

=== Lyric ===
- Elegia (1656), written in Latin
- Gartlic za čas kratiti, completed c. 1671
- Various pious poems
- Zganke za vrime kratiti
- Sentencije vsakojaške

=== Prose ===
- Trumbita sudnjega dneva
- Preljubljeno zlato i izabranice moga srca

=== Drama ===
- Jarne bogati (translation from Moliere)

== Legacy ==
The portraits of Frankopan and Zrinski are depicted on the obverse of the Croatian 5 kuna banknote, issued in 1993 and 2001.

His poems are still popular and are written in a combination of all three Croatian dialects: štokavian, kajkavian and čakavian. This type of writing was also regular for other writers of the Croatian Baroque Ozalj Literary Circle: Ana Katarina Zrinski and Petar IV Zrinski.

== Quotes ==
He who dies honorably lives forever.

— Fran Krsto Frankopan, Conscription

Is it possible, Almighty Creator, that such injustice oppresses your country?

— Fran Krsto Frankopan

== See also ==
- Zrinski-Frankopan conspiracy
- MT Frankopan
