= Kinde =

Kinde may refer to:

- Kinde, Michigan, United States
- kinde, a type of arched harp found in Chad
- kinde, an archaic spelling of "kind". See Kindness

== People with the surname ==
- Annamária Kinde (1956–2014), Romanian-born Hungarian journalist, poet and editor
- Per Kinde (1887–1924), Swedish sport shooter
