= Frankopan (disambiguation) =

The House of Frankopan was a Croatian noble family.

Frankopan may also refer to:

- MT Frankopan, Croatian crude oil tanker
- Frankopan Castle, located in Krk, Croatia

== See also ==
- Frangipani family, a powerful Roman patrician clan in the Middle Ages
