= Orávka =

Orávka Kacagópuszta
- Municipality
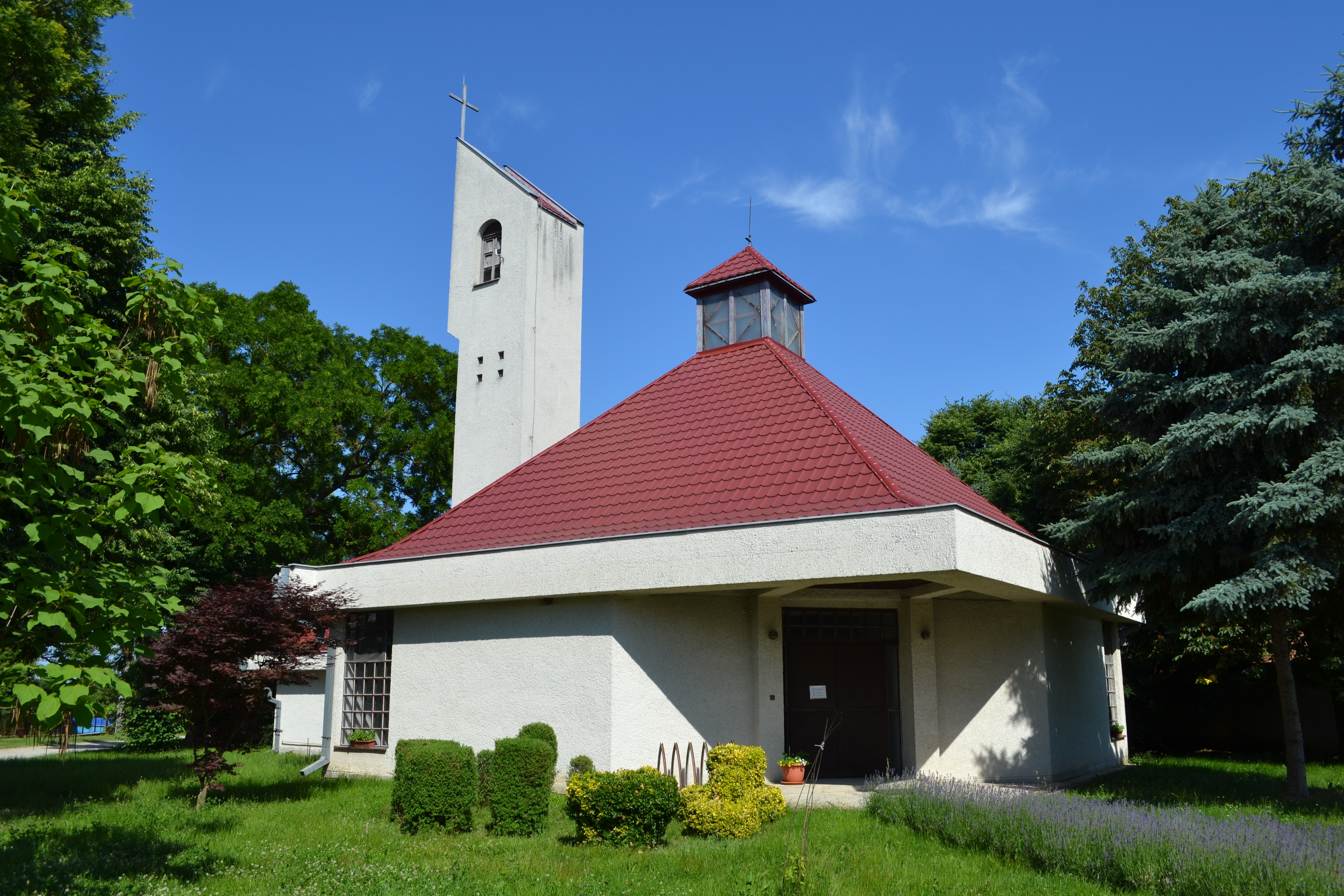

- Flag

- Location of Orávka in the Banská Bystrica Region Location of Orávka in Slovakia
- Coordinates: 48.31°N 20.19°E
- Country: Slovakia
- Region: Banská Bystrica Region
- District: Rimavská Sobota District
- First mentioned: 1922

Area
  - Total: 7.18 km^{2} (2.77 sq mi)
- Elevation: 179 m (587 ft)

Population (2025)
  - Total: 155
- Time zone: UTC+1 (CET)
  - Summer (DST): UTC+2 (CEST)
- Postal code: 980 42
- Area code: +421 47
- Vehicle registration plate (until 2022): RS
- Website: www.oravka.sk

Orávka (Hungarian: Kacagópuszta) is a village and municipality in the Rimavská Sobota District of the Banská Bystrica Region of southern Slovakia. Village is located ca. 15 km southeast from district capital Rimavská Sobota. In Orávka is train stop, public library, foodstuff store and a pub. Main village dominant is a church from 1995.

== Geography ==
The municipality lies at an altitude of 179 metres (587 ft) and covers an area of 7.18 km^{2} (2.77 sq mi) (2025).

== Population ==
Population statistic (10 years)
Year	1995	2005	2015	2025
Count	187	161	163	155
Difference		−13.90%	+1.24%	−4.90%

Population statistic
Year	2024	2025
Count	152	155
Difference		+1.97%

It has a population of 155 people (31 December 2025).

=== Ethnicity ===
Census 2021 (1+ %)
Ethnicity	Number	Fraction
Slovak	142	88.19%
Hungarian	13	8.07%
Not found out	5	3.1%
Total	161	

In year 2021 was 161 people by ethnicity 142 as Slovak, 13 as Hungarian, 5 as Not found out, 1 as Romani and 1 as Polish.

Note on population: The difference values of population numbers in the table "Population statistic" and in the sections "Ethnicity" & "Religion" is caused by the use of various statistical methods.

=== Religion ===
Census 2021 (1+ %)
Religion	Number	Fraction
Roman Catholic Church	73	45.34%
None	63	39.13%
Not found out	7	4.35%
Evangelical Church	5	3.11%
Seventh-day Adventist Church	5	3.11%
Calvinist Church	2	1.24%
Other	2	1.24%
Greek Catholic Church	2	1.24%
Total	161	

In year 2021 was 161 people by religion 73 from Roman Catholic Church, 63 from None, 7 from Not found out, 5 from Evangelical Church, 5 from Seventh-day Adventist Church, 2 from Calvinist Church, 2 from Other, 2 from Greek Catholic Church, 1 from Buddhism and 1 from Ad hoc movements.
