= Zacharovce =

Zacharovce Zeherje
- Municipality
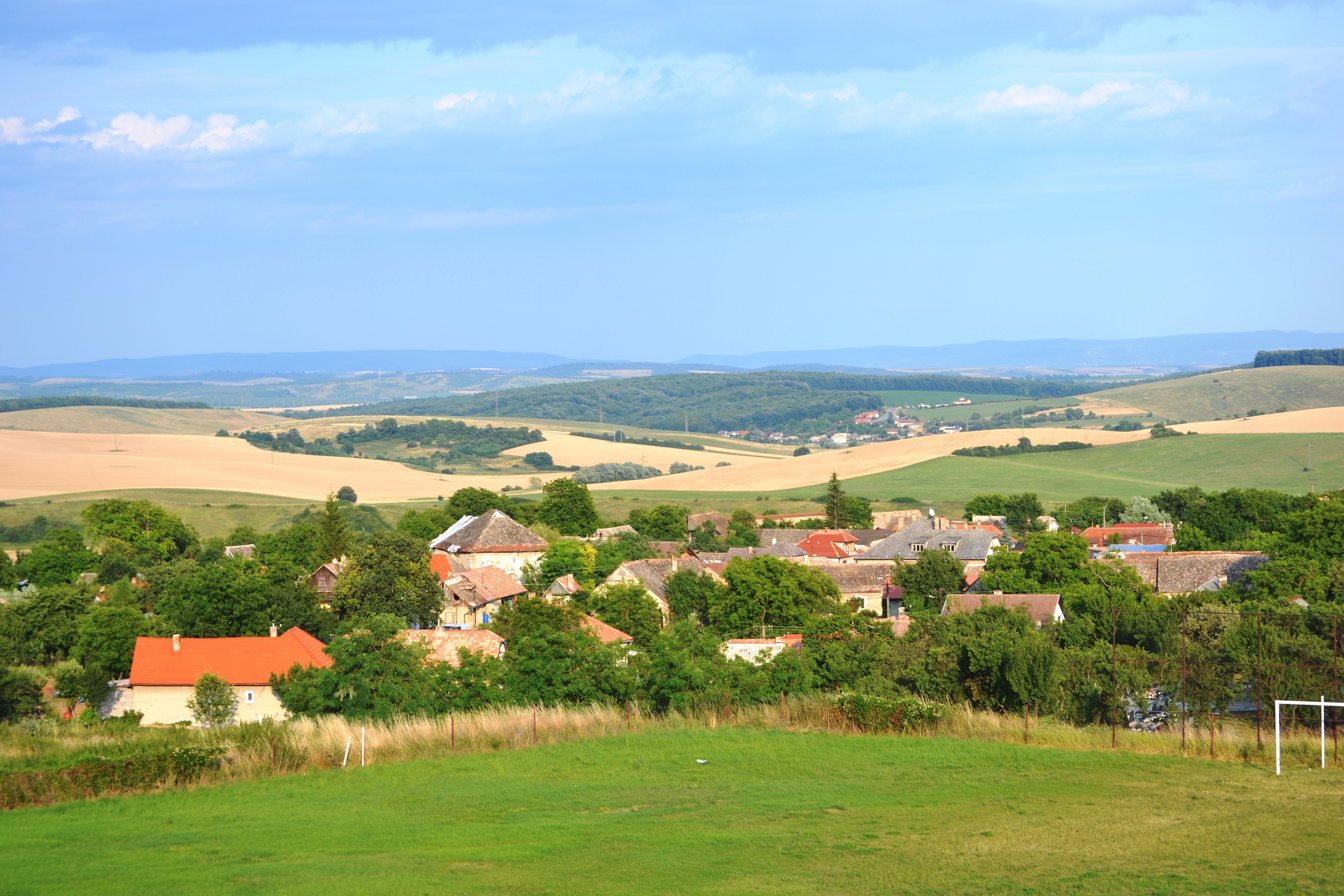

- Location of Zacharovce in the Banská Bystrica Region Location of Zacharovce in Slovakia
- Coordinates: 48.42°N 20.05°E
- Country: Slovakia
- Region: Banská Bystrica Region
- District: Rimavská Sobota District
- First mentioned: 1320

Area
  - Total: 6.81 km^{2} (2.63 sq mi)
- Elevation: 294 m (965 ft)

Population (2025)
  - Total: 378
- Time zone: UTC+1 (CET)
  - Summer (DST): UTC+2 (CEST)
- Postal code: 979 01
- Area code: +421 47
- Vehicle registration plate (until 2022): RS
- Website: obeczacharovce.estranky.sk

Zacharovce (Hungarian: Zeherje) is a village and municipality in the Rimavská Sobota District of the Banská Bystrica Region of southern Slovakia. Located near the main road I/50, connecting Zvolen and Košice, the village is now more a living neighbourhood of Rimavská Sobota, where many citizens go for work. The most important sightseeing attraction is a Gothic church from the 15th century, later rebuilt.

== Geography ==
The municipality lies at an altitude of 294 metres (965 ft) and covers an area of 6.81 km^{2} (2.63 sq mi) (2025).

== Population ==
Population statistic (10 years)
| Year | 1995 | 2005 | 2015 | 2025 |
|---|---|---|---|---|
| Count | 367 | 403 | 400 | 378 |
| Difference | | +9.80% | −0.74% | −5.5% |

Population statistic
| Year | 2024 | 2025 |
|---|---|---|
| Count | 382 | 378 |
| Difference | | −1.04% |

It has a population of 378 people (31 December 2025).

=== Ethnicity ===
Census 2021 (1+ %)
| Ethnicity | Number | Fraction |
|---|---|---|
| Slovak | 293 | 75.12% |
| Hungarian | 114 | 29.23% |
| Romani | 45 | 11.53% |
| Not found out | 6 | 1.53% |
| Total | 390 | |

In year 2021 was 390 people by ethnicity 293 as Slovak, 114 as Hungarian, 45 as Romani and 6 as Not found out.

Note on population: The difference values of population numbers in the table "Population statistic" and in the sections "Ethnicity" & "Religion" is caused by the use of various statistical methods.

=== Religion ===
Census 2021 (1+ %)
| Religion | Number | Fraction |
|---|---|---|
| None | 180 | 46.15% |
| Roman Catholic Church | 155 | 39.74% |
| Calvinist Church | 27 | 6.92% |
| Not found out | 13 | 3.33% |
| Evangelical Church | 6 | 1.54% |
| Total | 390 | |

In year 2021 was 390 people by religion 180 from None, 155 from Roman Catholic Church, 27 from Calvinist Church, 13 from Not found out, 6 from Evangelical Church, 3 from Jehovah's Witnesses, 3 from Greek Catholic Church, 2 from Christian Congregations in Slovakia and 1 from Buddhism.
