= Zsolt Komlósy =

Slovak politician (1955–2005)

Member of the National Council
- In office 15 October 2002 – 8 July 2005
- In office 23 June 1992 – 29 October 1998

Personal details
- Born: 11 July 1955 Rimavská Sobota, Czechoslovakia
- Died: 8 July 2005 (aged 49) Virt, Slovakia
- Party: Coexistence (1992–1998); Hungarian Coalition Party (since 1998)
- Children: 1
- Education: Pavol Jozef Šafárik University; Slovak University of Agriculture

Zsolt Komlósy (11 July 1955 – 8 July 2005) was a Slovak politician. He served as a Member of the National Council of Slovakia from 1992 to 1998 and again from 2002 until his death.

== Biography ==
Zsolt Komlósy was born on 11 July 1955 in Rimavská Sobota to a Hungarian family. In 1979 he graduated in theoretical cybernetics from the Pavol Jozef Šafárik University. Afterwards, he studied economics at the Slovak University of Agriculture. Afterwards, he participated in projects related to introduction of computers in agriculture.

Komlósy became politically active in 1992, when he was elected to parliament on the list of the Coexistence party. He lost his seat after the dissolution of the party in 1998 but won the mandate again in the 2002 Slovak parliamentary election on the list of the Party of the Hungarian Coalition.

Komplósy died at the age of 49 as a result of a stroke he suffered at an event organized by the Party of the Hungarian Coalition in the Virt village on 8 July 2005. His death started a political crisis as the opposition led by Direction – Social Democracy repeatedly blocked the swearing in of Komplósy's replacement Pál Keszegh, thus depriving the government of its one-seat majority.

Komlósy was married, with one daughter.
