= List of cultural monuments in Rimavská Sobota =

That list contains the 37 buildings and structures officially designated as cultural monuments in Rimavská Sobota, Slovakia.

Photography	Name	Register number ÚSKP	Address/Coordinates	Notes
	Wooden church	609-947/0	Dúžava = 48°21′6.52″N 19°59′20.51″E	
	Belfry	609-948/0	Dúžava = 48°21′4.1″N 19°59′29.44″E	
	Church	609-3415/0	Mojín = 48°20′29.65″N 19°58′19.85″E	
	Burgher's house	609-3466/0	B. Bartók street 1 = 48°22′57.68″N 20°0′53.6″E	
	Grammar school commemorative	609-1005/1	B. Bartók street 20 = 48°22′54.16″N 20°1′8.22″E	
	Memorial plaque	609-1005/2	B. Bartók street 20 = 48°22′54.16″N 20°1′8.22″E	
	School-house	609-3414/0	J. Botto street 13 = 48°22′54.19″N 20°1′33.6″E	
	Tomb	609-10951/0	Cintorínska street = 48°23′19″N 20°1′47.06″E	Benkó family tomb
	Church	609-999/0	Cukrovarská street 43 = 48°23′9.2″N 20°0′47.88″E	
	Grammar school	609-3412/0	Daxner street 42 = 48°23′13.34″N 20°1′7.93″E	
	Burgher's house	609-3406/0	Hatvanyi street 1 = 48°23′3.16″N 20°0′57.92″E	
	Catholic church	609-998/0	Main square 1 = 48°23′1.22″N 20°1′4.06″E	
	Office building	609-3402/0	Main square 1 = 48°23′2.94″N 20°1′4.3″E	
	Reformed Church	609-1000/0	Main square 2 = 48°22′58.26″N 20°1′1.88″E	
	Town hall	609-1004/0	Main Square 2 = 48°23′2.51″N 20°1′5.09″E	
	Burgher's house	609-3403/0	Main square 4 = 48°23′1.36″N 20°1′6.64″E	
	County house commemorative	609-2931/1	Main square 8 = 48°22′59.05″N 20°1′6.35″E	Today - Library of Matej Hrebenda
	Memorial plaque	609-2931/2	Main square 8 =	
	Reduta	609-1001/0	Main square 19 = 48°23′0.53″N 20°1′0.19″E	
	Burgher's house	609-3404/0	Main square 20 = 48°23′1.68″N 20°1′0.66″E	
	Burgher's house	609-3405/0	Main square 28 = 48°23′2.47″N 20°1′2.42″E	
	Catholic rectory	609-1003/0	Main square 29 = 48°19′32.78″N 19°39′58.02″E	
	Hotel	609-3407/0	SNP street 1 = 48°23′0.74″N 20°1′7.54″E	Hotel Tatra
	Burgher's house	609-3408/0	SNP street 9 = 48°23′4.52″N 20°1′15.53″E	
	Burgher's house	609-3409/0	SNP street 14 = 48°23′2.4″N 20°1′12.32″E	
	Grammar school	609-3413/0	Šrobár street 12 = 48°22′54.01″N 20°1′22.12″E	Today - Elementary school
	Burgher's house	609-3410/0	Tomašík street 2 = 48°23′2.83″N 20°0′58.39″E	
	Burgher's house	609-1006/0	Tomašík street 6 = 48°23′4.27″N 20°1′1.2″E	
	Memorial house	609-1070/1	Tomašík street 21 = 48°23′5.28″N 20°1′2.32″E	
	Memorial plaque	609-1070/2	Tomašík street 21 = 48°23′5.28″N 20°1′2.32″E	Sándor Petőfi memorial plaque
	Memorial	609-1068/0	Mihaly Tompa square = 48°23′4.42″N 20°1′20.57″E	Mihaly Tompa statue
	Home county	609-1002/0	Mihaly Tompa square 9 = 48°23′4.16″N 20°1′22.62″E	
	artillery barracks	609-3411/0	Mihaly Tompa square 44 = 48°23′3.37″N 20°1′17.76″E	Today - Museum
	Mansion	609-1007/1	Tomášovská street 61 = 48°22′31.04″N 20°1′18.79″E	
	Park	609-1007/2	Tomášovská street = 48°22′31.87″N 20°0′19.55″E	
	Church	609-3416/0	Vyšná Pokoradz = 48°25′1.2″N 20°1′1.7″E	Evangelical church
	Belfry	609-11489/0	Vyšná Pokoradz = 48°25′7.5″N 20°1′6.89″E	
	St John the Baptist's Church		48°23′7.98″N 20°1′2.18″E	

== Sources ==
- English translation of the Slovak Wikipedia
