= St John the Baptist's Church (Rimavská Sobota) =

Church in Rimavská Sobota, Slovakia

Coordinates: 48°23′7.98″N 20°1′2.18″E

St John the Baptist's Church is a Roman Catholic church in Rimavská Sobota, Slovakia.

The church, dedicated to John the Baptist (Ján Krstiteľ), was first built in the 11th century and dominated the medieval square of the town. The original building, along with the rest of the town, was destroyed in the catastrophic fire of 1506, and rebuilt.

This second church building was mostly demolished in the late 18th century and replaced between 1774 and 1790 by a single-aisled church in Neo-Classical style, with some late Baroque elements.

The three-storied tower, with a Baroque "lantern" top set in the volute-gabled west front, survives from the previous building.
