= István Ferenczy =

Hungarian sculptor

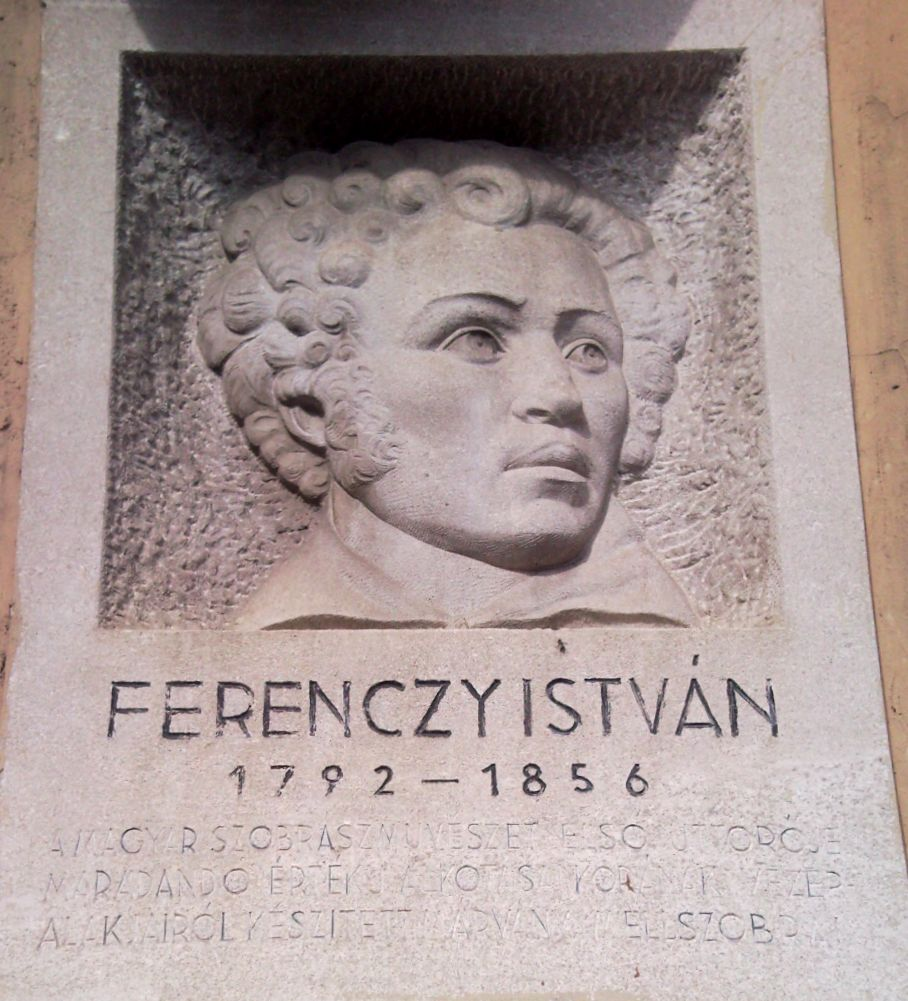
Relief of István Ferenczy on the corner of Magyar utca/ Ferenczy István utca in Budapest, District V

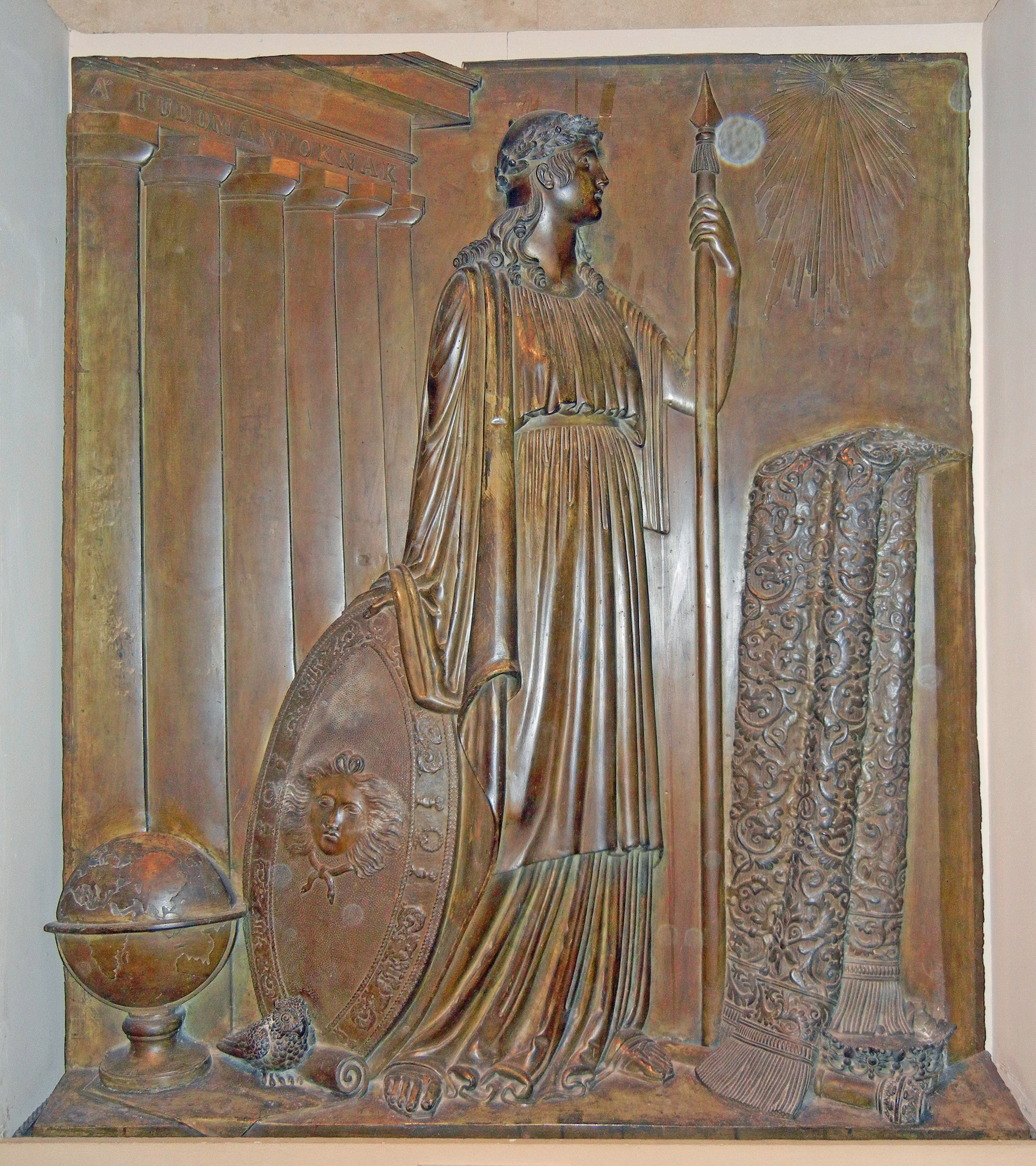
The Allegory of Science by István Ferenczy, Hungarian National Gallery in Buda Castle, 1842–1843

István Ferenczy (February 24, 1792 – July 4, 1856) was a Hungarian sculptor.

== Career ==
Ferenczy made a number of exerted attempts to establish a school of sculpture in Hungary and it was his mission to establish and promote national art in Hungary. However, he proved to be unsuccessful in setting up a sculptural school, but many of his works remain in the Hungarian National Gallery as a symbol of Hungarian art during the first half of the nineteenth century.

Ferenczy died in 1856 in Rimaszombat.

== Some works ==
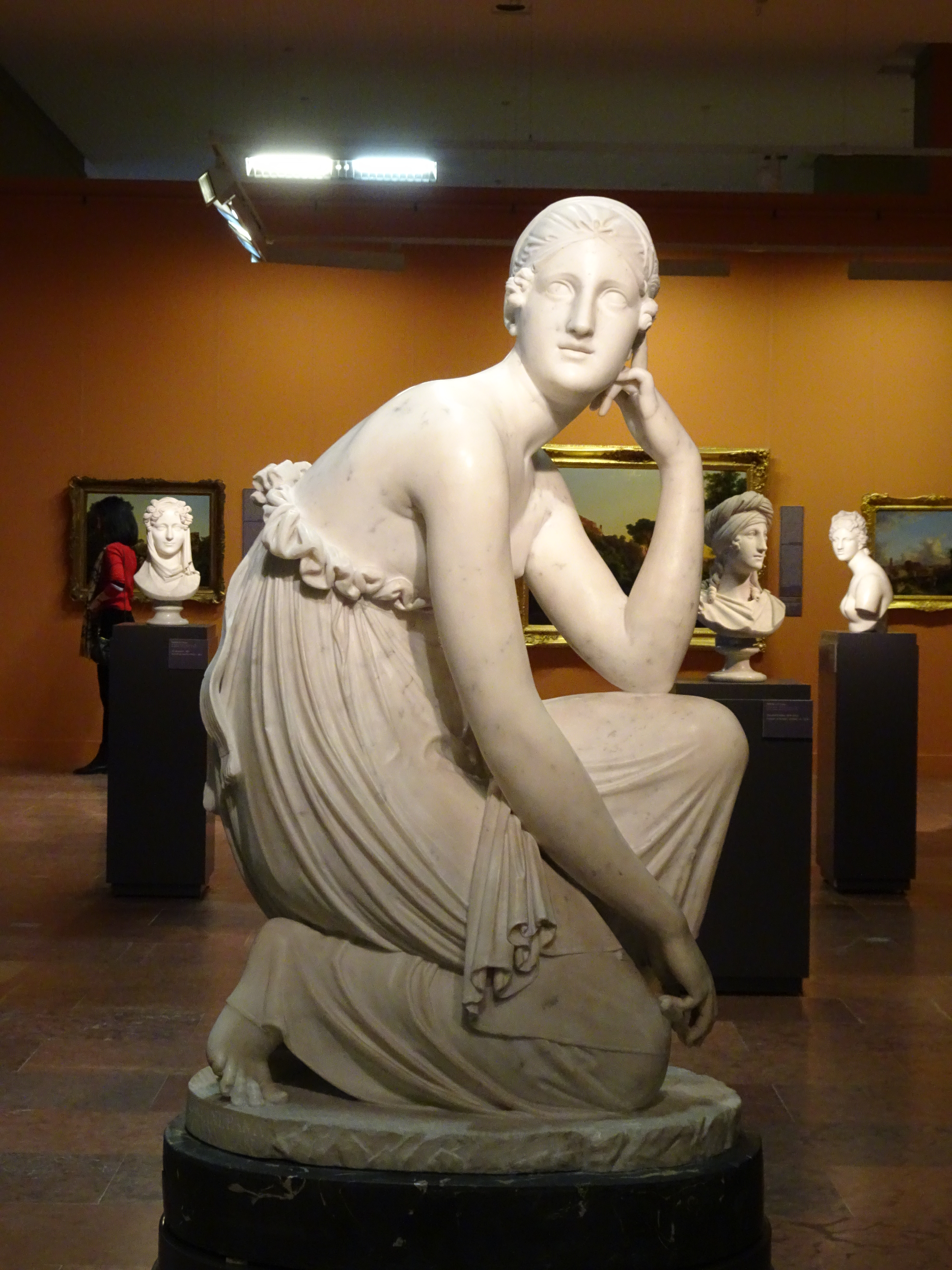
István Ferenczy, The Beginning of Art (Little Shepherdess), 1820–1822

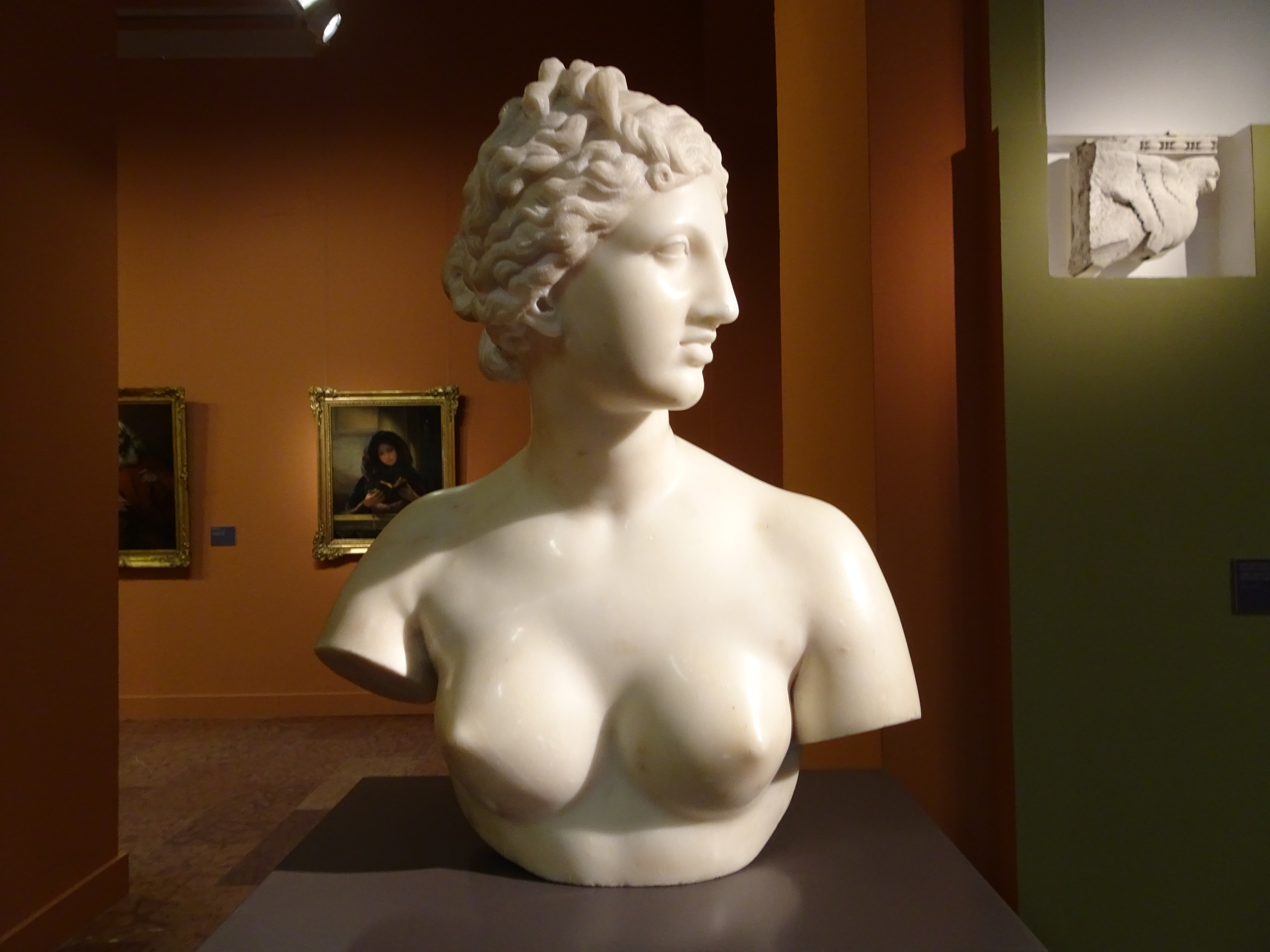
István Ferenczy, Bust of the Medici Venus, after 1822

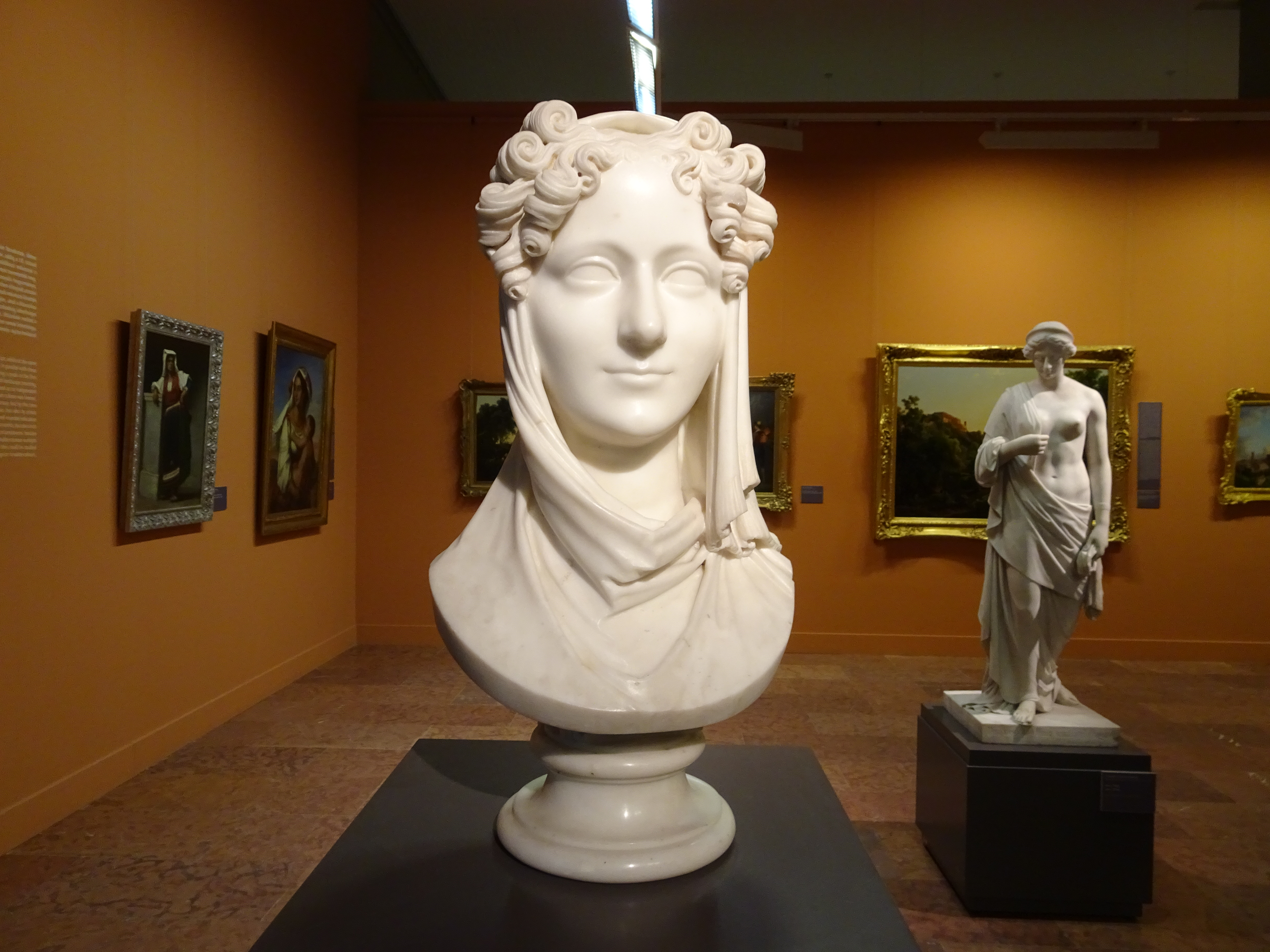
István Ferenczy, Portrait of Countess Viczay, 1824

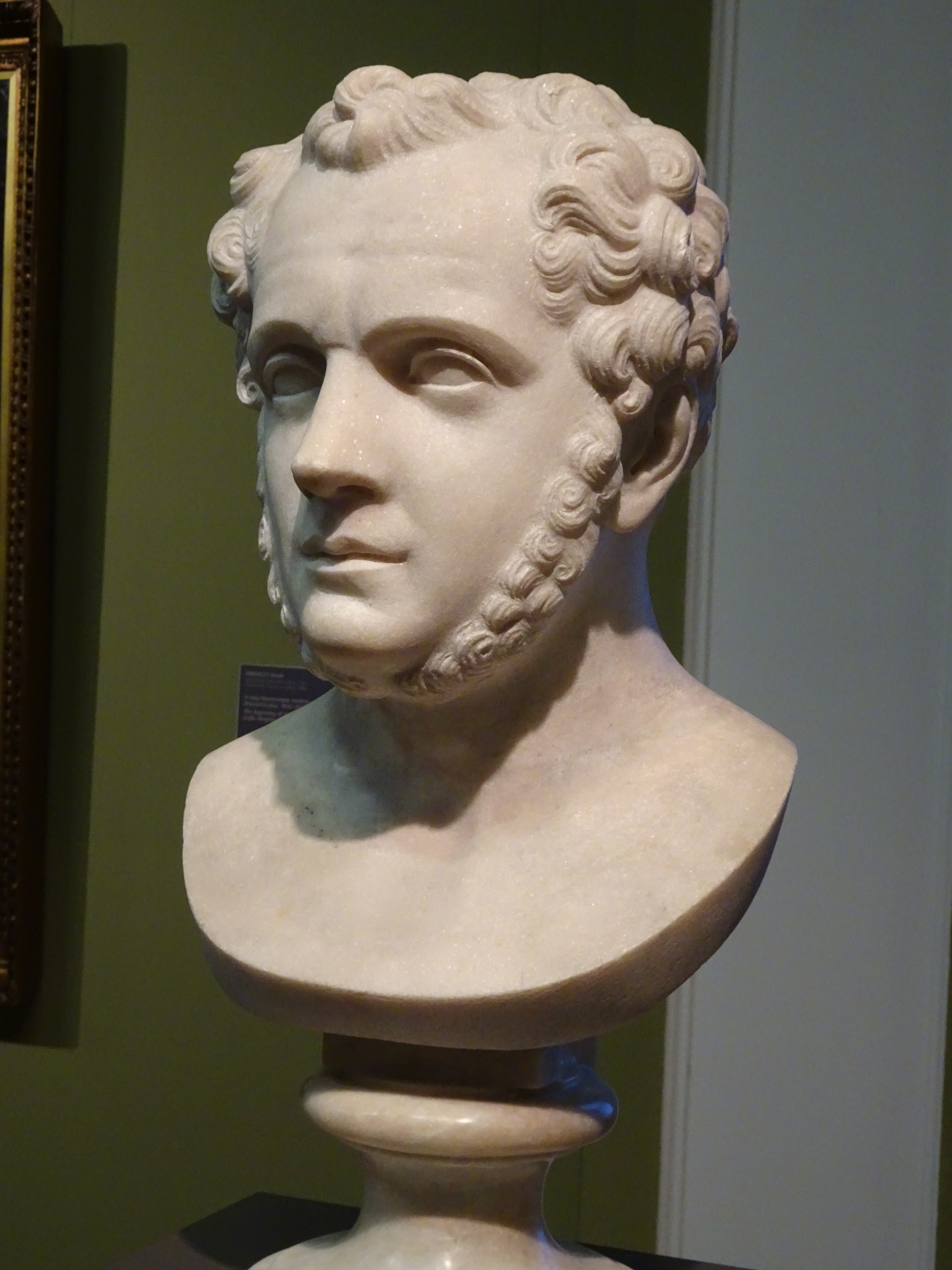
István Ferenczy, Self-portrait, 1830
