= Kálmán Tóth (poet) =

Hungarian poet (1831–1881)

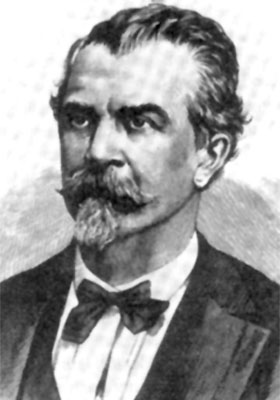
- Kálmán Tóth
- Born: Tóth Kálmán; 1831; Baja, Hungary
- Died: 1881 (aged 49–50)
- Education: Franciscan Gymnasium (now Béla III High School), Baja
- Spouse: Flóra Majthényi (m. 1856; div. 1868)
- Writing career
- Language: Hungarian
- Period: 19th Century
- Genres: Poetry, Drama

Kálmán Tóth (1831–1881) was a Hungarian poet. He was born in Baja. The main theme of his poetry was love.

He studied at the Franciscan Gymnasium (now Béla III High School) in Baja between 1839 and 1845. Tóth was the best student in his class. He was a novice for a short time, but then started to study law. He took part in the Hungarian Revolution of 1848.

After the failure of the revolution, he tried to raise national self-confidence and to cherish the ideals of the revolution. He remembered its heroes in his poetry. He became the sub-editor of Ignác Nagy's Hölgyfutár (English: Ladies' Courier). He was the accountable editor of it between 1856 and 1861.

In 1856, he married Flóra Majthényi, a fellow poet. They divorced in 1868.

In 1860, Tóth launched a political newspaper, Bolond Miska (English: Crazy Michael). From 1864 he was the editor of the Fővárosi Lapok (English: Metropolitan Pages). His writing was regularly published, and his dramas were performed at the Hungarian National Theatre in Budapest.

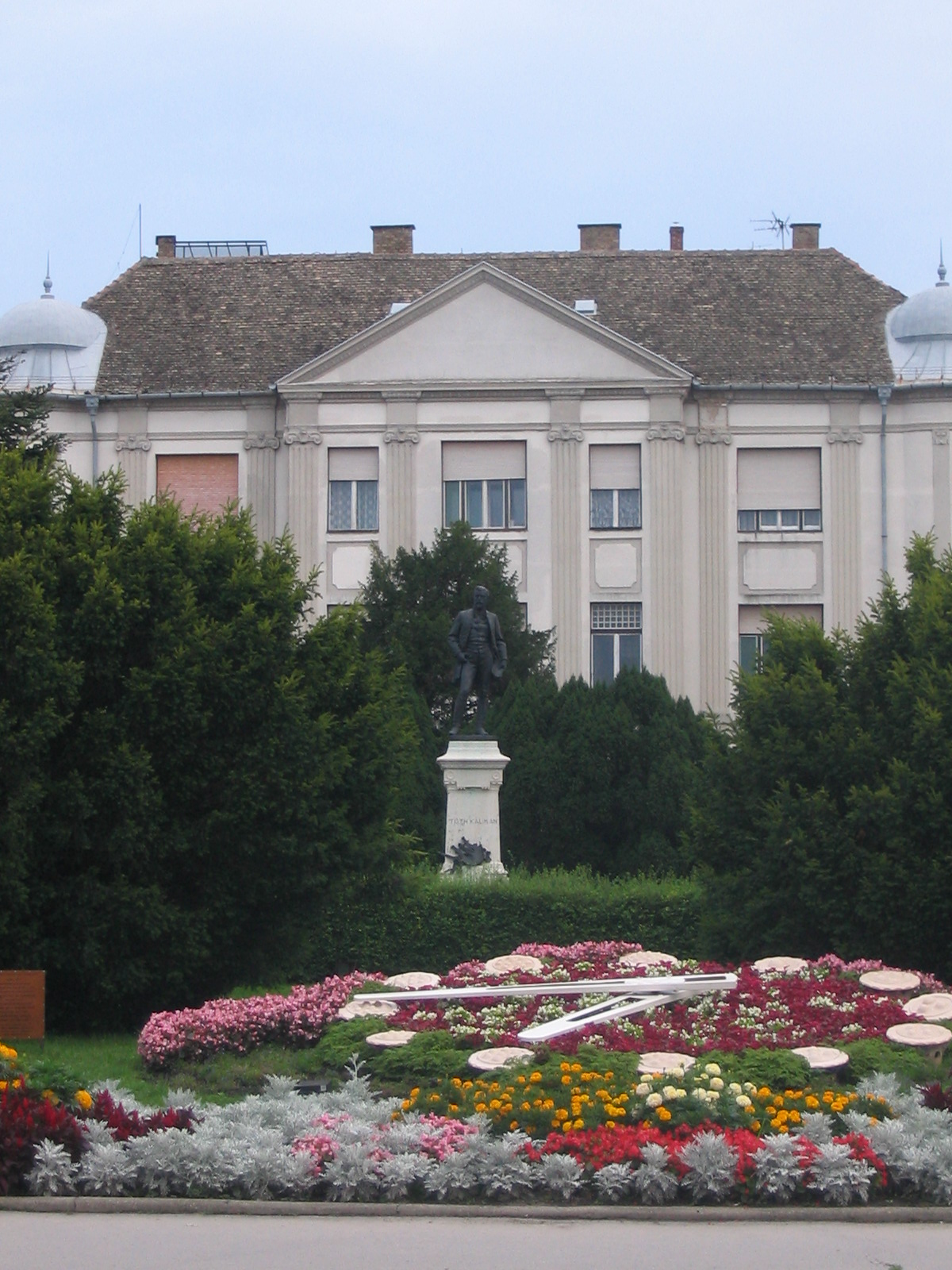
Kálmán Tóth Square, Baja

.

Tóth was elected to be the parliamentary delegate of his home town in 1865. Through four sessions he fought for revolutionary ideas in the Parliament. Tóth took part in raising Baja to be a city with municipal rights, and helped to found Eötvös József College. He also demanded that Baja be connected to the national rail system (now Hungarian State Railways, Hungarian: MÉV).

He lost his seat in the 1878 general election. The frustration of it caused him to lose his mind, and he died at the age of sixty.

The city of Baja has erected a monument in his honour, at Kálmán Tóth Square.
