= Tuzkol =

Tuzkol (Kazakh: Тұзкөл; "salt lake") may refer to:

- Tuzkol, Bayanaul District, a lake in the Pavlodar Region, Kazakhstan
- Tuzkol, Mendykara District, a lake in the Kostanay Region, Kazakhstan
- Tuzkol, Raiymbek District, a lake in the Almaty Region, Kazakhstan

== See also ==
- Tuz (disambiguation)
