= Flóra Majthényi =

Hungarian poet (1837–1915)

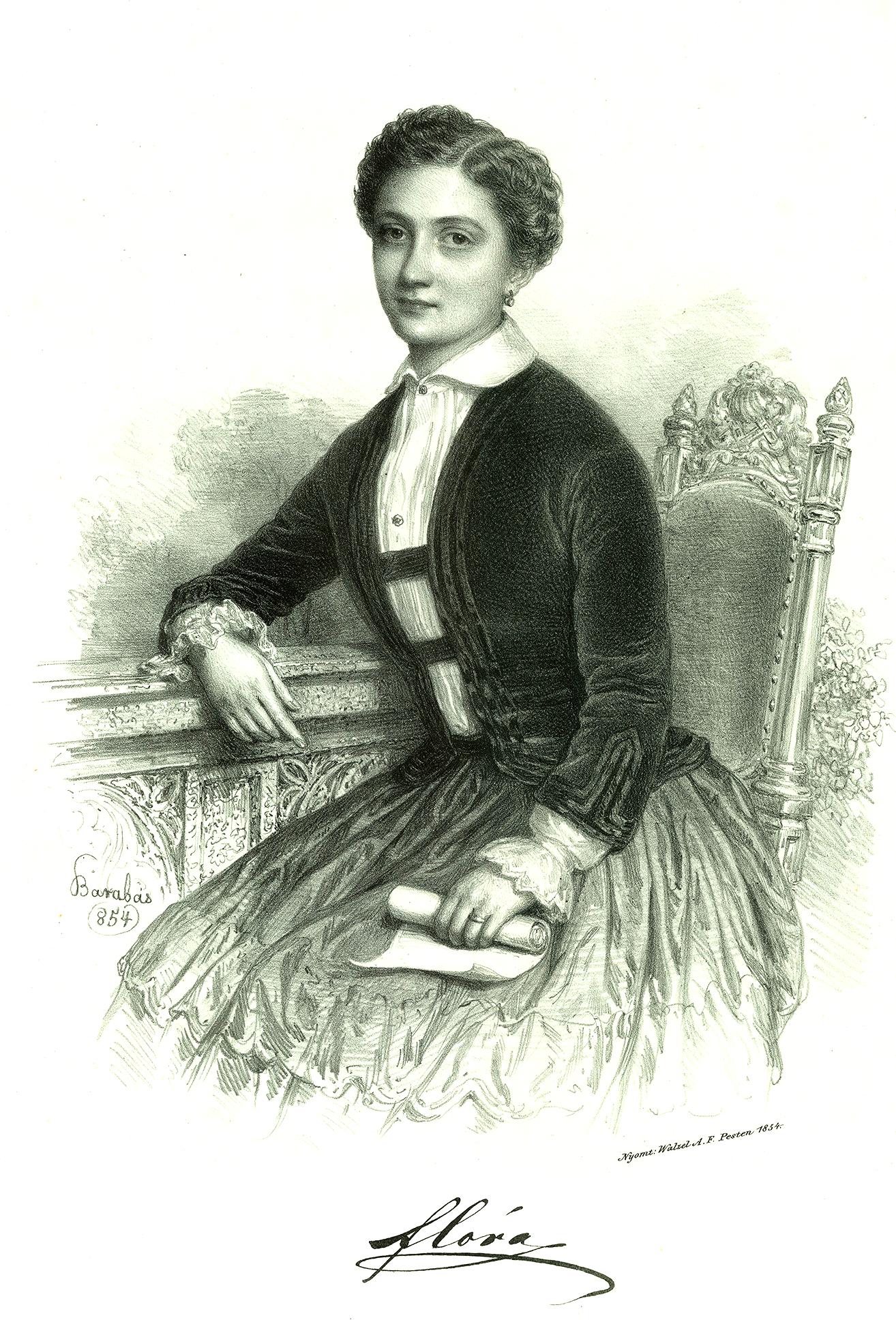
- Miklós Barabás (1854) Flóra Majthényi
- Born: 28 July 1837; Nyitranovák, Kingdom of Hungary, Austrian Empire
- Died: 18 May 1915 (aged 77); Lipótmező, Budapest, Lands of the Crown of Saint Stephen, Austria-Hungary
- Resting place: Farkasréti Cemetery
- Occupations: Poet; writer; dramatist
- Spouse: Kálmán Tóth (m. 1856; div. 1868)
- Children: Béla Tóth

Flóra Majthényi (28 July 1837 – 18 May 1915) was a Hungarian poet, writer and dramatist. Between 1856 and their divorce in 1868, Majthényi was married to fellow poet Kálmán Tóth.

== Life ==
Flóra Majthényi was born into a world of promise and privilege at Nyitranovák (present-day Nováky, Slovakia). Her father, Flórián Majthényi (1784–1844), worked as a district tax collector. Her mother came from an old Hungarian aristocratic family, the Kállays. She was only seven when her father committed suicide. Flora was one of twelve siblings: her youngest brother was born shortly after her father's death, while her eldest brother was already twenty-one at the time. She was taught at home by an English tutor and nurtured artistic ambitions from an early age. Her education included music and foreign languages and she was thought to be talented. Early on she produced simple musical compositions.

Johanna Majthényi, Flóra's mother encouraged her daughter's precocious talent and formed a social network of suitable mentors and potential suitors. Pál Szemere was a regular visitor from 1851 to the family's holiday home while she was growing up and he became an early literary mentor. He was one of several young men competing for her favours at this time. Her first known poems were written when she was twelve, and addressed to Pálhoz Madách, a younger brother of Imre Madách and a distant cousin on her father's side of the family. After he died of pneumonia the recurring theme of her unrequited love for Pálhoz remained with her, appearing in her "Poetry of Pest" in the 1850s. Another friend and mentor was Teréz Ferenczy, at whose funeral in 1853 she sang.

Her first published verses appeared when she was not quite fourteen on 26 May 1851 in Hölgyfutár ("Ladybird" magazine). After that, despite her youth, verses by Flóra Majthényi appeared regularly through the 1850s in papers and magazines such as Hölgyfutár, Családi Lapok and Délibáb: they were published simply under her baptismal name of "Flóra" and proved popular with readers and with customers at Budapest's prestigious Párizsi Nagy Áruház (department store). Later they were grouped together in a single compilation and the resulting volume was published as "Flóra dalai". Sources describe her verses as "light and simple yet popular" ("könnyedek, egyszerűek voltak, mégis népszerűek").

She met Kálmán Tóth, later a successful poet-politician, in 1853. In the face of her mother's opposition they waited till 1856, by which time she was nineteen, before they married. According to at least one source her mother, who faced increasing hardship following her own widowhood, was hoping that Flóra would marry a rich man. The young couple's son, the journalist-philologist Béla Tóth, was born in 1857. A year after that, in 1858, they separated. At the time of their marriage in 1856 observers would have seen Flóra as the rich scion of a privileged family, while Kálmán was a struggling young poet. By the time of their divorce in 1868 Kálmán Tóth was a well established businessman whereas Flóra's work had fallen out of fashion and she was, at least by her former standards, facing destitution. Divorce was very unusual at this time and she was prevented by her former husband from seeing her son while he was growing up after 1868.

On 25 May 1864 "Az uram nem szeret" ("The Lover Does not Love") and "A nők hibája" ("The Women's Failure"), two one-act comedies, published by Majthényi under the pseudonym "Andor Pál", were staged at the National Theatre in Pest. In 1877 she published a new volume of poems, dedicating an entire cycle to Pálhoz Madách, her first love who had died young.

In 1886 Flóra Majthényi moved to Spain: she settled in Seville and then moved to Barcelona. Her book "Adorationes" appeared in Spanish. She also wrote travel books and reports for Hungarian newspapers. She rarely met her son who had become a successful writer back in Hungary and who regularly sent her money. She made at least one lengthy journey to the Holy Land, sending back reports from Jerusalem and from Bethlehem. Later she moved to Algeria which is where she was based in 1907 when news came through that her son had died, a few months short of his fiftieth birthday. In 1908 she moved back to Hungary where she lived in a Budapest apartment. Her health began to fail and she was also diagnosed with mental illness. By the time she died, in 1915, she had become a long-stay patient at the Psychiatric Hospital (Magyar Királyi Országos Tébolydz) in the Lipótmező quarter of Budapest. Majthényi is buried at Farkasréti Cemetery.
