= Teréz Ferenczy =

Hungarian poet (1823–1853)

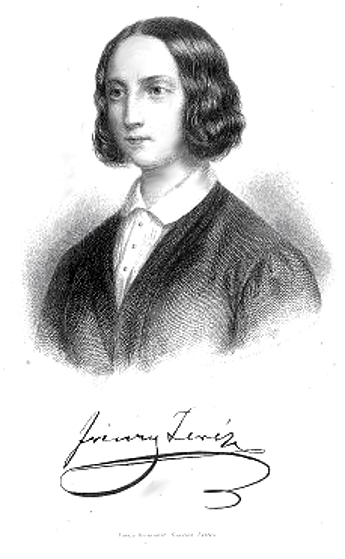
1855

Teréz Ferenczy (17 December 1823 – 22 May 1853) was a Hungarian poet. She came to wider public prominence as a result of her shocking suicide, and most of her poems were published only posthumously. By the final part of the nineteenth century her work had been largely forgotten. It has undergone a revival since the 1970s, however.

== Life ==
Teréz Ferenczy was born in Rimavská Sobota, a mid-sized market town which at that time was in Hungary, which in turn was part of the Austrian Empire. (Today, following frontier changes, Rimavská Sobota is in southern Slovakia.) While she was still very small the family relocated to Szécsény at the edge of the Hungarian plain to the north of Budapest. (Note: Several sources incorrectly identify Szécsény as Teréz Ferenczy's place of birth,) The move seems to have come about in connection with her father's work. Sámuel Ferenczy descended from various prominent and aristocratic families. Teréz Ferenczy's mother, born Teréz Ballay, was the daughter of a minor landlord in the area. The sculptor István Ferenczy (1792–1856) was a cousin. There is no sign of much wealth having passed down to Sámuel Ferenczy: sources indicate that Teréz Ferenczy and her siblings grew up in conditions of some material hardship. The otherwise dilapidated little town of Szécsény was dominated by the baroque manor house of the Forgách family, and it was for the Forgách family estate that Sámuel Ferenczy worked, initially and briefly as a bookbinder, and later as manager of the distillery. In 1846 the Forgáchs succumbed to their growing indebtedness and sold the estate at Szécsény to the politician-writer Ferenc Pulszky. It is not clear what impact this had on Teréz Ferenczy who by now was a young adult, but she would continue to live in Szécsény for the rest of her life.

Because of the family's modest circumstances, Ferenczy's literary development is believed to have been in large measure the result of self-education. Her father's work as a book binder ensured ample access to books. Her mother died while she was still young, leaving Teréz and her three siblings as semi-orphans. She acquired an awareness and then a love of poetry from an early age. As a young woman she spent time in Pest where she met some of the literary celebrities of the day, including the poet Kálmán Lisznyai Damó and Károly Bulcsú, possibly at the home of her kinsman, the sculptor István Ferenczy. Her poems are undated which means that sequencing them chronologically presents a challenge. They deal with the trials and storms of love, and are tempered with an underlying strand of melancholy which appears to have intensified over time. Her first piece of published prose writing appeared in the Pest fashion magazine "Esküszegő" and was a semi-autobiographical piece concerning a love tragedy ("...saját szerelmi tragédiáját").

Lajos Ferenczy, a trainee priest, seems to have been the sibling to whom Teréz was closest. One source describes him as "her confidant, comforter and support in her disappointments and loneliness" ("...a bizalmasa, csalódásaiban, magányosságában vigasztalója, segítője"). Lajos, however, took up arms in the freedom struggle (Note: English language sources refer to the Hungarian uprisings of 1848/49 as the Hungarian Revolution of 1848, "Hungarian Revolution" or "Hungarian "War of Independence") and was killed on 20 June 1849. His memory is preserved in his sister's poem "Ó ne kérdjétek" (loosely, "Do not ask"). The loss exacerbated Teréz Ferenczy's tendency to melancholy. It was only in 1853, which would be the year of her death, that her poems began to appear in newspapers and journals. At least one source notes that suicide already ran in the Ferenczy family, and on 22 May 1853 driven, it is reported, by disappointment in love and continuing grieving over her brother's death, Teréz Ferenczy shot herself in the heart. As the pathologist's report points out without sentiment, she narrowly avoided the main chambers of her heart, but nevertheless succeeded in killing herself. Reports of her death led to a surge of interest in her poetry, with the first of several collections published in 1854.

== Published collections / anthologies (selection) ==
- Téli csillagok; Ferenczy Teréz hagyományaiból összeszedte Bulcsú Károly; Müller Gyula, Pest 1854
- Ferenczy Teréz minden versei; Nógrád Megyei Múzeumok Igazgatósága, Salgótarján, 1983 (Nógrádi irodalmi ritkaságok)
- Téli csillagok. Ferenczy Teréz hagyományaiból. Hasonmás; összeszedte Búlcsú Károly, bev. Galcsik Zsolt; Múzeumbaráti Kör, Szécsény, 1993 (Szécsényi honismereti kiskönyvtár)
