= Eduard Kabos =

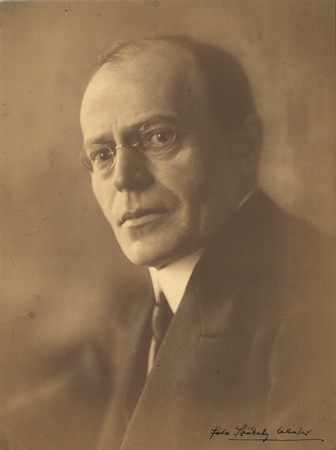
- Eduard Kabos (1910)
- Born: 2 December 1864; Nagykároly, Kingdom of Hungary (now Carei, Romania)
- Died: 8 August 1923 (aged 58); Abbazia, Kingdom of Italy (now Opatija, Croatia)
- Occupations: Journalist, dramatist, and writer

Eduard Kabos (2 December 1864 – 8 August 1923) was a Hungarian journalist, dramatist, and writer.

== Career ==
He entered the University of Budapest for the purpose of studying modern philology, intending to become a teacher, but adopted journalism instead. He at first accepted a position with the newspaper Egyetértés, but his abilities soon secured for him the position of parliamentary reporter and writer of feuilletons for Pesti Napló. In 1897, he became a contributor to Országos Hirlap, and in 1898 editor of the parliamentary column of Budapesti Napló. In 1902, he was elected a member of the most prominent Hungarian literary society, Petöfi Társaság, in recognition of the services he rendered to Hungarian literature.

Kabos' works include Elzüllöttek (1885), stories; Vásáo (1887), a novel; A Kupéhau (1888), a farce; Evo (1889), a drama; Harakiri (1889), stories; Tantalusz (1891), a drama; Koldusok (1893), stories; Fehév Eprakák (1893), a novel; A Holló (1895), a comedy; Mab Királyno (1895), a comedy; Por (1895), stories; Vándorok (1897), stories; A Cseugeri Kalapok (1898), stories; A Verebek (1900), a novel.

Kabos died in 1923.

== See also ==
- List of Hungarian writers
