= Virt =

- Municipality
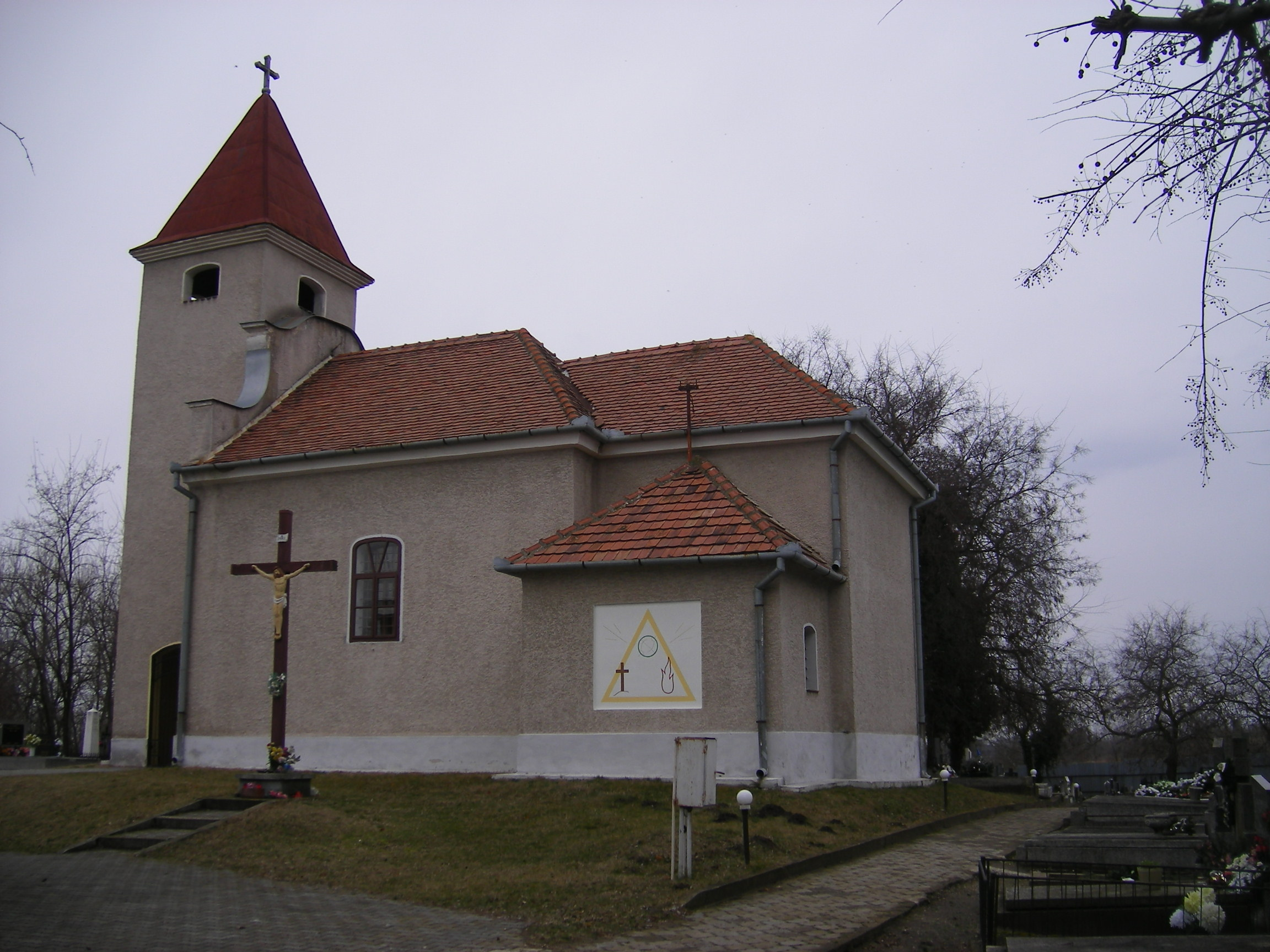
- Catholic church

- Flag Coat of arms

- Location of Virt in the Nitra Region Location of Virt in Slovakia
- Coordinates: 47.75°N 18.32°E
- Country: Slovakia
- Region: Nitra Region
- District: Komárno District
- First mentioned: 1256

Area
  - Total: 4.69 km^{2} (1.81 sq mi)
- Elevation: 114 m (374 ft)

Population (2025)
  - Total: 324
- Time zone: UTC+1 (CET)
  - Summer (DST): UTC+2 (CEST)
- Postal code: 946 38
- Area code: +421 35
- Vehicle registration plate (until 2022): KN
- Website: www.obecvirt.sk

Virt (Hungarian: Virt) is a municipality at the Danube in the Komárno District in Slovakia in the Nitra Region.

== Geography ==
The municipality lies at an altitude of 114 metres (374 ft) and covers an area of 4.69 km^{2} (1.81 sq mi) (2025).

== History ==
The village is known for findings of richly endowed Avar graves from the 7th and 8th century AD.In the 9th century, the territory of Vrbová nad Váhom became part of the Kingdom of Hungary. The first written mention of the village dates back to 1256. After the Austro-Hungarian army disintegrated in November 1918, Czechoslovak troops occupied the area, later acknowledged internationally by the Treaty of Trianon. Between 1938 and 1945 territory of Vrbová nad Váhom once more became part of Miklós Horthy's Hungary through the First Vienna Award. From 1945 until the Velvet Divorce, it was part of Czechoslovakia. Since then it has been part of Slovakia. Before 1990 it was part of Radvaň nad Dunajom.

== Population ==
Population statistic (10 years)
Year	1995	2005	2015	2025
Count	326	318	273	324
Difference		−2.45%	−14.15%	+18.68%

Population statistic
Year	2024	2025
Count	324	324
Difference		+0%

It has a population of 324 people (31 December 2025).

=== Ethnicity ===
Census 2021 (1+ %)
Ethnicity	Number	Fraction
Hungarian	208	67.31%
Slovak	106	34.3%
Total	309	

In year 2021 was 309 people by ethnicity 208 as Hungarian, 106 as Slovak, 3 as Not found out, 3 as Other, 2 as Czech, 2 as Bulgarian and 1 as Italian.

Note on population: The difference values of population numbers in the table "Population statistic" and in the sections "Ethnicity" & "Religion" is caused by the use of various statistical methods.

=== Religion ===
Census 2021 (1+ %)
Religion	Number	Fraction
Roman Catholic Church	152	49.19%
None	93	30.1%
Calvinist Church	41	13.27%
Jehovah's Witnesses	10	3.24%
Evangelical Church	6	1.94%
Total	309	

In year 2021 was 309 people by religion 152 from Roman Catholic Church, 93 from None, 41 from Calvinist Church, 10 from Jehovah's Witnesses, 6 from Evangelical Church, 2 from Islam, 2 from Other, 2 from Greek Catholic Church and 1 from Not found out.
