= Andor Gellért =

Hungarian journalist

- Born: 20 December 1907; Alba Iulia
- Died: 28 November 1990 (aged 82)
- Occupations: Journalist, radio editor

Andor Gellért (Hungarian: Gellért Andor, Hungarian pronunciation: [ɡeleːrt]) was a Hungarian journalist born in Gyulafehérvár, on 20 December 1907, and died in Budapest on 28 November 1990.

== Career ==
Andor Gellért finished his studies in the Economics faculty at the technical universities of Budapest, Paris and Berlin. He took part in the student movements of the 1920s and 30s. Between 1930 and 1938, Gellért worked with Pál Teleki at the Institute of Political Science. In 1939, he became a journalist, becoming Hungarian Telegraphic Office's Berlin correspondent. In 1942, he helped fabricate an armistice with Sweden, working with the American Office of Strategic Services. After the end of World War II, Gellért moved to the US. From then until 1954, he worked in the New York City editorial office of Radio Free Europe, and between 1954 and 1957 he was head of the Hungarian Desk. He then worked as a radio editor until his retirement.
