= Ida Urr =

Slovak Hungarian poet and doctor

- Born: 25 November 1904; Kassa, Kingdom of Hungary, Austria-Hungary (now Košice, Slovakia)
- Died: 2 August 1989 (aged 84); Budapest, Hungary
- Education: Eötvös Loránd University
- Occupations: Poet, Doctor
- Writing career
- Language: Hungarian

Ida Urr (25 November 1904, Košice - 2 August 1989, Budapest) was a Hungarian medical doctor and poet.

== Life ==
Urr graduated in Medicine from the Eötvös Loránd University in 1929 among the first female doctors in Hungary. As a Swedish Red Cross doctor in World War II Budapest she saved many Jews from prosecution and murder by the Arrow Cross Party militias. She also hid Jews in her own home at a great risk to herself. Her sacrifices and good works were recognized by Yad Vashem, that included Ida Urr among the Righteous Among the Nations shortly before her death.

== Poetry ==
Urr began writing poetry already in her youth, while living in Košice before moving to Budapest for her studies. She published in Hungarian-language literary magazines in Czechoslovakia and held her first public poetry reading in Prešov in 1926. After moving to Hungary, she kept on publishing poetry reflecting social topics, including the brutality of fascism.
