= MT Frankopan =

History

Croatia
- Name: M/T Frankopan
- Operator: Tankerska Plovidba d.d.
- Builder: Split, Croatia
- Launched: 1995
- Identification: IMO number: 9796731; MMSI number: 238020000; Callsign: 9A3552
- Status: in active service

General characteristics
- Type: Aframax crude oil tanker
- Tonnage: 63,802 GT 114,305 DWT
- Length: 244.3 m (801 ft 6 in) o/a
- Beam: 39.4 m (129 ft 3 in)
- Draught: 14.65 m (48 ft 1 in)
- Propulsion: MAN B&W 6L 60 MC(MCR) engines, 10,440 kW (14,000 hp)
- Speed: 13.5 knots (25.0 km/h; 15.5 mph)
- Capacity: 108,636 m³ (At 98%, inc. slops)

MT Frankopan is one of several crude oil tankers in the fleet of Tankerska Plovidba, a shipping company based in Zadar, Croatia. It is named after Fran Krsto Frankopan, a Croatian nobleman of the Frankopan family, a noted poet and politician in the 17th century. It currently operates in the Mediterranean sea.
