= Gyula Hornyánszky =

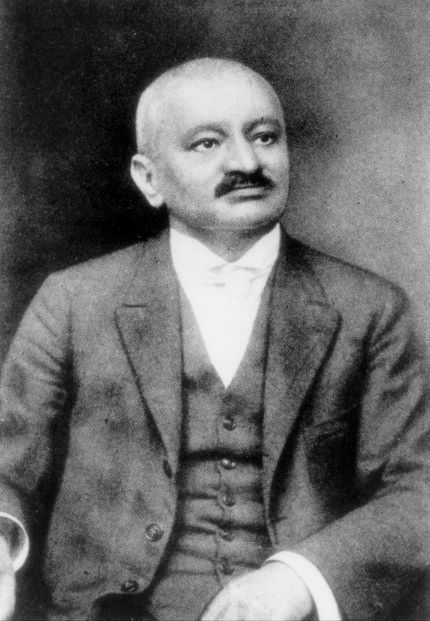
Hornyánszky Gyula, c. 1920.

Gyula Hornyánszky (Pest, 22 September 1869 - Budapest, 31 January 1933), was a Hungarian classical scholar and member of the Hungarian Academy of Sciences.

== Selected publications ==
- Pindaros. Tanulmány. Budapest, 1891.
- Temetési versenyküzdelmek az ősgörögöknél. Budapest, Hornyánszky Viktor, 1900.
- Történetírás és philosophia. Budapest, Hornyánszky Viktor, 1904.
- A homerosi beszédek tömeglélektani vonatkozásukban. Budapest, A.M. Tud. Akad., 1915.
- Die Idee der öffentlichen Meinung bei den Griechen. Szeged, 1922.
