= Jean-Pierre Montcassen =

- Cselenyák Imre
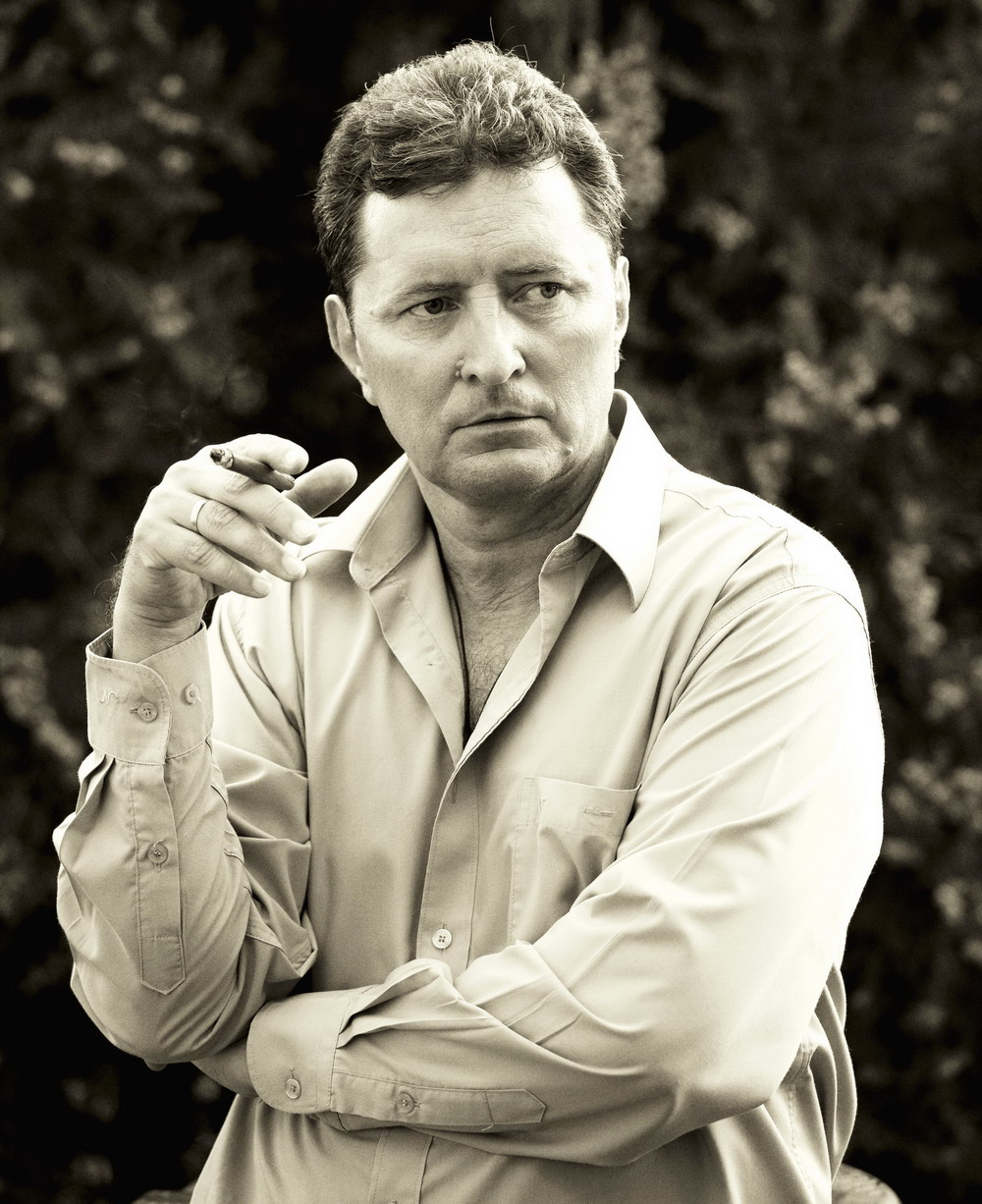
- Montcassen in 2011
- Born: 1 January 1957 (age 69); Hungary
- Citizenship: Hungarian
- Occupations: story teller, short story writer, novelist, musician, song lyricist
- Spouse: Rita Cservenka
- Children: Balázs & Tibor
- Awards: Rauscher Prize of the Town of Dorog, Hungary

Jean-Pierre Montcassen is a pen name of Imre Cselenyák (Nyírkáta, Hungary, 1 January 1957.) a story teller (in his own words), novelist, musician, song lyricist, the vice president of the Hungarian Prose Writer Workshop, and a member of the Hungarian Literary Authors' Collecting Society (HLACS) ("MISZJE").

== His activities ==
After he graduated from high school, he worked as a workman, mainly in the pharmaceutical industry. He educated himself musically, he completed a performers' licence exam at the state office ORI in the 80's, he was a member of the ensembles Vulkán, Hipnózis, Kontinens as composer-songwriter-singer. He is a member for life of the band Írottkő Műhely ("Written Stone Workshop"). He has achieved his biggest successes with the ensemble Kontinens. Radio and television recording were made with him, he performed in many legendary places: Metró klub ("Metro Club"), Budai Ifjúsági Park ("Youth Park of Buda"), Petőfi csarnok ("Petőfi Hall"), etc.

In 1989, he finished a course in journalism, since then he has been writing short stories, novels. His short prose has been published in Hungarian by literary journals C. E. T., Polisz, Új Holnap, Magyar Napló, Debreceni Disputa. His writings can also be read in the columns of the dailies 24 ÓRA, Kelet Magyarország, and others, as well as the magazines Gyöngy, and Anna. He is a member of the Writers' Association. In Budapest, in Dorog, throughout the country, as well as over the border (Upper Hungary, Transylvania), he has been organizing literary evenings, has been participating in writer-reader meetings. In the Club of the Writers' Association, along with writer Ferenc Gáspár, he has introduced authors and editors as part of the programs of the Prózaműhely ("Prose Workshop"). He lives in Dorog, his wife is Rita Cservenka, journalist, cultural organizer, his grown-up sons are Balázs (1989), and Tibor (1990).

== His novels under the name Jean-Pierre Montcassen ==
(English work titles are given in parentheses.)

- A halál vámszedője (2000, Puedlo ISBN 963-9320-54-4)

("The Publican of Death")

- Tajgerosz kegyeltje (2001, Puedlo ISBN 963-9320-90-0)

("Taigeros' Favorite ")

- A legionárius (2002, Puedlo ISBN 963-9477-53-2)

("The Legionary")

- Azálea (2003, Puedlo ISBN 963-9477-26-5)

("Azalea")

- A fáraó lánya (2004, Puedlo ISBN 963-9477-70-2)

("The Pharaoh's Daughter")

- Az egyiptomi kéjnő (2006, Puedlo ISBN 963 9673 153)

("The Egyptian Harlot")

- A magyarok nyilaitól... (2008, Puedlo ISBN 978-963-249-042-7)

("From the Arrows of Hungarians...")

- Attila, Isten ostora (2008, Puedlo ISBN 978-963-249-043-4)

("Attila, the Scourge of God")

- A sivatag hercegnője (2009, Puedlo ISBN 978-963-249-095-3)

("The Princess of the Desert")

- Az egyiptomi kéjnő (2009, Puedlo, second edition ISBN 978-963-249-094-6)

("The Egyptian Harlot")

- A fáraó lánya (2010, Puedlo, second edition ISBN 978-963-9477-78-0)

("The Pharaoh's Daughter")

- A sivatag hercegnője (2010, Puedlo, second edition ISBN 978-963-249-105-9)

("The Princess of the Desert")

- Az egyiptomi kéjnő (2010, Puedlo, third edition ISBN 978-963-249-104-2)

("The Egyptian Harlot")

- Szamuráj és gésa (2010, Puedlo, ISBN 978-963-249-108-0)

("Samurai and Geisha")

- A legionárius szerelme (2011, Zen, ISBN 978-615-517-113-0)

("The Legionary's Love" – same as The Legionary, with revised title )
