= Béla III Gymnasium =

School in Baja, Hungary

Coordinates: 46.1799°N 18.9519°E

Béla III High School
- Hungarian: III. Béla Gimnázium
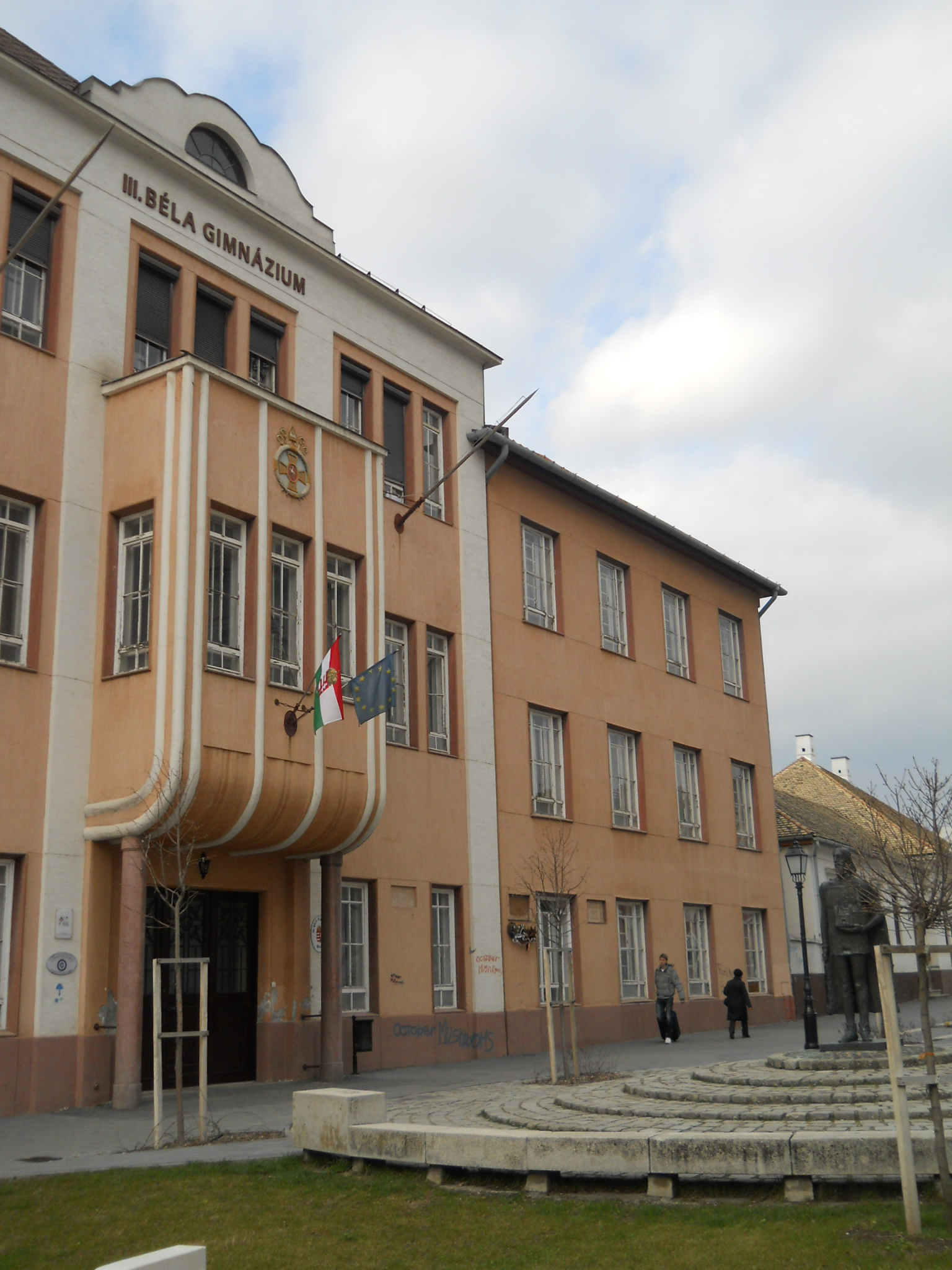
- Baja; Hungary

Information
- Type: Gymnasium
- Established: 1757; 269 years ago
- Teaching staff: c. 50
- Age: 12 to 18
- Enrollment: c. 700
- Website: http://www.bajabela.edu.hu/

The Béla III Gymnasium (Hungarian: III. Béla Gimnázium) is a secondary school in Baja, Hungary. It was founded in 1757.

== Overview ==
The school has more than 50 teachers, teaching 4-year and 6-year courses for students between the ages of 12 and 18. There are around 700 students in 22 study groups (classes).

All of the school's first course pupils participate in a one-week course related to studying. The school teaches foreign languages such as English, German, French, Italian, Russian and Latin.

Most of the study groups and classes are specialized in mathematics, foreign languages, or communication-drama-media studies. Students can participate in clubs and study groups preparing for study contests, language exams and universities.

More than 90% of the students successfully get into a University or College. The institute is in 19th place among more than 400 Hungarian high schools.

The school teaches computer science and provides Internet access to all students. They also use multimedia equipment in their teaching process. The school uses its school website as an online database for teachers, students and parents, it's also used to contact former students.

The school participates in online national and international educational programs, some of which include iEARN, myEurope, eSchola.

Bela III was one of the five "Recommended Schools" in Childnet Awards 2000. The school's staff plans to start "Blue Danube", an international project for schools located on the river Danube.

The school has a student senate. Children can participate in the musical and drama studio, choir or visual art studio, write the school newspaper 3-4 times a year and organize sports activities and traditional school events during the school year. It is one of the first schools in Hungary to use the Comenius 2000 educational quality assurance process.

== See also ==
- Baja, Hungary
