= Noémi Szécsi =

Hungarian writer and translator (born 1976)

Noémi Szécsi (born 1976) is a Hungarian writer and translator. She was educated in Budapest and Helsinki. Her debut novel The Finno-Ugrian Vampire was published in 2002, and later translated into English. Her historical novel Communist Monte Cristo (2006) won the EU Prize for Literature.
