= Flora Frangepán =

Flora Frangepán (fl. 1743), was a Hungarian writer.

She was a member of the order of Saint Clare in Bratislava. Between 1722 and 1743, she made several translations which were also published.

== Sources ==
- Danielik József: Magyar írók. Életrajz-gyűjtemény. Második, az elsőt kiegészítő kötet. Pest, Szent István Társulat, 1858.
