= Tamás Tűz =

Hungarian poet, writer, and Catholic priest

Tamás Tűz (Hungarian pronunciation: [ˈtɒmaːʃ ˈtyːz]; 18 April 1916 – 7 April 1992) was a Hungarian poet, writer, and Catholic priest.

He spent time in a Soviet concentration camp during the Second World War. After the Hungarian Revolution of 1956, he went to Canada.

22 volumes, one of which is in English: On Restless Wings (1966). English translations of his poems were also published in the anthology The Sound of Time (Lethbridge, 1974).
