= Kati Rekai =

Canadian writer (1921–2010)

- Born: October 20, 1921; Budapest, Hungary
- Died: February 1, 2010 (aged 88); Toronto, Ontario, Canada
- Occupation: Author
- Genre: Children's literature
- Spouse: John Rekai

Catherine (Kati) Rekai, CM (October 20, 1921 – February 1, 2010) was a Hungarian-Canadian writer and broadcaster, author of a series of twenty travel books for children, The Adventures of Mickey, Taggy, Puppo, and Cica: How They Discover..., published in English, French, Polish, Romanian, Hungarian, Chinese and Braille.

The Toronto Star has referred to Rekai as "a one-woman band for CanLit" and The Globe and Mail called her "Toronto's first lady of multiculturalism".

== Biography ==
She was born on October 20, 1921, in Budapest, Hungary, to Desider and Ilona (Helen) Elek née Hajdu. She married John Rekai, a doctor, at 18 years old; the couple later fled Communist Hungary in 1948 with little money and moved to Paris. In 1950, they moved to Canada with their two children, Judyth and Julie. The family settled in Toronto, starting Central Hospital together with her brother-in-law. The hospital's aim was to serve those of different cultural backgrounds. Rekai was the hospital's public relations officer.

Years later, Julie, while pregnant with the family's first grandson, Christopher, suggested her mother write a children's book; this led Rekai to begin the Adventures of Mickey, Taggy, Puppo, and Cica series. The characters were modeled after the family's pets as well as the neighbors' cat. Other characters represented various ethnic backgrounds. Rekai continued to write a book for her grandson's birthday each year.

She died on February 1, 2010, in Toronto, Ontario, Canada.

== Selected works ==
Rekai's books include the series The Adventures of Mickey, Taggy, Puppo, and Cica and How They Discover..., consisting of 20 books and published by Canadian Stage and Arts Publications:

- Toronto
- The Gardiner Museum of Ceramic Art
- Ottawa
- Montreal
- Kingston
- Brockville and the Thousand Islands
- British Columbia
- Budapest
- Vienna
- The Netherlands
- France
- Italy
- Switzerland
- Greece

In addition, she wrote a book celebrating Toronto's bicentennial, Mickey, Taggy, Puppo and Cica Celebrate Toronto 200. 300,000 copies of her books have been sold.

The stories have been adapted into several puppet shows: The Great Totem Pole Caper, Peter and the Time Marchine, The Tale of Tutenkhamen, and The Boy Who Forgot, the last of which also has a video version.

== Organization ==
Organizations with which Rekai was associated were:

- Canadian Society of Children's Authors, Illustrators and Performers (CANSCAIP)
- Canadian Opera Company
- George R. Gardiner Museum of Ceramic Art
- Canada–Hungary Educational Foundation
- Friends of Toronto Public Libraries

== Positions ==
Rekai was also the weekly cultural commentator for The Hungarian Show on the Toronto-based broadcasting station CIAO Radio530AM, and a columnist for Kaleidoscope Magazine. Some of the other positions that Rekai held as a contributor to the literary arts include:

- Arts commentator, CHIN Radio
- Contributor/director, Performing Arts & Entertainment Magazine
- Literary Workshops in Schools
- Chair, Foreign Affairs Committee, The Writers' Union of Canada
- Vice-president, Canadian Ethnic Media Association
- Director, Toronto International Exchange Foundation
- Director, Canadian Scene Multi-language News Service
- Director, Hungarian-Canadian Chamber of Commerce
- Director, CREES, University of Toronto
- Director, Toronto Operetta Theatre
- Cultural columnist, Kanadai/Amerikai Magyarsag

== Writers' Union of Canada ==
Rekai was granted life membership in the Writers' Union of Canada "in recognition of her exceptional contributions to the advancement of the works of Canadian writers on the world stage".

As chair of its Foreign Affairs Committee, she developed and organized 20 Canadian Book Exhibitions Abroad for the Writers' Union of Canada in Budapest, Hungary; Galatz, Romania; Prague, Czechoslovakia; Berlin, East Germany; Riga, Latvia; Tokyo, Japan; Athens, Greece; New York City; Belfast, Northern Ireland; Ljubljana, Slovenia; Kiev, Ukraine; Lanzhou, People's Republic of China; Sofia, Bulgaria; Tirana, Albania; Havana, Cuba; Manila, the Philippines; St. Petersburg, Russia; Cape Town, South Africa; and Colombo, Sri Lanka.

== Awards and legacy ==
Rekai received a number of awards in recognition of her achievements including:

- Prix Saint-Exupery, Francophonie Valeurs-Jeunesse (Paris)
- Knighthood of St. Ladislaus
- Certificate of Honour for Contribution to Canadian Unity
- Rakoczi Foundation Award for the Preservation of the Historical and Cultural Heritage of the Magyars
- Cross of the Order of Merit of the Republic of Hungary for Contribution to the Development of Canadian–Hungarian Cultural Relations
- Sierhey Khamara Ziniak Award for Excellence in Journalism

She was appointed to the Order of Canada in 1993 with the following citation: "Has written travel books for children that introduce and promote Canadian cities and European countries through the eyes of four animals, Mickey, Taggy, Puppo and Cica, each of which represents a part of the Canadian mosaic; the books educate children and adults about music, literature, pioneering and native peoples".

The Rekai Family Parkette in Toronto is named after the Rekai family.
