= Annamária Kinde =

Romanian journalist, poet and editor

- Born: Annamária Kinde; 10 June 1956; Oradea, Romania
- Died: 5 January 2014 (aged 57)
- Occupations: Journalist, poet, editor
- Years active: 1990–2014
- Children: Anna (b. 1990)

Annamária Kinde (10 June 1956 – 5 January 2014) was a Romanian journalist, poet and editor.

Annamária Kinde was an ethnic Hungarian and died on 5 January 2014, aged 57.
