= Rimavská Sobota =

Rimavská Sobota Rimaszombat
- Municipality
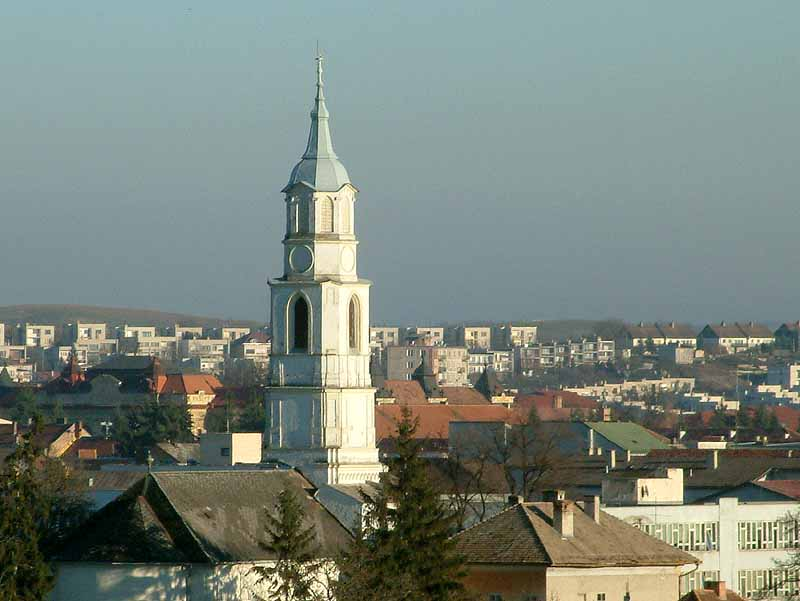
- Panorama of Rimavská Sobota

- Flag Coat of arms

- Location of Rimavská Sobota in the Banská Bystrica Region Location of Rimavská Sobota in Slovakia
- Coordinates: 48.38°N 20.01°E
- Country: Slovakia
- Region: Banská Bystrica Region
- District: Rimavská Sobota District
- First mentioned: 1268

Government
  - Mayor: Jozef Šimko

Area
  - Total: 77.55 km^{2} (29.94 sq mi)
- Elevation: 241 m (791 ft)

Population (2025)
  - Total: 20,964
- Time zone: UTC+1 (CET)
  - Summer (DST): UTC+2 (CEST)
- Postal code: 979 01
- Area code: +421 47
- Vehicle registration plate (until 2022): RS
- Website: www.rimavskasobota.sk

Rimavská Sobota (Slovak pronunciation: [ˈrimawskaː ˈsɔbɔta]; Hungarian: Rimaszombat, German: Großsteffelsdorf) is a town in southern Slovakia, in the Banská Bystrica Region, on the Rimava river. It has approximately 24,000 inhabitants. The town is a historical capital of Gömör és Kishont County (from 1850 to 1922).

== Geography ==
The municipality lies at an altitude of 241 metres (791 ft) and covers an area of 77.55 km^{2} (29.94 sq mi) (2025).

It is located around 280 kilometres (174 miles) east of the national capital Bratislava, around 110 km (68 mi) southeast of Banská Bystrica and 130 kilometres (81 miles) west of Košice. The town, along with the district lies in the Rimava river valley in the Slovenské rudohorie mountains, in the Southern Slovak Basin. There are two protected areas close to the town in the district, Cerová vrchovina to the south and Muránska planina National Park to the north.

The town is composed of 11 parts/boroughs: Bakta, Dúžava, Kurinec, Mojín, Nižná Pokoradz, Rimavská Sobota, Sabová, Sobôtka, Včelinec, Vinice and Vyšná Pokoradz.

== History ==
The first traces of settlement in the town's territory come from the Neolithic. Other archaeological discoveries are dated to the middle and late Bronze Age and Iron Age. Several tribes have passed through the area, including Celts, Germanic tribes and several others during the Migration Period. The Slavs settled here most likely in the 7th and 8th centuries. The old Hungarian tribes came at the beginning of the 10th century and settled in the 11th century. A medieval town was probably founded in the second half of the 11th century and became a market town.

The first written record about Rimavská Sobota was in 1268 as Rymoa Zumbota and belonged to the Archbishop of Kalocsa, who owned the land from 1150 to around 1340. In 1334 the ownership changed to Thomas Szécsényi from Transylvania. The town received a privilege charted in 1335 on the basis of the Buda municipal law. In the first half of the 15th century, it was a small town, and economic development had begun, when the first guilds were established. However, it was interrupted by Turkish occupation, first in 1553–1593 and then in 1596–1686. It was centre of Filek sanjak firstly in Budin Eyalet, latterly Eğri Eyalet. The town was growing again in the 18th century, with the guilds of tanners, weavers, shoe-makers and others being set up. It became a free privileged town in the 1790s. From 1850 to 1922 it was the capital of the Gömör-Kishont county. Industry started to develop in the 20th century, with a cannery being established in 1902.

After the break-up of Austria-Hungary, the town was occupied by the Czechoslovak Legions in January 1919. However, the army of the Hungarian Soviet Republic came to the town in May 1919, but control reverted to Czechoslovakia in July 1919. After the First Vienna Award in 1938, the town belonged to Hungary to the end of 1944. During the Socialist Czechoslovakia, food industry developed here; for example, a sugar factory was established in 1966 and a meat processing plant in 1977.

=== Archaeology ===
In 2024, archaeologists unearthed a medieval settlement spanning from the 11th to the 13th centuries coexisting with remnants of Roman furnaces. The latter yielded a collection of over 150 artifacts.

== Economy ==
The town's main trade is agriculture and food processing. Agricultural production is aimed at animal production: beef-raising, sheep farming, and farming of permanent grass fields, meadows and pasture lands. Rimavská's hollow basin is an important agricultural area, where almost all crops can be grown, including the more thermophilic ones, such as sugar beet, wheat, rye, vegetable, tobacco, vine, lucerne, and corn. Forest resources are under both state and private administration. The town also has electrotechnical, mechanical, and chemical businesses. All industrial companies were privatized during the Slovak economy transformation.

The most important transport line goes through the southern part of the county. Rimavská Sobota is 112 km (70 mi) from Banská Bystrica and 289 km (180 mi) from Bratislava. The district is also the site of former Czechoslovakia (now Radio Slovakia International, RSI) shortwave radio antenna tower facility, using a 250 kW transmitter to reach listening audiences as far away as North America. The towers and masts of the station have heights up to 171 metres.

Rimavská Sobota's tourist industry is as yet largely undeveloped, due to a lack of infrastructure, although the area possesses natural, historical, and cultural potential.

== Population ==
Historical population
Year	Pop.	±%
1970	15,509	—
1980	19,205	+23.8%
1991	24,771	+29.0%
2001	25,088	+1.3%
2011	24,640	−1.8%
2021	22,048	−10.5%
Source: Censuses

Population statistic (10 years)
Year	1995	2005	2015	2025
Count	25,436	24,425	24,217	20,964
Difference		−3.97%	−0.85%	−13.43%

Population statistic
Year	2024	2025
Count	21,175	20,964
Difference		−0.99%

It has a population of 20,964 people (31 December 2025).

=== Ethnicity ===
Census 2021 (1+ %)
Ethnicity	Number	Fraction
Slovak	13,359	60.59%
Hungarian	7315	33.17%
Not found out	1919	8.7%
Romani	329	1.49%
Total	22,048	

In year 2021 was 22,048 people by ethnicity 13,359 as Slovak, 7315 as Hungarian, 1919 as Not found out, 329 as Romani, 109 as Czech, 60 as Other, 26 as Ukrainian, 22 as Chinese, 20 as German, 16 as Rusyn, 15 as Russian, 13 as Vietnamese, 12 as Jewish, 10 as English, 8 as Polish, 5 as Irish, 5 as Turkish, 5 as Bulgarian, 4 as Italian, 4 as French, 2 as Romanian, 2 as Moravian and 1 as Greek.

Note on population: The difference values of population numbers in the table "Population statistic" and in the sections "Ethnicity" & "Religion" is caused by the use of various statistical methods.

In 1910, 90% of the population was Hungarian, Slovaks made up the most significant ethnic minority with 7%.

=== Religion ===
Census 2021 (1+ %)
Religion	Number	Fraction
None	8516	38.62%
Roman Catholic Church	6943	31.49%
Not found out	2797	12.69%
Evangelical Church	1593	7.23%
Calvinist Church	1503	6.82%
Total	22,048	

In year 2021 was 22,048 people by religion 8516 from None, 6943 from Roman Catholic Church, 2797 from Not found out, 1593 from Evangelical Church, 1503 from Calvinist Church, 169 from Greek Catholic Church, 166 from Jehovah's Witnesses, 52 from Ad hoc movements, 48 from Christian Congregations in Slovakia, 48 from Other, 34 from Other and not ascertained christian church, 32 from Buddhism, 31 from Eastern Orthodox Church, 30 from United Methodist Church, 24 from Islam, 14 from Paganism and natural spirituality, 13 from Jewish community, 10 from Old Catholic Church, 10 from Baptists Church, 6 from Seventh-day Adventist Church, 5 from Church of the Brethren, 2 from Hinduism and 2 from Apostolic Church.

== Notable people ==
- Ladislav Bartolomeides (1754 – 1825) - writer, teacher and preacher
- Teréz Ferenczy (1823–1853) - poet
- Zsolt Komlósy (1955–2005) - politician
- Gyula Köváry (1884–1967) - actor
- Paul Lukacs (1918–1982) - mathematician
- Martina Moravčíková (b. 1988) - swimmer
- Michal Obročník (b. 1991) - footballer
- Aglaja Orgeni (1841–1926) - opera singer
- Róbert Rák (b. 1978) - footballer
- Viktória Ráková (b. 1981) - actress
- Zsolt Simon (b. 1970) - politician
- Alex Tamáši (b. 1998) - hockey player

== Twin towns ==
Rimavská Sobota is twinned with:

- Kolín, Czech Republic
- Ózd, Hungary
- Tiszaújváros, Hungary
- Salonta, Romania
- Świętochłowice, Poland

== See also ==
- List of cultural monuments in Rimavská Sobota
