= List of compositions by György Ligeti =

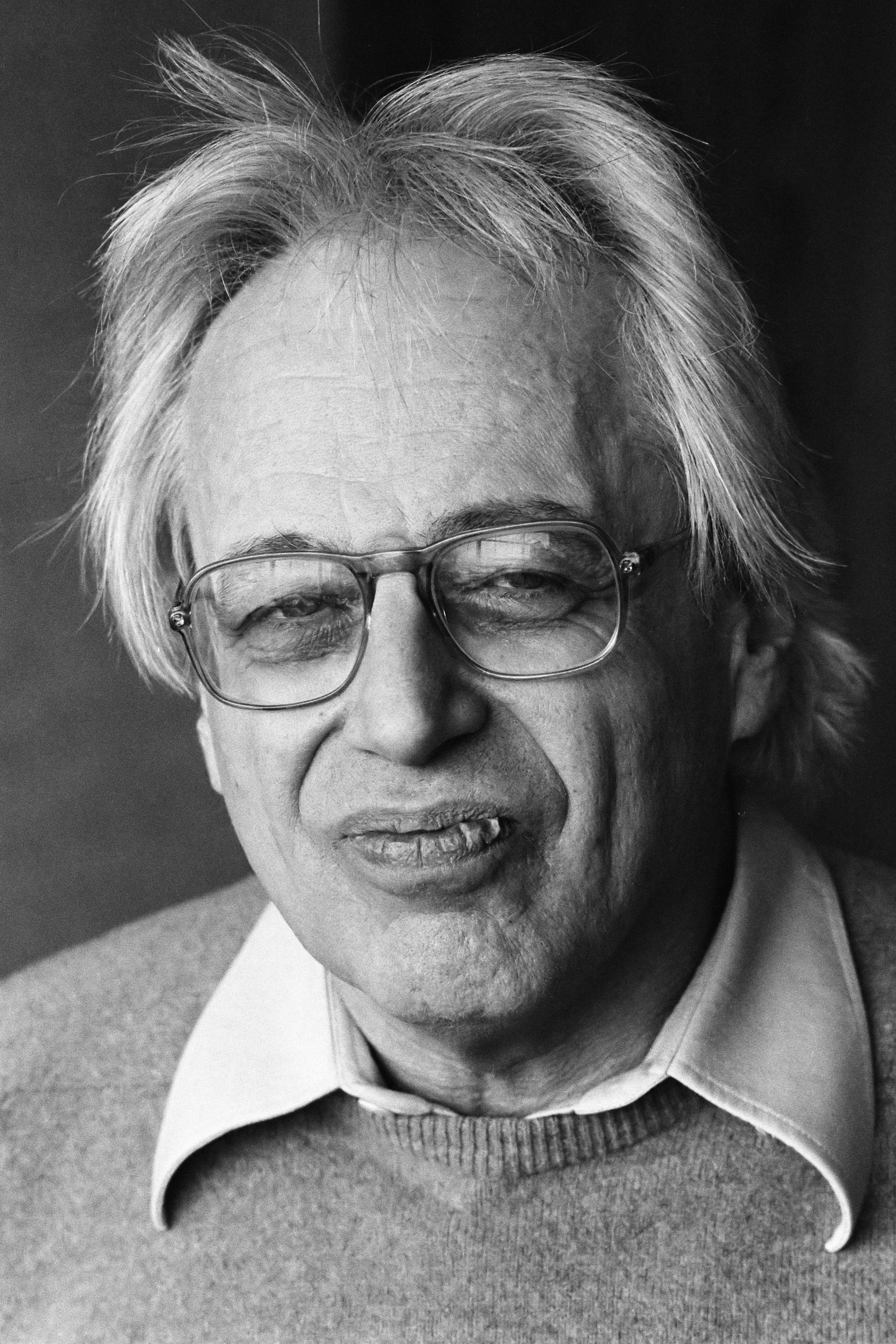
György Ligeti (1984)

This is a list of compositions by György Ligeti.

== Orchestral ==
=== Concertos ===
- Concert românesc (1951)
- Cello Concerto, for Siegfried Palm (1966)
- Chamber Concerto, for 13 instrumentalists (1969–70)
- Double Concerto, for flute, oboe and orchestra (1972)
- Piano Concerto (1985–88)
- Violin Concerto (1989–93)
- Hamburg Concerto, for horn and chamber orchestra with 4 obbligato natural horns (1998–99, revised 2003)

=== Works for chamber orchestra ===
- Fragment (1961)
- Ramifications (1968–69), for string orchestra or 12 solo strings

=== Works for full orchestra ===
- Apparitions (1958–59)
- Atmosphères (1961)
- Lontano (1967)
- Melodien (1971)
- San Francisco Polyphony (1973–74)

== Chamber/Instrumental ==
=== Works for string quartet ===
- Andante and Allegretto, for string quartet (1950)
- String Quartet No. 1 Métamorphoses nocturnes (1953–54)
- String Quartet No. 2 (1968)

=== Works for string duet ===
- Baladă și joc (Ballad and Dance), for two violins (1950)
- Hommage à Hilding Rosenberg, for violin and cello (1982)

=== Sonatas for a solo instrument ===
- Sonata for Solo Cello (1948/1953)
- Sonata for Solo Viola (1991–94)

=== Works for wind quintet ===
- Six Bagatelles for Wind Quintet (1953)
- Ten Pieces for Wind Quintet (1968)

=== Others ===
- Trio for Violin, Horn and Piano (1982)
- The Big Turtle Fanfare from the South China Sea, for trumpet (1949)
- Duo, for violin and piano (1946)

== Keyboard ==
=== Works for solo piano ===
- Four Early Piano Pieces: Basso Ostinato (1941)
- Due capricci (1947)
- Invention (1948)
- Musica ricercata (1951–53)
- Chromatische Phantasie (1956)
- Trois Bagatelles, for David Tudor (1961)
- Études pour piano, Book 1, six etudes (1985)
- Études pour piano, Book 2, eight etudes (1988–94)
- L'arrache-coeur (1994)
- Études pour piano, Book 3, four etudes (1995–2001)

=== Works for piano four-hands ===
- Induló (March) (1942)
- Polifón etüd (Polyphonic Étude) (1943)
- Allegro (1943)
- Három lakodalmi tánc (Three Wedding Dances) (1950)
- Sonatina (1950)

=== Works for two pianos ===
- Three Pieces for Two Pianos – Monument – Selbstporträt – Bewegung (1976)

=== Works for harpsichord ===
- Continuum (1968)
- Passacaglia ungherese (1978)
- Hungarian Rock (Chaconne) (1978)

=== Works for organ ===
- Ricercare – Omaggio a Girolamo Frescobaldi (1953)
- Volumina (1961–62, revised 1966)
- Two Studies for Organ:
  - Harmonies (1967)
  - Coulée (1969)

=== Adaptations for player piano ===
- From Études pour piano, Book 2:
  - No. VII: Galamb borong (1988) (adapted for two Player Pianos)
  - No. IX: Vertige (1990)
  - No. X: Der Zauberlehrling (1994)
  - No. XI: En suspens (1994)
  - No. XIII: L'escalier du diable (1993)
  - No. XIVa: Coloana fără sfârşit (original version for Player Piano) (1993)
- Continuum (1970) (adapted for two Player Pianos)

=== Adaptations for barrel organ ===
- Capriccio nº 1 & nº 2 (1947)
- Invention (1948)
- Continuum (1970)
- Hungarian Rock (Chaconne) (1978)

== Vocal ==
=== Works for chorus ===
- Idegen földön (Far from home) (1945–46)
- Betlehemi királyok (Kings of Bethlehem) (1946)
- Húsvét (Easter) (1946)
- Magos Kősziklának (From the high rocks) (1946)
- Magány (Solitude) (1946)
- Bujdosó (The fugitive) (1946)
- Két kánon
  - Ha folyóvíz volnék (1947)
  - Pletykázó asszonyok (1952)
- Lakodalmas (Wedding dance) (1950)
- Hortobágy (1951)
- Haj, ifjuság! (Hey, youth!) (1951)
- Kállai kettős (1952)
- Inaktelki nóták (Tunes from Inaktelk) (1953)
- Pápainé (Widow Pápai) (1953)
- Mátraszentimrei dalok (Songs from Mátraszentimre) (1955)
- Éjszaka – Reggel (Night, morning) (1955)
- Lux Aeterna (1966)
- Three Fantasies after Friedrich Hölderlin (1982)
- Magyar Etüdök, for 16 voices after Sándor Weöres (1983)
- Nonsense madrigals, for 6 male voices (1988–93), partly on poems by Lewis Carroll. The Alphabet was written for The King's Singers.

=== Songs ===
- Három Weöres-dal (Three Weöres Songs), voice and piano (1946–47)
- Négy lakodalmi tánc (Four Wedding Dances, adaptions of Hungarian folk songs), three voices or female choir (SMezA) and piano (1950)
- Öt Arany-dal (Five Arany Songs), voice and piano (1952)
- Der Sommer, voice and piano (1989)
- Síppal, dobbal, nádihegedűvel (With Pipes, Drums, Fiddles) (2000)

=== Works for instrumentalists and singers ===
- Aventures (1962)
- Nouvelles Aventures (1962–65)
- Requiem, for soprano and mezzo-soprano solo, mixed chorus and orchestra (1963–65)
- Clocks and Clouds, for 12 female voices and orchestra (1973)

=== Opera ===
- Le Grand Macabre (1975–77, second version 1996)

== Electronic ==
- Glissandi (1957)
- Artikulation (1958)
- Pièce électronique no. 3 (1957–58, not realized until 1996)
- Rondeau, One-man theatre for an actor and tape (1976)

== Miscellaneous ==
- Poème Symphonique, for 100 metronomes (1962)
- Hungarian Rock (Arrangement for saxophones) (1978)
