= Haj, ifjuság! =

Haj, ifjuság!, also referred to in English as Oh, Youth!, Hey, Youth!, and simply Youth!, is an early vocal composition by Hungarian composer György Ligeti. It was finished in 1952 and published in 1999.

== Composition ==
Haj, ifjuság! was finished in 1952 in Budapest, while Ligeti was still a student at the Franz Liszt Academy of Music. Ligeti was, at that time, very influence by Béla Bartók's work, and tried to follow his steps when he composed music based on Hungarian traditional songs or poems, as he also did in Lakodalmas, Bujdosó and Kállai kettős. The music used in his Ligeti's early compositions, however, were not extracted from folksongs, but were composed in his own style. Moreover, in 1952, Hungary was occupied by Russia and Hungarian culture was mostly censored, rarely published and secretly performed. It was published much later, in 1999, by Schott Music.

== Analysis ==
Even though it is usually listed and recorded in one movement, Haj, ifjuság! consists of two movements joined by an attacca. It usually takes approximately four to five minutes to perform and is scored for a mixed choir which should consist of sopranos, altos, tenors, and basses. The movement list is as follows:

1. Azt hallottam rózsám. Parlando (nem lassú)
2. Nem láttam én télbe fecskét. Allegro

This composition has been translated and adapted into German by Hilger Schallehn and into English by Desmond Clayton.

== See also ==
- List of compositions by György Ligeti
