= Éjszaka – Reggel =

Twin vocal compositions

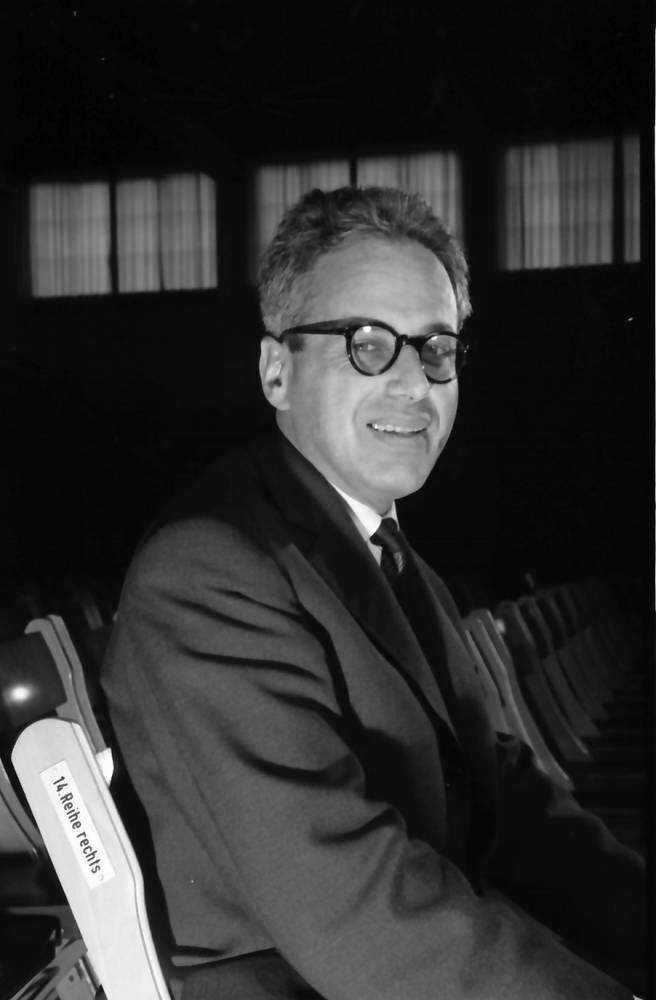
György Ligeti in 1961

Éjszaka (Hungarian: Night) and Reggel (Hungarian: Morning), sometimes also referred to as Éjszaka és reggel (Hungarian: Night and Morning) or Ejszaka, Reggel, are twin vocal compositions by Hungarian-Austrian composer György Ligeti. They were published as a set and are usually performed and recorded together.

== Composition ==
This work was composed along with a series of vocal compositions based on texts by Hungarian poet Sándor Weöres. It was composed in 1955 in Budapest but was first performed thirteen years later, on March 16, 1968, in Stockholm, with the Swedish Radio Choir under the baton of Eric Ericson. It was eventually published by Schott Music. This was the last vocal composition by Ligeti in which he used his early compositional style, for he announced that in Lux Aeterna (1966) he "broke with (his) preceding style of chromatic tone clusters". After this composition, Ligeti retook texts by Weöres again 30 years later, with Magyar Etüdök.

== Analysis ==
The composition takes approximately four minutes to perform and features some of Ligeti's traits from early compositions. The text has been translated into English and German by the composer. The piece is well known among musicians and musicologists for its use of canon for creating clusters of sound and the juxtaposition of opposing ideas.

Éjszaka is scored for a typical mixed chorus: sopranos, altos, tenors, and basses. It starts with only two words (Rengeteg tövis) being such progressively by the whole chorus in an hypnotizing Andante con moto. However, Reggel is a five-part composition, scored for sopranos, mezzo-sopranos, altos, tenors, and basses, and is a much more lively and fast movement (marked Vivace, stridente). The central section of Reggel is marked with a Più mosso. Prestissimo molto leggiero, where the choir plays very fast and short eighth notes while tenor and soprano solo voices sing Kikeriki ("Cock-a-doodle-do") using falsetto. The third section is much slower, which returns to the Tempo I, and finishes the piece.

== See also ==
- List of compositions by György Ligeti
