= Pletykázó asszonyok =

- by György Ligeti
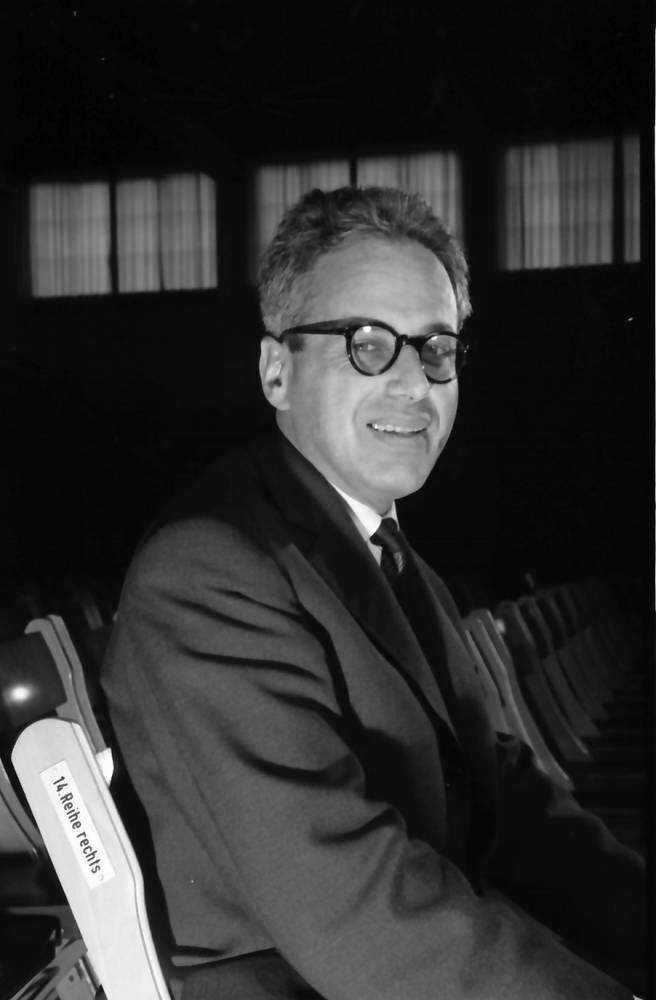
- Ligeti in 1961
- English: Gossipping Women; Gossip; The Gossips
- Year: 1952
- Genre: Choral music
- Form: Canon
- Text: Sándor Weöres
- Language: Hungarian
- Composed: 1952: Budapest
- Published: 1999: Mainz
- Scoring: SATB (but typically performed by women)

Pletykázó asszonyok, sometimes translated into English as Gossipping Women, Gossip, and The Gossips, is one of the two early canons for choir by Hungarian composer György Ligeti. It was completed in 1952 and was later published as part of the collection Két kánon (Two Canons).

== Composition ==
Ligeti composed Pletykázó asszonyok in 1952, when he was studying in the Franz Liszt Academy of Music and used a text by Hungarian poet Sándor Weöres. However, it was not commonly performed and was only published in 1999 by Schott Music as a collection called Két kánon, together with Ha folyóvíz volnék (1947). These two canons were conceived and written separately, as the 1947 composition was based on slovak tunes translated into Hungarian, unlike Pletykázó asszonyok.

== Analysis ==
This short composition takes approximately one to two minutes to perform. It is a four-part canon scored for a mixed choir which should consist of sopranos, altos, tenors and basses, even though it is typically performed exclusively by women. The text used in the composition was written by Sándor Weöres, but was never published separately. It has been translated and adapted into German by Hilger Schallehn and into English by Desmond Clayton.

Pletykázó asszonyok is a very rapid canon, marked Vivacissimo. The score has only one staff per system, and all four voices should start a bar away from each other, therefore creating tone clusters, a technique thoroughly used and developed by Ligeti throughout his career. It is usually performed three times, with no interruptions, the first time in unison, even though such an indication is not present in the original score.

== See also ==
- List of compositions by György Ligeti
