= Chromatische Phantasie =

- by György Ligeti
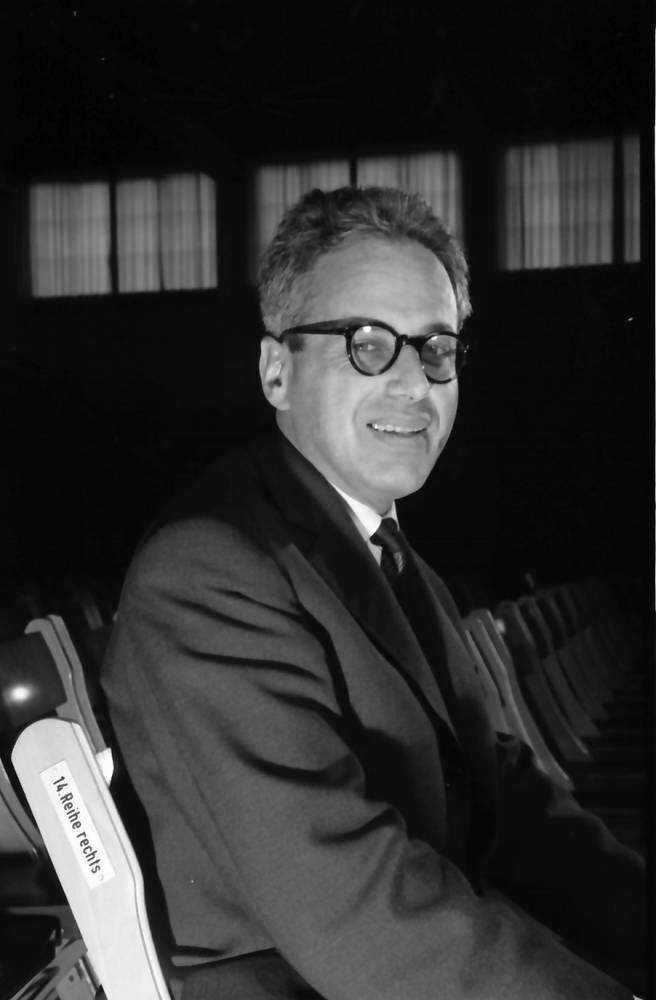
- György Ligeti in 1961
- Genre: Contemporary Music
- Form: Fantasy
- Composed: 1956: Budapest
- Performed: 17 April 1974: Nissafors

Chromatische Phantasie (German: Chromatic Fantasy) is an early piano composition by Hungarian composer György Ligeti. It is one of Ligeti's juvenile compositions withdrawn by the composer.

== Composition and context ==
Joseph Stalin's death in 1953 and further conflicts among Hungarian and Russian people led to Russia installing Imre Nagy, whose leadership led to a debilitating economy and government instability. Ligeti wrote his Chromatische Phantasie in 1956 in Budapest, shortly before going into exile in Vienna due to the Hungarian Revolution of 1956. Even though he started other projects, such as his Chromatische Variationen, Requiem (not the one completed in 1964) and many other unfinished works, this was one of the last works he composed in Hungarian soil.

It was eventually premiered in Nissafors, Sweden, on April 17, 1974, by Eva Pataki. Since then, many other pianists have played it both in public performances and on the radio, but it is still one of Ligeti's least-known works. It was never published, though it has been performed by several artists and transcriptions have been written by other musicians. The original manuscript is now located in Basel, as part of the Sacher Shiftung.

== Analysis ==
The composition is scored for one solo piano and takes approximately 6 minutes to perform. It is based on the dodecaphonic compositional technique. This is Ligeti's only finished piece in his entire catalogue in which he uses such system. The tempo is slow, marked = 60. The row is merely a descending chromatic scale from C to D♭, presented right in the first five bars of the piece. The row is put in retrograde, inversion and retrograde inversion version throughout the whole piece. Ligeti combines this twelve-tone technique with tone clusters, which he further developed in his following compositions.

Scholar Elliot Sneider, who also transcribed the piece, has analysed this composition and has divided it into five contrasting sections. Section A consists exclusively of tone clusters, with sparse notes followed by rapid arpeggios, which climax in a fff (forte fortissimo) A_{0}, which is the lowest possible note of the standard piano. This starts section B, which consists mainly of pulsating low notes with slow sixteenth notes with the right hand. A_{0} is played seven times. After that, C♯_{1} pulsating notes are played, only this time just a bit faster, which then jumps to the cluster E_{1}–F_{1} performed by the left hand. A final cluster made up of B_{1}–C♯_{1}–C_{2}, with short clusters on the right hand ends section B.

Section C starts with the left hand playing short pulsating staccato B_{1}–C_{2} tone clusters. The right hand combines both sixteenth-note arpeggios and tone clusters. A triplet from the right hand leads to a cluster chaos, repeating notes loudly. A seven-second pause leads to section D, which sings a chromatic melodic voice with the right hand, which is interrupted by sparse left-hand patterns from the previous section. Section E ends the pieces with long cluster tones as in section A.

== Reception and criticism ==
Ligeti was a fervent critic of his own work. He once described the piece as being "very naïve and primitive" in the use of the twelve-tone technique.

== Recordings ==
Piano	Record company	Year of recording	Format
Fredrik Ullén	BIS Records	1972	CD

== See also ==
- List of compositions by György Ligeti
