= Kállai kettős (Ligeti) =

Vocal composition by György Ligeti

Kállai kettős, also referred to in English as Double-Dance from Kálló, Kálló Two-Step, Two Folksongs, or its French form Kálló's pas de deux, is an early vocal composition by Hungarian composer György Ligeti. It was composed in 1950 and is one of Ligeti's collections of Hungarian pieces which the composer himself conceived as a whole.

== Composition ==
Kállai kettős was written in 1950, when Ligeti was still living in Hungary. It was never given a formal premiere, though it was published by Schott Music in 1952. It was written during a repressive Stalinist era in Hungary, and Ligeti later commented on one of the early performances of the piece:

József Gát, an outstanding piano teacher and choral director, asked me for a folksong arrangement for 'his choir', in 1950, without telling me what 'his choir' was called. He probably didn't wish to embarrass me and I thought nothing of it at the time. A few weeks later I was summoned by the state security (called ÁVÓ in Hungary). At the stipulated time I had to report to the ÁVÓ headquarters at the infamous Andrássy út 60. I was led into an auditorium where József Gát and about fifty women and men were assembled, dressed in the state security uniform of the armed border troops. They sang my work.

— György Ligeti

Some of Ligeti's other early vocal compositions are also based on Hungarian folksongs, such as Bujdosó and Mátraszentimrei dalok. He was very interested in adapting and arranging Hungarian traditional music in his own style, as Béla Bartók had also been.

== Analysis ==
This two-movement composition, about three minutes long altogether, is an arrangement of two traditional dancing songs from the Kálló area in Hungary, scored for a mixed choir of sopranos, altos, tenors, and basses. Ligeti directs that there be no break between the movements, which are:

1. Felülről fúj az őszi szél [Andante]
2. Eb fél, kutya fél [Allegro molto]

The text has been translated into English by Laurie Anne McGowan as an adaptation, that is, not for performance.

== See also ==
- List of compositions by György Ligeti
