= Saschko Gawriloff =

German violinist

Saschko Gawriloff (born October 20, 1929) is a German violinist and violin teacher of Bulgarian descent.

== Life ==
Gawriloff was born in Leipzig and received his first violin lessons from his father Yordan Gavriloff, who was a violinist in the Leipzig Gewandhaus Orchestra. He then studied with Walther Davisson, Gustav Havemann, and Martin Kovacz, the last of whom had been a pupil of David Oistrakh and Jenő Hubay. After completing his formal education, Gawriloff won many international awards for his performances, including a prize at the Paganini Competition and the Kulturförderpreis of the City of Nuremberg.

At various times, he has served as concertmaster with the Dresden Philharmonic, the Berlin Philharmonic, the Berlin Radio Symphony, the Frankfurt Opera, and the Hamburg Symphony. As a soloist, Gawriloff has played with many prestigious orchestras around the world, led by such conductors as Georg Solti, Pierre Boulez, Christoph von Dohnányi, Eliahu Inbal, Michael Gielen, Esa-Pekka Salonen, Markus Stenz, Peter Eötvös, Gary Bertini, and Alfred Schnittke. He completed a well received tour of Southern Africa in 1974.

In 1992, in collaboration with the Ensemble Modern, Gawriloff gave the premiere of György Ligeti's Violin Concerto, which the composer had dedicated to him. The American premiere took place the next year with the Los Angeles Philharmonic under the baton of Esa-Pekka Salonen. Gawriloff performed the concerto another seventy times in the following decade.

In his teaching career, Gawriloff took his first post in Nuremberg, before becoming a professor at the Musikakademie Detmold in 1966 and going on to the Folkwangschule in Essen in 1969. He succeeded Max Rostal as Professor at the Hochschule für Musik Köln in 1982, remaining there until 1996.
