= Invention (Ligeti) =

Invention is an early composition by Hungarian composer György Ligeti. It is scored for solo piano and was composed in 1948.

== Composition ==
At the time of the composition, Hungary had gone through World War II and was about to enter a Stalinist era, which would last seven years. At that time, Ligeti was 24 years old and was still a student at the Franz Liszt Academy of Music. Very influenced by the style of Béla Bartók, Ligeti wrote the composition in 1948, as an academic composition for Sandor Veress's classes. It was dedicated to György Kurtág, a fellow student of his, and was later published by Schott Music together with Ligeti's 1947 Due capricci, even though they were composed a year apart and were conceived separately.

== Analysis ==
This is a very short composition for piano, which takes around one minute to perform. When asked to write a Bach-like invention, Ligeti wrote it with his own harmonic style. This two-part invention shows a very profusely used counterpoint and features highly chromatic melodic segments. It is a very quick piece, marked Risoluto, ♩ = 88, and gravitates towards F.

== Notable recordings ==
Following is a list of some of the most notable recordings of this composition:

| Piano | Record company | Year of recording | Format |
|---|---|---|---|
| Fredrik Ullén | BIS Records | 1972 | CD |

== See also ==
- List of compositions by György Ligeti
- List of solo piano compositions by György Ligeti
- Due capricci (Ligeti)
