= Bujdosó (surname) =

Bujdosó is a Hungarian surname. Notable people with the surname include:

== People named Bujdosó ==
- Ágota Bujdosó (1943–2025), Hungarian handball player
- Bendegúz Bujdosó (born 1994), Hungarian handball player
- Imre Bujdosó (born 1959), Hungarian sabre fencer and coach
- Nóra Nagy-Bujdosó (born 1985), Hungarian basketball player

== People named Bujdoso ==
- Alexandra Bujdoso (born 1990), German-Hungarian sabre fencer, daughter of Imre
- Roby Bujdoso (born 1993), American former stock car racing driver

== See also ==
- Bujdosó ("The Fugitive" or "Song of Exile"), vocal composition by Hungarian composer György Ligeti
