= Pápainé =

Pápainé (Widow Pápai) is an early vocal composition by Hungarian composer György Ligeti. It is based on a text by Hungarian poet Sándor Weöres and reflects Bartók's influence on Ligeti.

== Composition ==
The composition was finished in 1953, as a composition for his classes at the Franz Liszt Academy of Music, when Hungary was going through the Stalinist era. The piece was not given an immediate premiere in Hungary because it was deemed too dissonant. As with most of his early vocal compositions, it was premiered some years later. The premiere took place in Stockholm, on May 16, 1967. The Swedish Radio Choir gave the first performance, conducted by Eric Ericson. It was later published by Schott Music.

== Analysis ==
This composition is in one movement and takes three minutes to perform. It is scored for a normal SATB mixed choir, but it requires SAATBB in some segments. The text is extracted from a traditional Hungarian ballad by Sándor Weöres, and has been translated into English by collaborator Desmond Clayton. The composition has a steady rhythm, marked Andante moderato (♩ = 88), and only changes its tempo towards the end, to a Meno mosso (♩ = 68) (Andante poco sostenuto).
