= Lakodalmas (Ligeti) =

Hungarian song

"Lakodalmas", commonly translated into English as "Wedding Dance", is an early vocal composition by Hungarian composer György Ligeti. It was completed in 1950, before he finished his musical studies.

== Composition ==
Ligeti finished this composition in 1950, when he was living in Hungary. At that time, he was following Béla Bartók's steps: he produced other vocal compositions based on Hungarian traditional music and poems. This composition has been later associated with "Bujdosó" (1946) and "Kállai kettős" (1950), forming a set called Three Hungarian Folksongs, even though there is no direct relation; all those compositions were composed, conceived, and published separately. "Lakodalmas" was composed during a Stalinist era, and Hungarian folksongs were strictly restricted. It was later published by Schott Music.

== Analysis ==
This short composition is in only one movement and takes approximately one minute to perform. It is amongst Ligeti's shortest vocal compositions. It is scored for an unaccompanied mixed SATB choir. The lyrics are in Hungarian and have never been adapted to any other language. However, they have been translated into English by Laurie Anne McGowan and German by Gyula Hellenbart. The lyrics are as follows:

Menyasszony, vőlegény, de szép mind a kettő
Olyan mind a kettő, mint az aranyvessző
hej, mint az aranyvessző.

Jeges a sudárfa, nehéz vizet merni
Ösmeretlen kislányt nehéz megölelni
hej, nehéz megölelni.

Vetettem ibolyát, várom kikelését
Várom a rózsámnak visszajövetelét
hej, visszajövetelét.

Van széna, van szalma a szénatartóba
megölellek rózsám a pitarajtóba!
haj, a pitarajtóba.

The song has a steady tempo of = 140 and is marked Poco meno mosso towards the end of the composition, where the eighth notes used along the composition are turned into half notes and the song turns much more static.
