= Magyar Etüdök =

- by György Ligeti
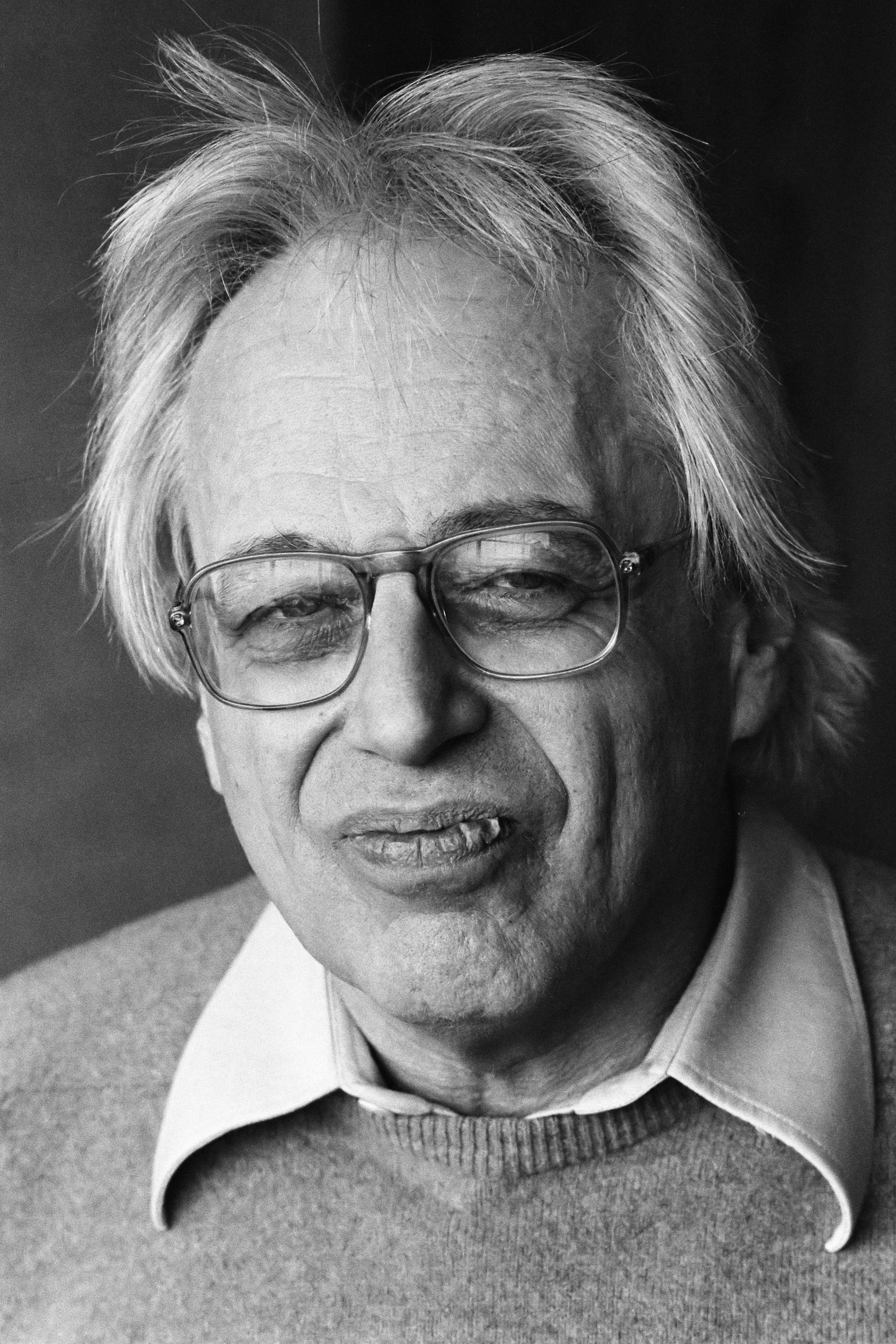
- Ligeti in 1984
- English: Hungarian études
- Period: Contemporary music
- Genre: Choral music
- Form: Études
- Occasion: Rencontres internationales de musique contemporaine (Movement 3 only)
- Text: Sándor Weöres
- Language: Hungarian
- Composed: 1983
- Dedication: Klaus Schöll
- Published: 1983: Mainz
- Publisher: Schott Music
- Duration: 5:30
- Movements: 3
- Scoring: Two mixed choirs

Premiere
- Date: May 18, 1983 (Movements 1 and 2); November 17, 1983 (Movement 3)
- Location: Stuttgart (Movements 1 and 2); Metz (Movement 3)
- Conductor: Clytus Gottwald
- Performers: Schola Cantorum Stuttgart

Magyar Etüdök (Hungarian: Hungarian Études) is a collection of three studies by György Ligeti. It is scored for 16 voices and was finished in 1983. It was Ligeti's first vocal composition based on Hungarian poems after a 30-year break.

== Composition and premiere ==
The composition is dedicated to Klaus Schöll. The composition was not premiered as a set, due to the fact that études 1–2 and 3 were performed separately. Movements 1 and 2 were first performed on May 18, 1983, in Stuttgart by the Schola Cantorum Stuttgart under the direction of Clytus Gottwald. Movement 3 was commissioned separately by the Rencontres internationales de musique contemporaine festival in Metz and was first performed on November 17, 1983, in Metz, again by the Schola Cantorum Stuttgart under Clytus Gottwald. The composition was later published by Schott Music.

== Analysis ==
The composition takes five minutes to perform and consists of three études. The lyrics of the movements are extracted from works by Hungarian poet Sándor Weöres, even though original sources are yet unknown. The movement list is as follows:

1. 9. Etüd (Tükörkánon). [Etude No. 9 (Mirror Canon)]. Moderato meccanico
2. 49. Etüd; 40. Etüd. [Etudes No. 49 and 40]. Andantino poco rubato
3. 90. Etüd (Vásár). [Etude No. 90, "Fair"]. Tempo giusto – Allegro vivace – Allegro con anima – Allegro moderato – Vivacissimo

The singers are split into two evenly distributed groups. In the first étude, both altos and basses sing only one part each, while sopranos and tenors have solo parts. It features one of Ligeti's main compositional styles, the meccanico, also used in his String Quartet No. 2 and in Ramifications. In the second movement, all of the singers have solo parts.

The third movement, however, is scored in a slightly different manner: sopranos, altos, tenors and basses from group I are all split and, together with group II as a whole, they all sing five different songs. Tempos in the third movement are different for each group. The étude starts with the basses from group I, which are marked Tempo giusto (♩ = 90); then, the two altos from group I join in with different parts, marked Allegro vivace (♩ = 160); both sopranos, which also play different parts, are the next ones to join, marked Allegro con anima (♩ = 140); both tenors from group I join in some time later, playing both the same part at Allegro moderato (♩ = 110). Finally, group II as a whole joins the rest of the musicians. They are split into two parts, sopranos and altos from group II playing one part and tenors and basses from group II playing the other one. They all are marked Vivacissimo (♩ = 190). The composition is mathematically adjusted so that all musicians end the piece together. At the end of the last movement, Ligeti demands "absolute silence" with a thick black line drawn along the entire page.
