= Due capricci (Ligeti) =

Set of Two Capricci for Piano Written By Composer György Ligeti

Due capricci is a set of two capricci for piano written by Hungarian composer György Ligeti. Both of the capricci were finished in 1947.

== Composition ==
The two pieces were composed when Ligeti was still studying in Sandor Veress's class at the Franz Liszt Academy of Music, this is, as a part of his academic exercises. These represent the beginning of the shedding of Béla Bartók's and other Hungarian composer's influence, as he was asked to write it in his own style. Strangely, the second capriccio was composed first, in the spring of 1947, and the second capriccio was composed in November 1947. Both capricci are dedicated to Márta Kurtág. The set has been published by Schott Music together with Ligeti's Invention for piano, which is put in the middle and which the set is strongly associated with.

== Structure ==
These two short pieces take approximately 2 minutes each to perform.

- Capriccio No. 1: Allegretto capriccioso
- Capriccio No. 2: Allegro robusto

The first capriccio is in a form of a sonatina, with its sections to be played continuously. Widely chromatic and modern, it is a very structured and attractive piece, constructed little motives. The second capriccio is far more abrasive, with a clear influence of Bartók's Allegro barbaro. It consists of irregular Bulgarian Rhythms with shifting accents all along the capriccio.

== See also ==
- List of solo piano compositions by György Ligeti
- Invention (Ligeti)
