= Magány =

Magány, sometimes translated into English as Solitude or Loneliness, is an early vocal composition by Hungarian composer György Ligeti to a text by Sándor Weöres. It was finished in 1946 and, as most of Ligeti's early compositions, has followed the musical style of Béla Bartók.

== Composition ==
Ligeti wrote this composition when he was still a student in the Franz Liszt Academy, in November 1946. Due to its shortness, it has never received a formal premiere, but it was rather broadcast in the Hungarian Radio and was performed together with other vocal pieces. However, it has been published by both Editio Musica Budapest and Schott Music and has been recorded by some relevant choirs, such as the London Sinfonietta Voices.

== Analysis ==
Magany takes approximately two and a half minutes to perform. It consists of only one movement, even though double bars and different tempos are used. The text, as many of Ligeti's early vocal compositions, is extracted from a work by Hungarian poet Sándor Weöres, but has also been officially translated into English by Desmond Clayton. This was the first time Ligeti took a text from Weöres.

This three-part composition is scored for mixed choir, which should consist of sopranos, altos and baritones. The score is marked Molto moderato, poco rubato at the beginning, and starts with a gloomy tune, which is followed by a joyful and fast second segment, which is marked Più mosso, non rubato and Subito: ancora più mosso, con slancio later on. The final segment, marked Subito: Quasi Tempo I comes back to the general mood of the first segment. All segment are separated by double bars.
