= Three Bagatelles (Ligeti) =

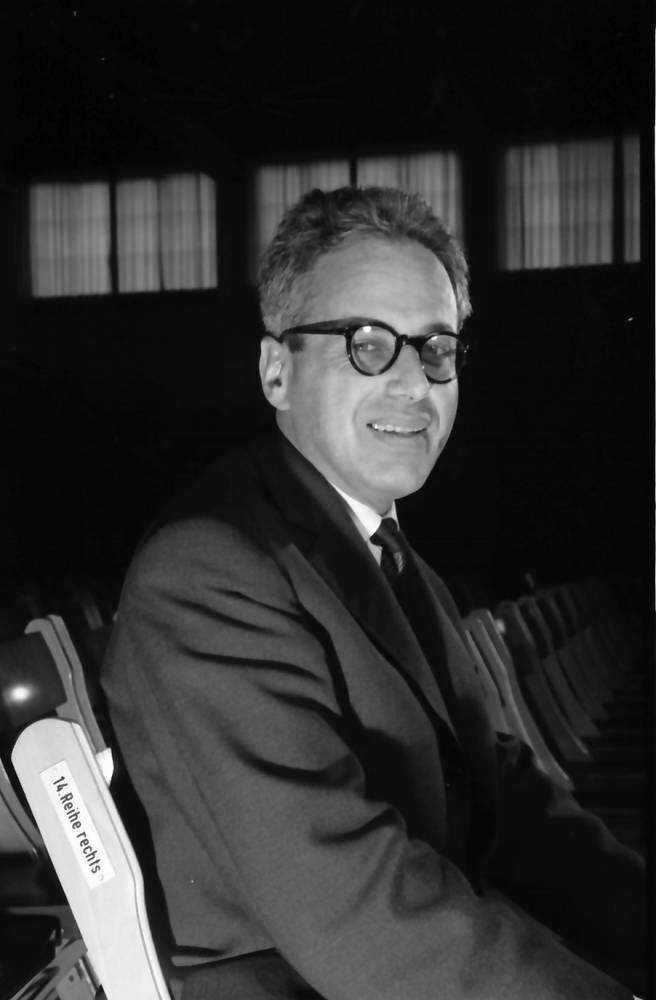
György Ligeti in 1961

Three Bagatelles, for David Tudor, better known by its original French title Trois bagatelles, is a 1961 solo piano composition by Hungarian composer György Ligeti. The composition is well known for its tacet sections. It is dedicated to pianist David Tudor.

== Composition ==
Ligeti finished the bagatelles in 1961, as part of his collaboration with neo-dadaist group Fluxus. The original manuscript is kept in Basel, in the Sacher Stiftung, as part of the Nordwall Collection, and is indeed dedicated to David Tudor. The piece was first performed in Wiesbaden by Karl-Erik Welin and was published in 1965 in New York City by Schott Music.

== Analysis ==
The three bagatelles should take around a minute to perform and should not be performed from memory, as a copy of the score is necessary for performance. The tempo indications are as follows:

1. ♪ = 40–48
2. L'istesso tempo
3. Più lento

The composition consists exclusively of one long C♯1 whole note played in the first bagatelle. Following that, the breaks between the pieces are marked by the turning of each page (one page is left blank between the first bagatelle and the second bagatelle). The piece ends when the pianist stands up and bows towards the audience. It has a certain humorous purpose. The second, tacet, bagatelle, is marked "Molto espressivo". Moreover, the score also includes a fourth bagatelle as an encore of the piece to be performed if the pianist wishes, which is marked "Tempo primo" and only includes a sixteenth rest.

== Reception ==
This composition was poorly received by the public. In a public performance of the piece by Karl-Erin Welin in Stockholm, the audience was very disappointed, as they were expecting something different. Ligeti, who was not present, stated that he was very satisfied with the reaction. John Cage, composer of 4' 33'', is said to have been deeply offended by this friendly jibe.

== See also ==
- List of compositions by György Ligeti
- List of compositions by György Ligeti#Works for solo piano
- List of silent musical compositions
