= Artikulation (Ligeti) =

Musical work by György Ligeti

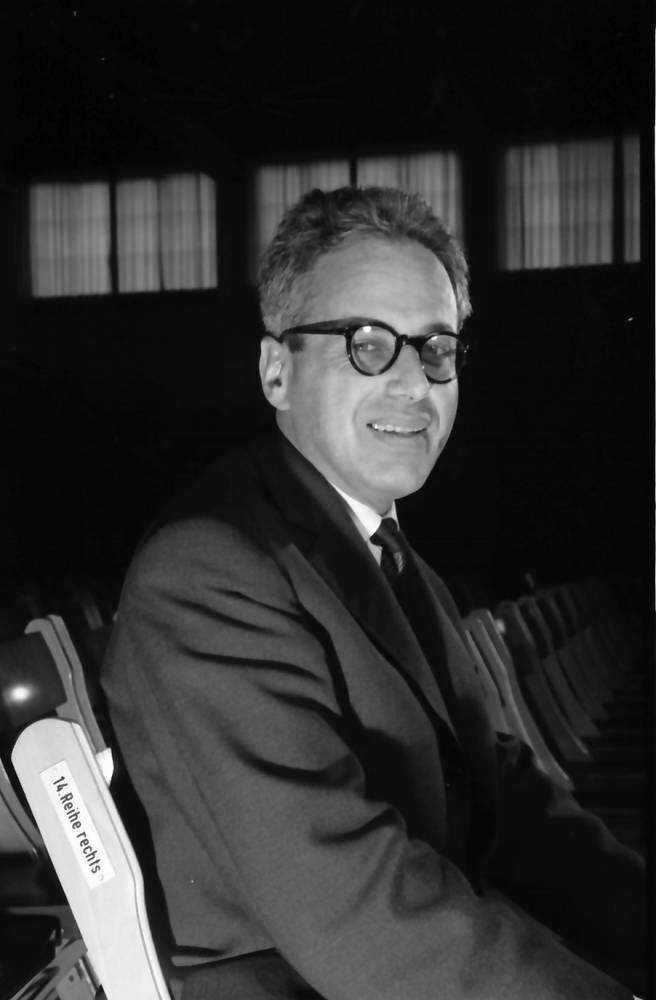
György Ligeti in 1961

Artikulation is an electronic composition by György Ligeti. Composed and notated in January and February 1958, the piece was prepared and recorded on magnetic tape from February to March at the Studio for Electronic Music of the Westdeutscher Rundfunk in Cologne, with the assistance of Gottfried Michael Koenig and Cornelius Cardew. Ligeti explained:

The piece is called 'Artikulation' because in this sense an artificial language is articulated: question and answer, high and low voices, polyglot speaking and interruptions, impulsive outbreaks and humor, charring and whispering.

The three minute and 45 second long piece, in quadraphonic sound, was premiered March 25, 1958 at WDR Cologne's 'Musik der Zeit' concert series and September 4, 1958 at Darmstadt. It was heard again in its original quadraphonic format in March 1993 at the New England Conservatory of Music, while for recordings it has been mixed down to stereo.

== Background ==
Ligeti had fled from Budapest to Cologne in late 1956 following the suppression of the Hungarian Revolution of 1956. Artikulation is the only one of the three electronic pieces that he wrote in Cologne which remains listed in his catalogue. He completed only two of these works, however: Glissandi (1957) and Artikulation. A third work, originally entitled Atmosphères but later known as Pièce électronique Nr. 3, was planned; though the technical limitations of the time prevented Ligeti from realizing it completely, it was finally realized in 1996 by Kees Tazelaar and Johan van Kreij of the Institute of Sonology in the Netherlands. In composing Artikulation, Ligeti, like many composers around him, was inspired by "the age-old question of the relationship between music and speech", their approach greatly inspired by the work of Werner Meyer-Eppler.

== Composition ==
Ligeti used electronic equipment including sine wave oscillators, white noise generators, impulse generators, and filters to create and process sound material. Both chance operations and an overall plan related to phonetics were used in constructing the work; Richard Steinitz considered it "part serial, part empirical, part aleatoric." Having conceived of many various possible and artificial phonemes, created recordings of them, and grouped them into various categories and bins, the composer created a formula to determine the maximum length of each tape used (the louder the shorter), and then went through a process of randomly selecting similar "phonemes" out of their bins, combining them into "texts", and then cutting these in half, down to "words".

First I chose types [of noise, or artificial phonemes] with various group-characteristics and various types of internal organization, as: grainy, friable, fibrous, slimy, sticky and compact materials. An investigation of the relative permeability of these characters indicated which could be mixed and which resisted mixture.

Despite this complex process, the piece has been described as, "spontaneous, even witty" and "humorous". Thom Holmes argues that, although Ligeti abandoned electronic music not long after completing Artikulation, "it seems clear he could not have conceived some of his later works [such as Atmosphères] had he not learned the techniques of composing with slowly modulating textures and timbres that came with producing tape music."

== Listening score ==
In 1970, graphic designer Rainer Wehinger of the State University of Music and Performing Arts Stuttgart created a "Hörpartitur" or "score for listening" for the piece, representing different sounds and processes with specific graphic symbols. While Ligeti's original notation consisted of a large number of charts and tables, Wehinger's score, approved by the composer, has been described as having "a unique and appealing aesthetic" and being "easy to follow when viewed aligned with the music". As shown in the key to the score:

Wehinger...focuses on the main sonic characteristics: uses a timeline measured in seconds; shapes and colors instead of the notes on a staff; different colors that represent variations in timbre and pitch; dots that are standing for impulses and combs for noise.

Tom Service of The Guardian argued that, even prior to Wehinger's score, "Ligeti himself imagined the sounds of Artikulation conjuring up images and ideas of labyrinths, texts, dialogues, insects, catastrophes, transformations, disappearances."

The depiction of frequency using the y-axis may be "very approximate". The score was later synced to the music and posted on YouTube. Though Holmes considered "the artistic value in visualizing this work...plain to see", Richard Taruskin deemed the score "decorative or celebratory" rather than "practical".

== Legacy ==
In 2003, Drew Daniel of Matmos included Artikulation in a list of the best musique concrète works for Pitchfork; he likened its length to that of pop singles and felt that the piece "makes the most out of the dramatic jumpcuts and juxtapositions which tape editing makes possible", comparing "the sudden upswoops, dropouts and hard-panned bursts of sound" to the work of Lee "Scratch" Perry and Wassily Kandinsky.

The cover of English alternative rock band Slowdive's 1995 album Pygmalion features symbols from Wehinger's score for the work.
