= Baladă și joc =

Baladă și joc (Ballad and Dance) (1950) is a short composition for two violins by Hungarian composer György Ligeti, based on two Romanian folk songs.

In 1949, before graduating from the Franz Liszt Academy of Music in Budapest, Ligeti spent the year researching folk music in Romania. Some of the songs he transcribed on that trip eventually became the basis for Baladă și joc, and also his Concert românesc (1951).

Of the work's two pieces, the first, Ballad, is slow and melodic, yet contrapuntal, and highly expressive. The second, Dance, is exuberant and very virtuosic.
