= Csönge =

- Location of Vas county in Hungary

- Location of Csönge
- Coordinates: 47.35157°N 17.06511°E
- Country: Hungary
- County: Vas

Area
  - Total: 25.27 km^{2} (9.76 sq mi)

Population (2004)
  - Total: 413
  - Density: 16.34/km^{2} (42.3/sq mi)
- Time zone: UTC+1 (CET)
  - Summer (DST): UTC+2 (CEST)
- Postal code: 9513
- Area code: 95

Csönge is a village in Vas County, Hungary. The earliest known reference to the village was in 1429 under the name Chenge.

== Famous people ==
Sándor Weöres was brought up in Csönge.
