= Mátraszentimrei dalok =

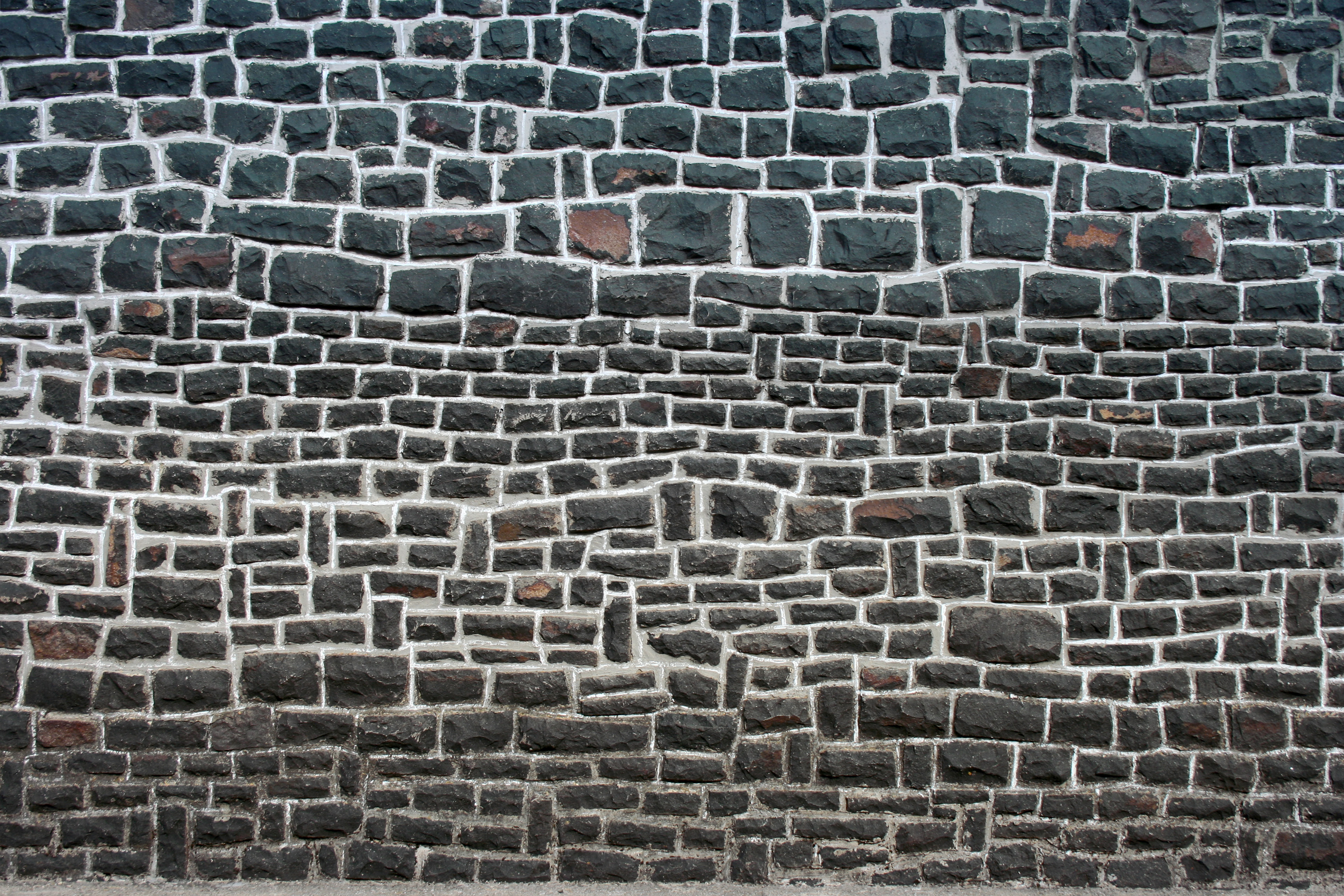
Wall in Matraszentistvan

Mátraszentimrei dalok (Hungarian: Songs from Mátraszentimre) is a collection of songs after Hungarian folk tunes by Hungarian composer György Ligeti. They are strongly influenced by fellow composer Béla Bartók, who also used Hungarian folk songs as his basis for some of his compositions.

== Composition and premiere ==
As Ligeti did with most of his early vocal compositions, this collection of pieces was composed in Budapest in 1955, but it was not premiered until June 9, 1984. The premiere took place in Saarbrücken, with Robert Pappert conducting the Kammerchor Hausen. It was published by Schott Music.

== Analysis ==
The whole collection takes approximately 4 minutes to perform and consists of four folk songs. The movements are:

1. "Három hordó" (Three Barrels). Allegro giusto.
2. "Igaz szerelem" (True Love). Andante.
3. "Gomb, gomb" (Pom-Pom). Allegretto con moto.
4. "Erdőbe, erdőbe" (Out in the Woods). Allegro con moto.

The composition is scored for a 2-part (in movements one, two, and three) and a 3-part (in movement four) children's choir, regardless of it being a boys' choir or a girls' choir. However, professional adult female singers have been used for most public performances and recordings. Ligeti stated in the original score that the last movement can be transposed one tone higher for women's choirs. The text has also been translated into English by Desmond Clayton.

== See also ==
- List of compositions by György Ligeti
