= Poème symphonique =

1962 composition by György Ligeti

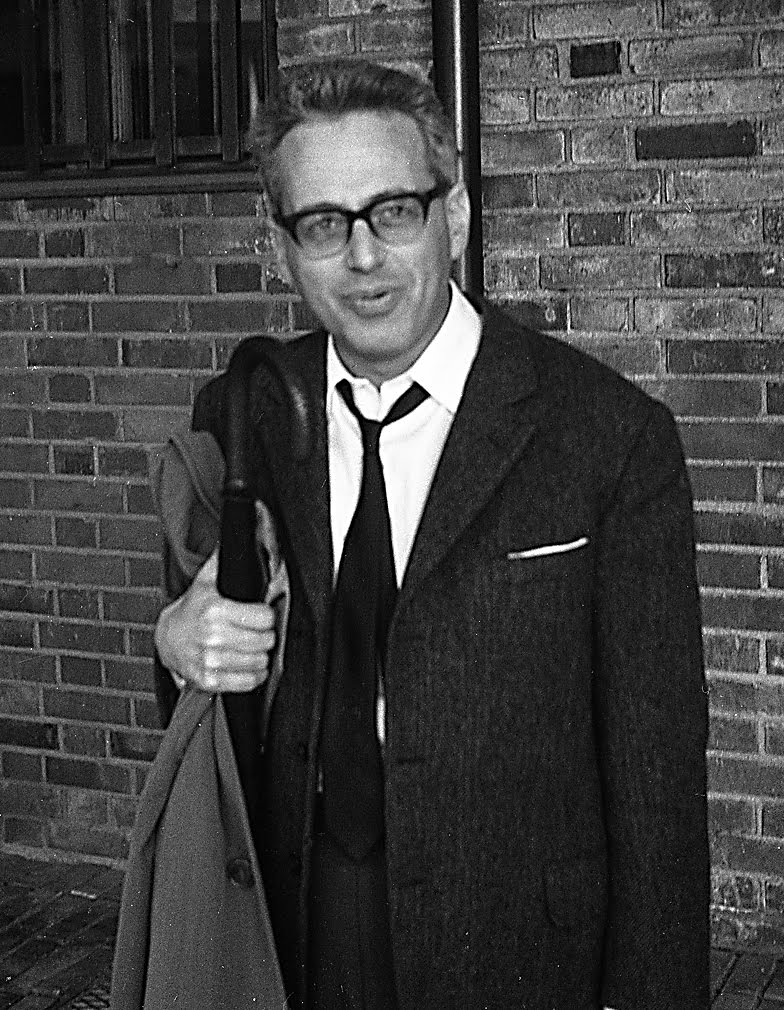
György Ligeti in the 1960s

Poème symphonique is a 1962 composition by György Ligeti for one hundred mechanical metronomes. It was written during his brief acquaintance with the Fluxus movement.

== Overview ==
The piece requires ten "performers", each one responsible for ten of the hundred metronomes. The metronomes are set up on the performance platform, and they are then all wound to their maximum extent and set to different speeds. Once they are all fully wound, there is a silence of two to six minutes, at the discretion of the conductor; then, at the conductor's signal, all of the metronomes are started as simultaneously as possible. The performers then leave the stage. As the metronomes wind down one after another and stop, periodicity becomes noticeable in the sound, and individual metronomes can be more clearly distinguished. The piece typically ends with just one metronome ticking alone for a few beats, followed by silence, and then the performers return to the stage.

The controversy over the first performance was sufficient to cause Dutch Television to cancel a planned broadcast recorded two days earlier at the world premier of the work during the Gaudeamus Muziekweek festival at an official reception at Hilversum's City Hall on 13 September 1963. "Instead, they showed a soccer game". Ligeti regarded this work as a critique of the contemporary musical situation, continuing:

but a special sort of critique, since the critique itself results from musical means. ... The "verbal score" is only one aspect of this critique, and it is admittedly rather ironic. The other aspect is, however, the work itself. ... What bothers me nowadays are above all ideologies (all ideologies, in that they are stubborn and intolerant towards others), and Poème Symphonique is directed above all against them. So I am in some measure proud that I could express criticism without any text, with music alone. It is no accident that Poème Symphonique was rejected as much by the petit-bourgeois (see the cancellation of the TV broadcast in the Netherlands) as by the seeming radicals. ... Radicalism and petit-bourgeois attitudes are not so far from one another; both wear the blinkers of the narrow-minded.

Poème symphonique was the last of Ligeti's event-scores, and marks the end of his brief relationship with Fluxus. The piece has been recorded several times, but performed only occasionally.
