= Nissafors =

- Location within Jönköping Location within Sweden
- Coordinates: 57°24′N 13°38′E
- Country: Sweden
- Province: Småland
- County: Jönköping County
- Municipality: Gnosjö Municipality

Area
  - Total: 0.62 km^{2} (0.24 sq mi)
- Elevation: 186 m (610 ft)

Population (31 December 2010)
  - Total: 285
  - Density: 458/km^{2} (1,190/sq mi)
- Time zone: UTC+1 (CET)
  - Summer (DST): UTC+2 (CEST)
- Climate: Cfb

Nissafors (Swedish pronunciation: [nɪsaˈfɔʂː]) is a locality situated in Gnosjö Municipality, Jönköping County, Sweden with 285 inhabitants in 2010.
