= Violin Concerto (Ligeti) =

c. 1989–1993 concerto by György Ligeti

- by György Ligeti
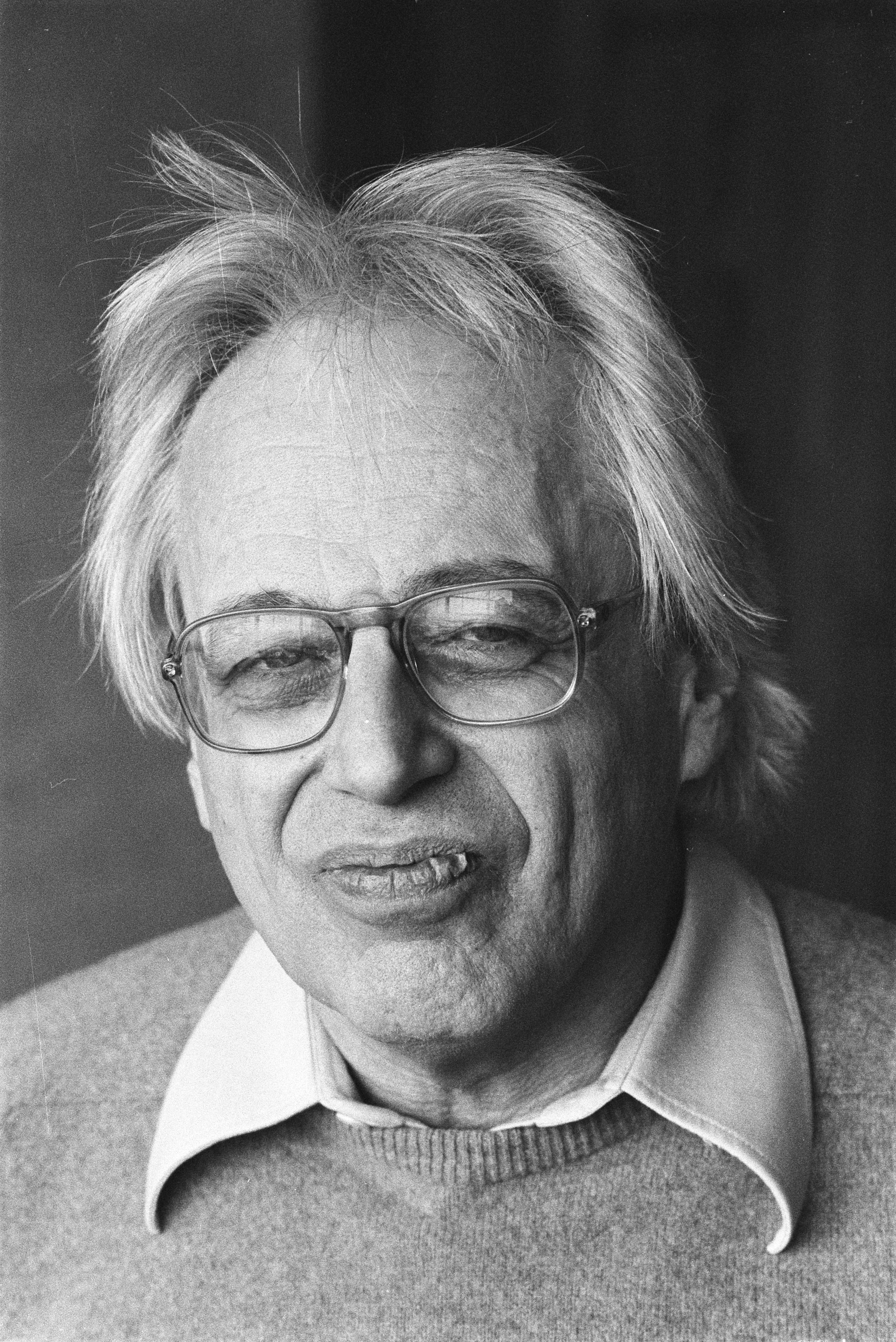
- György Ligeti in 1984
- Form: Violin concerto
- Composed: 1989–1993
- Dedication: Saschko Gawriloff
- Duration: about 28 minutes
- Movements: Five

The Concerto for Violin and Orchestra by György Ligeti is a violin concerto written for and dedicated to the violinist Saschko Gawriloff. A performance of the work lasts about 28 minutes.

== History ==
The first version of the concerto consisted of three movements. This version was performed on 3 November 1990 in Cologne. In 1992, Ligeti revised the score by replacing the first movement and adding two new movements. This new version was premiered on 8 October 1992 in Cologne. Finally, he reorchestrated the third and fourth movements, and the final version was first performed on 9 June 1993 by Gawriloff with the Ensemble InterContemporain conducted by Pierre Boulez.

== Music ==
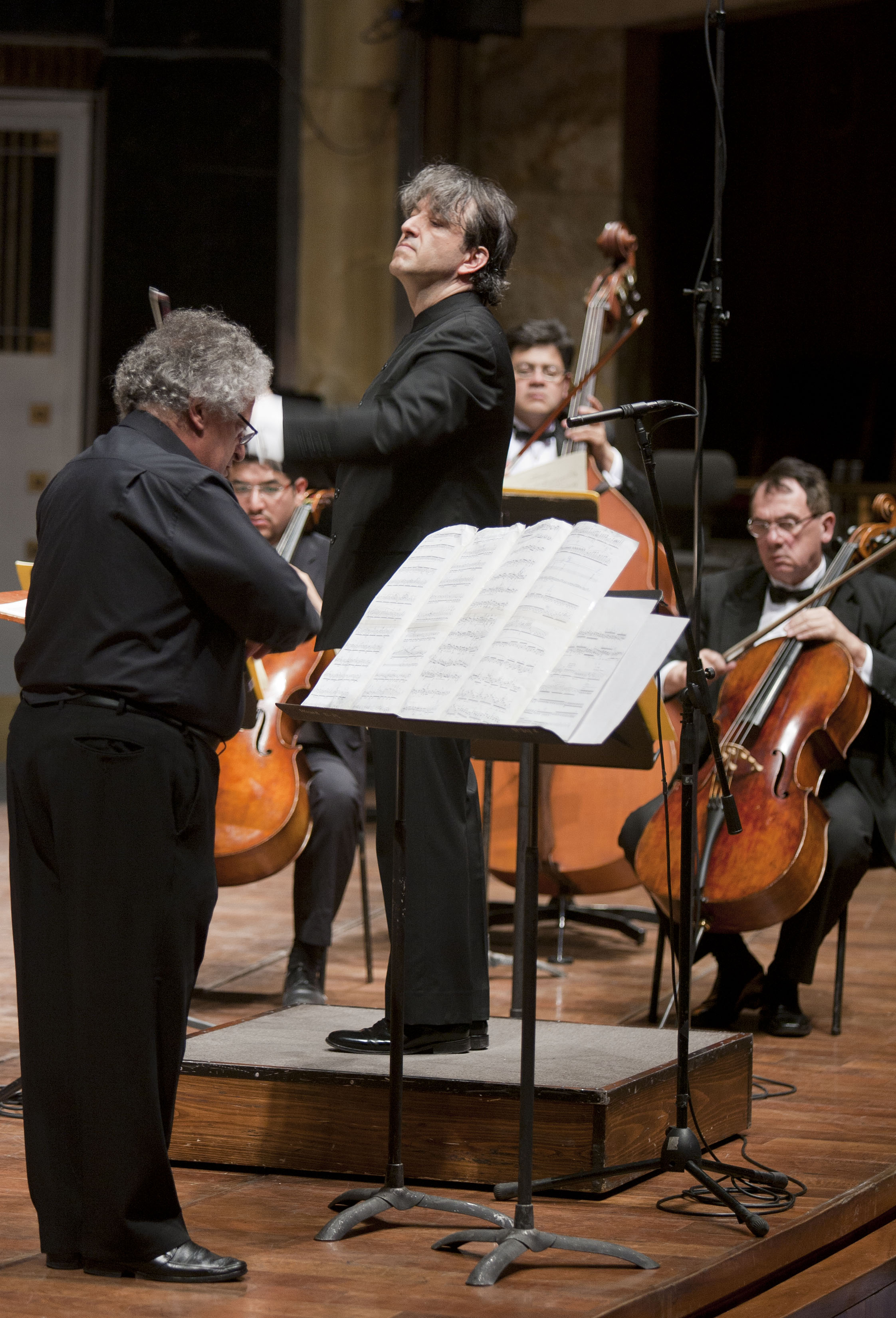
Violinist Irvine Arditti performing the concerto with the Mexico City Philharmonic Orchestra under conductor José Areán, 14 June 2014

The concerto consists of five movements:

1. Praeludium: Vivacissimo luminoso – attacca:
2. Aria, Hoquetus, Choral: Andante con moto – attacca
3. Intermezzo: Presto fluido
4. Passacaglia: Lento intenso
5. Appassionato: Agitato molto

Ligeti originally planned an eight-movement work when composing the concerto. Parts of the unfinished movements were used by Gawriloff and Ligeti for the cadenza in the final movement, which Ligeti asks the performer to devise as an alternative to the already existing cadenza. Composers who have composed cadenzas for the concerto include John Zorn, Thomas Adès, and Patricia Kopatchinskaja.

The concerto well represents his late style: a synthesis of avant-garde explorations and traditional melodic and formal conventions. The BBC's Stephen Johnson calls the concerto "a kind of cornucopia of effects and techniques, a wild collage of atmospheres and colors." Among other effects, it uses "microtonality, rapidly changing textures, comic juxtapositions... Hungarian folk melodies, Bulgarian dance rhythms, references to medieval and Renaissance music and solo violin writing that ranges from the slow-paced and sweet-toned to the angular and fiery." During this time, Ligeti was interested in alternate tuning systems and harmonics. Thus, one violin and one viola in the orchestra tune their strings to the natural harmonics of the bass player.

The second movement can be loosely described as a set of variations adapted from the third of his Six Bagatelles for Wind Quintet (an arrangement of the seventh piece from Musica ricercata) but slowed down and nearly two octaves lower.

== Instrumentation ==
The concerto is scored for a solo violin accompanied by an orchestra with the following instrumentation.

Woodwinds
2 flutes (1st doubling alto flute and treble recorder, 2nd doubling piccolo and descant recorder)
1 oboe (doubling soprano ocarina in C)
2 clarinets in B♭ (1st doubling E♭ clarinet and sopranino ocarina in high F, 2nd doubling bass clarinet in B♭ and alto ocarina in low G)
1 bassoon (doubling soprano ocarina in C)

Brass
2 horns in F
1 trumpet in C
1 tenor trombone

Percussion
3 timpani
Percussion (2 players): 2 suspended cymbals (m./l.), crotales, tubular bells, gong, tamtam, 2 woodblocks (very h./l.), tambourine, snare drum, bass drum, whip, 2 swanee whistles, glockenspiel, xylophone, vibraphone, marimbaphone

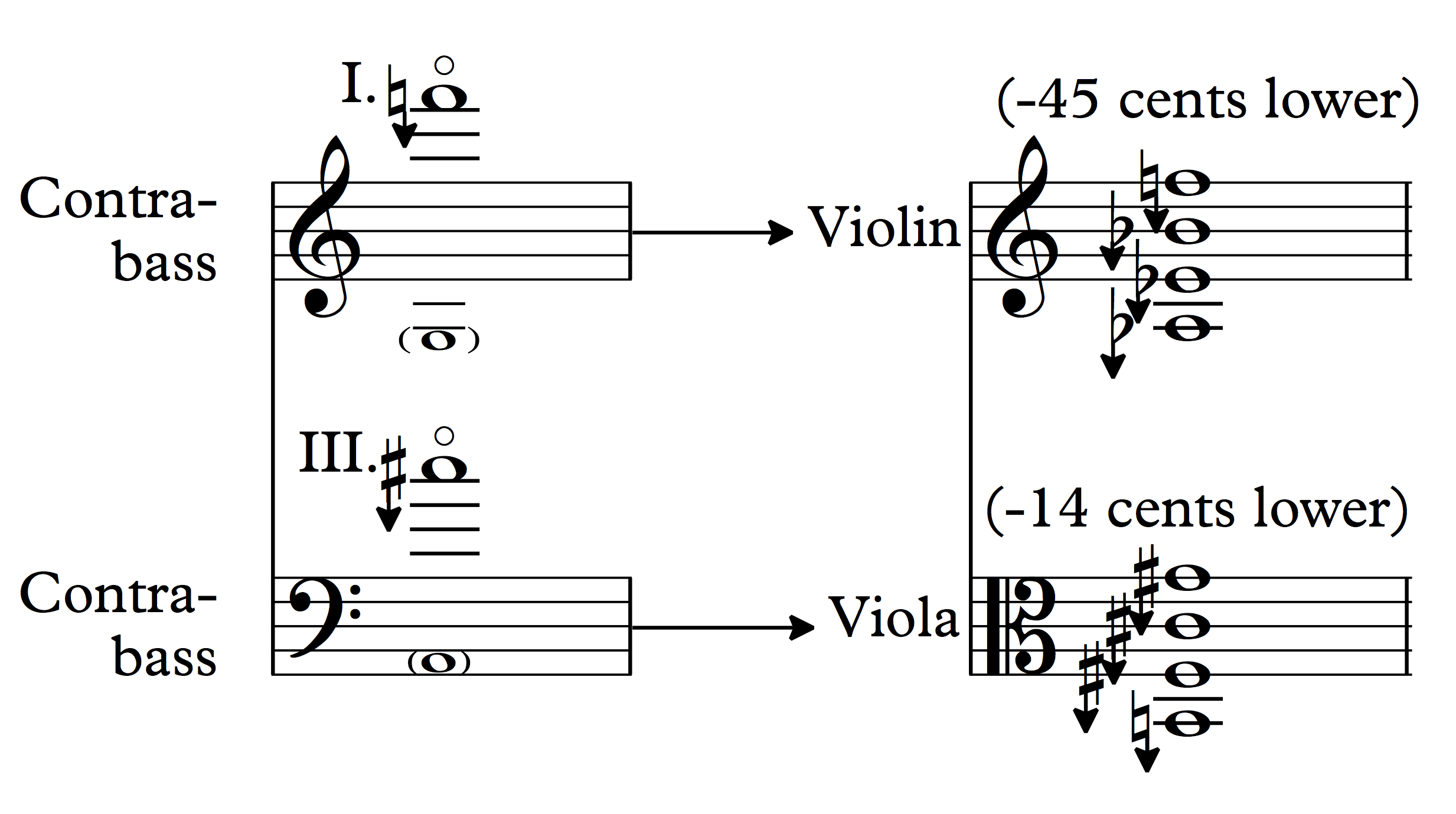
The scordatura used for the violin and viola in the orchestra, tuned with the help of the contrabass

Strings
1 violin with scordatura (all strings 69~ cents higher than normal, wherein the violin's string I tuned to the 7th harmonic partial of the contrabass's string I) (Note: Though the preface to the first publication mentions that the 7th partial of the contrabass's string is 45 cents lower, it is commonly agreed to be 31 cents lower.)
4 violins
1 viola with scordatura (all strings 114~ cents lower than normal, wherein the viola's string II tuned to the 5th harmonic partial of the contrabass's string III)
2 violas
2 violoncellos
1 double bass

== Selected recordings ==
- Augustin Hadelich: Brahms, Ligeti - Violin Concertos - with the Norwegian Radio Orchestra, conducted by Miguel Harth-Bedoya
