= Musica ricercata =

Set of eleven pieces for piano by György Ligeti

Musica ricercata is a set of eleven pieces for piano by György Ligeti. The work was composed from 1951 to 1953, shortly after the composer began lecturing at the Budapest Academy of Music. The work premiered on 18 November 1969 in Sundsvall, Sweden. Although the ricercata (or ricercar) is an established contrapuntal style (which is used by the final movement of the work), Ligeti's title should probably be interpreted literally as "researched music" or "sought music". The work presages many of the more radical directions Ligeti would take in the future, exemplifying his intention 'to build a new music from nothing'. Nonetheless, the work refers explicitly to musical precedents: movement IV is given the indication 'Tempo di Valse', IX and XI pay hommage respectively to Bartók and Frescobaldi, and movements VI, VII, and VIII each employ conventional key signatures.

In response to a request by the Jeney Quintet, six of the movements (III, V, VII, VIII, IX, X) were arranged for wind quintet as Six Bagatelles for Wind Quintet (1953).

Eight movements (I, III, IV, VII, VIII, IX, X, XI) were transcribed for bayan by Parisian accordionist Max Bonnay.

== Pitch structure ==
An important global structural feature of Musica ricercata is that Ligeti confines himself to only certain pitch classes in each movement, with each subsequent movement having exactly one more pitch class than the last. In addition, the pitch-class sets of each movement are symmetrical. The pitch classes and their axes of symmetry are as follows:

Movement	Pitch classes	Axis of symmetry (Note: In odd-numbered movements, the axis of symmetry is halfway between the two pitch classes listed.)
I	A, D	A / D
II	E♯, F♯, G	F♯
III	C, E♭, E, G	E♭ / E
IV	A, B♭, F♯, G, G♯	G♯
V	A♭, B, C♯, D, F, G	D / F
VI	A, B, C♯, D, E, F♯, G	E
VII	A♭, A, B♭, C, D, E♭, F, G	A♭ / A
VIII	A, B, C, C♯, D, E, F♯, G, G♯	E
IX	A, A♯, B, C, C♯, D, D♯, F, F♯, G♯	F / F♯
X	A, A♯, B, C♯, D, D♯, E, F, G♭, G, G♯	G♭
XI	A, A♯, B, C, C♯, D, D♯, E, F, F♯, G, G♯	(Between any two pitches)

== Movements ==
Following are brief descriptions (with some analysis) of each movement of Musica ricercata.

=== I. Sostenuto – Misurato – Prestissimo ===
This movement uses the pitch class A almost exclusively; D is introduced as the final note, thereby providing an impetus to the rest of the movements. Ligeti develops this initial, single pitch class by exploiting the dimensions of rhythm and timbre (an example of timbral counterpoint). A thunderous beginning leads into a gradual crescendo and accelerando consisting of layered polyrhythms in various registers. The coda, a metered accelerando, pounds out several more octaves of A before the final D. The relationship between D and A is reinforced by the holding of both subharmonics and overtones of D, which contain A (a result of the harmonic series).

=== II. Mesto, rigido e cerimoniale ===
Both the material and mood of this movement differ markedly from the first. The principal theme is a plaintive alternation between E♯ and F♯ (a mere semi-tone). This theme is heard both solo (i.e., in a single octave) and in quiet (una corda) octaves on both ends of the piano. The entrance of G near the middle of the piece is particularly stark, being vigorously attacked in an accelerando similar to that in the first movement. The G continues to sound in an unmetered tremolo as the main theme returns in a more "menacing" context. The movement gradually dissolves, with both the main theme and repeated G's fading into silence.

Portions of this movement were featured on the soundtrack to Stanley Kubrick's Eyes Wide Shut.

=== III. Allegro con spirito ===
The jaunty, almost bluesy, quality of this movement represents yet another contrast to what has come before. The playful juxtaposition of a C-major tonality (C-E-G) and C-minor (C-E♭-G) forms the basis for the development of the main theme. The dynamics and register also freely and abruptly jump about, contributing further to the skittish nature of this movement. The piece ends on a low C after a number of simultaneous soundings of E and E♭, thereby making the dichotomy all the more apparent without actually resolving it.

This movement is actually a reworking of ideas from the first movement of the composer's Sonatina for Piano Four-Hands.

=== IV. Tempo di valse (poco vivace – « à l'orgue de Barbarie ») ===
Another light movement, this time set in an off-kilter waltz in which the triple pulse is occasionally interrupted by a measure of 2/4. Further complicating matters rhythmically is Ligeti's indication in the score that "The metronome value refers to the maximum tempo. The piece may be interpreted freely—as well as being slower—with rubati, ritenuti, accelerandi, just as the organ grinder would play his barrel organ ["l'orgue de Barbarie"]." In keeping with this style, there are occasional abrupt pauses or changes in dynamics and indications for ritardandi and accelerandi.

The piece is formally structured like a standard waltz tune, roughly akin to AABA. The A theme consists of a running scale with a short turn at the end of the phrase. The B section is generally louder, with a greater dynamic and pitch range, with chords in the melody (not heard in the A-section). The triple-feel waltz background continues in the left hand almost throughout. As in previous movements, Ligeti chooses to introduce a new pitch class—G♯--near the middle of the piece at a fortissimo in three octaves, being especially conspicuous, though the G♯/A♭ disappears after only a few bars as it becomes subsumed by the main waltz theme.

=== V. Rubato. Lamentoso ===
To complement the previous two lighter movements, the fifth returns to the seriousness of the second movement. Again, like the second movement, the main theme relies heavily on the semi-tone interval. However, the additional pitch resources of this movement permit the construction of two trichords related by a tritone. The tritone becomes an extremely important interval in this movement, as it is introduced as part of the secondary theme in the left hand and forms the basis for the parallel harmonies heard as both accompaniment to the secondary theme and in the return of the main theme at MM 22. After this, Ligeti introduces a bell-like tolling on the pitch classes of G and A♭ which continues to interrupt the fragments of the primary and secondary themes as they fade toward the end of the movement. The movement concludes as the "bell" continues to toll in low octave G's, growing to a triple forte.

=== VI. Allegro molto capriccioso ===
Yet another abrupt change in mood brings us to the sixth movement, itself characterized by rapid and unexpected changes of dynamics, register, articulation, and musical material. A descent from E to A (thus tentatively establishing an A-major tonality) defines the initial melodic material while a scalewise ascent from A to E is heard in the left hand accompaniment. Eventually the upward and downward motives mix and recombine, jostled together in a melodic toy-box. The piece ends on an appropriately awkward and unexpected E (from an F♯-minor/B-minor polychord), leaving the listener with a lack of resolution.

=== VII. Cantabile, molto legato ===
The movement begins with a seven-note ostinato in the left hand that Ligeti indicates should be rhythmically and dynamically independent from the right hand. The right hand carries a folk-like melody that is first heard alone in single notes before it is juxtaposed in a loose canon with various transformed versions of itself, producing a lively counterpoint with rich harmonies and a sense of rhythmic freedom. Eventually, both hands move up an octave, significantly lightening the texture. The piece concludes with the right hand taking over the ostinato at a yet higher octave; the ostinato progressively loses notes until it is only a trill on F and G which proceeds to fade away to silence.

This movement is clearly based on the second movement, "Andante", from the composer's Sonatina for Piano Four-Hands. It is used again in the second movement of his Violin Concerto (1992).

=== VIII. Vivace. Energico ===
The silence of the previous movement is broken by a loud dissonance on octave D's and E's. Thus introduced, the main theme is heard in octaves, a lively and vigorous dance in 7/8. This main theme is characterized by a scalar lower melody in which each note is accompanied by an upper E. After a number of transformations of this melody in the left hand, that hand plays the theme as an accompaniment figure while the right hand plays a light, playful, rhythmically mutated version of the scalar melody from the main theme. This complete, the main theme returns in both hands in all its glory, fading briefly to a restatement of the secondary melody idea before the main theme decisively concludes the movement.

Although the rhythmic accent pattern drives the movement, Ligeti deletes beats from certain measures in order to "restart" the pattern in sections in which the left hand restatement of the theme is offset from the right. Ligeti further reinforces the folk-dance origins of the movement by using a great deal of open fifths in the accompaniment that correspond to the open strings on a fiddle or cello. In fact, the many metric "skips" and rhythmic offsets may be referring to folk musicians who accidentally enter at the wrong times.

=== IX. (Béla Bartók in Memoriam) Adagio. Mesto – Allegro maestoso ===
Another "serious" movement, this begins with low octave C♯'s, which the composer marked as "like low-sounding bells". From these depths arises a melody consisting of a series of minor 3rd pairs in a consistent sixteenth/dotted-eighth rhythm (bearing some similarity to the "Verbunkos" from Bartók's dance suite Contrasts). Both these melodic and rhythmic motives get used throughout the movement. After the initial, mournful presentation of the theme comes a suddenly loud repetition of minor 3rds in the right hand, along with a left hand restatement of the main theme marked "as if panicking". After these more agitated explorations of the theme, a much lighter texture prevails with tremolos accompanying another minor 3rd-centric melody. The piece concludes as the low C♯ "bells" continue their inescapable tolling.

=== X. Vivace. Capriccioso ===
The most overtly virtuosic movement of Musica ricercata. The seemingly free use of dissonance can be traced to the bitonality between D and C♯, from which many of the conflicting motives are derived. Beginning with a rhythmically driving low chromatic melody (alternating between bars of 2/4 and 3/8), a higher arpeggiated melody is quickly introduced as a secondary theme. After a strong restatement of the opening theme, Ligeti transitions into a set of material labeled "capriccioso e burlesco", which uses an arpeggiated melody with chromatic accompaniment, effectively a combination of the two principal ideas thus far. As Ligeti makes more and more use of the minor second dissonance between the two pitch centers of D and C♯ through further restatements of the first, second, and third themes, tone clusters begin to develop. These clusters aggregate pitches through a section marked "insistent, spiteful" before culminating in a single, large cluster using all chromatic pitch classes except C and D. This is marked to be repeated "often" and played "as if mad". After building to maximum, a rest provides some breathing room before a restatement of the arpeggio theme culminating on the first pitch class of the movement, D.

In the first performance of Six Bagatelles for Wind Quintet, the last movement (an arrangement of Musica ricercata X) was left out for being too 'dangerous' because of its dissonance and chromaticism.

=== XI. (Omaggio a Girolamo Frescobaldi) Andante misurato e tranquillo ===
The Baroque composer Girolamo Frescobaldi is regarded as an important innovator in the field of the ricercare, a forerunner of the later fugue form of imitative counterpoint. Indeed, this final movement of Musica ricercata is structured as a loose ricercare or fugue, and was later published in an organ version titled Ricercare per organo – Omaggio a Girolamo Frescobaldi in 1953.

The subject is a tone row employing all twelve chromatic pitches. Successive entrances of the theme occur at the fifth, as in a proper fugue, but always immediately follow the previous complete subject statement. The countersubject, a simple descending chromatic scale, is always heard in a voice immediately following its statement of the subject. Ligeti does not adhere to a great many constraints of fugue, however, as successive entrances often result in a great deal of parallel motion between the voices. Rhythmic values gradually diminish with successive entrances of the subject, setting up a dichotomy between longer and shorter rhythmic values in the middle of the piece. After a series of stretti that extend the outer voices to the very edges of the piano's range, the subject becomes rhythmically fragmented and irregular, eventually alighting on the final pitch class A, with which the entire work began.

== Recordings ==
The complete work has been recorded by Pierre-Laurent Aimard (1996), Fredrik Ullén (1998), Noelia Rodiles (2014) and Bruno Vlahek (2020). Selection of movements (IV, III, X, IX, V, VII) recorded by Kit Armstrong (2014).
