= Continuum (Ligeti) =

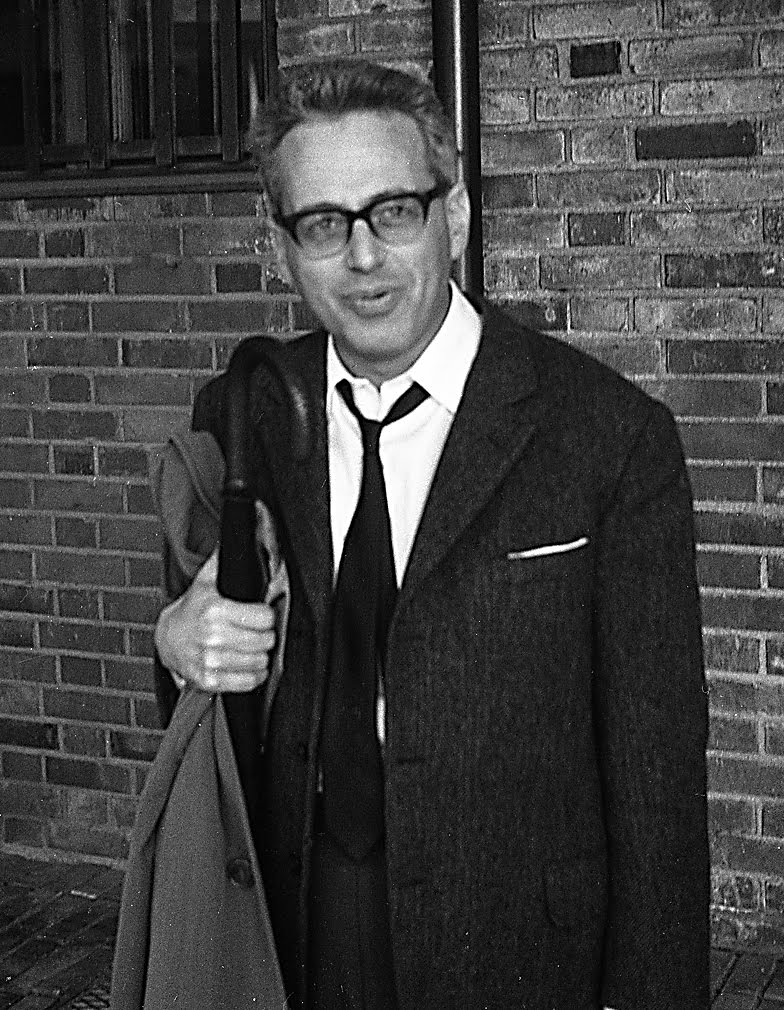
György Ligeti in the 1960s

Continuum for harpsichord is a musical composition by György Ligeti composed in 1968, and dedicated to the contemporary harpsichordist, Antoinette Vischer. The composer describes the conception and result of its technique:

I thought to myself, what about composing a piece that would be a paradoxically continuous sound, something like Atmosphères, but that would have to consist of innumerable thin slices of salami? A harpsichord has an easy touch; it can be played very fast, almost fast enough to reach the level of continuum, but not quite (it takes about eighteen separate sounds per second to reach the threshold where you can no longer make out individual notes and the limit set by the mechanism of the harpsichord is about fifteen to sixteen notes a second). As the string is plucked by the plectrum, apart from the tone you also hear quite a loud noise. The entire process is a series of sound impulses in rapid succession which create the impression of continuous sound.

Amy Bauer (2004, p. 130) describes the piece as trompe-l'œil, creating "a sense of stasis through extremely rapid activity." She compares it to a patient's description of the schizophrenic experience of, "an intense cerebral activity in which inner experiences took place at greatly increased speed, so that much more than usual happened per minute of external time. The result was to give an effect of slow motion." (Sass 1992)

This piece has also been arranged for barrel organ and for two player pianos by the composer.

The piece has also been compared by classical music reviewers to the magnetic fluctuations of comet 67P/Churyumov–Gerasimenko as detected by the space probe Philae after the fluctuations were artistically sonificated by a German composer and sound designer to make them audible.

Ligeti also wrote two subsequent works for solo harpsichord: Passacaglia ungherese (1978) and Hungarian Rock (Chaconne) (1978).

== Sources ==
- Bauer, Amy (2004). "'Tone-Color, Movement, Changing Harmonic Planes': Cognition, Constraints and Conceptual Blends", The Pleasure of Modernist Music. University of Rochester Press. ISBN 1-58046-143-3.
- Ligeti in Conversation. Cited in Bauer.
- Sass (1992). Madness and Modernism: Insanity in the Light of Modern Art, Literature, and Thought. New York: Basic Books. Cited in Bauer.
- Amazon.com (2007) Amazon.com: Ligeti: Mechanical Music: Music: Gyorgy Ligeti, Pierre Charial, Jürgen Hocker, Françoise Terrioux (accessed April 14, 2007)
- Ligeti, György, Péter Várnai, Josef Häusler, and Claude Samuel. György Ligeti in Conversation with Péter Várnai, Josef Häusler, Claude Samuel, and Himself. London: Eulenburg, 1983.
- "Jede zeitliche Folge von Tönen, Klängen, musikalischen Gestalten" hat Rhythmus. Über die Rhythmik in Ligetis Cembalostück Continuum von Peter Petersen, 2008, PDF on: www.saitenspiel.org
