= Ramifications (Ligeti) =

Composition for strings by György Ligeti

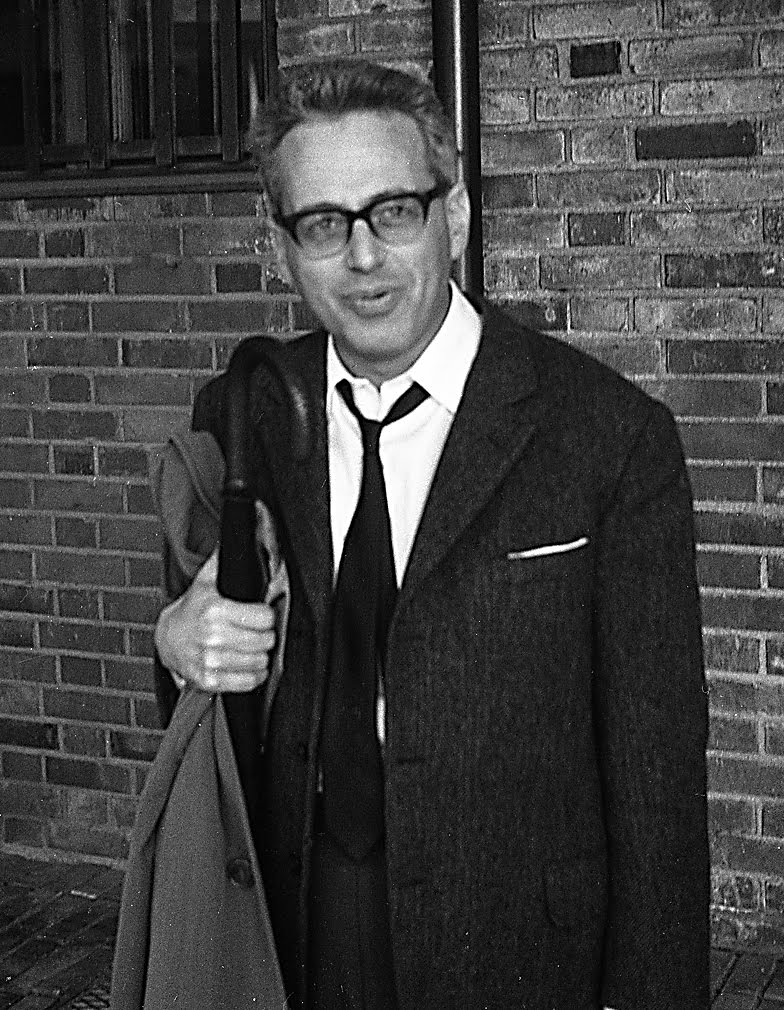
György Ligeti in the 1960s

Ramifications is a composition for strings by Hungarian composer György Ligeti. It was finished in 1968 and premiered in 1969.

== Composition and premiere ==
The composition is dedicated to Serge Koussevitzky and his wife, Natalia Koussevitzky and is meant to be a gift for the Koussevitzky Music Foundation in the Library of Congress. The first version, for string orchestra, was premiered in Berlin on April 23, 1969. Michael Gielen conducted the Radio-Sinfonie-Orchester Berlin on this occasion. The version for 12 soloists was premiered a few months later, on October 10, 1969, in Saarbrücken, with the Kammerorchester des Saarländischen Rundfunks under the baton of Antonio Janigro.

== Analysis ==
The piece is in one movement, and takes approximately eight minutes to perform. It is scored for an ensemble of 12 strings, split into two groups: Group I comprises four violins, one viola, and one cello; and Group II comprises three violins, one viola, one cello, and one double bass. Moreover, Group I is tuned a quarter tone higher (approximately A=453) than Group II, which is in standard tuning.

In addition, conventional barring is used merely for synchronization and does not function as a metric indicator. Accordingly, no stresses are made when performing the piece, and the piece is meant to be performed fluently and without discernible rhythm. The composition aims to sound as a heterogeneous, amorphous texture in which the two groups try to retune each other. Ligeti's intention was not to create microtonal music, but to create "mistuned music" instead. The performers are seated near to each other, so that the audience can listen to the music as if it is coming from only one source.

The composition is presented in two different versions: one for 12 soloists and one for a string orchestra. For the orchestra version, it is recommended that the instruments are distributed in a balanced manner. Only the orchestra version makes distinctions when performing tutti and solo parts. However, Ligeti himself preferred the version for soloists.

== Notable recordings ==
Following are some of the most well-known recordings of this piece:

Orchestra	Conductor	Record company	Year of recording	Format
Orchestre de Chambre de Toulouse	Louis Auriacombe	EMI Classics	1970	CD
Ensemble InterContemporain	Pierre Boulez	Deutsche Grammophon/PolyGram	1982	CD
