= Bujdosó =

Bujdosó, commonly known in English as The Fugitive or Song of Exile, is an early vocal composition by Hungarian composer György Ligeti. It was finished in 1946 and is strongly influenced by Béla Bartók.

== Composition ==
This composition was written in 1946. At that time, Ligeti was living in Hungary and was very interested in Hungarian folk music, like other Hungarian composers such as Béla Bartók. Like most of Ligeti's juvenilia, this piece never received a formal premiere, but it has been recorded together with other early vocal compositions. It was later published by Schott Music in 1999.

== Analysis ==
This work takes approximately two minutes to perform. It is scored for a mixed choir which should consist of sopranos, altos, and baritones. The text is extracted from a Hungarian traditional poem, which is as follows:

Fölkelt már a csillag Lengyelország felé
Magam is elmegyek, babám, arra felé
Megvetették nekem a megfogó hálót
Megfogtak engemet mint egy utonállót

Lám, megmondtam, rózsám, ne szeress engemet
mert Somogy vármegye hajszoltat engemet
A tömlöc feneke az én vetett ágyam
annak a teteje takaró vánkosom.

The piece is marked Nyugodtan (♩ = 108), which can be translated as "calmly". Tempo changes to Adagio towards the end of the piece, and time signature changes are present throughout the whole composition. The lyrics have been translated into German by Hilgen Schallehn and into English by Desmond Clayton.

== See also ==
- List of compositions by György Ligeti
