= Sándor Weöres =

Hungarian poet and author

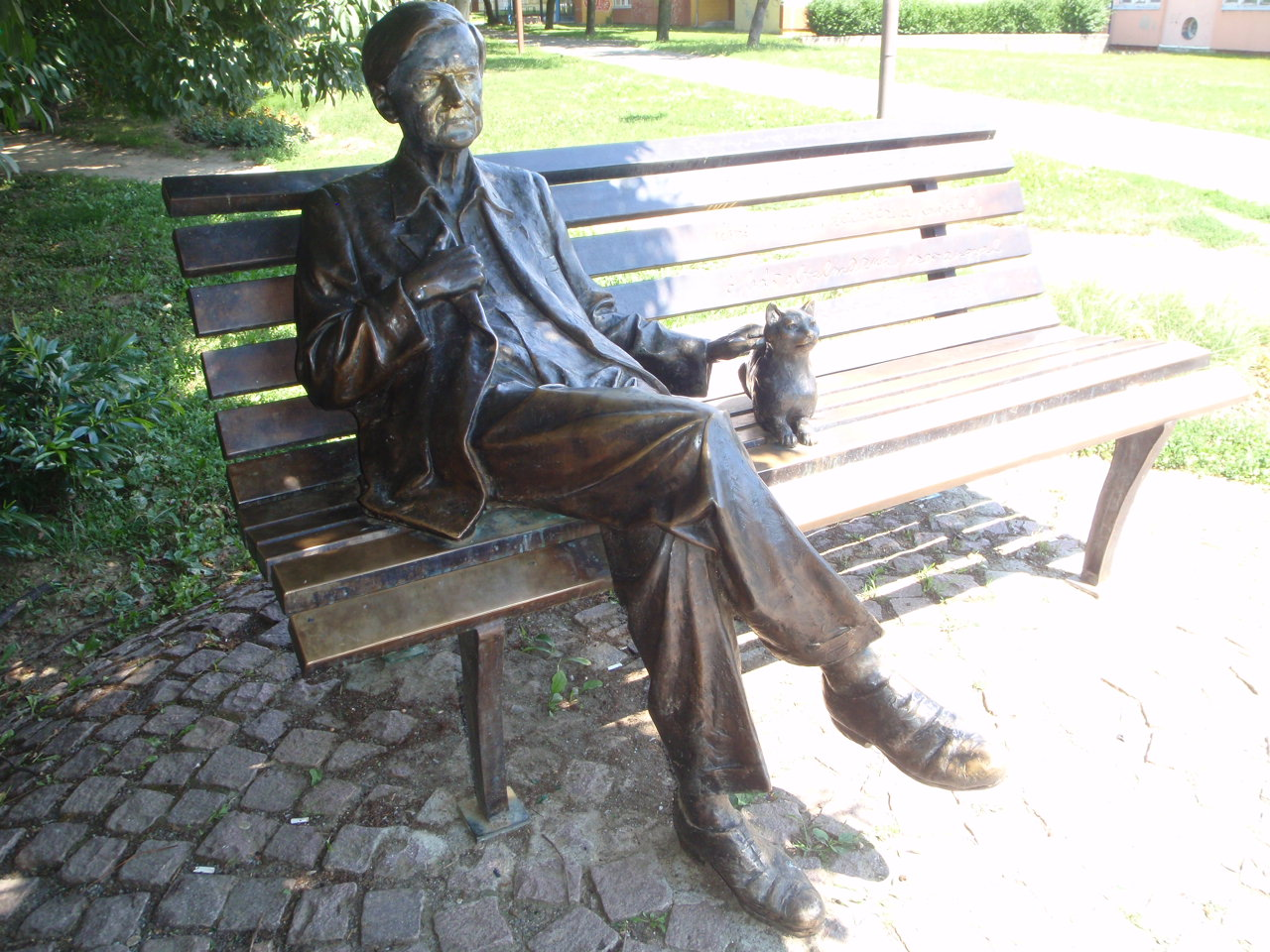
- Statue of Sándor Weöres
- Born: Sándor Weöres; 22 June 1913; Szombathely, Kingdom of Hungary
- Died: 22 January 1989 (aged 75); Budapest, Hungary
- Resting place: Farkasréti Cemetery, Budapest
- Education: Elizabeth University (Ph.D., 1939)
- Occupations: Poet, writer, translator
- Spouse: Amy Károlyi (m. 1947)
- Awards: Kossuth Prize (1970); Austrian State Prize for European Literature (1974)

Sándor Weöres (Hungarian pronunciation: [ˈʃaːndor ˈvørøʃ]; 22 June 1913 – 22 January 1989) was a Hungarian poet and author.

Born in Szombathely, Weöres was brought up in the nearby village of Csönge. His first poems were published when he was fourteen, in the influential journal Nyugat ("West"), through the acceptance of its editor, the poet Mihály Babits. Weöres attended the University of Pécs, first studying law before moving on to geography and history. He ultimately received a doctorate in philosophy and aesthetics. His doctoral dissertation The Birth of the Poem was published in 1939. It was in 1937 that he made the first of his travels abroad, going first to Manila for a Eucharistic Congress and then visiting Vietnam and India. During World War II Weöres was drafted for compulsory labor, but was not sent to the front. After the end of the war, he returned to Csönge and briefly lived as a farmer.

In 1948 Weöres again travelled abroad, living in Italy until 1949. In 1951 he settled in Budapest where he would reside for the rest of his life.

== Work ==
Weöres' translations into Hungarian were wide and varied, including the works of Ukrainian national poet Taras Shevchenko, the Georgian poet Rustaveli, the Slovenian poets Oton Župančič and Josip Murn Aleksandrov. He translated Indian poet Jai dev's poetry Gita Govinda from Sanskrit. He also translated Shakespeare's Venus and Adonis and Henry VIII, T. S. Eliot's The Waste Land, the nonsense poems by Edward Lear and Lewis Carroll, the complete poetry of Stéphane Mallarmé,. His translation of the Tao Te Ching continues to be the most widely read in Hungary.

== Legacy ==
Many of Weöres' poems have been set to music. Zoltán Kodály composed a choral piece to the text of the 14-year-old poet's poem Öregek (“Old People”). György Ligeti, a friend of the poet, set several poems from Rongyszőnyeg and other books in the composition Síppal, dobbal, nádihegedüvel. Composer Peter Eötvös has composed two pieces, Atlantis and Ima with texts from Weöres' poem Néma zene ("Silent Music"), and in 2013 he composed Speaking Drums (Four Poems for Percussion Solo and Orchestra) based on the poems by Sándor Weöres.

In 1980 the Hungarian filmmaker Gábor Bódy adapted the poem Psyché to make the epic feature Nárcisz és Psyché.

== Works ==
=== Works in English ===
- Eternal Moment: Selected Poems by Sandor Weores, 1988
- Selected Poems, 1970
- Self-portrait: Selected poems by Sándor Weöres, 1991

=== Poetry ===
- Hideg van, 1934
- A kő és az ember, 1935
- A teremtés dicsérete, 1938
- Meduza, 1944
- A szerelem ábécéje, 1946
- Elysium, 1946
- Gyümölcskosár, 1946
- A fogok tornáca, 1947
- Bóbita, 1955
- A hallgatás tornya, 1956
- Tarka forgó, 1958
- Tűzkút, 1964
- Gyermekjátékok, 1965
- Merülő Saturnus, 1968
- Zimzizim, 1969
- Psyche, 1972
- Télország, 1972
- Priapos, written in 1950, published posthumously in 2001
