= György Ligeti =

Hungarian composer (1923–2006)

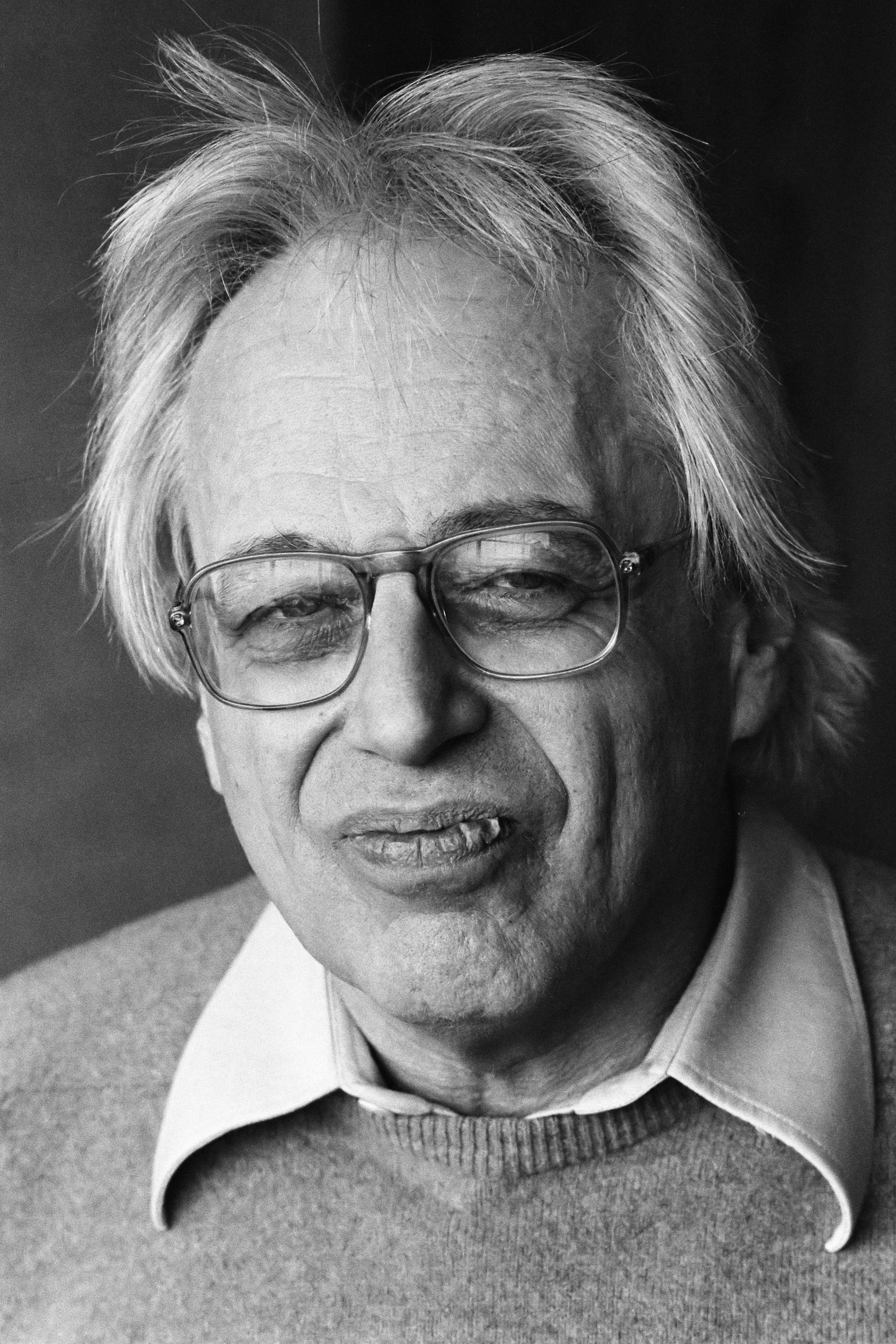
- Ligeti in 1984
- Born: 28 May 1923; Diciosânmartin, Transylvania, Romania
- Died: 12 June 2006 (aged 83); Vienna, Austria
- Occupations: Composer; Academic teacher
- Works: List of compositions
- Awards: Ernst von Siemens Music Prize

György Sándor Ligeti ( /ˈlɪɡəti/; Hungarian: [ˈliɡɛti ˈɟørɟ ˈʃaːndor]; 28 May 1923 – 12 June 2006) was a Hungarian composer of contemporary classical music. He has been described as "one of the most important avant-garde composers in the latter half of the twentieth century" and "one of the most innovative and influential among progressive figures of his time".

Born in Romania, he lived in the Hungarian People's Republic before emigrating to Austria in 1956. He became an Austrian citizen in 1968. In 1973 he became professor of composition at the Hochschule für Musik und Theater Hamburg, where he worked until retiring in 1989. His students included Hans Abrahamsen, Unsuk Chin and Michael Daugherty. He died in Vienna in 2006.

Restricted in his musical style by the authorities of Communist Hungary, only when he reached the West in 1956 could Ligeti fully realise his passion for avant-garde music and develop new compositional techniques. After experimenting with electronic music in Cologne, Germany, his breakthrough came with orchestral works such as Atmosphères, for which he used a technique he later dubbed micropolyphony. After writing his "anti-anti-opera" Le Grand Macabre, Ligeti shifted away from chromaticism and towards polyrhythm for his later works.

He is best known by the public through the use of his music in film soundtracks. Although he did not directly compose any film scores, excerpts of pieces composed by him were taken and adapted for film use. The sound design of Stanley Kubrick's films, particularly the music of 2001: A Space Odyssey, drew from Ligeti's work.

== Biography ==
=== Early life ===
Ligeti was born in 1923 at Diciosânmartin (Dicsőszentmárton; renamed to Târnăveni in 1941) in Romania, to Dr. Sándor Ligeti and Dr. Ilona Somogyi. His family was Hungarian Jewish. He was the great-grandnephew of violinist Leopold Auer and second cousin of Hungarian philosopher Ágnes Heller. Some sources say he was Auer's grandnephew, rather than great-grandnephew.

Ligeti recalled that his first exposure to languages other than Hungarian came one day while listening to a conversation between Romanian-speaking town police. Before that, he didn't know that other languages existed. He moved to Cluj with his family when he was six years old. He did not return to the town of his birth until the 1990s. In 1940, Northern Transylvania became part of Hungary following the Second Vienna Award, thus Cluj became part of Hungary as well.

In 1941 Ligeti received his initial musical training at the conservatory in Kolozsvár (Cluj), and during the summers privately with Pál Kadosa in Budapest. In 1944, Ligeti's education was interrupted when he was sent to a forced labor brigade by the Horthy regime during events of the Holocaust. His brother Gábor, age 16, was deported to the Mauthausen-Gusen concentration camp and his parents were sent to Auschwitz. His mother was the only person alongside Ligeti to survive in his immediate family.

Following World War II, Ligeti returned to his studies in Budapest, graduating in 1949 from the Franz Liszt Academy of Music. He studied under Pál Kadosa, Ferenc Farkas, Zoltán Kodály and Sándor Veress. He conducted ethnomusicological research into the Hungarian folk music of Transylvania. However, after a year he returned to Franz Liszt Academy in Budapest, this time as a teacher of harmony, counterpoint, and musical analysis. He secured this position with the help of Kodály and held it from 1950 to 1956. As a young teacher, Ligeti took the unusual step of regularly attending the lectures of an older colleague, the conductor, and musicologist Lajos Bárdos, a conservative Christian whose circle represented a safe haven for Ligeti. The composer acknowledged Bárdos's help and advice in the prefaces to his two harmony textbooks (1954 and 1956). Due to the restrictions of the communist government, communications between Hungary and the West by then had become difficult, and Ligeti and other artists were effectively cut off from recent developments outside the Eastern Bloc.

=== After leaving Hungary ===
In December 1956, two months after the Hungarian uprising was violently suppressed by the Soviet Army, Ligeti fled to Vienna with his ex-wife Vera Spitz. They remarried in 1957 and had a son together. He would not see Hungary again for fourteen years, when he was invited there to judge a competition in Budapest. On his rushed escape to Vienna, he left most of his Hungarian compositions in Budapest, some of which are now lost. He took only what he considered to be his most important pieces. He later said, "I considered my old music of no interest. I believed in twelve-tone music!" He eventually took Austrian citizenship in 1968.

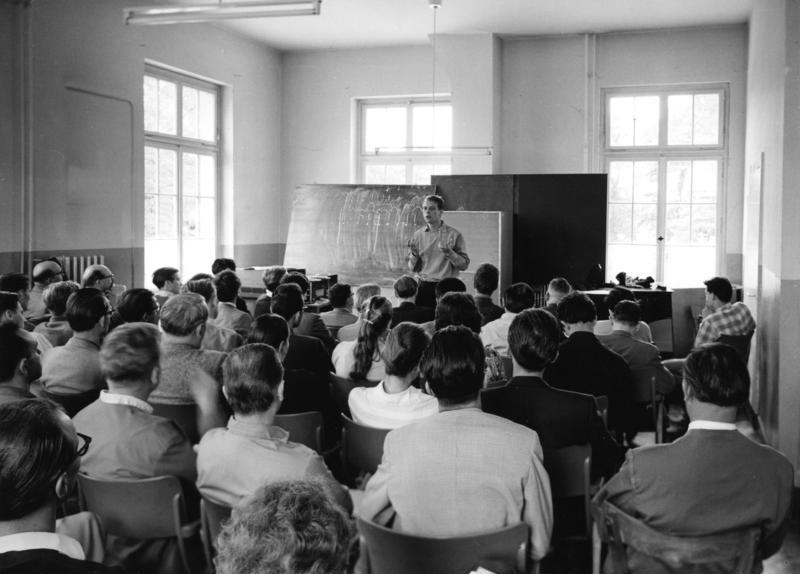
Karlheinz Stockhausen lecturing at the Darmstädter Ferienkurse, July 1957

A few weeks after arriving in Vienna, Ligeti left for Cologne. There he met several key avant-garde figures and learned more contemporary musical styles and methods. These people included the composers Karlheinz Stockhausen and Gottfried Michael Koenig, both then working on groundbreaking electronic music. During the summer, he attended the Darmstädter Ferienkurse. Ligeti worked in the Cologne Electronic Music Studio with Stockhausen and Koenig and was inspired by the sounds he heard there. However, he produced little electronic music of his own, instead concentrating on instrumental works which often contain electronic-sounding textures.

After about three years' working with them, he fell out with the Cologne School of Electronic Music, because there was much factional in-fighting: "there were [sic] a lot of political fighting because different people, like Stockhausen, like Kagel wanted to be first. And I, personally, have no ambition to be first or to be important."

Between 1961 and 1971 he was guest professor for composition in Stockholm. In 1972 he became composer-in-residence at Stanford University in the United States.

In 1973 Ligeti became professor of composition at the Hamburg Hochschule für Musik und Theater, eventually retiring in 1989. While he was living in Hamburg, his wife Vera remained in Vienna with their son, Lukas, who later also became a composer.

Invited by Walter Fink, Ligeti was the first composer featured in the annual Komponistenporträt of the Rheingau Musik Festival in 1990.

Apart from his far-reaching interest in different styles of music, from Renaissance to African music, Ligeti was also interested in literature (including the writers Lewis Carroll, Jorge Luis Borges, and Franz Kafka), painting, architecture, science, and mathematics. He was especially fascinated by the fractal geometry of Benoit Mandelbrot and the writings of Douglas Hofstadter.

=== Death ===
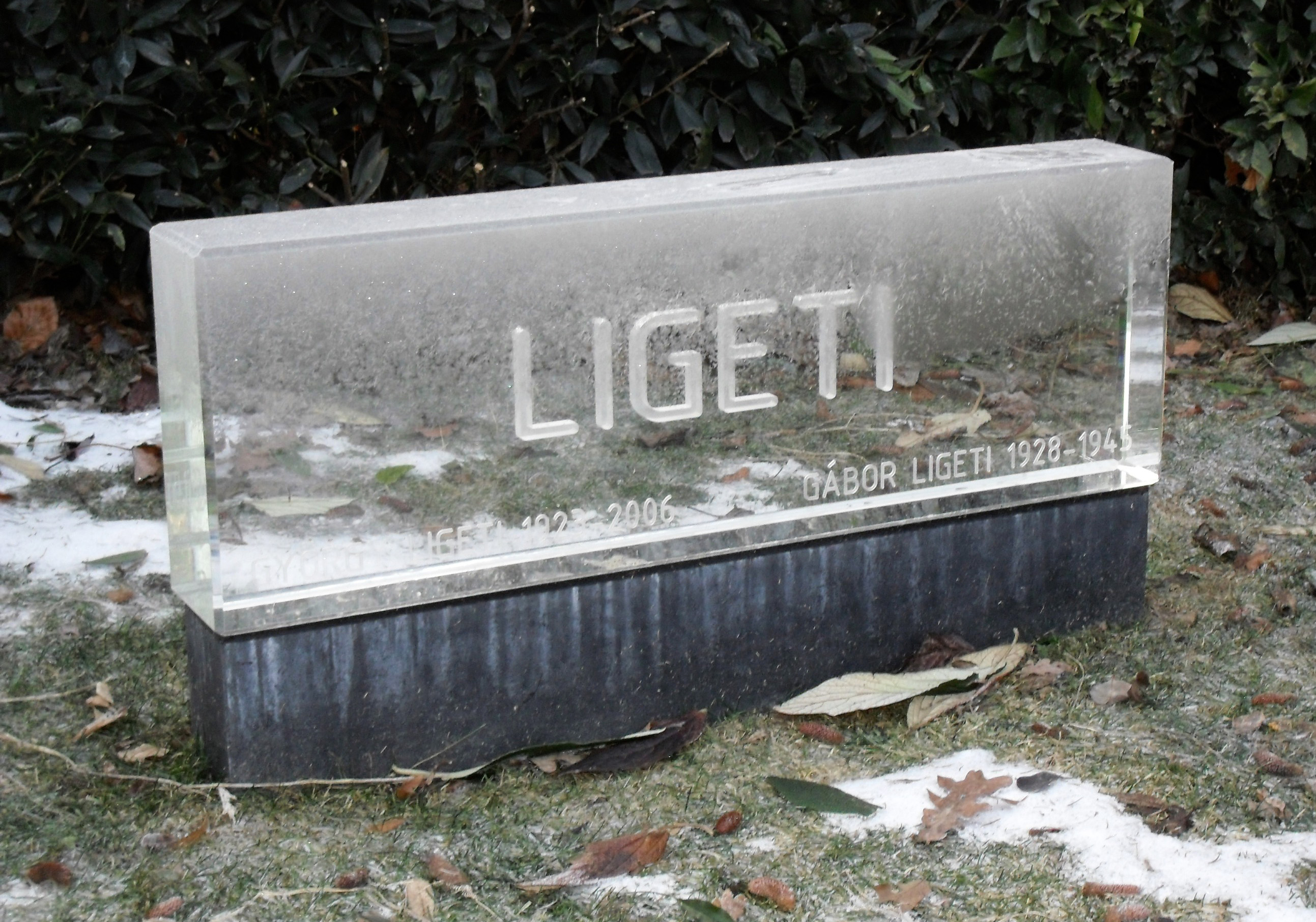
Ligeti's grave in Vienna Central Cemetery

Ligeti's health deteriorated after the turn of the millennium; he died in Vienna on 12 June 2006, at the age of 83. Although it was known that he had been ill for several years and had used a wheelchair for the last three years of his life, his family declined to release details of the cause of his death.

Austrian Chancellor Wolfgang Schüssel and Art Secretary Franz Morak both paid tribute to Ligeti. His funeral was held at Feuerhalle Simmering. The memorial concert was performed by Pierre-Laurent Aimard and the Arnold Schoenberg Choir. His ashes were buried at Vienna Central Cemetery in a grave of honor (German: Ehrengrab).

He was survived by his wife Vera and son Lukas. The latter is a composer and percussionist based in the United States.

== Music ==
=== Compositions in Hungary ===
Many of Ligeti's earliest works were written for chorus and included settings of folk songs. His largest work in this period was a graduation composition for the Budapest Academy, entitled Cantata for Youth Festival, for four vocal soloists, chorus and orchestra. One of his earliest pieces now in the repertoire is his Cello Sonata, a work in two contrasting movements that were written in 1948 and 1953. It was initially banned by the Soviet-run Composer's Union and was not performed publicly for a quarter of a century.

Ligeti's earliest works are often an extension of the musical language of Béla Bartók. Even his piano cycle Musica ricercata (1953), though written according to Ligeti with a "Cartesian" approach, in which he "regarded all the music I knew and loved as being... irrelevant", the piece has been described by one biographer as from a world very close to Bartók's set of piano works, Mikrokosmos. Ligeti's set comprises eleven pieces in all. The work is based on a simple restriction: the first piece uses exclusively one pitch A, heard in multiple octaves, and only at the very end of the piece is a second note, D, heard. The second piece uses three notes (E♯, F♯, and G), the third piece uses four, and so on, so that in the final piece all twelve notes of the chromatic scale are present.

Shortly after its composition, Ligeti arranged six of the movements of Musica ricercata for wind quintet under the title 'Six Bagatelles for Wind Quintet'. The Bagatelles were performed first in 1956, but not in their entirety: the last movement was censored by the Soviets for being too 'dangerous'.

Because of Soviet censorship, his most daring works from this period, including Musica ricercata and his String Quartet No. 1 Métamorphoses nocturnes (1953–1954), were written for the 'bottom drawer'. Composed of a single movement divided into seventeen contrasting sections linked motivically, the First String Quartet is Ligeti's first work to suggest a personal style of composition. The string quartet was not performed until 1958, after he had fled Hungary for Vienna.

=== From 1956 to Le Grand Macabre ===
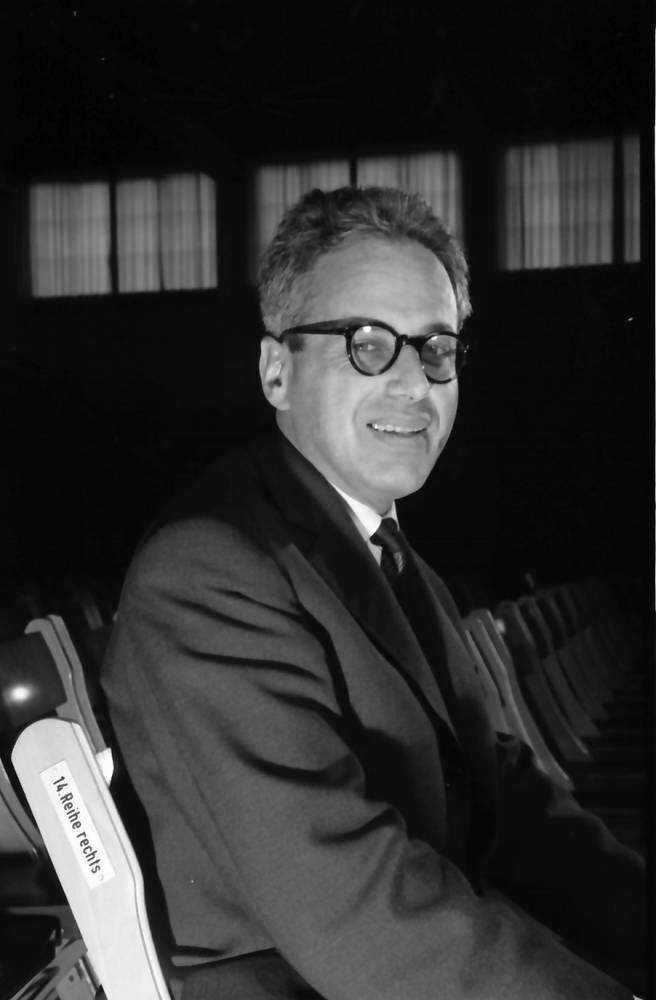
Photo of Ligeti by Willy Pragher, 1961

Upon arriving in Cologne, Ligeti began to write electronic music alongside Karlheinz Stockhausen and Gottfried Michael Koenig at the electronic studio of West German Radio (WDR). He completed only two works in this medium, however—the pieces Glissandi (1957) and Artikulation (1958)—before returning to instrumental music. A third work, originally entitled Atmosphères but later known as Pièce électronique Nr. 3, was planned, but the technical limitations of the time prevented Ligeti from realizing it completely. It was finally realised in 1996 by the Dutch composers Kees Tazelaar and Johan van Kreij of the Institute of Sonology.

Ligeti's music appears to have been subsequently influenced by his electronic experiments, and many of the sounds he created resembled electronic textures. Ligeti coined the term "micropolyphony" to describe the texture of the second movement of Apparitions (1958–59) and Atmosphères (1961). This texture is a similar to that of polyphony, except that the polyphony is obscured in a dense and rich stack of pitches. Micropolyphony can be used to create the nearly static but slowly evolving works such as Atmosphères in which the individual instruments become hidden in a complex web of sound. According to Ligeti, after Apparitions and Atmosphères, he "became famous".

With Volumina (1961–62, revised 1966) for solo organ, Ligeti continued with clusters of notes, translated into blocks of sound. In this piece, Ligeti abandoned conventional music notation, instead using diagrams to represent general pitch areas, duration, and flurries of notes.

Poème symphonique (1962) is a work for one hundred mechanical metronomes during his brief acquaintance with Fluxus movement.

Aventures (1962), like its companion piece Nouvelles Aventures (1962–65), is a composition for three singers and instrumental septet, to a text (of Ligeti's own devising) that is without semantic meaning. In these pieces, each singer has five roles to play, exploring five areas of emotion, and they switch from one to the other so quickly and abruptly that all five areas are present throughout the piece.

Requiem (1963–65) is a work for soprano and mezzo-soprano soloists, twenty-part chorus (four each of soprano, mezzo-soprano, alto, tenor, and bass), and orchestra. Though, at about half an hour, it is the longest piece he had composed up to that point, Ligeti sets only about half of the Requiem's traditional text: the "Introitus", the "Kyrie" (a completely chromatic quasi-fugue, where the parts are a montage of melismatic, skipping micropolyphony), and the "Dies irae"—dividing the latter sequence into two parts, "De die judicii" and "Lacrimosa".

Lux Aeterna (1966) is a 16-voice a cappella piece whose text is also associated with the Latin Requiem.

Ligeti's Cello Concerto (1966), which is dedicated to Siegfried Palm, is composed of two movements: the first begins with an almost imperceptible cello which slowly shifts into static tone clusters with the orchestra before reaching a crescendo and slowly decaying, while the second is a virtuoso piece of dynamic atonal melody on the part of the cello.

Lontano (1967), for full orchestra, is another example of micropolyphony, but the overall effect is closer to harmony, with complex woven textures and opacity of the sound giving rise to a harmonious effect. It has become a standard repertoire piece.

String Quartet No. 2 (1968) consists of five movements. They differ widely from each other in their types of motion. In the first, the structure is largely broken up, as in Aventures. In the second, everything is reduced to very slow motion, and the music seems to be coming from a distance, with great lyricism. The pizzicato third movement is a machine-like studies, hard and mechanical, whereby the parts playing repeated notes create a "granulated" continuum. In the fourth, which is fast and threatening, everything that happened before is crammed together. Lastly, in strong contrast, the fifth movement spreads itself out. In each movement, the same basic configurations return, but each time their colouring or viewpoint is different, so that the overall form only really emerges when one listens to all five movements in context.

Ramifications (1968–69), completed a year before the Chamber Concerto, is scored for an ensemble of strings in twelve parts—seven violins, two violas, two cellos and a double bass—each of which may be taken by one player or several. The twelve are divided into two numerically equal groups but with the instruments in the first group tuned approximately a quarter-tone higher (four violins, a viola and a cello). As the group play, the one tuned higher inevitably tends to slide down toward the other, and both get nearer each other in pitch.

In the Chamber Concerto (1969–70), several layers, processes and kinds of movement can take place on different planes simultaneously. In spite of frequent markings of "senza tempo", the instrumentalists are not given linear freedom; Ligeti insists on keeping his texture under strict control at any given moment. The form is like a "precision mechanism". Ligeti was always fascinated by machines that do not work properly and by the world of technology and automation. The use of periodic mechanical noises, suggesting not-quite-reliable machinery, occurs in many of his works. The scoring is for flute (doubling piccolo), oboe (doubling oboe d'amore and cor anglais), clarinet, bass clarinet (doubling second clarinet), horn, trombone, harpsichord (doubling Hammond organ), piano (doubling celesta), and solo string quintet. He also wrote a Double Concerto for Flute, Oboe & Orchestra (1972).

Most of these compositions establish timbre, rather than the traditionally-favored dimensions of pitch and rhythm, as their principal formal parameter, a practice that has come to be known as sonorism. From the 1970s, Ligeti turned away from sonorism and began to concentrate on rhythm. Pieces such as Continuum (1968) and Clocks and Clouds (1972–73) were written before he heard the music of Steve Reich and Terry Riley in 1972. But the second of his Three Pieces for Two Pianos (1976), entitled "Self-portrait with Reich and Riley (and Chopin in the background)", commemorates this affirmation and influence. During the 1970s, he also became interested in the polyphonic pipe music of the Banda-Linda tribe from the Central African Republic, which he heard through the recordings of one of his students.

In 1977, Ligeti completed his only opera, Le Grand Macabre, thirteen years after its initial commission. Loosely based on Michel de Ghelderode's 1934 play, La balade du grand macabre, it is a work of Absurd theatre—Ligeti called it an "anti-anti-opera"—in which Death (Nekrotzar) arrives in the fictional city of Breughelland and announces that the end of the world will occur at midnight. Musically, Le Grand Macabre draws on techniques not associated with Ligeti's previous work, including quotations and pseudo-quotations of other works and the use of consonant thirds and sixths. After Le Grand Macabre, Ligeti would abandon the use of pastiche, but would increasingly incorporate consonant harmonies (even major and minor triads) into his work, albeit not in a diatonic context.

=== After Le Grand Macabre ===
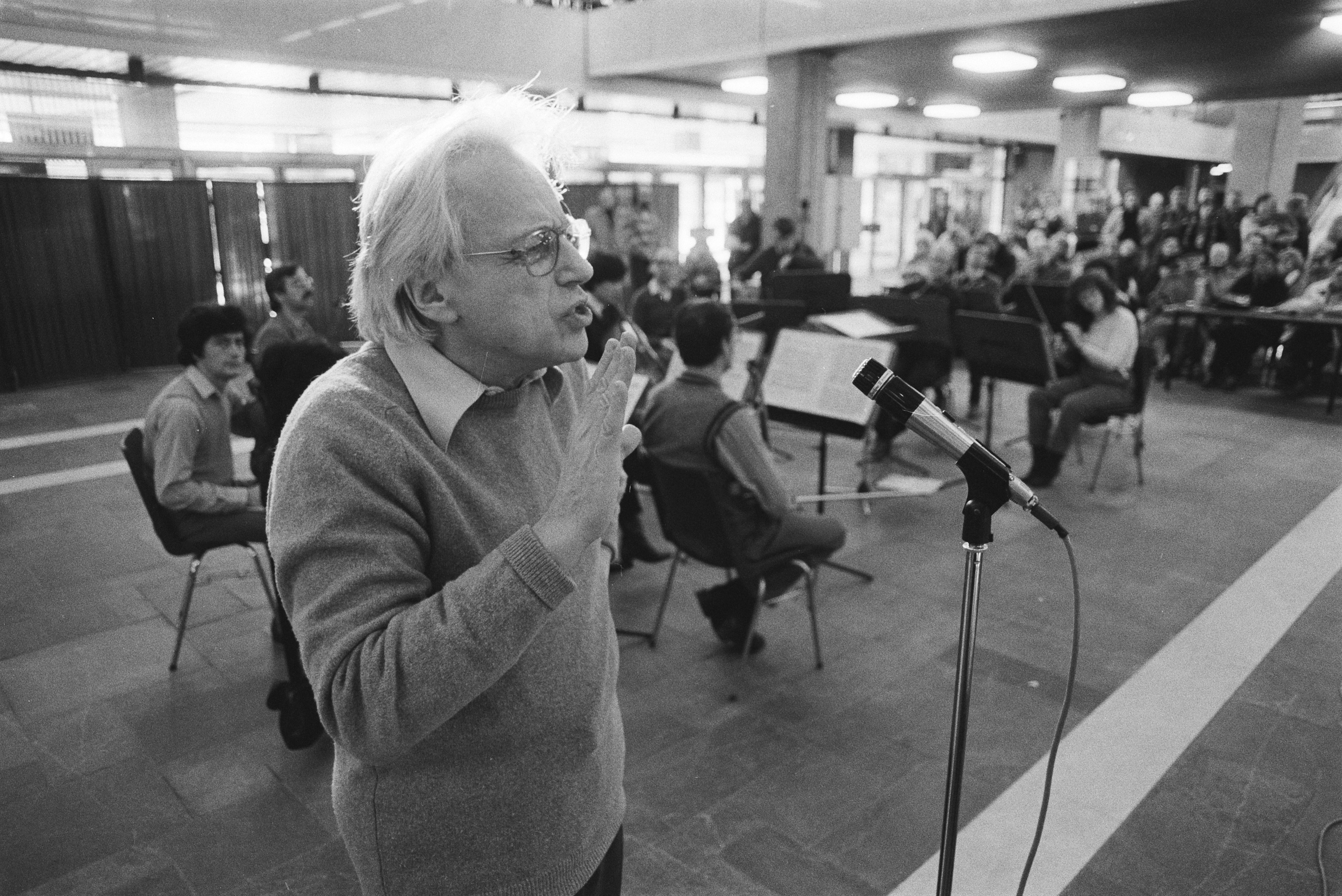
Ligeti (1 February 1984)

After Le Grand Macabre, Ligeti struggled for some time to find a new style. Besides two short pieces for harpsichord, he did not complete another major work until the Trio for Violin, Horn and Piano in 1982, over four years after the opera. His music of the 1980s and 1990s continued to emphasise complex mechanical rhythms, often in a less densely chromatic idiom, tending to favour displaced major and minor triads and polymodal structures. During this time, Ligeti also began to explore alternate tuning systems through the use of natural harmonics for horns (as in the Horn Trio and Piano Concerto) and scordatura for strings (as in the Violin Concerto). Additionally, most of his works in this period are multi-movement works, rather than the extended single movements of Atmosphères and San Francisco Polyphony.

From 1985 to 2001, Ligeti completed three books of Études for piano (Book I, 1985; Book II, 1988–94; Book III, 1995–2001). Comprising eighteen compositions in all, the Études draw from a diverse range of sources, including gamelan, African polyrhythms, Béla Bartók, Conlon Nancarrow, Thelonious Monk, and Bill Evans. Book I was written as preparation for the Piano Concerto, which contains a number of similar motivic and melodic elements. Ligeti's music from the last two decades of his life is unmistakable for its rhythmic complexity. Writing about his first book of Piano Études, the composer claims this rhythmic complexity stems from two vastly different sources of inspiration: the Romantic-era piano music of Chopin and Schumann and the indigenous music of sub-Saharan Africa.

The difference between the earlier and later pieces lies in a new conception of pulse. In the earlier works, the pulse is something to be divided into two, three and so on. The effect of these different subdivisions, especially when they occur simultaneously, is to blur the aural landscape, creating the micropolyphonic effect of Ligeti's music.

On the other hand, the later music—and a few earlier pieces such as Continuum—treats the pulse as a musical atom, a common denominator, a basic unit, which cannot be divided further. Different rhythms appear through multiplications of the basic pulse, rather than divisions: this is the principle of African music seized on by Ligeti. It also appears in the music of Philip Glass, Steve Reich and others; and significantly it shares much in common with the additive rhythms of Balkan folk music, the music of Ligeti's youth. He described the music of Conlon Nancarrow, with its extremely complex explorations of polyrhythmic complexity, as "the greatest discovery since Webern and Ives... something great and important for all music history! His music is so utterly original, enjoyable, perfectly constructed, but at the same time emotional... for me it's the best music of any composer living today."

In 1988, Ligeti completed his Piano Concerto, writing that "I present my artistic credo in the Piano Concerto: I demonstrate my independence from criteria of the traditional avantgarde, as well as the fashionable postmodernism." Initial sketches of the Concerto began in 1980, but it was not until 1985 that he found a way forward and the work proceeded more quickly. The Concerto explores many of the ideas worked out in the Études but in an orchestral context.

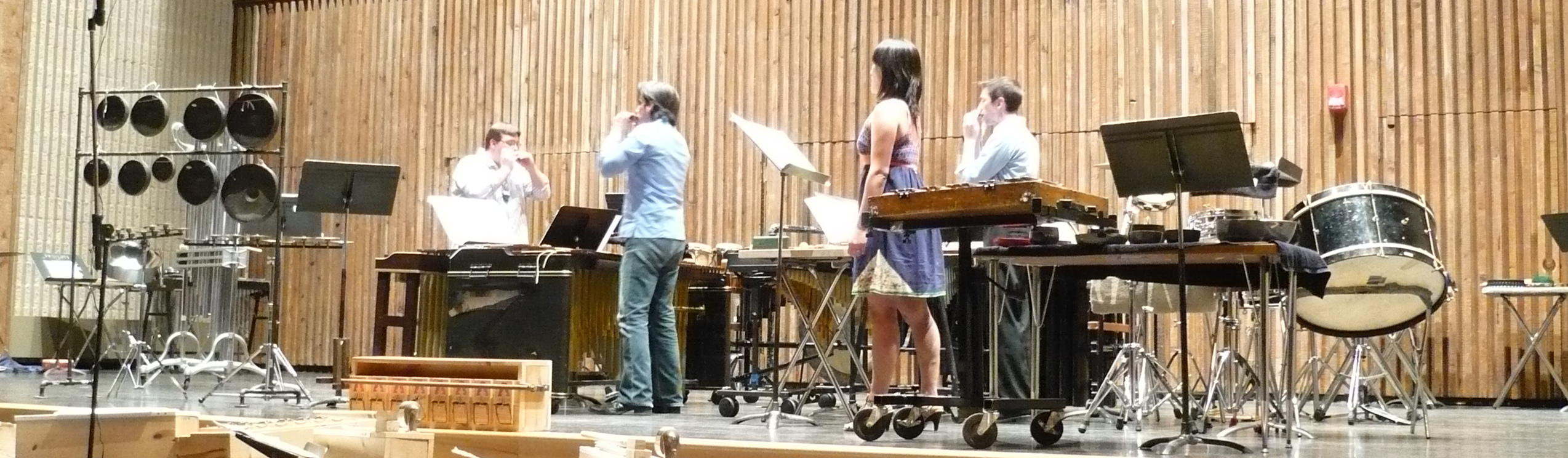
Performance of Síppal, dobbal, nádihegedűvel by the Akros Percussion Collective with Nina Eidsheim, soprano at the University of Akron. In this section of the piece, the percussionists play chromatic harmonicas (3 May 2009)

In 1993, Ligeti completed his Violin Concerto after four years of work. Like the Piano Concerto, the Violin Concerto uses the wide range of techniques he had developed up until that point as well as the new ideas he was working out at the moment. Among other techniques, it uses a passacaglia, "microtonality, rapidly changing textures, comic juxtapositions... Hungarian folk melodies, Bulgarian dance rhythms, references to Medieval and Renaissance music and solo violin writing that ranges from the slow-paced and sweet-toned to the angular and fiery."

Other notable works from this period are the Viola Sonata (1994) and the Nonsense Madrigals (1988–93), a set of six a cappella compositions that set English texts from William Brighty Rands, Lewis Carroll, and Heinrich Hoffman. The third Madrigal is a setting of the English alphabet.

Ligeti's last works were the Hamburg Concerto for solo horn, four natural horns and chamber orchestra (1998–99, revised 2003, dedicated to Marie-Luise Neunecker), the song cycle Síppal, dobbal, nádihegedűvel ("With Pipes, Drums, Fiddles", 2000), and the eighteenth piano étude "Canon" (2001). The printed score and the manuscript of the Hamburg Concerto contain numerous errors and inconsistencies. The revision of the piece, realized by the Italian composer Alessio Elia and published in the book The Hamburgisches Konzert by György Ligeti, published by Edition Impronta, was used for the first revised performance of this work, realized by the Concerto Budapest Ligeti Ensemble with Szabolcs Zempléni as solo horn. The orchestra should have been conducted by Peter Eötvös, replaced due to indisposition by Gergely Vajda. Additionally, after Le Grand Macabre, Ligeti planned to write a second opera, first to be based on Shakespeare's The Tempest and later on Carroll's Alice's Adventures in Wonderland, but neither came to fruition.

== Legacy ==
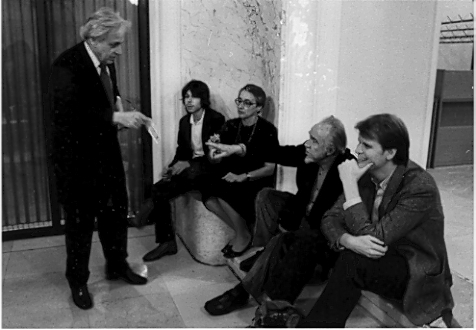
From left to right: György Ligeti, Lukas Ligeti, Vera Ligeti, Conlon Nancarrow, and Michael Daugherty at the ISCM World Music Days in Graz, Austria, 1982

Ligeti has been described as "together with Boulez, Berio, Stockhausen, and Cage as one of the most innovative and influential among progressive figures of his time". From about 1960, Ligeti's work became better known and respected. His best-known work was written during the period from Apparitions to Lontano, which includes Atmosphères, Volumina, Aventures and Nouvelles Aventures, Requiem, Lux Aeterna, and his Cello Concerto; as well as his opera Le Grand Macabre. In recent years, his three books of piano études have also become well known and are the subject of the Inside the Score project of pianist Pierre-Laurent Aimard.

=== Music in the films of Stanley Kubrick ===
Ligeti's music is best known to the public not acquainted with 20th century classical music for its use in three films of Stanley Kubrick's, which gained him a world-wide audience. The soundtrack of 2001: A Space Odyssey includes excerpts from four of his pieces: Atmosphères, Lux Aeterna, Requiem and Aventures. Atmosphères is heard during the "Star Gate" sequence, with portions also heard in the Overture and Intermission. Lux Aeterna is heard in the moon-bus scene en route to the Tycho monolith. The Kyrie sequence of his Requiem is heard over the first three monolith encounters. An electronically altered version of Aventures, unlisted in the film credits, is heard in the cryptic final scenes. The music was used, and in some cases modified, without Ligeti's knowledge, and without full copyright clearance. When he learned about the use of his music in the film, he "successfully sued for having had his music distorted" and they settled out of court. Kubrick sought permission and compensated Ligeti for use of his music in later films.

Lux Aeterna was used again in Peter Hyams's 1984 sequel of 2001, 2010: The Year We Make Contact .

A later Kubrick film, The Shining, uses small portions of Lontano for orchestra.

One motif from the second movement of Ligeti's Musica ricercata is used at pivotal moments in Kubrick's Eyes Wide Shut. At the German premiere of that film, by which time Kubrick had died, his widow was escorted by Ligeti himself.

=== Music in other films and media ===
Ligeti's work has also been used in numerous films by other directors. Lontano was also used in Martin Scorsese's 2010 psychological thriller film Shutter Island. The first movement of the Cello Concerto was used in the Michael Mann 1995 crime film Heat. The Requiem was used in the 2014 film Godzilla. The Cello Concerto and the Piano Concerto were used in Yorgos Lanthimos' 2017 film The Killing of a Sacred Deer.

His music has also been used in television and radio. Lontano, Atmosphères, and the first movement of the Cello Concerto were used in Sophie Fiennes's documentary Over Your Cities Grass Will Grow, about the German post-war artist Anselm Kiefer. Lontano, Melodien, and Volumina were used in Fit the First, Fit the Fifth, and Fit the Sixth of the radio series of The Hitchhiker's Guide to the Galaxy as background music to sections of narrative from the Guide.

== Awards ==
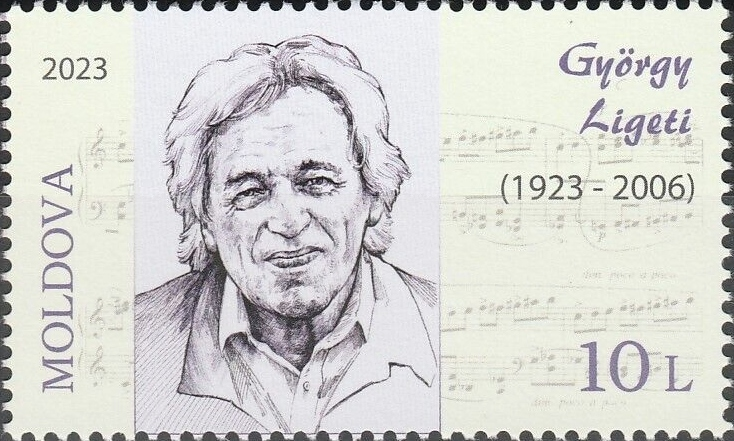
Ligeti on a 2023 stamp of Moldova

- Beethoven Prize of Bonn for Requiem (1967)
- UNESCO International Rostrum of Composers (1969)
- Berlin Art Prize (1972)
- Bach Prize of the Free and Hanseatic City of Hamburg (1975)
- Pour le Mérite for Sciences and Arts (1975)
- University of Louisville Grawemeyer Award for Music Composition (Études for Piano) (1986)
- Austrian Decoration for Science and Art (1987)
- Honorary Ring of the Vienna (1987)
- Commandeur dans l'Ordre des Arts et des Lettres (1988)
- Prix de composition musicale de la Fondation Prince Pierre de Monaco (1988)
- Léonie Sonning Music Prize (Denmark, 1990)
- Grand Austrian State Prize for Music (1990)
- Praemium Imperiale (1991)
- Balzan Prize (1991)
- Honorary Member of the Royal Academy of Music, London (1992)
- Ernst von Siemens Music Prize, Germany (1993)
- Rolf Schock Prize for Musical Arts (1995)
- Music Award of the UNESCO (1996)
- Wolf Prize in Arts, Israel (1996)
- Wihuri Sibelius Prize, Finland (2000)
- Kyoto Prize (2001)
- Medal of Arts and Sciences of the City of Hamburg (2003)
- Theodor W. Adorno Award (2003)
- Kossuth Prize, Hungary (2003)
- Polar Music Prize (2004)
- Frankfurter Musikpreis (2005)

=== Honorary doctorates ===
- Honorary doctor from the Universität Hamburg (1988)

== Writings ==
- Ligeti, György (1957). "Zur III. Klaviersonate von Boulez". Die Reihe. 5: "Berichte—Analyse": 38–40. English as "Some Remarks on Boulez' 3rd Piano Sonata", translated by Leo Black. Die Reihe [English edition] 5: "Reports—Analyses" (1961): 56–58.
- — (1958). "Pierre Boulez. Entscheidung und Automatik in der Structure 1a". Die Reihe. 4: "Junge Komponisten": 38–63. English as "Pierre Boulez: Decision and Automaticism in Structure 1a", translated by Leo Black. Die Reihe [English edition] 4: "Young Composers" (1960): 36–62.
- — (1960). "Wandlungen der musikalischen Form". Die Reihe. 7: "Form—Raum": 5–17.. English as "Metamorphoses of Musical Form", translated by Cornelius Cardew. Die Reihe [English edition] 7 "Form—Space" (1964): 5–19.
- — (1960). "Zustände, Ereignisse, Wandlungen: Bemerkungen zu meinem Orchesterstück Apparitions". Bilder und Blätter 11. Reprinted as "Zustände, Ereignisse, Wandlungen". Melos 34 (1967): 165–169. English as "States, Events, Transformations", translated by Jonathan W. Bernard. Perspectives of New Music 31, no. 1 (Winter 1993): 164–171.
- — (1978). "On Music and Politics", translated by Wes Blomster. Perspectives of New Music 16, no. 2 (Spring–Summer): 19–24. Originally published in German, in the Darmstädter Beiträge zur Neuen Musik 13 (1973): 42–46.
- — (1987). "A Viennese Exponent of Understatement: Personal Reflections on Friedrich Cerha", translated by Inge Goodwin. Tempo, New Series, no. 161/162: "...An Austrian Quodlibet..." (June–September): 3–5.
- — (1988). "On My Piano Concerto", translated by Robert Cogan. Sonus: A Journal of Investigations into Global Musical Possibilities 9, no. 1 (Fall): 8–13.
- with Peter Sellars (Winter 1959). "Le Grand Macabre: An Opera in Two Acts (Four Scenes) 1974–1977". Grand Street. No. 59: "Time". pp. 206–214.
- — (2001). Neuf essais sur la musique, translated by Catherine Fourcassié. Geneva: Contrechamps.
