= István Tótfalusi =

Hungarian writer, literary translator, linguist, and editor (1936–2020)

- Born: December 8, 1936; Budapest
- Died: August 29, 2020 (aged 83)
- Occupations: writer, literary translator, linguist, and editor

István Tótfalusi, born István Tóth, bearing this name until 1960 (Budapest, December 8, 1936 – August 29, 2020) was a Hungarian writer, literary translator, linguist, editor, and a recipient of the Attila József Prize (1997).

== Career and work ==
Between 1955 and 1959 he was a student of Hungarian and English at the School of English and American Studies of the Faculty of Humanities of the Eötvös Loránd University (ELTE BTK). Between 1959 and 1980 and from 1984 to 1996 he was editor-in-charge of the Móra Ferenc Book Publishing House, and between 1981 and 1983, the editor of Interpress Magazine.

He translated poetry, novels, and plays into Hungarian from English, German, Swedish, Norwegian, French, Italian, Spanish, Portuguese, and Latin. He translated into English several poems by Mihály Babits (1988), Milán Füst (1990), János Pilinszky, Gyula Illyés (1995), Péter Kuczka (1996), Ágnes Gergely (1997), Sándor Kányádi (1999), Sándor Weöres (2004), and Lőrinc Szabó (2006) as well as an anthology of contemporary Hungarian poetry (1997).

== Private life ==
In 1959 he married Éva Koncz. They had three children, András (1960), Ágnes (1963) and Gábor (1964).

He had five grandchildren, Vera (1993), Hanna (1989), Péter (1998), Anna (2000) and Gergő (2002).

== Works ==
- Árkádiában éltem én is. Csokonai élete ("I lived in Arcadia too. The Life of Csokonai") Móra, Budapest, 1966
- Shelley világa ("The World of Shelley") Európa, Budapest, 1971
- Bábel örökében ("Babel’s Legacy"), linguistic popular education, 1972
- Operamesék ("Opera Tales"), Zeneműkiadó, Budapest, 1973
- Byron világa ("Byron’s World") (small monograph), 1975
- Barátod, a zebra ("Your Friend, the Zebra"), illustrated by István Hegedüs, Móra, Budapest, 1978
- Svédország közel van ("Sweden is Close") (youth educational work), 1980
- Vademecum. Szokatlan szavak szótára ("Vademecum. A Dictionary of Unusual Words") Móra, Budapest, 1983
- Vademecum. Szokatlan szavak szótára ("Vademecum. A Dictionary of Unusual Words"), 2nd rev., expanded edition, Móra, Budapest, 1986
- Új operamesék ("New Opera Tales"), Zeneműkiadó, Budapest, 1987
- A forró kutya ("The Hot Dog"), linguistic literature, 1988
- A Könyvek Könyve I. Az Ószövetség. A Bibliából és a Bibliáról ("The Book of Books I. The Old Testament. From and about the Bible"), 1991
- Irodalmi alakok lexikona I. ("Encyclopedia of Literary Figures") vol. I (1992), vol. II (1994)
- Vallási vademecum ("Religious Vademecum") 1992
- Mese, mese, mátka. Mesés kifestő ("Fairy-tale Colouring Book") poem by István Tótfalusi, illustration with drawings by Lívia Elek, Ciceró, Budapest, 1993
- Ki kicsoda az antik mítoszokban? ("Who is Who in the Ancient Myths?") Móra, Budapest, 1993 ISBN 9631170675
- A Könyvek Könyve II. Az Újszövetség ("The Book of Books II. The New Testament"), 1993
- Ki kicsoda Shakespeare világában? ("Who is Who in Shakespeare’s World?"), 1994
- Nyelvi vademecum ("Linguistic Vademecum") 1994
- Ki kicsoda a Bibliában ("Who's Who in the Bible") 1995
- Történelmi vademecum ("Historical Vademecum") 1995
- Barátaink Európában ("Our Friends in Europe") 1996
- Színes szinonimatár ("Colour Thesaurus") 1997
- Magyar nyelvhelyességi kéziszótár A-tól Z-ig ("Hungarian Dictionary of Correct Usage, A to Z") 1997
- Idegen idézetek szótára. Szállóigék, mottók, aforizmák, közmondások görög, latin, angol, francia, német, olasz, spanyol és néhány más nyelven ("Dictionary of Foreign Quotations. A dictionary of Idioms, Mottos, Aphorisms, and Proverbs in Greek, Latin, English, French, German, Italian, Spanish and Some Other Languages") Anno, Budapest, 1998
- Ki kicsoda az antik mítoszokban ("Who is Who in Ancient Myths") expanded edition, Anno, Budapest, 1998
- Kiejtési szótár ("Pronunciation Dictionary"), 1998, 2006
- Irodalmi alakok lexikona ("Dictionary of Literary Figures") expanded edition, Anno, Budapest, 1998
- Kis magyar nyelvklinika ("Little Hungarian Language Clinic") revised, expanded edition, Anno, Budapest, 1999
- Szokatlan szavak szótára ("Dictionary of Unusual Words") 2000
- Idegen szavaink etimológiai szótára ("Etymological Dictionary of our Foreign Words"), 2001
- Magyar szótörténeti szótár ("A Dictionary with the History of Hungarian Words"), 2001
- Idegen szavak magyarul ("Dictionary of Foreign Words in Hungarian"), 2001
- Idegenszó-tár. Idegen szavak értelmező és etimológiai szótára ("Dictionary of Foreign Words. An explanatory and etymological dictionary of foreign words") contribution by Zsuzsanna Windisch, Tinta, Budapest, 2004
- Meseország lakói ("Inhabitants of Fairyland"), General Press, Budapest, 2008
- Halhatatlan hősök ("Immortal Heroes"), General Press, Budapest, 2009
- Klasszikus szócsaládfák. Nyelvünk görög és latin eredetű szavai ("Classic Word-Family Trees. The Greek and Latin Words of our Language"), Tinta, Budapest, 2009
- Magyarító szótár. Idegen szavak magyarul ("Explanatory Dictionary. Dictionary of Foreign Words in Hungarian"), contrib. Gyula Heiszer, Barbara Jójárt, Zsuzsanna Windisch, Tinta, Budapest, 2011
- Irodalmi alakok nagy lexikona I. ("The Unabridged Lexicon of Literary Figures") vol. I, 2010
- Sertések a Bakonyban. Kalandos nyelvtörténet ("Pigs in Bakony Mountain. Adventurous Language History"), Libri, Budapest, 2012
- Idegen szavak alapszótára. 4500 idegen szó magyarázata ("Basic Dictionary of Foreign Words. The Explanations of 4,500 Foreign Words"), Tinta, Budapest, 2015
- 44 tévhit a nyelvekről és nyelvünkről ("44 Misconceptions about Languages and Our Language"), Tinta, Budapest, 2016
- A Nibelung-sztori ("The Nibelung Story") Magvető, Budapest, 2017
- Nyelvészeti ínyencfalatok ("Linguistic Gourmet Snippets"), Tinta, Budapest, 2017
- Vámmentes gondolatok. 838 újkori szállóige 344 neves személytől magyarul és eredeti nyelven, kiejtési tanáccsal ("Duty-free Thoughts. 838 Modern-day Winged Words by 344 Famous People, in Hungarian and in the Original Language, with Pronunciation Advice"), Tinta, Budapest, 2018

== Translations into Hungarian ==
- Aaron Judah: Tales of Teddy Bear, 1964
- Mother Goose Tales, 1966
- B. Mandeville: The Fable of the Bees, 1969
- Hamadani–Hariri, "The Virgin and the Woman" (selection from the Maqama), 1973
- Alan Alexander Milne: Now We Are Six (with Gábor Devecseri and Dezső Tandori), 1973
- S. Fauchereau: Reading American Poetry, 1974
- Britt G. Hallqvist–Ingrid Sjöstrand–Siv Widerberg: "What weighs on your heart," contemporary Swedish children's poems, 1975
- J. R. R. Tolkien. The Hobbit, poem inserts, 1975
- Max Lundgren: "The Boy with the Golden Trousers" (youth novel), 1976
- J. Huizinga: The Autumn of the Middle Ages: A study of the forms of life, thought and art in France and the Netherlands in the fourteenth and fifteenth centuries (with Antal Szerb and István Vas), 1976
- T. Å. Bringsværd: Jørgen Moes vei nr 13, 1977
- Sven Delblanc: "The Castrated," [1977]
- Harry Martinson: Flowering Nettle (with László Lontay), 1977
- Karin Boye: Kallocain (science-fiction novel), 1978
- H. Peterson: Pelle in trouble, 1978
- Lord Byron: Letters and journals (with István Bart and László Gy. Horváth), 1978
- Stig Claesson: "Hilmer Johansson raises his voice", 1979
- Robert Graves: Good-Bye to All That (with Tibor Szilágyi), autobiographical novel, 1979
- R. Nieto: "The Young Lady" (with Zsuzsanna Tomcsányi), novel, 1979
- Lewis Carroll: Through the Looking-Glass (with Tamás Révbíró), Bratislava–Budapest, 1980
- Miroslav Válek: "The enchanted walnut grinder" (with Ákos Tordon), Budapest–Bratislava, 1980
- G. Arciniegas: The Knight of El Dorado (with Zsuzsa Tomcsányi), 1980
- E. Schwartz: "Enchanted Brothers". Fairy tale play in three acts (with Endre Bojtár), [1980]
- L. Villalonga: Bearn o La sala de las muñecas (with Zsuzsa Tomcsányi), novel, 1982
- Peter Pan (fairy tale novel based on Barrie's work), 1983
- A. E. Housman: a selection of his poems, 1984
- M. Brett: The Moors: Islam in the West (with Tamás Zala), 1985
- Jack London: Before Adam (with Imre Szász), novellas, 1985
- Astrid Lindgren: Ronia, the Robber's Daughter, youth novel, 1986
- Knut Ødegård, poems, selected and translated, 1986
- I. Edelfeldt: "Robin and the invisible ones", fairy tale novel, 1987
- S. Claesson: "Karin, the evil fairy," fairy tale, 1987
- L. Frick: "No more excuses," novel, 1988
- Arthur Conan Doyle: The Poison Belt, 1989
- Aaron Judah: Old and New Tales of Teddy Bear. 1990
- Kurt Vonnegut: Mother Night (with András Békés), novel, 1993
- Vittorio Alfieri: Tragedies, 1994
- Kurt Vonnegut: Fates Worse Than Death, biographical notes from the 1980s (with György Tibor Szántó), 1995
- Astrid Lindgren: Pippi Longstocking, 1997
- Astrid Lindgren: "New pranks of Emil of Lönneberga", 1997
- P. Jekel: The Third Jungle Book, 1997
- Vladimir Nabokov: Pale Fire, 2008
- Anthony Burgess: Nothing Like the Sun, 2011

== Translations into English ==
- Mihály Babits
  - Jónás könyve – The Book of Jonah, 2004. review
  - An Evening Question
  - Between autumn and spring
  - Dániel’s Song
  - For long have Sappho’s days been silent now…
  - The Danaids
  - The Epilogue of the Lyric Poet
  - The mice of Babylon
  - 21 vers – 21 Poems (Maecenas Kiadó)
- Milán Füst: 25 vers – 25 Poems (Maecenas Kiadó)
- Gyula Illyés: 29 vers – 29 Poems (Maecenas Kiadó)
- Sándor Kányádi: 45 vers – 45 Poems (Maecenas Kiadó)
- János Pilinszky: 66 vers – 66 Poems (Maecenas Kiadó)
- Lőrinc Szabó: 35 vers – 35 Poems (Maecenas Kiadó)
- Sándor Weöres: 62 vers – 62 Poems (Maecenas Kiadó)

== Awards and honours ==
- Children's Book of the Year (1983, 1991, 1993, 1998, 2005)
- Europe Publishers’ Choice Award (1984, 1986, 1991)
- Literary Prize of the Art Fund (1990)
- Book of the Year Award (1993)
- Swedish Literary Fund Prize (1995)
- Gold Cross of Merit of the Republic of Hungary (1996)
- Attila József Prize (1997)
- Tokaj Writers’ Camp Award (1997)
- Milán Füst Award (2014)
- László Wessely Prize (2015)

== Sources ==
- (in Hungarian) Ki kicsoda a magyar irodalomban? ("Who is Who in Hungarian Literature?) Tárogató Books, ISBN 9638607106
- (in Hungarian) MTI Ki kicsoda 2009. ("Who’s Who 2009"). Ed. Péter Hermann. Budapest: Hungarian News Agency, 2008. ISBN 9789631787283
