= György Aczél =

Hungarian politician

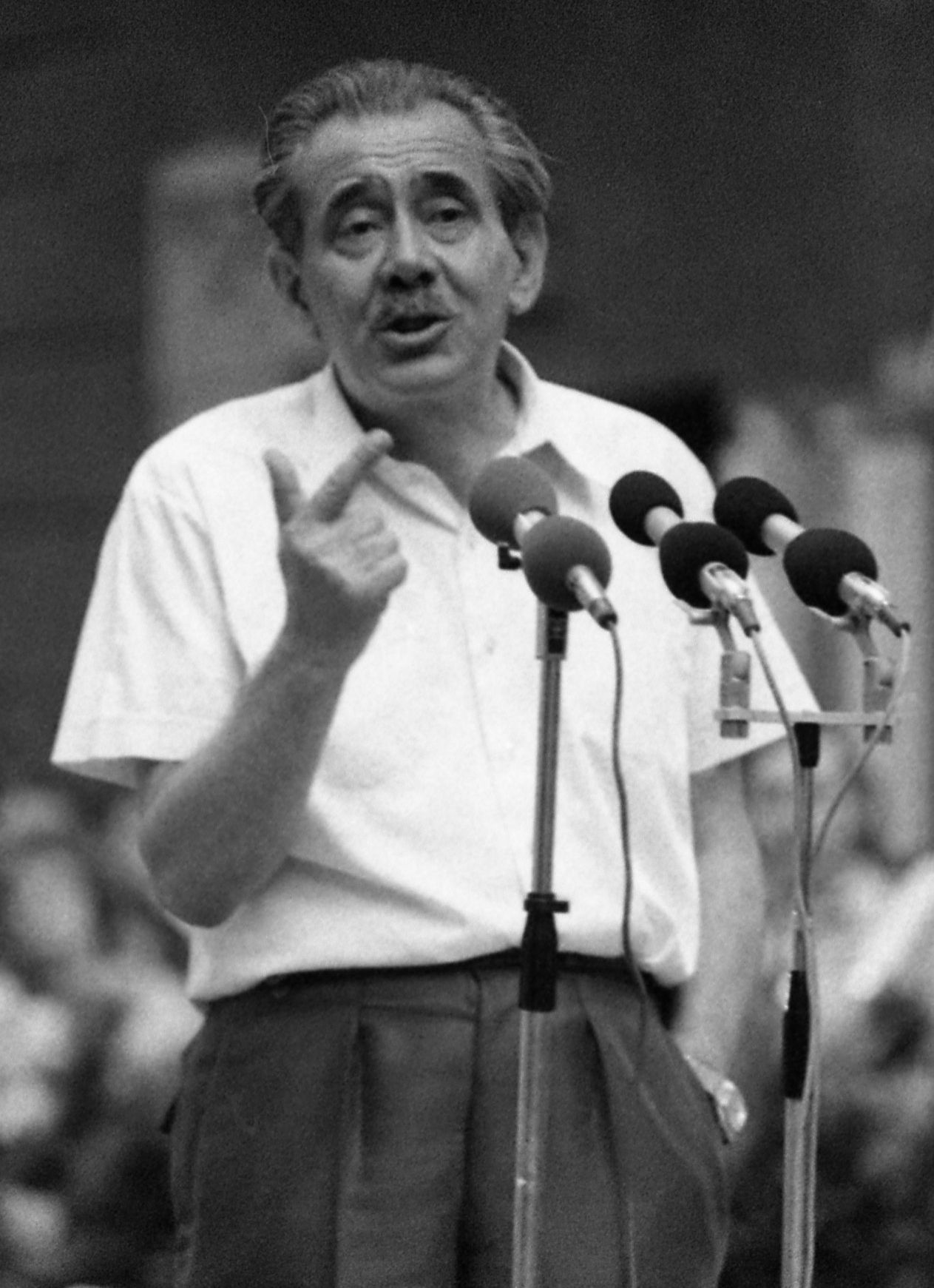
- György Aczél in 1978

First Deputy Minister of Culture
- In office 10 February 1958 – 18 April 1967

Personal details
- Born: 31 August 1917 Budapest, Austria-Hungary
- Died: 6 December 1991 (aged 74) Vienna, Austria
- Party: MKP (1935–1948); MDP (1948–56); MSZMP (1956–89)
- Profession: politician

György Aczél (born Henrik Appel; 31 August 1917 – 6 December 1991) was a Hungarian communist politician. He became a member of the then illegal Hungarian Communist Party in 1935, and was a founding member of the Political Committee (Hu: Politikai Bizottság) of the Hungarian Socialist Workers' Party in 1956. He was a deputy minister from 1958 to 1967, later, as one of the leaders of the Party's Central Committee (Hu: Központi Bizottság) the most influential figure in socialist culture politics.

== Biography ==
=== Early life and career ===
He was born as Henrik Appel into a poor Jewish family in Budapest. His father, Gyula Appel was a coachman and a butcher's assistant, his mother, Aranka Weimann was a typist. After his father's death in 1925 who froze to death in a slaughterhouse he was brought up in an orphanage where he also carried out his studies. Later he became a bricklayer's assistant. He changed his family name in 1936 and his first name about at the end of the 1930s, but only in 1946 and in 1955 he officially became Aczél and György, respectively.

He was married in 1939 and two daughters were born from his marriage. He mostly educated himself in an autodidact way, furthermore, he completed the autumn semester at the Academy of Drama and Film besides his work. He started to work as an amateur actor and as a performer. In the beginning, he acted in the company stagione of Nándor Alapi, he performed in several minor roles in Budapest, but he also played in Győr, Pécs and Balassagyarmat. On 24 December 1938, he held an independent performance at the Liszt Academy. In January 1939 he had his own declamation of poems of Endre Ady, Ferenc Kölcsey, Gyula Illyés, Mihály Babits, Dezső Kosztolányi and Lőrinc Szabó. The upcoming anti-Jewish laws blocked him from stage. Between 1942 and 1944 he performed on several occasions in the Goldmark Hall of the Liszt Academy. In the framework of the OMIKE Art Exhibition, and was often featured in the workshops of the workers' organised meetings.

At the beginning of the 1930s he joined the Hashomer Hatzair youth movement, and in 1935 he joined the then illegal Communist Party. At the beginning of 1942 he was arrested for illegal communist activities and locked in the prison of Vác. At the end of 1942 he was summoned to labor service where he managed to disassemble himself and return to Budapest. During the German occupation of Hungary and the Arrow Cross Party's seizure of power in 1944, he was baptized as a Roman Catholic for the sake of the Jews who were being hidden by him or through him.

Following the Soviet Occupation of Hungary in 1945, he was first a member of the re-forming communist party's Budapest Party Committee (Hu: Budapesti Pártbizottság), later he joined its organisation in the 5th district (Hu: V. Kerületi Pártbizottság), and from August 1946 he worked in its Zemplén county office. In the 1947 "blue-ballot" election he was elected to the Parliament. He was re-elected in the May 1949 elections, but only two months later, on 6 July, he was arrested and sentenced to a life imprisonment in one of the show trials of László Rajk. He was released on 25 August 1954, and rehabilitated on 1 September. On 1 November, he was appointed director of the Nr. 23 State Construction Company, but he could not get a political position.

=== Director of cultural policy ===
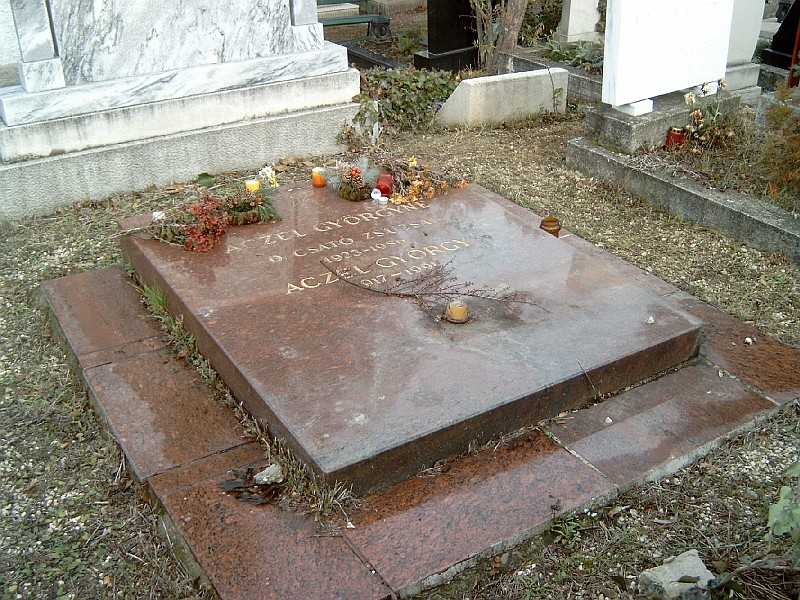
György Aczél grave

During the Hungarian Revolution of 1956, he participated in the armoured defense of the party's headquarters in the 5th district. ion, he immediately joined János Kádár's new regime, and on 31 October, he became the founding member of the Hungarian Socialist Workers' Party (MSZMP) and he was elected a member of its Central Committee (Hu: Központi Bizottság). In the judgment of the revolution and the role of Imre Nagy, he represented the party's "softer" line.

After the Soviet troops crushed the revolt, on 13 April 1957, he was appointed Deputy Minister of Culture. He served as First Deputy Minister of Culture from 10 February 1958 until 18 April 1967. In this position, he gradually grew up (especially under Pál Ilku's ministership) as a leading cultural politician of the Kádár regime. As a result, Ilku was sarcastically named as the First Superior Minister of Culture, as Aczél functioned as the de facto head of the ministry. In a letter to the political committee in the summer of 1957, he raised the notorious "three Ts". The three T letters are an abbreviation of the Hungarian words for tiltott, tűrt, támogatott (En: prohibited, tolerated, supported). This attitude became a real, common practice only in the sixties and seventies.

Within its ideological boundaries, his activity was characterized by pragmatism. Due to his extensive personal relationships and his friendship with János Kádár, the powerful leader of the country and the state party MSZMP, he has had a much greater influence on cultural policy and day-to-day practice. He was in a close contact with important personalities of literary-intellectual life, like Zoltán Kodály, Gyula Illyés and György Lukács. On 12 April 1967, he was appointed secretary of the Central Committee of the MSZMP and was entrusted with the general control of cultural life in this capacity. In 1971, he became chairman of the newly formed cultural policy working group within the Central Committee, and held his office until 20 March 1974. Meanwhile, he was elected to the Political Committee of the MSZMP (Hu: Politikai Bizottság) on 28 November 1970. He was forced to leave the post under the pressure of the hardline leftist party faction opposing the 1968 economic-social reforms, but as "consolation" he was elected the vice-president of the Council of Ministers (i.e. Deputy Prime Minister) the following day, on 21 March, as well as the chairman of the State Committee for the Kossuth Prize, and in 1980 the chairman of the National Council for Public Education.

He resigned from all these positions in 1982, when he returned to his former position in the Central Committee on 23 July. Nevertheless, his career and influence was already in decline. Finally, he was dismissed on 28 March 1985. Subsequently, he was Director General of the Party's Social Sciences Institute (Hu: Társadalomtudományi Intézet) until his retirement in October 1989, and remained a member of the Political Committee until 22 May 1988, when he was not re-elected at the 1988 Party Congress.

He played an important role in the failure of Károly Grósz in June 1989 at the Central Committee meeting although he was no longer a member of it. When the MSZMP was officially abolished on 7 October 1989, Aczél retired from politics and began writing his memoirs, but he could not finish it: he died on 6 December 1991.

Not long before his death, Aczél rediscovered his Jewish roots and traveled to Israel.
