= Baumgarten Prize =

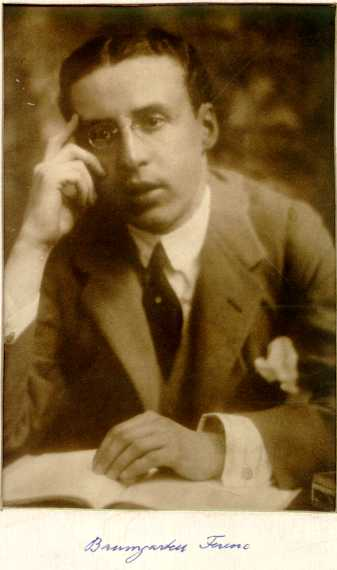
Ferenc Ferdinand Baumgarten (Budapest, November 6, 1880 – Ótátrafüred, January 18, 1927).

The Baumgarten Prize was a literary prize founded by Ferenc Ferdinánd Baumgarten on October 17, 1923. It was awarded every year from 1929 to 1949 (except for 1945). In its time, it was the most prestigious literary prize awarded by Hungary, and is considered equivalent to the subsequent literary prizes established in Hungary in the 20th century, being the Attila József Prize and the Kossuth Prize.

In accordance with the founder's will, it was given to Hungarian authors who had pursued literary excellence devoid of biases, regardless of creating material hardship for themselves. The foundation was administered by the Baumgarten Board of Trustees, whose members were lawyer Lóránt Basch and writer Mihály Babits (from 1941, after Babits' death, Aladár Schöpflin), and it was assisted by an 8-member advisory board. During its existence, the prize had a major significance in developing Hungarian literature.

It was given, among others, to the following people: Valéria Dienes (1934), József Erdélyi (1929, 1931, 1933), Andor Endre Gelléri (1932, 1934), Gyula Illyés (four times), Zoltán Jékely (1939), Gyula Juhász (1929, 1930, 1931), Géza Képes (1943, 1949), Antal Molnár (1938), Ágnes Nemes Nagy (1946), László Cs. Szabó (1936), Lőrinc Szabó (1932, 1937, 1944), Zoltán Zelk (1947), Antal Szerb, Miklós Radnóti, Miklós Szentkuthy, Sándor Weöres, Győző Csorba, Áron Tamási (three times), Albert Wass, Emil Kolozsvári Grandpierre, Attila József (posthumous), Károly Kerényi, János Pilinszky, Józsi Jenő Tersánszky (four times), Tibor Déry, Pál Szabó, Lajos Fülep, Gábor Devecseri, László Németh, Nagy Lajos (three times), Magda Szabó (repealed).
