= László Németh =

Hungarian writer

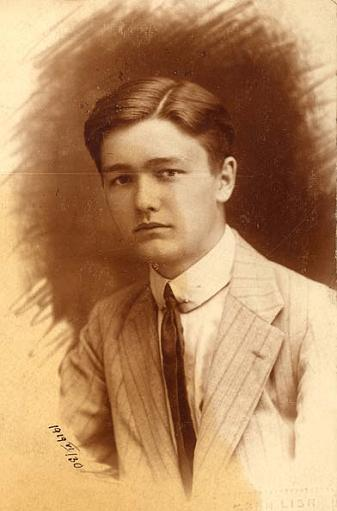
- László Németh in 1919
- Born: April 18 1901; Nagybánya, Austria-Hungary
- Died: April 18 1975, died at 73; Budapest, Hungary
- Resting place: Farkasréti Cemetery, Budapest
- Occupations: translator; dentist; playwright; literary critic; prose writer; publicist; poet; writer
- Spouse: Ella Démusz (married 1925)
- Writing career
- Pen name: László Lelkes
- Notable awards: Baumgarten Prize (1930); Attila József Prize (1951); Kossuth Prize (1957); Gold Order of Merit for Work (1961); Herder Prize (1965); Batsányi Prize (1968)

László Németh (18 April 1901 – 3 March 1975) was a Hungarian writer, dramatist and essayist.

== Early life ==
He was born in Nagybánya, the son of József Németh (1873–1946) and Vilma Gaál (1879–1957). Over the Christmas of 1925, he married Ella Démusz (1905–1989), the daughter of János Démusz, a keeper of a public house. Between 1926 and 1944 they had six daughters, two of whom died in infancy.

Németh was awarded a degree in dentistry in 1925, and worked in Szent János (English: Saint John) Hospital. He founded a dental practice, but later became a medical practitioner for schools.

In 1926 he opened his dental surgery, although he continued to work as a freelance at the Saint John's Hospital in the Department of Neurology. He was a medical practitioner for Toldy School from 1926 to 1927, at the Egressy Street School from 1928 to 1931, and at Medve Street School from 1933 to 1943, when he retired as a medical practitioner. In the winter of 1927 he contracted tuberculosis and travelled to Italy and Felsőgöd to convalesce, retiring from his career as a dentist.

Between 1945 and 1948 he was a casual teacher in the history of Hungarian literature, in mathematics, and other subjects, at the grammar school in Hódmezővásárhely. In 1946 Minister of Education Dezső Keresztury offered him a job as a school inspector for the College of Further Education, and he worked arranging the college's curriculum.

== Literary career ==
In December 1925 Németh won the first prize in a competition run by Nyugat magazine for his short story Horváthné meghal, ("Mrs Horváth Dies").

From 1926 he wrote articles and book reviews for Nyugat magazine, the Protestáns Szemle ("Protestant Review", Társadalomtudomány ("Social Science"), Erdélyi Helikon ("Transylvanian Helikon") and Napkelet ("Sunrise"), for which he was the leading critic until 1931. (In the "Protestant Review" and "Sunrise" he wrote under the pen name of László Lelkes.

In 1927 he became a staff writer for Napkelet. The following year he and his wife travelled to Italy and France. In 1929 he had his first novel published in that magazine, Emberi színjáték ("Human Play"). In 1930, he was awarded the Baumgarten Prize, but he returned it after receiving criticism from Lajos Hatvany. In 1931 he took a érettségi – the equivalent of a General Certificate of Education – in Greek language, and later he studied it at university for a short while.

On 29 November 1931 he attended a literary dinner in Debrecen hosted by the Ady Association, where five folk writers (József Erdélyi, Gyula Illyés, János Kodolányi, Lőrinc Szabó and himself) were warmly received at their public reading.

His relationship with Nyugat magazine was somewhat strained, and in the 1930s he had confrontations with the editor, Mihály Babits, who was a trustee of the Baumgarten Foundation, because of his criticism of Sophie Török. His relationship with Nyugat broke down. In 1943 he wrote a monograph Magam helyett ("Instead of me") in which he stated that one of the reasons for this breakdown was Kodolányi, who disliked the fact that Németh had written a strongly worded letter to Lóránt Basch, who was also a trustee of the Baumgarten Foundation, suggesting that Kodolányi should be given financial assistance. Because of this, the other trustee, Mihály Babits didn't want to help him. It ended embarrassingly, as Németh was in Babits' flat when Basch telephoned Babits to tell him about Németh's letter. From 1932 Németh wrote no more for Nyugat.

On 26 September Németh founded the Tanú ("Witness") magazine, which published 17 issues until 1937. From April 1934 he edited the Válasz ("Answer") newspaper with Lajos Fülep and Pál Gulyás and from 1934 to 1935 he was Head of the Department of Literature at the Magyar Rádió (Hungarian Radio Corporation). During his leadership he tried to encourage and promote contemporary Hungarian literature. In his programmes there were many writers and poets who read their own works and discussed them with Németh – they became well known at the time. The programme became very popular and it influenced later Hungarian literature and the Hungarian Radio Corporation's programme scheduling policy.

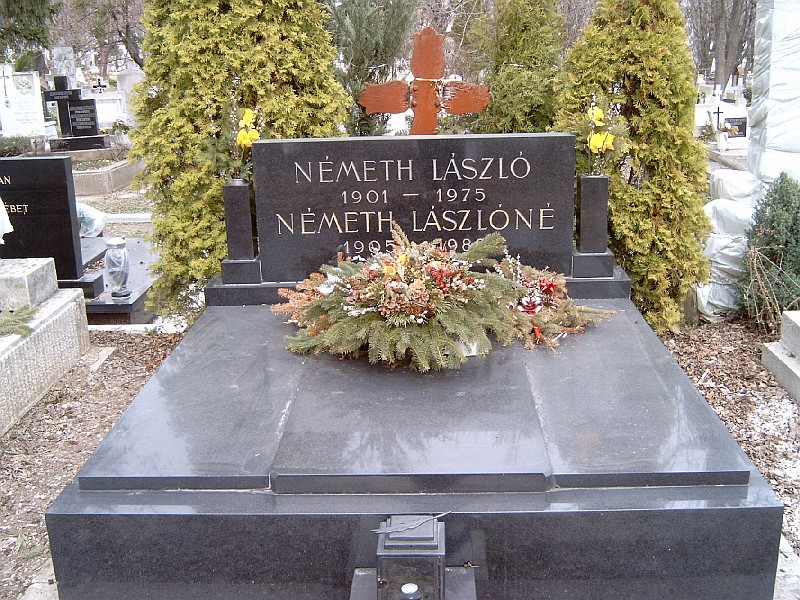
Németh's grave in Farkasréti Cemetery, Budapest

In 1934 Németh's had his first book published, Ember és szerep ("Human and role"). In 1935 he joined in the Új Szellemi Front ("New Intellectual Front") and worked for the Sziget ("Island") periodical and Magyarságtudomány ("Hungarian Science").

On 30 March 1938 the National Theatre premiered one of his plays, Villámfénynél ("Lightning"). Later on the theatre had two other productions based on his works: Papucshős ("Silent Hero") on 4 November 1939, and Cseresznyés ("Cherry Orchard") on 10 January 1942. On 13 May 1939 the National Theatre introduced his historical play, VII. Gergely ("Gregory VII").

Between 1939 and 1942 he was assistant to Zsigmond Móricz at the Kelet Népe ("Eastern Nation") magazine. During World War II he worked for Kelet Népe, the Híd ("Bridge") and the Magyar Csillag ("Hungarian Star") periodicals. Németh collected his monographs and published them in a book called A minőség forradalma ("The Revolution of Quality"). He was one of the lecturers at a conference in Balatonszárszó. At this conference he made a statement about Judaism, which influenced his life and others' attitude towards his works. From 1944 and on, when he made the same speech at conferences he omitted his remarks about Judaism.

From 19 March 1944, during the German occupation he lived in Göd, Szilasbalhás and Budapest. For a short while he stopped writing articles for magazines. After the Soviet Red Army occupied Budapest, Németh and his family moved to Békés.

== Later years ==
In 1959 he visited the Soviet Union. In the last part of his life he lived and worked in Tihany. He died from a stroke on 3 March 1975 in Budapest and was buried in Farkasréti Cemetery there.

In 1969 the publishers Magvető and Szépirodalmi issued his Collected Works.

== Awards ==
- 1951 – the Attila József Prize for his translation of Leo Tolstoy's work Anna Karenina
- 1957 – the Kossuth Prize (he gave the prize money to the Hódmezővásárhely school's library)
- 1961 – Gold Order of Merit for Work
- 1965 – the Herder Prize
- 1968 – the Batsányi Prize.

== Works ==
The English names of the works are approximate translations and are not published titles of them.

=== Novels ===
- Emberi Színjáték (1929) ("Human Play")
- Gyász (1935) ("Mourning")

The protagonist Zsófi Kurátor has lost her husband. After she loses her child too, she spends the rest of her life in mourning. Because she follows the rules of a widow, people in her village treat her as an outcast. The whole community scrutinises her every act: can no man tempt her?

- Iszony (1947) ("Loathing"/"Revulsion")

The protagonist Nelli Kárász is a loner and uninterested in men. After her arranged marriage, Nelli's marriage and life are unhappy. She hates being dependent on her husband, hates the prison of her marriage. Her husband, Sanyi Takaró, abuses her body and soul. Nelli tries to be a good housekeeper, but at the same time a bad wife, because she wants to annoy her husband in the hope that he will leave her. Her husband, however, tries to make his marriage as happy as possible and looks up to his wife as a goddess. Sanyi becomes jealous of one of their friends, even though he knows that Nelli is not interested in him. As the marriage goes downhill Sanyi has affairs with servant girls. The marriage ends with his death: he is very ill and, against doctor's advice, he tries to have sex with Nelli, who resists. In the middle of the battle his heart stops as Nelli smothers his face with a pillow. It is not clear whether he dies of choking or suffocation.

- Égető Eszter (1948) ("Eszter Égető")

The protagonist Eszter tries to fight against life's difficulties. She has three children and a happy marriage, until her husband cheats on her. She looks after her father, helps with their farm, and supports village life. Eszter struggles to make her home, marriage and life happy.

- Irgalom ("Mercy")

=== Plays ===
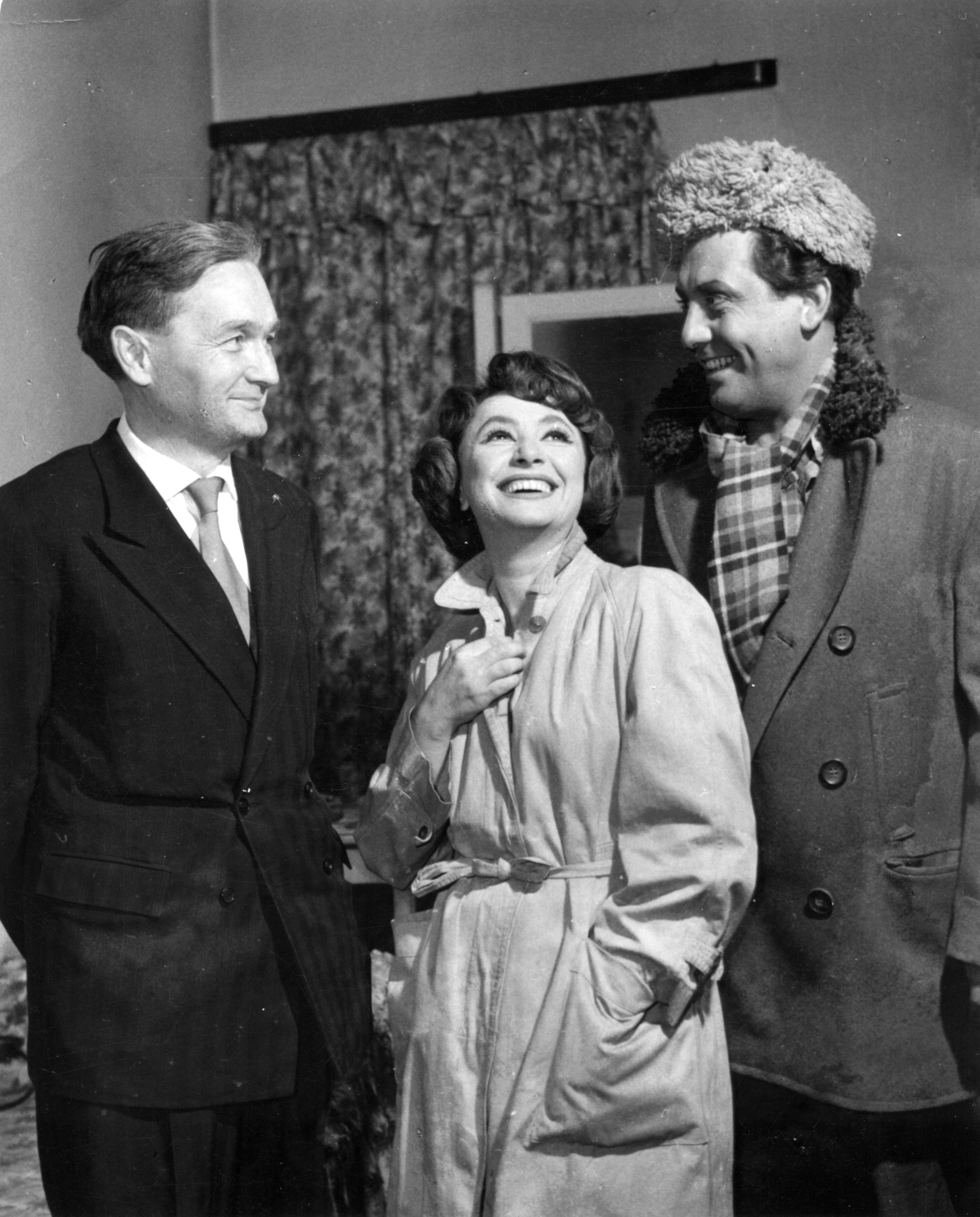
Németh (left) with Katalin Berek and Ferenc Kállai at the National Theater

- Bodnárné (1931) ("Mrs Bodnár")
- II. József ("Joseph II")
- VII. Gergely ("Gregory VII")
- Villámfénynél ("Lightning")
- Pusztuló magyarok (1936–1946) ("Dying Hungarians")
- Papucshős (1938) ("Silent Hero")
- Erzsébet-nap (1940–46) ("Saint Elisabeth's Day")
- Széchenyi (1946) ("Széchenyi")
- Eklézsia-megkövetés (1946) ("Megkövetés Ecclesiology")
- Husz János (1948) ("Jan Hus")
- Galilei (1953) ("Galilei")
- Az áruló (1954) ("The Traitor")
- Petőfi Mezőberényben (1954) ("Petőfi in Mezőberény")
- Apáczai (1955) ("Apáczai")
- A két Bolyai (1961) ("The two Bolyais") (Bolyai is a family name)
- Csapda ("Trap")
- Gandhi halála ("Gandhi's Death")
- Nágy próféta (verses) ("The Four Apostles") (in poetic form)
- Utazás (1961) ("Journey")
- Nagy család ("Large Family")
- Harc a jólét ellen (1964) ("Fight Against Luxury")

=== Essays ===
- A minőség forradalma (1940) ("The Revolution of Quality")
- Készülődés (1941) ("Preparation")
- Kisebbségben (1942) ("In the Minority")
- Sajkódi esték (1961) ("Evenings in Sajkód")
- A kísérletező ember (1963) ("The Experimental Human")

== Memorials ==
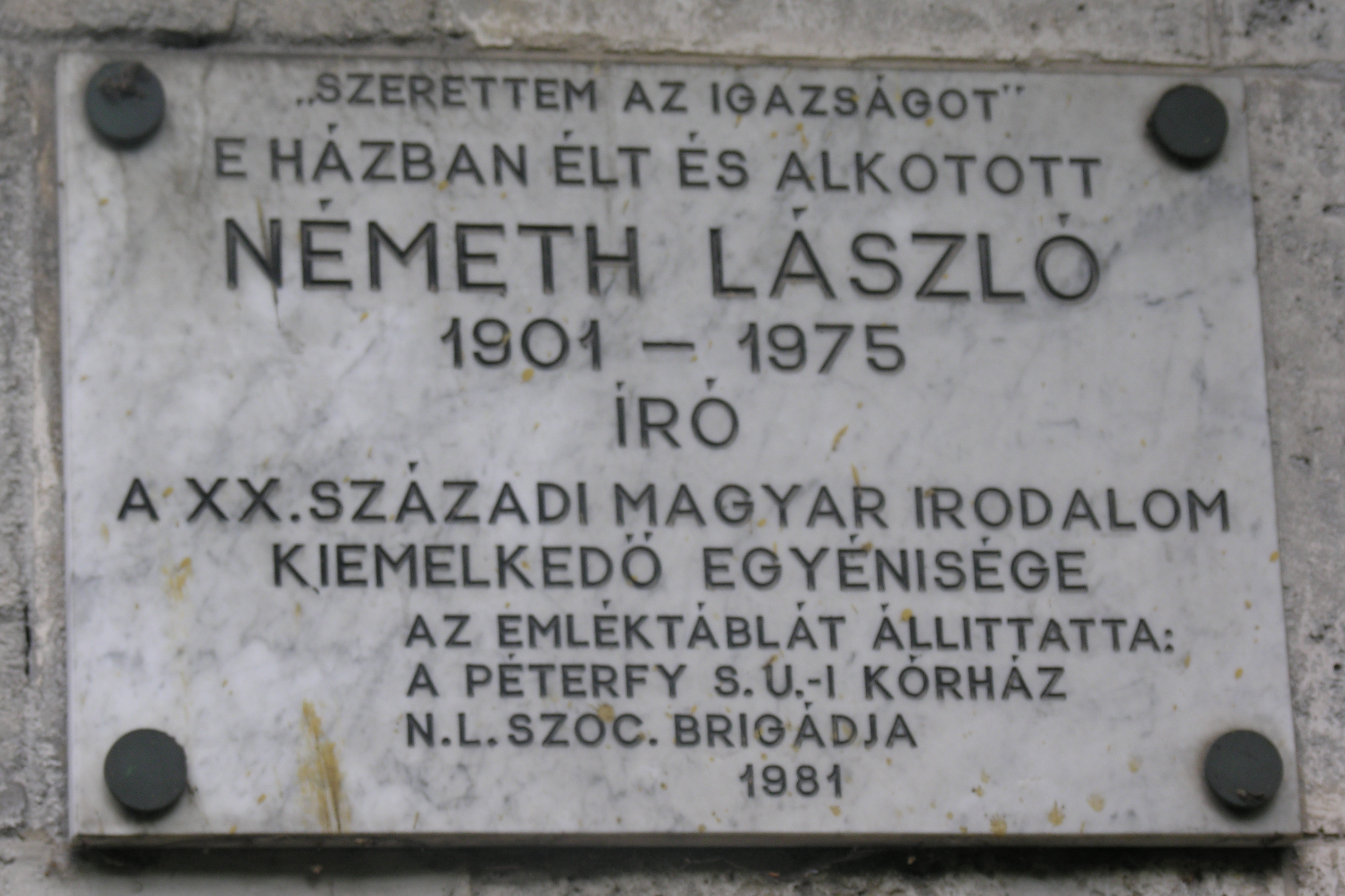
A plaque at 79 Erzsébet Szilágyi Avenue, Budapest II, commemorating that Németh lived there.

- A statue by Róbert Csíkszentmihályi, unveiled on 28 April 2006 at the corner of Pasarét and Radnai streets in Budapest.
- László Németh Prize
- László Németh Grammar School, Budapest XIII.
- László Németh Lyceum, Nagybánya, at 1 Luminişului Street
- László Németh Primary School, Budapest VIII.
- László Németh Primary School, Felsőgöd
- László Németh Primary School, Mezőszilas
- László Németh Primary School, Székesfehérvár

== Sources ==
All the following links and sources are in Hungarian.

- "László Németh's universe". iff.hu. Archived from the original on 13 February 2007. (Membership required)
- "Carrier and memorable stories". fazekas.hu.
- "Chasing after László Németh and his friends: Before 1945". kortarsonline.hu. Archived from the original on 21 June 2008.
- "Chasing after László Németh and his friends: After 1945". kortarsonline.hu. Archived from the original on 14 March 2008.
- "László Németh: Mrs Horváth Died". lelkititkaink.hu.
- Bakó, Endre (2006). "László Németh's professorship in Debrecen". Literature, Art and Social Periodical. xxxvii (2). epa.oszk.hu.
- Monostori, Imre, The history of László Németh's life after 1989, Kortársonline ("Contemporary literature online"), archived from the original on 12 December 2009
- László, Péter (1994). "László Németh". New Hungarian Cyclopedia of Literature. 2. Budapest: Akadémiai Kiadó (Academia Publications): 1476–1478. ISBN 963-05-6805-5.
- László Németh's works on MEK (Hungarian Digital Library), MEK
