= Nyugat =

Hungarian literary journal

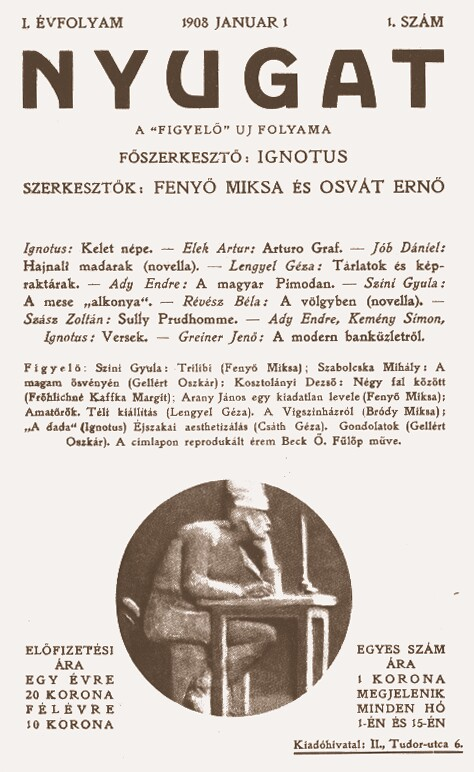
Cover of the first issue (1908)

Nyugat (Note: Hungarian pronunciation: [ˈɲuɡɒt]) (West; pronounced similar to New-Got), was an important Hungarian literary journal in the first half of the 20th century. Writers and poets from that era are referred to as "1st/2nd/3rd generation of the NYUGAT".

== History and profile ==
Nyugat was founded in 1908 and initially edited by Ignotus (Hugo Veigelsberg), Ernő Osvát, and Miksa Fenyő. The magazine was receptive and inspired by the styles and philosophies then current in Western Europe, including naturalism, Symbolism, and impressionism. Nyugat published both poetry and prose writing.

The first generation included the poets Endre Ady, Árpád Tóth, Mihály Babits, Dezső Kosztolányi, Gyula Juhász and Géza Gyóni, and the novelists Gyula Krúdy and Zsigmond Móricz.

During World War I, Nyugat was challenged in leftist literary circles, particularly the grouping around Lajos Kassák who published first A Tett and then MA. This left Nyugat frustrated and depressed about the war.

The second generation of Nyugat writers in the twenties – such as Lőrinc Szabó, József Fodor and György Sárközi – displayed post-expressionist tendencies. Poets of this generation included Attila József, Gyula Illyés, Miklós Radnóti and József Erdélyi. Prose writer Sándor Márai wrote family sagas and about social change. László Németh and Tibor Déry were also important novelists of this era.

The third generation in the thirties is sometimes referred to as the "essayist" generation and included Antal Szerb, László Szabó, and Gábor Halász as well as the poets Sándor Weöres, István Vas, Jenő Dsida, Zoltán Zelk, Gábor Devecseri, György Rónay, Zoltán Jékely and László Kálnoky.

Being the first Hungarian language periodical to discuss philosophers such as Nietzsche and Kierkegaard, Nyugat had a significant impact upon scientists and intellectuals who became well known outside Hungary.
