= Bácsmegyei Napló =

Bácsmegyei Napló (lit. County of Bács Journal) was a Hungarian language daily newspaper. The first issue of the paper was published on June 14, 1903, with the purpose of serving as the information source for the Magyars and Hungarian language-speaking population in Bács-Bodrog County within the Kingdom of Hungary in Austria-Hungary. It was also published in the Kingdom of Serbs, Croats and Slovenes. The paper was published in Subotica (Today in Serbia). Bácsmegyei Napló survived World War I the ban from 1917 and it reappeared in 1920. It was banned again in March 1920 but reappeared in August the same year. Its editors-in-chief were Ferens Fenyves, Imre Dugovich, Kosztolányi, László Czebe, Lazar Stipić, and Mihály Bródy. Bácsmegyei Napló was finally disestablished in 1941.

== See also ==
- Hungarians in Vojvodina
