= László Kálnoky =

Hungarian poet and literary translator (1912–1985)

László Kálnoky (Eger, September 5, 1912 – Budapest, July 30, 1985) was a Hungarian poet and literary translator.

He belonged to the third generation of Nyugat. His poetry was highly typical of pessimism.

== Books of poetry ==
- Az árnyak kertje [The Garden of the Shadows] (1939)
- Lázas csillagon [In a Feverish Star] (1957)
- Lángok árnyékában [In the Shadow of the Flames] (1970)
- Letépett álarcok [Tearing Off the Masks] (1972)
- Farsang utóján [At the End of the Carnival] (1977)
- A szemtanú [The Eyewitness] (1979)
- Összegyűjtött versek [Collected Poems] (1980, 1992, 2006) ISBN 963-389-710-6
- Egy hiéna utóélete és más történetek [The Posterity of a Hyena and Other Stories] (1981)
- Az üvegkalap [The Glass Hat] (1982)
- Bálnák a parton [Whales on the Shore] (1983)
- A gyógyulás hegyén [At the Mountain of Recovery] (1983)
- Egy mítosz születése [The Birth of a Myth] (1985)
- Hőstettek az ülőkádban (1986)
- Egy pontosvessző térdkalácsa (1996)
