= Lajos Nagy (writer) =

Hungarian writer

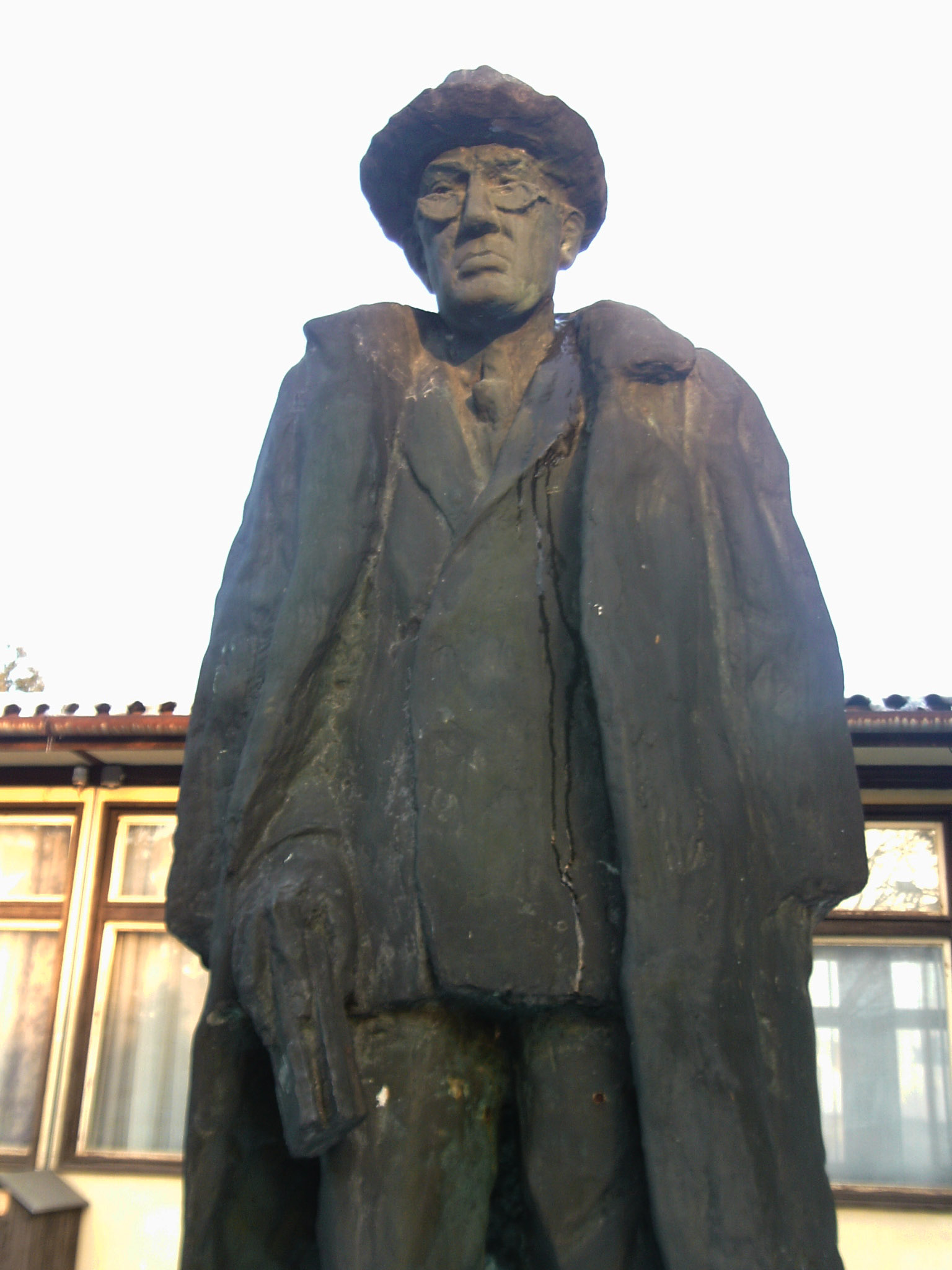
Monument to Lajos Nagy

Lajos Nagy (5 February 1883 – 28 October 1954) was a Hungarian writer. His work covered a number of genres, including travel literature. "He came up with his brief, humoristic stories about animals in the beginning of the 1920s and in 1922 a collection of these short humoresques was published under the title Nonsensical Natural History (Képtelen természetrajz)." He joined the Hungarian Communist Party in 1945 and is considered to be one of the prominent writers in the style of socialist realism in Hungary.

== Awards ==
- Baumgarten Prize (1932, 1935 and 1938)
- Kossuth Prize (1948)

== Selected works ==
- Három magyar város (Three Hungarian towns) (1933)
- Kiskunhalom (1934)
