= Attila út =

Road in the 1st District of Budapest

Attila út is a road with heavy traffic in the 1st District of Budapest. It runs between Krisztina Boulevard and Elisabeth Bridge. Between the bridge and the Horváth Garden it is a one-way route towards Széll Kálmán Square.

There are three important bus lines here. It is served with bus No 5 between Krisztina Boulevard and Elisabeth Bridge. Alagút utca is connected with the bridge by Bus No 178. Alagút utca is accessible from Dózsa György Square with Bus No 116.

== Extension ==
It is bordered by 3 Döbrentei utca and 18 Vérmező utca.

== History ==
Section between Sarló utca and Attila köz was called Kirchesäulenplatz (German for Church Sculpture Square), after 1874 it had a new name, Szent János tér (Saint John Square). Part between Szarvas tér and Döbrentei tér was called Alsó Palota út (Lower Castle Street) after 1872. Between Döbrentei tér and Szent János utca it was mentioned as Hauptstrasse (German for Main Street), and Neugasse (New Street) from the 19th century. After 1854 we may find it as Attilagasse, after 1874 Attila út, from 1890-től Attila körút. It was called IV. Béla út between Sarló utca and Várfok utca.

It got its current name after a Restaurant operated in the Street.

Current line was made in 1961 after the restructuring of the road system in Tabán and Krisztinaváros. It was the time of the last reconstruction of the road in the 20th century

Between May and October 2001 the segment between Döbrentey tér and Mikó utca was fully renovated, all tubes under the street have been changed, there has been built new sidewalk, and has been paved, there are new bars.

== Interesting places ==
=== Odd side ===
- Tabán
- Apród utca
- Szarvas tér
- Attila köz
- Palota út
- Dózsa tér
  - Group of sculptures about György Dózsa, made by István Kiss in 1961.
- Attila köz
- Attila út 37.
  - Resident of MP Endre Bajcsy-Zsilinszky, he was deported from this house in 1944 (memorial plaque at the side of the house. (memorial tablet)

Sarló utca

- Attila út 39.
  - House of Aladár Gerevich egykori lakóháza (memorial tablet)
- Attila út 43.
  - Petőfi Sándor Grammar School (Werbőczi István Secondary Grammar School till 1948)
  - Memorial tablet of the Budai Tornacsarnok (Gymnasium of Buda) (on the wall of the School, Gymnasium was situated at Horváth-kert.)
- Attila út 45.
  - Residential house of Géza Ottlik, built in 1958 (memorial tablet).
- Alagút utca
- Zerge lépcső
- Mikó utca
- Attila út 81.
  - Place of Terész Brunszvik’s first Angel Garden (nursery school) (memorial tablet)
- Attila út 93.
  - National Library and Documentation Centre of Agriculture
- Bugát utca
- Korlát utca
- Attila út 133.
  - Residential house of Mihály Babits poet and Frigyes Hidas component (memorial tablet).
- Körmöci utca
- Attila út 135-137.
  - Kosztolányi DezsőSecondary Grammar School
- Vérmező út

=== Even side ===
- Tabán
- Attila út 2.
  - Bethlen-udvar. Built in 1923-1924
- Tabán
- Horváth-kert
  - Sculpture of John of Nepomuk in the once Szent János tér.
  - Memorial of Joseph Haydn, made by András Kocsis
  - Bronze sculpture of Béni Ferenczy: Sitting woman, 1961.
  - Sculpture of Róza Széppataki (Botond Polgár, 2010), copy of Miklós Ligeti’s sculpture from 1935.
- Alagút utca
- Mikó utca
- Vérmező
  - Place of Hungarian Jacobonists’ execution (memorial tablet)
- Krisztina körút

=== Places, tablets of memorial ===
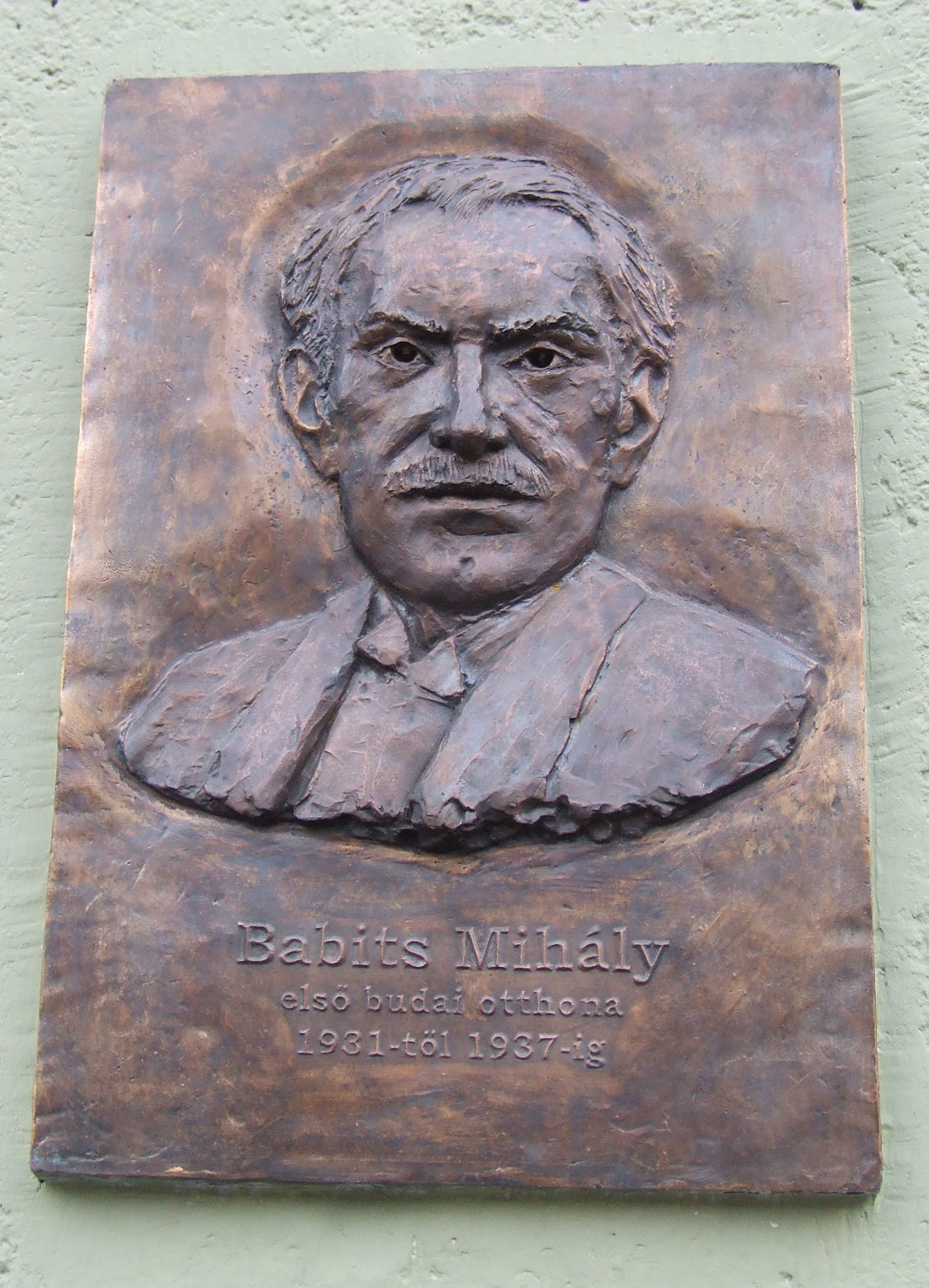
Attila út 133.
Mihály Babits

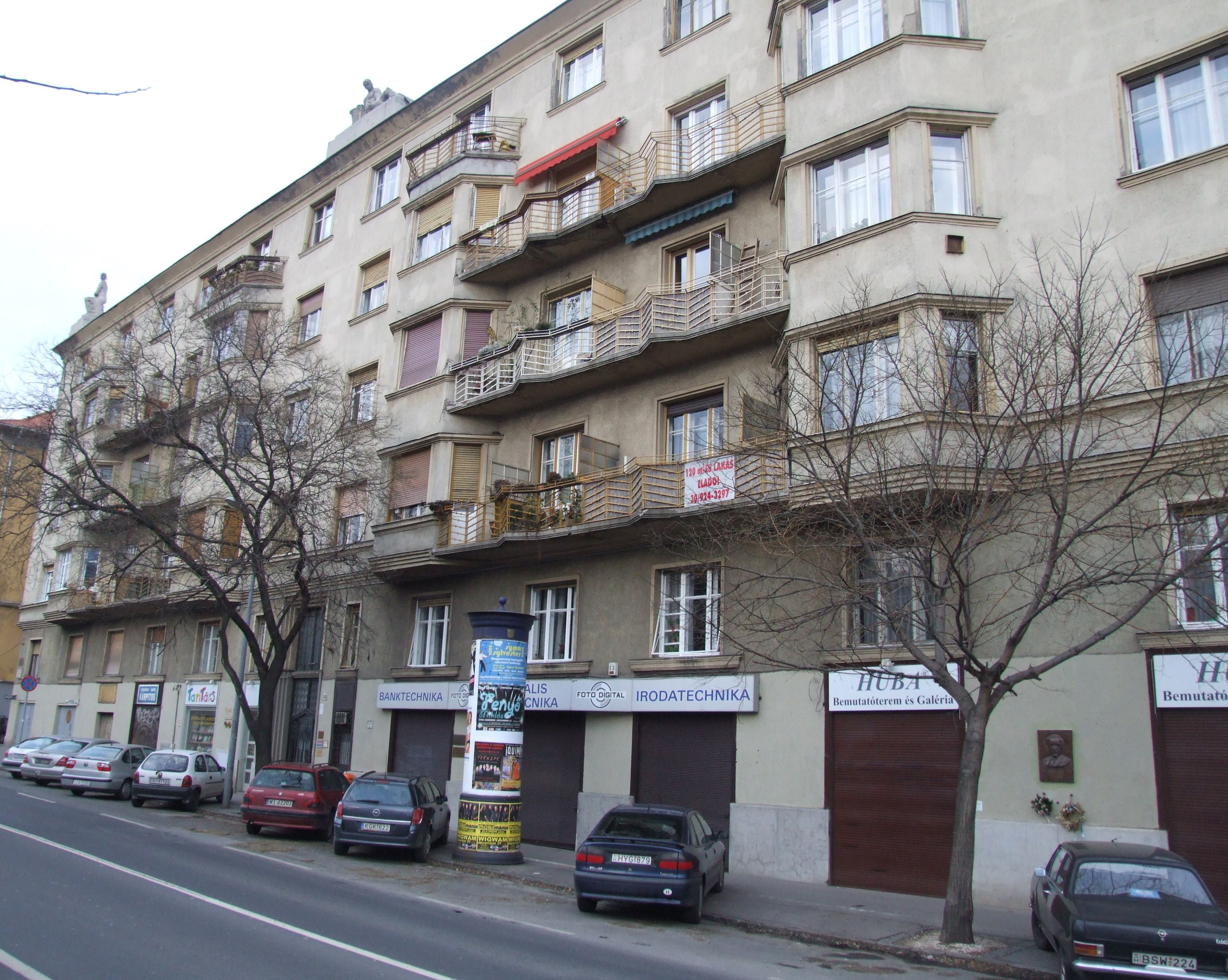
Attila út 133.
earlier: Attila krt. 95-99

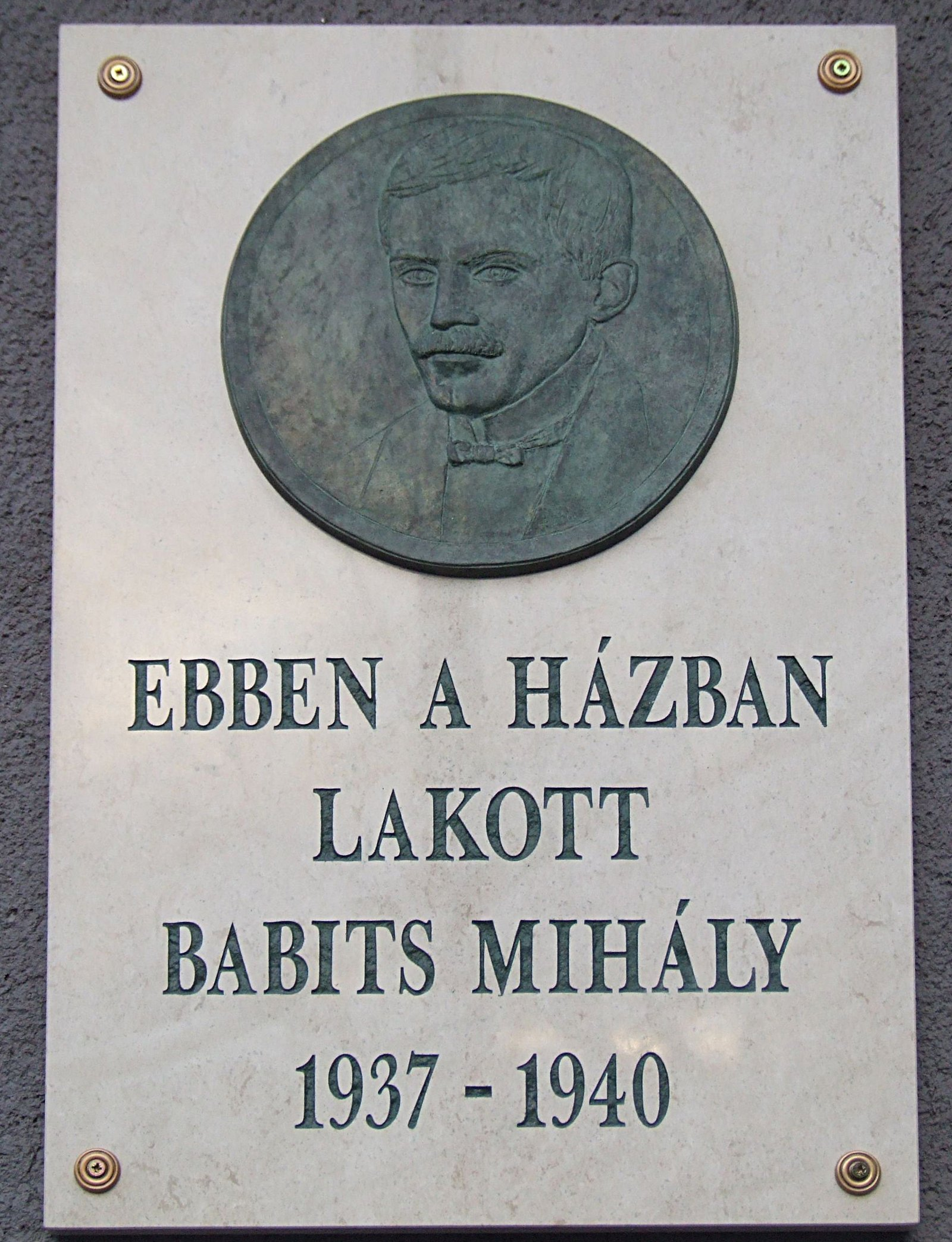
Attila út 103.
prior: Attila krt. 65/B

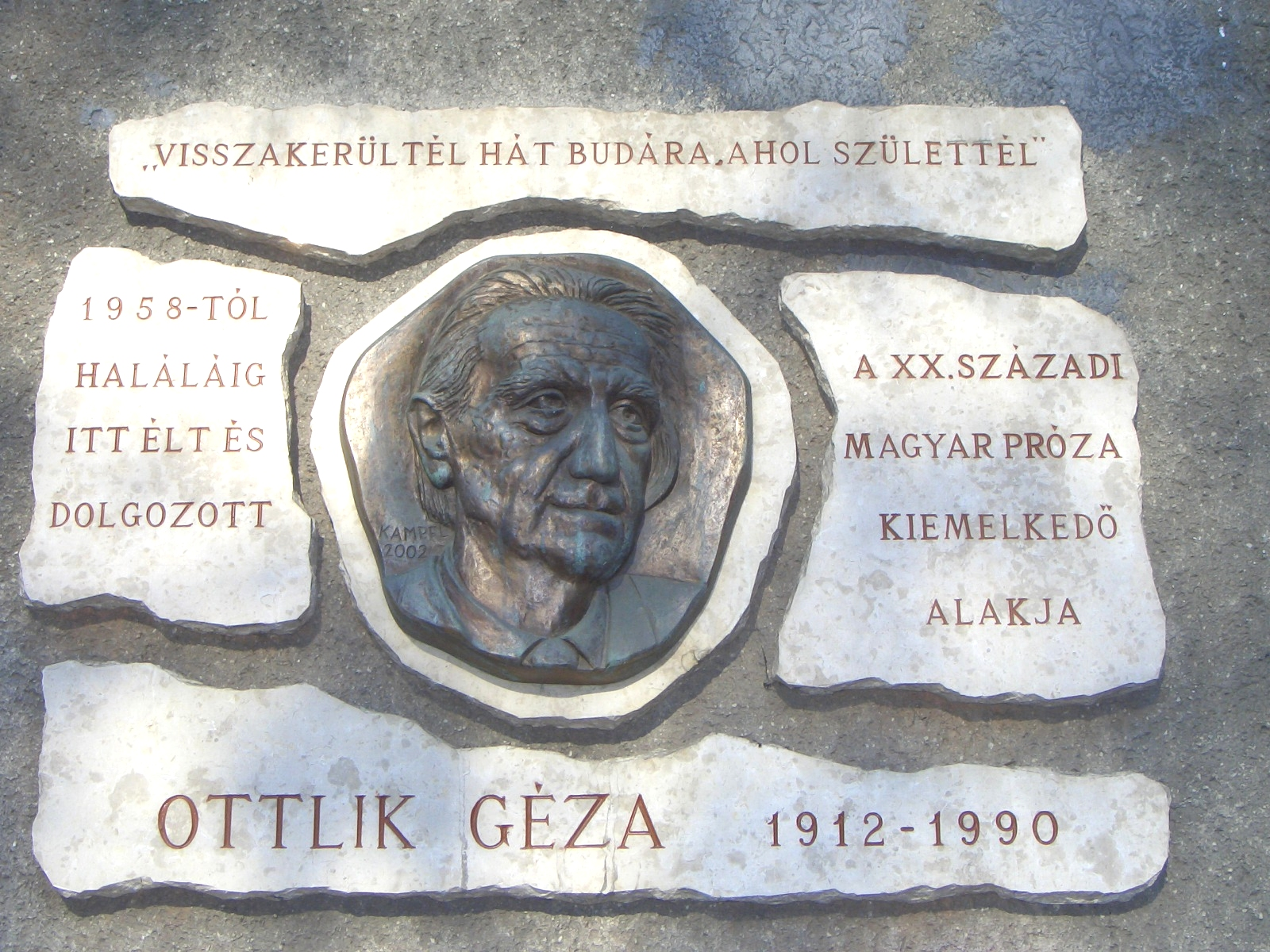
Attila út 45.
Géza Ottlik (prior Attila u. 5.)

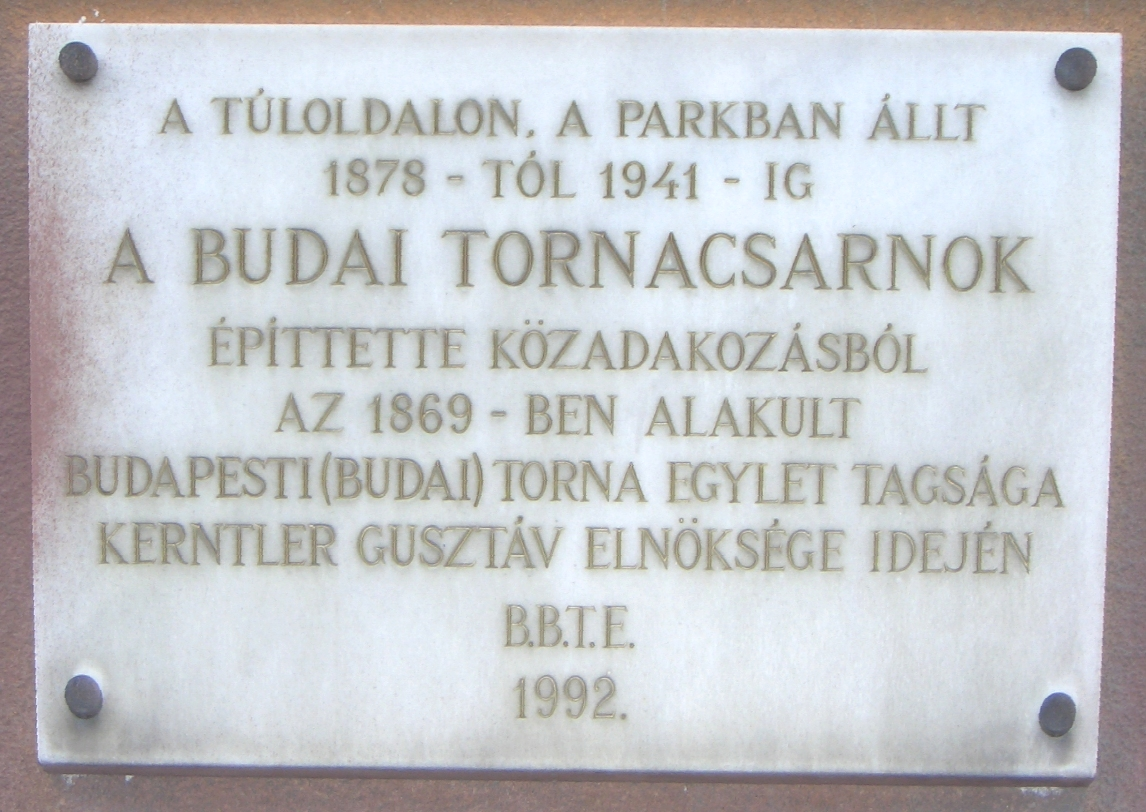
Attila út 43.
Memory of the Budai Tornacsarnok (Horváth-kert)

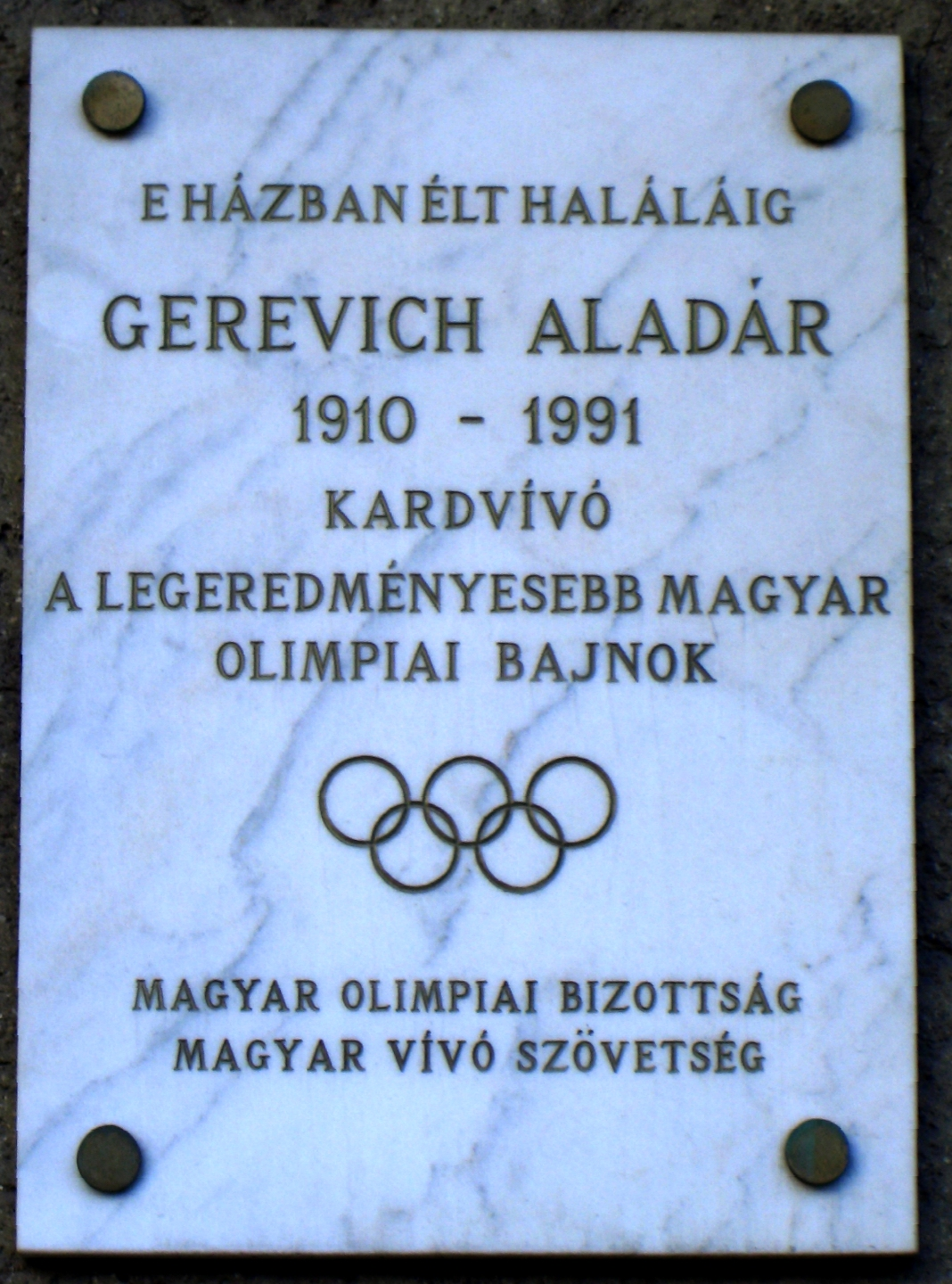
Attila út 39.
Aladár Gerevich

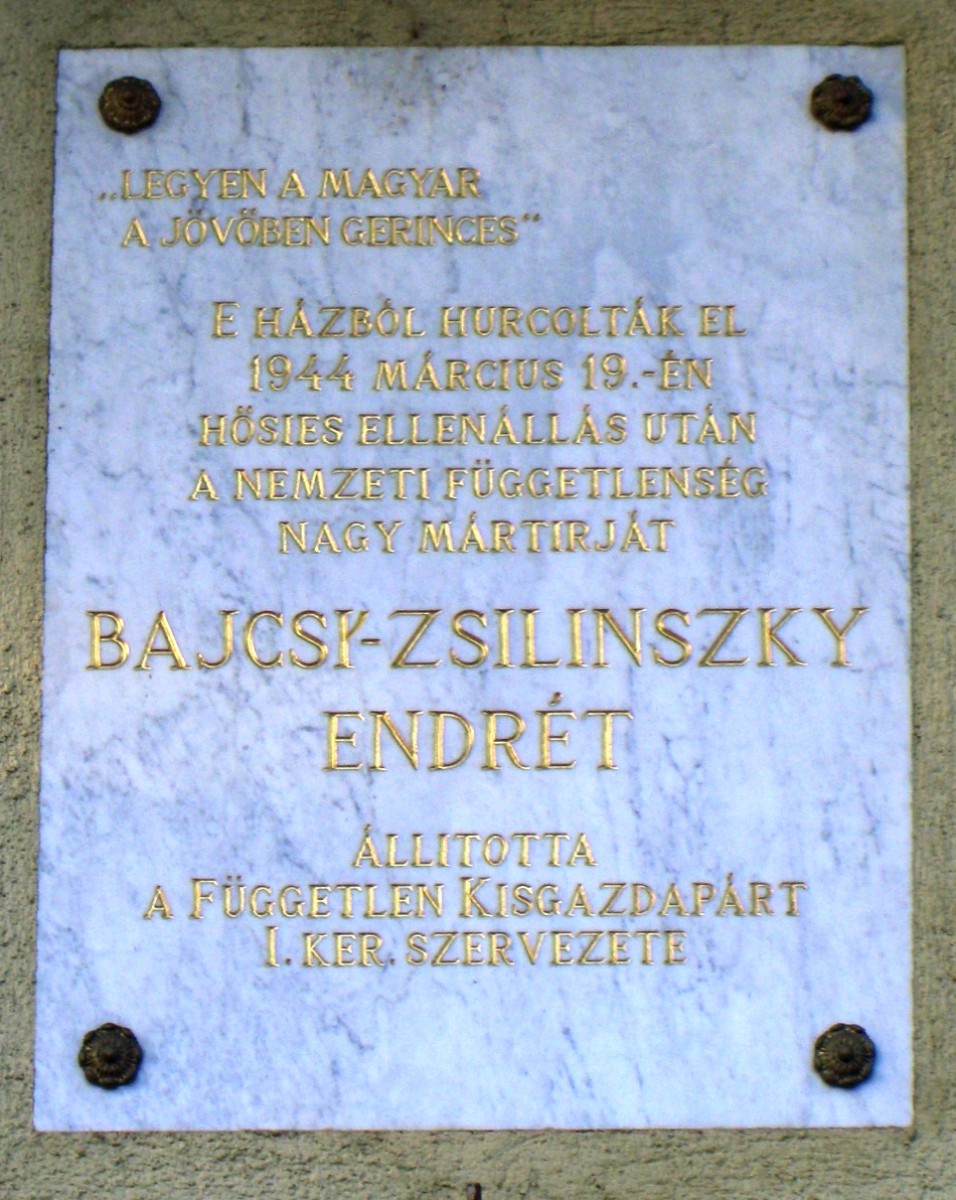
Attila út 37.
Endre Bajcsy-Zsilinszky
