= János Kodolányi =

Hungarian writer

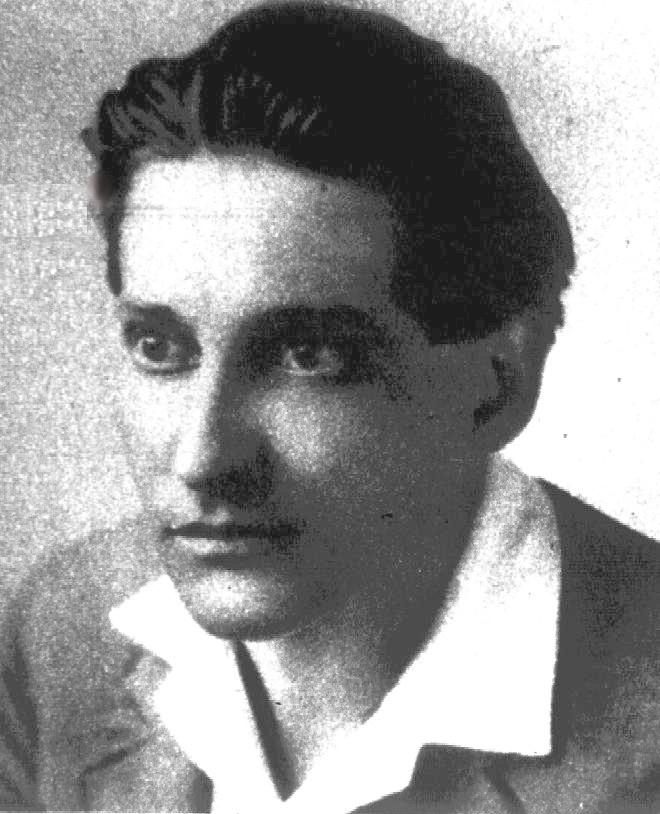
The writer in 1932

János Kodolányi (Kodolányi János; Telki, March 13, 1899 – Budapest, August 10, 1969) Hungarian writer of short stories, dramas, novels and sociographies. The Kodolányi János University of Applied Sciences was named after him.

== Prose and politics ==
He became famous as a sociographic and fictive short-story writer (in his early times, he identificated himself as radical leftist, e.g. he sympathized with illegal communist movement). His prose fiction often draws on autobiographical materials. He was considered to be a populist author seeking reform in imaginative and sociographic writings, socialistic but highly independent. A great deal of his influences came from Marxism and Freudism.

Between 1930 and 1945, he turned to Hungarian past as subject for historical novels, in which he seeks to discover lasting characteristics of Hungarian people. Julianus barát (Frater Julian) has been translated into Italian, and some of his short stories were published in English, French, German, Italian, and Serbian.

In this time he changed some of his views. He thought that Socialism could solve global but not local problems. He oriented himself to the right side more and more. He wrote to nationalist papers, but he opposed National Socialism, Fascism and was against Hitler. He joined to the group of the anti-Nazi resistant Endre Bajcsy-Zsilinszky (a representative in the Parliament of the Independent Smallholders' Party) and a group of writers, the "Folk Writers" (népi írók), along with László Németh, Gyula Illyés, Géza Féja, Zsigmond Móricz and others. He agreed with the political views of László Németh, which he called "The Third Way for Hungary" (neither Nazism, nor Communism).

He was both ridden during fascism and communism. By writing a memorandum to Miklós Horthy jr.'s Secession Office, he got involved into anti-Nazi activities and that's why he had to escape from Balatonakarattya to Budapest in 1944. After Nazis been defeated, an anti-Nazi witch-hunt started by some bourgeois newspapers. Some of the folk writers (like József Erdélyi) really collaborated with Nazis more or less, but men (like Kodolányi or Lőrinc Szabó) were mired too despite they weren't related at all with them. After Géza Féja had been arrested, Kodolányi had to escape from Budapest to Pécs, where he was safer, but he was prohibited to publish anything. He retreated to his house in Balatonakarattya. He wrote his greatest mythic, magic realistic novels there (Vízöntő [Aquarius], Új ég, új föld [New sky, new land], Égő csipkebokor [Burning Bush]), Én vagyok (I am). In these novels, he found his way back to the great myths of mankind, the Epic of Gilgamesh, the Bible and the stories of Utnapishtim, Gilgamesh, Moses, Jesus and Judas.

== Works on the internet ==
Novels	Critics	Short stories
Az égő csipkebokor; A vas fiai; Holdvilág völgye; Szép Zsuzska, Börtön, Kántor József megdicsőülése; Vízözön; Új ég, új Föld; Julianus barát; Jehuda bar Simon emlékiratai; Süllyedő világ (autobiography, portion)	Debrecen; Hortobány (Szép Ernő könyvéről); Meg kell a szívnek hasadni; Pillangó; Színházi tapasztalatok Debrecenben; Művészet a kocsmában	Tél/Fegyveretelen; József, az ács; Vallomás; Házasság; Küszöb; Történelem I.; Történelem II.; Rekkenő nyári nap
