= János Pilinszky =

Hungarian poet (1921–1981)

Pilinszky János
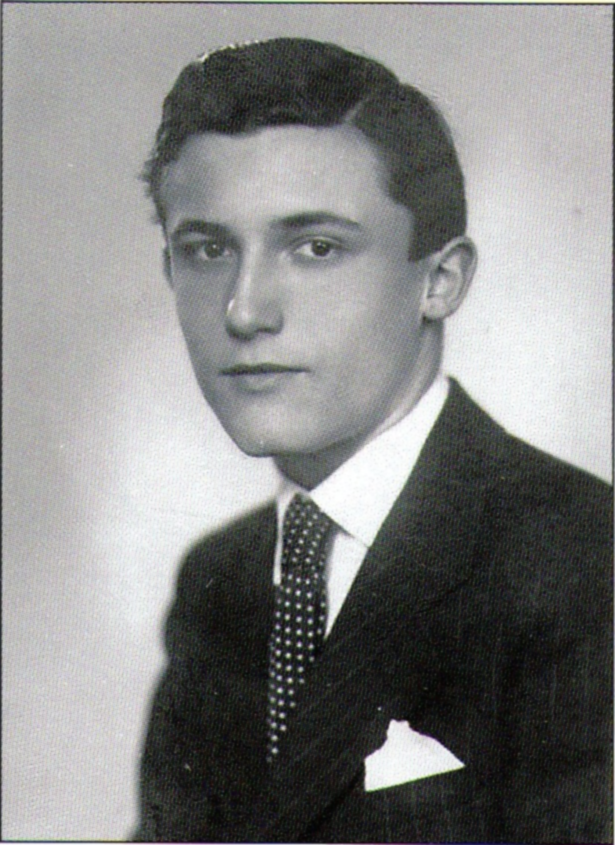
- Born: 27 November 1921; Budapest, Hungary
- Died: 27 May 1981 (aged 59); Budapest, Hungary
- Spouse(s): Anna Márkus (1928–2026) (m. 1955; div. 1956) Ingrid Ficheux (m. 1980)
- Partner: Jutta Scherrer (1970–1976)
- Writing career
- Genre: Poetry
- Notable awards: Baumgarten Prize (1947); Attila József Prize (1971); Kossuth Prize (1980)

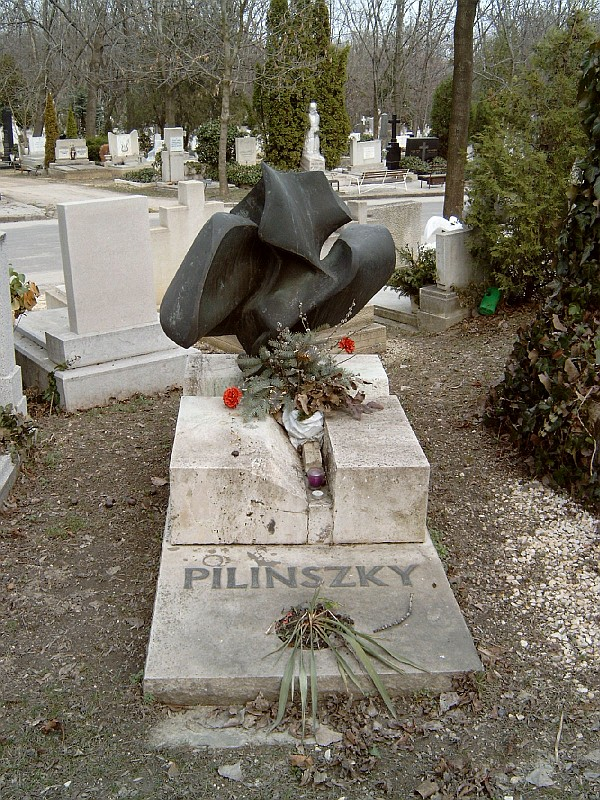
János Pilinszky's grave in Budapest

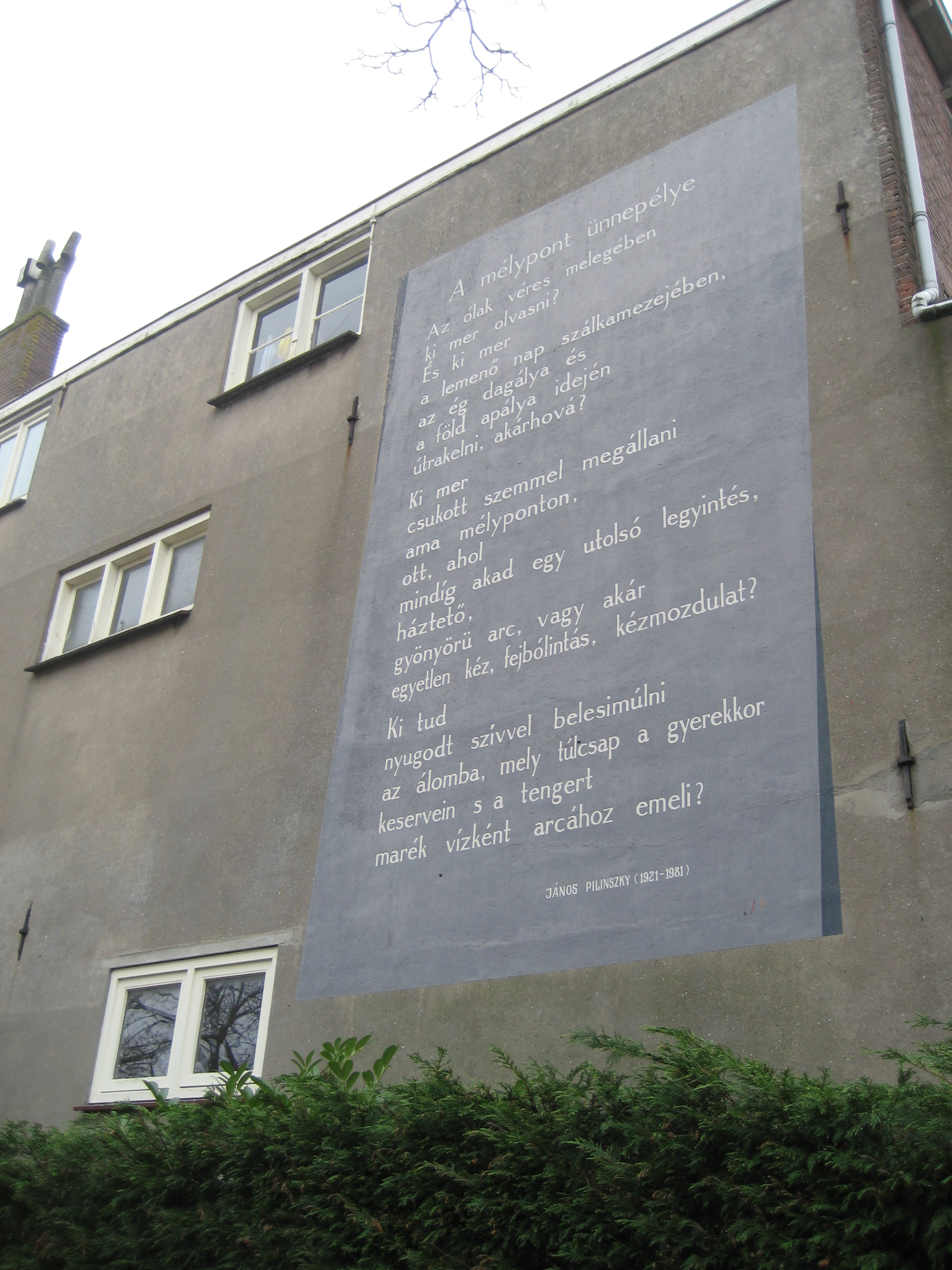
Poem by Pilinszky on a wall in Leiden

János Pilinszky (27 November 1921 – 27 May 1981) was a Hungarian poet regarded as one of the greatest Hungarian poets of the 20th century.

Well known within the Hungarian borders for his vast influence on postwar Hungarian poetry, Pilinszky's style includes a juxtaposition of Roman Catholic faith and intellectual disenchantment. His poetry often focuses on the underlying sensations of life and death; his time as a prisoner of war during the Second World War and later his life under the communist dictatorship furthered his isolation and estrangement.

Born in a family of intellectuals in 1921, Pilinszky went on to study Hungarian literature, law, and art history at Eötvös Loránd University, Budapest, in 1938. Although he failed to complete his studies, it was during this same year that his first works of poetry were published in several varying literary journals. In 1944 he was drafted into the army; his unit being ordered to follow the retreating German allies, he arrived at Harbach, a small village in Germany, after a march of several weeks. Adrift in Germany, he witnessed several camps before he could return to Hungary after the end of the war, most notably the Ravensbrück concentration camp. What he saw in the camps was an experience he never forgot and later commemorated in a great number of poems, most notably, KZ-oratórium ("KZ oratory"), Ravensbrücki passió ("Passion of Ravensbrück"), Harbach 1944, etc.

Following the publication of his first body of work in 1946, Trapéz és korlát ("Trapeze and Bars"), he was awarded the Baumgarten Prize in 1947. While Trapéz és korlát consists of only 18 poems, it established Pilinszky as a major poetic force in Hungary.

His next publication, 1959's Harmadnapon ("On the third day"), was not released for over 10 years as a result of his being labeled “pessimistic” by the ruling Hungarian Communist Party in the 1950s. Harmadnapon contains his poem Apokrif ("Apocrypha"), considered his chef-d'oeuvre, which many see as one of the highest peaks of Hungarian poetry. The poem has the return of the prodigal son to his parents in its center, and summarises Pilinszky's poetic world from his experiences in the lagers to his alienation and the painful absence of God from the world.

From 1960 to 1970, he traveled the United States and Europe taking part in several poetry readings. In 1971 he was awarded the József Attila Prize for his collection entitled Nagyvárosi ikonok ("Metropolitan Icons"). His monumental and visionary poems gave way to short, epigrammatic verses over time. 1972 saw the publication of Szálkák ("Splinters"), followed by Végkifejlet ("Dénouement") in 1974. His last collection, Kráter ("Crater") was published in 1975, containing both new poems and the majority of his rather short, but extremely substantial and concise oeuvre rearranged in cycles. He was awarded the Kossuth Prize in 1980 before returning to Budapest where he died of a heart attack in 1981.

Pilinszky lead a reserved private life. His alleged homosexuality was object of study by the geneticist Endre Czeizel, who concluded that the poet could not accept his sexual orientation because of his religious views. Eventually, he married a French woman, Ingrid Ficheux, 11 months before his death.

His poems were translated into several languages; most notably, his English translator was Ted Hughes (in collaboration with János Csokits), while most French translations were made by his friend Pierre Emmanuel.

A documentary about his life was produced in 2016.
