= Árpád Tóth =

Hungarian poet (1886–1928)

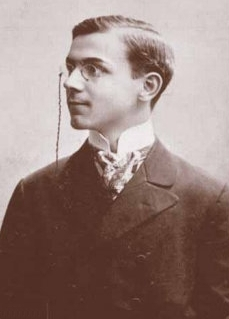
- Tóth circa 1907
- Born: 14 April 1886; Arad, Austria-Hungary
- Died: 7 November 1928 (aged 42); Budapest, Hungary
- Occupations: Poet, translator

Árpád Tóth (14 April 1886 – 7 November 1928) was a Hungarian poet and translator.

Tóth went to secondary school (gymnasium) in Debrecen and then studied German and Hungarian at the University of Budapest. In 1907, his poems began to appear in the newspapers A Hét and Vasárnapi Ujság and after 1908 in Nyugat. In 1911, he became a theater critic for the newspaper Debreceni Nagy Újság.

In 1913, he became a tutor to a wealthy family and received a little income from writing but still lived in poverty. Tuberculosis led him to rest at the Svedlér sanatorium in the Tatra Mountains.

During the period of the revolutionary government after World War I, he became secretary of the Vörösmarty Akadémia, but lost the position and couldn't find new work after the government's fall. He remained poor and sick with tuberculosis for the rest of his life, succumbing to the disease in Budapest in 1928. His prolonged suffering led him to consider suicide at one point – although he did join the staff of Az Est in 1921.

In Debrecen, a secondary school was named after him. In April 2011, the Hungarian National Bank issued a commemorative silver coin celebrating the 125th anniversary of the poet's birth.

== Works ==
He was a major lyric poet and contributed to the Nyugat School. His core themes focused on fleeting happiness and resignation.

He translated Milton, Oscar Wilde, Shelley, Keats, Baudelaire, Flaubert, Gautier, Maupassant, and Chekhov.
