= Gyula Juhász (poet) =

Hungarian poet (1883–1937)

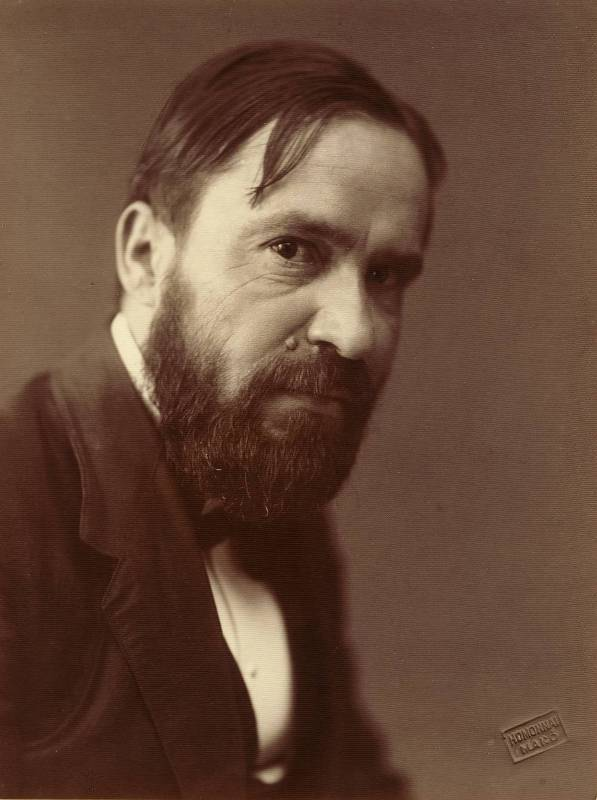
- Gyula Juhász
- Born: 4 April 1883 Szeged, Kingdom of Hungary, Austria-Hungary
- Died: 6 April 1937 (aged 54) Szeged, Hungary
- Genre: Poetry
- Notable awards: Baumgarten Prize

Gyula Juhász (4 April 1883, Szeged – 6 April 1937, Szeged) was a Hungarian poet, who was awarded the Baumgarten Prize.

His first poems were published in Szegedi Napló in 1899. Between 1902 and 1906 he was a student of the University of Budapest, where he met Mihály Babits and Dezső Kosztolányi.

Throughout his life, Juhász made multiple suicide attempts. He eventually died after overdosing on his headache relief medicine, in 1937.
