= Dezső Kosztolányi =

Hungarian writer, journalist and translator

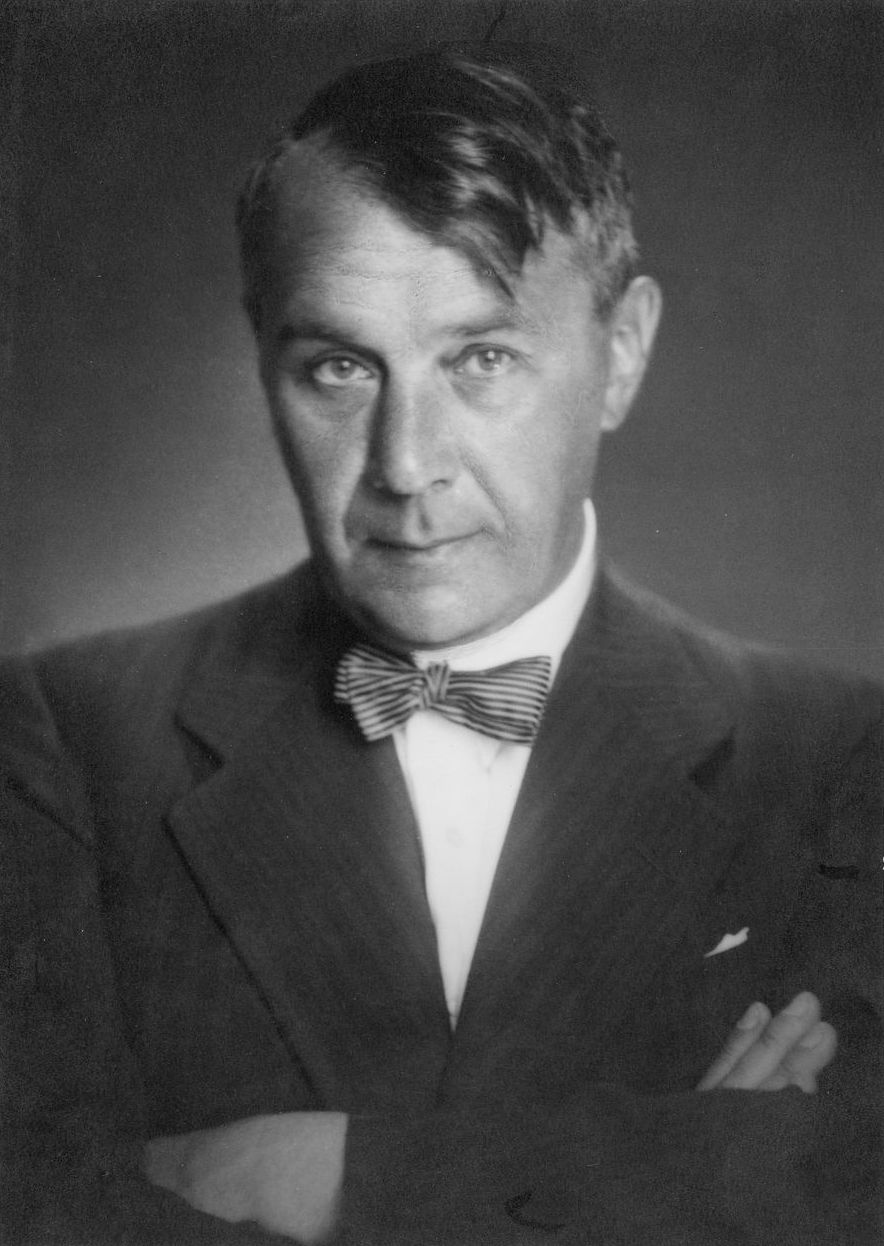
- Kosztolányi by Aladár Székely (1935)
- Born: 29 March 1885; Szabadka, Austria-Hungary (today Subotica, Serbia)
- Died: 3 November 1936 (aged 51); Budapest, Kingdom of Hungary

Signature
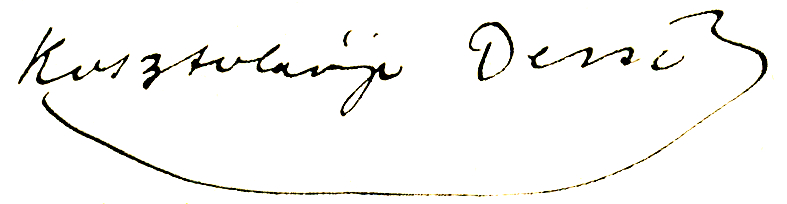

Dezső Kosztolányi (Hungarian pronunciation: [ˈdɛʒøː ˈkostolaːɲi]; March 29, 1885 – November 3, 1936) was a Hungarian writer, journalist, translator, and also a speaker of Esperanto. He wrote in all literary genres, from poetry to essays to theatre plays. Building his own style, he used French symbolism, impressionism, expressionism and psychological realism. He is considered the father of futurism in Hungarian literature.

== Biography ==
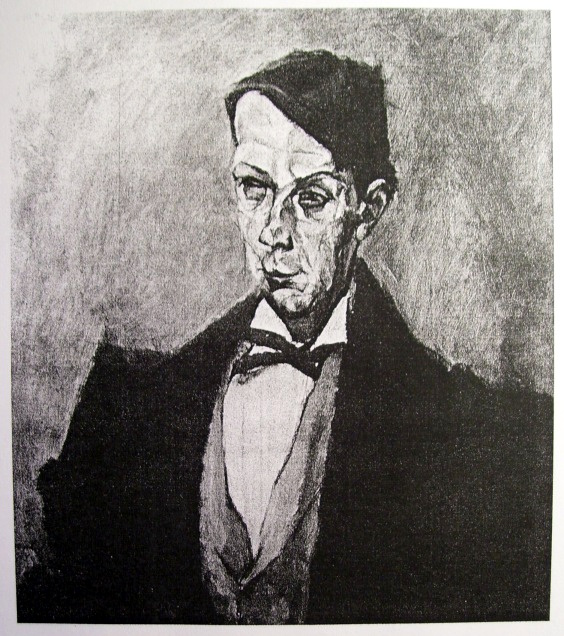
Portrait by Lajos Tihanyi from 1914

Kosztolányi was born in Szabadka, Austria-Hungary (today Subotica, Serbia) in 1885. The city served as a model for the fictional town of Sárszeg, in which he set his novella Skylark as well as The Golden Kite. He was the child of Árpád Kosztolányi (1859–1926), physics and chemistry professor and headmaster of a school, and Eulália Brenner (1866–1948), who was of French origin. He started high school in Szabadka but because of a conflict with his teachers he was expelled, and so he graduated as a private student in Szeged. Kosztolányi moved to Budapest in 1903, where he studied at the University of Budapest and met the poets Mihály Babits and Gyula Juhász, and later for a short time in Vienna before becoming a journalist—a profession he continued for the rest of his life.

In 1908, Kosztolányi replaced the poet Endre Ady, who had left for Paris, as a reporter for a Budapest daily. In 1910, his first volume of poems, The Complaints of a Poor Little Child, brought nationwide success and marked the beginning of a prolific period in which he published a book nearly every year. He met the actress Ilona Harmos in the winter of 1910; they were married on 8 May 1913. They had one son. Kosztolányi died in 1936 from cancer of the larynx.

== Writings ==
The literary journal Nyugat (Hungarian for "West"), which played an invaluable role in the revitalization of Hungarian literature, was founded in 1908 and Kosztolányi was an early contributor, one of what is often called the "first Nyugat generation", publishing mainly poetry.

Starting in the 1920s he wrote novels, short stories, and short prose works, including Nero, the Bloody Poet (to the German edition to which Thomas Mann wrote the introduction), Skylark, The Golden Kite, Kornél Esti and Anna Édes. In 1924 he published a volume of verse harkening back to his early work, entitled The Complaints of the Sad Man.

Kosztolányi also produced literary translations in Hungarian, such as Shakespeare's Romeo and Juliet, The Winter's Tale, Lewis Carroll's Alice in Wonderland, Thornton Wilder's The Bridge of San Luis Rey, Lord Alfred Douglas' memoirs on Oscar Wilde, and Rudyard Kipling's "If—". He was the first authentic translator of Rilke's poetry, and he worked a Hungarian masterpiece after Paul Valéry's Cimetiere Marin.

== Bibliography ==
- Nero, a véres költő (1922). Darker Muses: The Poet Nero (Corvina, 1990).
- Pacsirta (1924). Skylark, trans. Richard Aczel (Chatto & Windus, 1993; New York Review Books, 2010).
- Aranysárkány (1925). The Golden Kite.
- Anna Édes (1926). Trans. George Szirtes (Quartet, 1991; New Directions, 1993).
- Kornél Esti (1934). Trans. Bernard Adams (New Directions, 2011).
