= Gyula Illyés =

Hungarian poet and novelist

Illyés Gyula
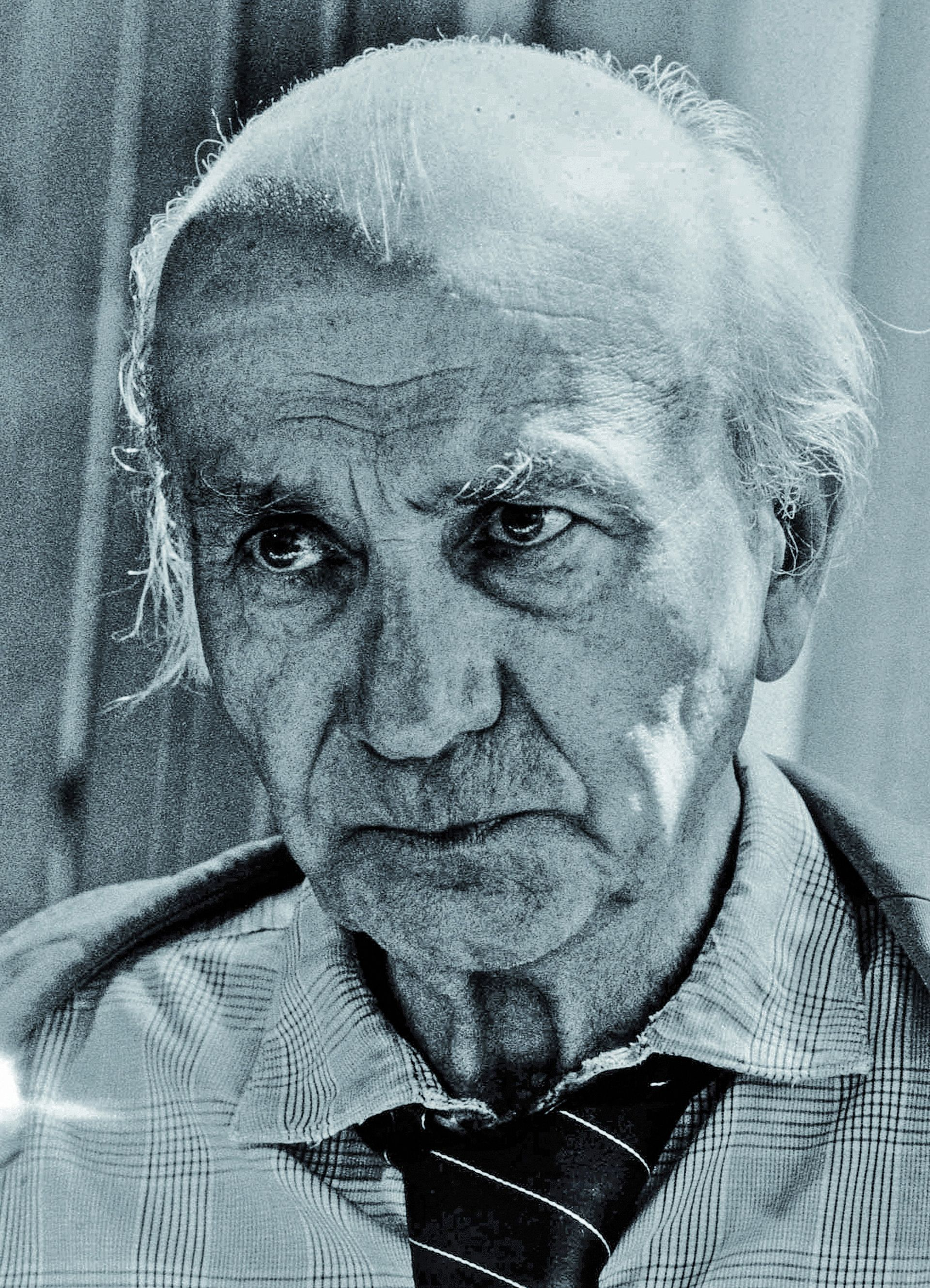
- Born: 2 November 1902; Felsőrácegrespuszta, near Sárszentlőrinc, Tolna County
- Died: 15 April 1983 (aged 80); Budapest
- Spouse(s): Irma Juvancz (married 1931); Flóra Kozmutza (married 1939)
- Relatives: Father: János Illés; Mother: Ida Kálley; Daughter: Maria

Gyula Illyés born Gyula Illés (2 November 1902 – 15 April 1983) was a Hungarian poet and novelist. He was one of the so-called népi ("from the people") writers, named so because they aimed to show – propelled by strong sociological interest and left-wing convictions – the disadvantageous conditions of their native land.

== Early life ==
He was born the son of János Illés (1870–1931) and Ida Kállay (1878–1931) in Tolna County. His father was Catholic, while the Kállays were Calvinists. János was initially a shepherd like his father, then learned the trade of blacksmith, and took jobs in various manors making repairs, and later becoming a supervisor of blacksmiths, stokers and machinists. Ida came from a mainly peasant family, although the Kállays also gave soldiers and preachers to the country. His maternal grandfather was a wheelwright in the manor of Felsőrácegrespuszta. He was their third child and spent his first nine years at his birthplace, where he finished his primary school years (1908–12) and when his family moved to Simontornya, he continued his education at grammar schools there and Dombóvár (1913–14) and Bonyhád (1914–16). In 1916 his parents separated, and he moved to the capital with his mother. He continued senior high school at the Budapest Munkácsy Mihály street gimnazium (1916–17) and at the Izabella Street Kereskedelmi school (1917–21). In 1921 he graduated. From 1918 to 1919 he took part in various left-wing students and youth workers' movements, being present at an attack on Romanian forces in Szolnok during the Hungarian Republic of Councils. On 22 December 1920 his first poem was published (El ne essél, testvér) anonymously in the Social Democrat daily Népszava.

== University years ==
He began studies at the Budapest University's department of languages studying Hungarian and French. Due to illegal political activities he was forced to escape to Vienna in December that year, moving on to Berlin and the Rhineland in 1922.

Illyés arrived in Paris in April that year; living at 9 Rue Budé, Île Saint-Louis. He did numerous jobs including as a bookbinder. For a while he studied at the Sorbonne and published his first articles and translations in 1923. He became friends with the French surrealists, among them Paul Éluard, Tristan Tzara and René Crevel (each visited him later in Hungary).

During his emigration to Paris, to spare his family members back home he published poems under the name Gyula Illyés (from 1925), and he continued to be published under this pen name, which he took on officially in 1933.

Illyés returned to homeland in 1926 following an amnesty. His main forums of activity became Dokumentum and Munka, periodicals edited by the avant-garde writer and poet Lajos Kassák.

== Early career ==
Illyés worked for the Phoenix Insurance company from 1927 to 1936, and after its bankruptcy he became press referent to the Hungarian National Bank on French agricultural matters (1937 – 1944).

His first critical writing appeared in November 1927 in the review Nyugat ("Occident") – the most distinguished literary magazine of the time –which from 1928 regularly featured his articles and poems. His first book (Nehéz Föld) was also published by Nyugat in 1928.

He made friends with Attila József, László Németh, Lőrinc Szabó József Erdélyi, János Kodolányi and Péter Veres, at the time the leading talents of his generation.

In 1931 he married his first wife, Irma Juvancz, a physical education teacher, whom he later divorced.

Illyés was invited to the Soviet Union in 1934 to take part in the 1st Congress of the Soviet Writers' Union where he met André Malraux and Boris Pasternak. From that year he also participated in the editorial work of the review Válasz (Answer), the forum of the young "népi" writers.

He was one of the founding members of the March Front (1937 – 1939), a left-wing and anti-fascist movement. Subsequently, he was invited to the editorial board of Nyugat and became a close friend of its editor, the post-symbolist poet and writer Mihály Babits.

== War years ==
During World War II, Illyés was nominated editor-in-chief of Nyugat following the death of Mihály Babits. Having been refused by the authorities to use the name Nyugat for the magazine, he continued to publish the review under a different title: Magyar Csillag ("Hungarian Star").

In 1939 he married Flóra Kozmutza, with whom he had a daughter, Mária.

After the Nazi invasion of Hungary in March 1944, Illyés had to go into hiding along with László Németh, both being labelled anti-Nazi intellectuals.

== After World War II ==
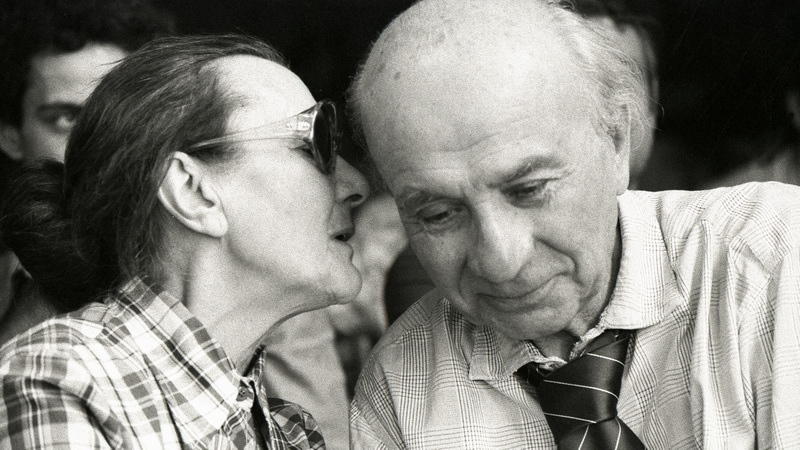
Gyula Illyés with his wife in 1979

He became a member of the parliament of Hungary in 1945, and one of the leaders of the left-wing National Peasant Party. He withdrew from public life in 1947 as the communist takeover of government was approaching. He was a member of the Hungarian Academy of Sciences from 1945 to 1949. He directed and edited the review Válasz from 1946 to 1949.

Although Gyula lived a reclusive life in Tihany and Budapest until the early 1960s, his poetry, prose, theater plays and essays continued to impact Hungarian public and literary life.

On 2 November 1956, during the Hungarian revolution of 1956, he published his famous poem, which was not allowed to be republished in Hungary until 1986: "One sentence on tyranny" is a long poem written in 1950.

From the early 1960s he continued to express political, social and moral issues all through his work, but the main themes of his poetry remain love, life and death. Active until his death in April 1983, he published poems, dramas, essays and parts of his diary. His work as a translator is also considerable.

He translated from many languages, French being the most important, but – with the help of rough translations – his volume of translations from the ancient Chinese classics remains a milestone.

== Works ==
In his poetry, Illyés was a spokesman for the oppressed peasant class. Typical is "People of the puszta", A puszták népe, 1936. His later work is marked by a more open universality, as well as an appeal for national and individual liberty.

=== Poetry ===
- Nehéz föld (1928)
- Sarjúrendek (1931)
- Három öreg (1932)
- Hősökről beszélek (1933)
- Ifjúság (1934)
- Szálló egek alatt (1935)
- Rend a romokban (1937)
- Külön világban (1939)
- Egy év (1945)
- Szembenézve (1947)
- Két kéz (1950)
- Kézfogások (1956)
- Új versek (1961)
- Dőlt vitorla (1965)
- Fekete-fehér (1968)
- Minden lehet (1973)
- Különös testamentum (1977)
- Közügy (1981)
- Táviratok (1982)
- A Semmi közelit (2008)

=== Prose ===
- Oroszország (1934)
- Petőfi (1936). Trans G. F. Cushing (Corvina, 1973)
- Puszták népe (1936). People of the Puszta, trans. G. F. Cushing (Chatto & Windus, 1971; revised 1979)
- Magyarok (1938)
- Ki a magyar? (1939)
- Lélek és kenyér (1939)
- Csizma az asztalon (1941)
- Kora tavasz (1941)
- Mint a darvak (1942)
- Hunok Párisban (1946)
- Franciaországi változatok (1947)
- Hetvenhét magyar népmese (1953)
- Balaton (1962)
- Ebéd a kastélyban (1962)
- Petőfi Sándor (1963)
- Ingyen lakoma (1964)
- Szives kalauz (1966)
- Kháron ladikján (1969)
- Hajszálgyökerek (1971)
- Beatrice apródjai (1979)
- Naplójegyzetek, 1–8 (1987–1995)

=== Theater ===
- A tü foka (1944)
- Lélekbúvár (1948)
- Ozorai példa (1952)
- Fáklyaláng (1953)
- Dózsa György (1956)
- Kegyenc (1963)
- Különc (1963)
- Tiszták (1971)

=== Children's books ===
- Once Upon a Time: Forty Hungarian Folk Tales (Corvina, 1970)
- The Prince and His Magic Horse (Corvina, 1987). Adaptations by Elek Benedek and Gyula Illyés.
- The Tree That Reached the Sky: Hungarian Folktales (Corvina, 1988). Adaptations by Elek Benedek and Gyula Illyés.

=== Compilations in English ===
- A Tribute to Gyula Illyés (Occidental Press, 1968). Ed. Thomas Kabdebo and Paul Tabori. Includes 34 poems by Gyula Illyés translated by D. Bell and others.
- Selected Poems (Chatto & Windus, 1971). Ed. Thomas Kabdebo and Paul Tabori.
- 29 Poems (Maecenas, 1996), Trans. István Tótfalusi.
- What You Have Almost Forgotten: Selected Poems (Kortárs, 1999). Trans. foreword and ed. William Jay Smith with Gyula Kodolányi.
- Charon's Ferry: Fifty Poems (Northwestern University Press, 2000). Trans. Bruce Berlind.

=== In anthologies and periodicals ===
- Poems for the Millennium, (ed. Jerome Rothenberg) 2000
- Arion, essays and poems, several issues
- The New Hungarian Quarterly and the Hungarian Quarterly, several issues
- Icarus 6 (Huns in Paris, trans. by Thomas Mark)
- Homeland in the Heights (ed. Bertha Csilla, An anthology of Post-World War II. Hungarian Poetry, Budapest (2000)
