= Mihály Babits =

Hungarian poet, writer and translator

Mihály Babits de Szentistván
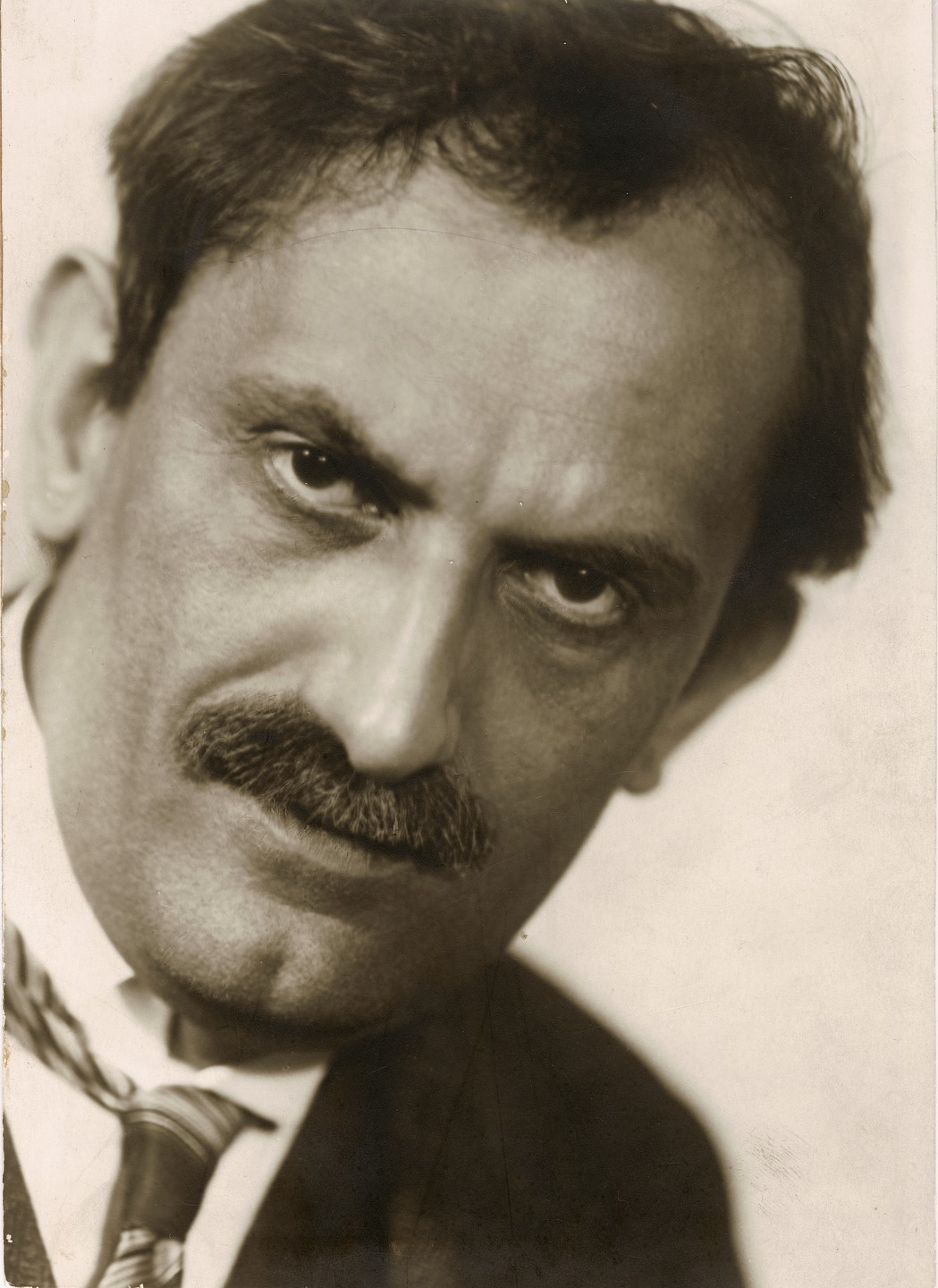
- Babits in 1940
- Born: 26 November 1883; Szekszárd, Austria-Hungary
- Died: 4 August 1941 (aged 57); Budapest, Hungary
- Resting place: Fiumei Road Cemetery, Budapest
- Education: Eötvös Loránd University
- Occupations: Poet; novelist; translator; literary historian; esperantist
- Spouse: Ilona Tanner (pen name: Sophie Török)
- Relatives: Mother: Auróra Kelemen; Father: Mihály Babits
- Writing career
- Period: 1900–1941
- Genres: Poetry, Short stories, Novels; Literary history Essays, lyric poetry
- Notable works: The Divine Comedy* (Hungarian translation) *The Book of Jonah* (*Jónás könyve*) *A gólyakalifa* (*The Stork Caliph*)

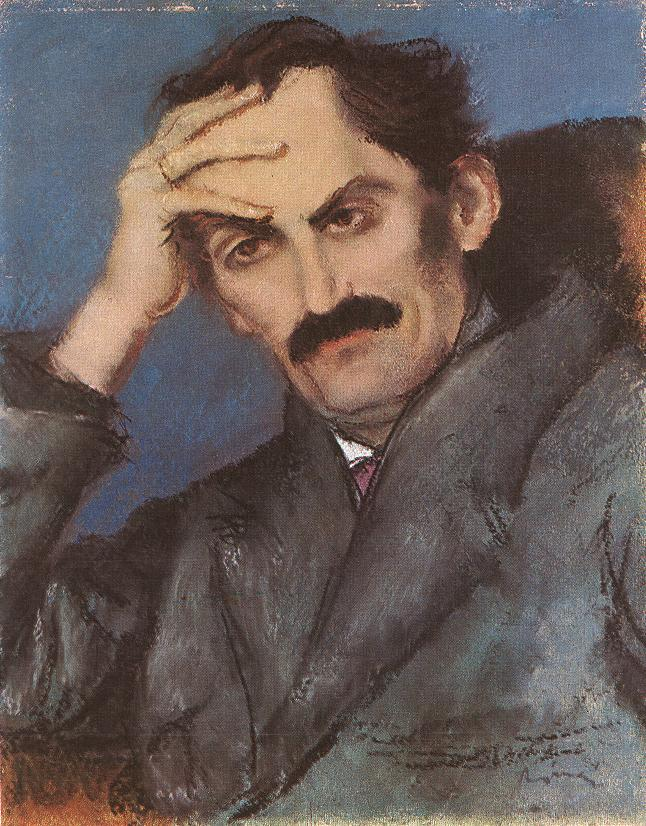
Portrait painting by József Rippl-Rónai

Mihály László Ákos Babits (Szekszárd, November 26, 1883 – Budapest, August 4, 1941) was a Hungarian poet, writer, literary historian, and translator. He was a prominent figure in early 20th-century Hungarian literature, a key member of the first generation of the literary journal Nyugat, and a corresponding member of the Hungarian Academy of Sciences (1940). He was married to writer Sophie Török (Ilona Tanner) and was the stepfather of Ildikó Babits.

== Early life and education ==
Mihály Babits was born in Szekszárd on November 26, 1883. His father, Mihály Babits Sr. (1844–1898), was a court judge who was later appointed to the Budapest Court of Appeal and subsequently relocated to Pécs in 1891 due to judicial decentralization. His mother, Auróra Kelemen, was a well-read woman who loved poetry and knew Pushkin's Eugene Onegin and other classic works by heart. He was related to lawyer Dezső Buday and was a distant cousin of Ede Szigligeti through his mother's side. He had three siblings: Angelika Irén Sarolta, Olga, and István.

Babits began his elementary schooling in Pest, but moved to Pécs with his family in 1891 at the age of eight. He attended the inner-city elementary school in Pécs while living as a paying guest with his maternal uncle, Dr. Mihály Kelemen. From September 1893, he attended the eight classes of the Cistercian Gymnasium. Following his father's death during his fifth year of gymnasium, his mother and younger siblings returned to Szekszárd to live with his maternal grandfather, József Kelemen, under the care of grandmother Innocentia Rácz. Babits stayed behind in Pécs, living under the care of his uncle Mihály as a paying guest so he could finish his studies at the Cistercian Gymnasium, where he graduated in 1901.

== Education and teaching career ==
After graduating from high school, Babits entered the Faculty of Humanities at Pázmány Péter University in Budapest, majoring in Hungarian and French (later replacing French with Latin). During László Négyesy’s famous stylistic exercise classes, he befriended fellow writers Gyula Juhász and Dezső Kosztolányi. He ultimately earned his teaching degree in Latin and Hungarian.

From the turn of the century, Babits wrote poetry, though he did not publish right away. He worked as a secondary school teacher in Baja, Szekszárd, Újpest, Pest, and Szeged (1906–1908). He later taught in Fogaras, and between 1911 and 1916 at the Könyves Kálmán Gymnasium in Újpest, a civil service gymnasium in Budapest, and finally at the Mihály Munkácsy Street Gymnasium. His early works were published in the Nagyvárad-based anthology A Holnap ("Tomorrow") in 1908.

== Literary career and Nyugat ==
Babits published his first poetry volume, Levelek Iris koszorújából ("Wreaths of Iris"), in 1909, followed by his second volume, Herceg, hátha megjön a tél is ("Prince, What If Winter Comes?"), in 1911. In 1913, he wrote his first novel, A gólyakalifa ("The Stork Caliph"), which was published in 1916.

Around 1913, Babits embarked on his monumental translation of Dante Alighieri’s Divine Comedy from the original ancient Italian: the Inferno appeared in 1913, the Purgatorio in 1920, and the Paradiso in 1923. For his translation work, he was honored by the Italian state and received the San Remo Prize, traveling to Sanremo in 1940 to collect it.

In 1915, during the second year of World War I, the publication of his love poem Játszottam a kezével ("I Played with Her Hands") sparked controversy; he was accused of unpatriotism and lost his teaching position. His third poetry collection, Recitativ, was published in 1916.

Babits took an active role in literary institutions: he became vice president of the Vörösmarty Academy upon its formation in 1918 and its president in 1925. In 1930, he became a full member of the Kisfaludy Society. From February 1920 until his exclusion, he was a full member of the Petőfi Society. He served as a senior editor (főmunkatárs) of Nyugat and later editor-in-chief (főszerkesztő) from 1929 onward, cementing his role as a defining director of Hungary's premier literary journal. For a brief period in 1919, he also served as a university professor until the fall of the Hungarian Soviet Republic.

From 1927 onward, Babits worked as a curator of the Baumgarten Foundation, granting him substantial influence over Hungarian literary life. He also contributed to the Literary Lexicon edited by Marcell Benedek in 1927.

== Personal life and later years ==
Following a brief romantic relationship between 1919 and 1920 with Berta Boncza (Csinszka), the widow of Endre Ady, Babits married Ilona Tanner (who wrote under the pen name Sophie Török)—who had previously been the fiancée of his secretary and co-tenant Lőrinc Szabó—on January 15, 1921, in Budapest. In 1928, they secretly adopted Babits's wife's sister's child, Ildikó Babits, whom he raised as his own until his death.

In 1924, Babits purchased a summer house in Előhegy, Esztergom, where he spent considerable time and wrote many of his major works. He became a central figure in Esztergom's cultural life and a founding member of the Balassa Society. His summer home hosted numerous prominent writers, poets, and artists who signed his famous "autograph wall" (now preserved as the Mihály Babits Memorial House).

In his later years, Babits's natural pessimism deepened when he was diagnosed with laryngeal cancer. In 1938, he underwent laryngeal surgery, which left him unable to speak; thereafter, he communicated with others through a conversation notebook (beszélgetőfüzet). That same year, he published Jónás könyve ("The Book of Jonah"). From 1937 until his death, he lived in his apartment on Attila út next to the Vérmező park. He died on August 4, 1941, at the Siesta Sanatorium on Kékgolyó Street in Budapest. He is buried in the Kerepesi Cemetery alongside his wife, beneath a monument sculpted by Béni Ferenczy.

== Poetry and literary style ==
Babits stood at the vanguard of Hungarian lyric poetry for decades, distinguished by intellectual depth, stylistic diversity, and a polished versification culture.

- Early Period: He initially sought to establish impersonal lyricism. Works such as his early collection Levelek Iris koszorújából reflect the fast-moving, multi-colored nature of Iris (the Greek goddess of the rainbow and messenger), symbolizing the poet's role in guiding humanity. Key early poems include In Horatium and A lírikus epilógja ("The Lyricist's Epilogue").
- Philosophical Poetry: Babits incorporated philosophical views inspired by Henri Bergson, distinguishing between objective (measurable) and subjective (lived) time, where the past lives on within the present ("creative time"). An exemplar of this style is Esti kérdés ("Evening Question").
- Anti-War Poetry: A staunch opponent of war from the onset of World War I, Babits wrote powerful anti-war verse, including Húsvét előtt ("Before Easter", which he publicly recited at the Music Academy in March 1916) and Fortissimo. His poem Fortissimo, in which he questioned God for failing to stop the devastation of the war, led to legal proceedings against him for religious offense. Despite such controversies, his worldview remained fundamentally Catholic.
- Island and Sea (Sziget és tenger): Following World War I, national tragedies and personal illness darkened his poetry. The title volume reflects a self-isolation from the outside world, using the "island" as a symbol for the artist seeking peaceful solitude and idyll. His style simplified and classicized while embracing social sensitivity and the defense of humanity. Key poems from this era include A gazda bekeríti házát ("The Farmer Fences His House"), Cigány a siralomházban ("Gypsy in Death Row"), Mint különös hírmondó ("Like a Special Messenger"), Ősz és tavasz között ("Between Autumn and Spring"), and Jónás könyve ("The Book of Jonah").

As a poeta doctus (learned poet) among the Nyugat circle, Babits valued cultural tradition while constantly experimenting with new verse forms—handling ancient meters, accented Hungarian rhythms, and modern metric poetry with equal mastery. Beyond poetry, his legacy includes profound essays, reviews of European literature, and experimental prose. His most notable prose work is the family novel Halálfiai ("Sons of Death"), and his final novel, Elza pilóta vagy a tökéletes társadalom ("Pilot Elza, or the Perfect Society", 1933), is an anti-utopia depicting a world locked in perpetual war.

== Legacy and memorials ==
Mihály Babits remains an iconic pillar of Hungarian literature:

- Miklós Radnóti dedicated the poem Csak csont és bőr és fájdalom, Babits Mihály halálára ("Only Skin and Bone and Pain, On the Death of Mihály Babits") to his memory.
- In October 1941, a memorial volume edited by Gyula Illyés was published in 2,000 numbered copies.
- Numerous streets, schools, memorial plaques, and statues honor him across Hungary, including a memorial park and statues in Budapest, Esztergom (where the Mihály Babits Chamber Theatre was founded in May 2017), Szekszárd, and Pécs (where the university's practice gymnasium in Uránváros is named after him, alongside a bust sculpted by Miklós Borsos).
- In 2024, the minor planet 202790 Babits was named in his honor.
