= Lőrinc Szabó =

Hungarian poet and literary translator

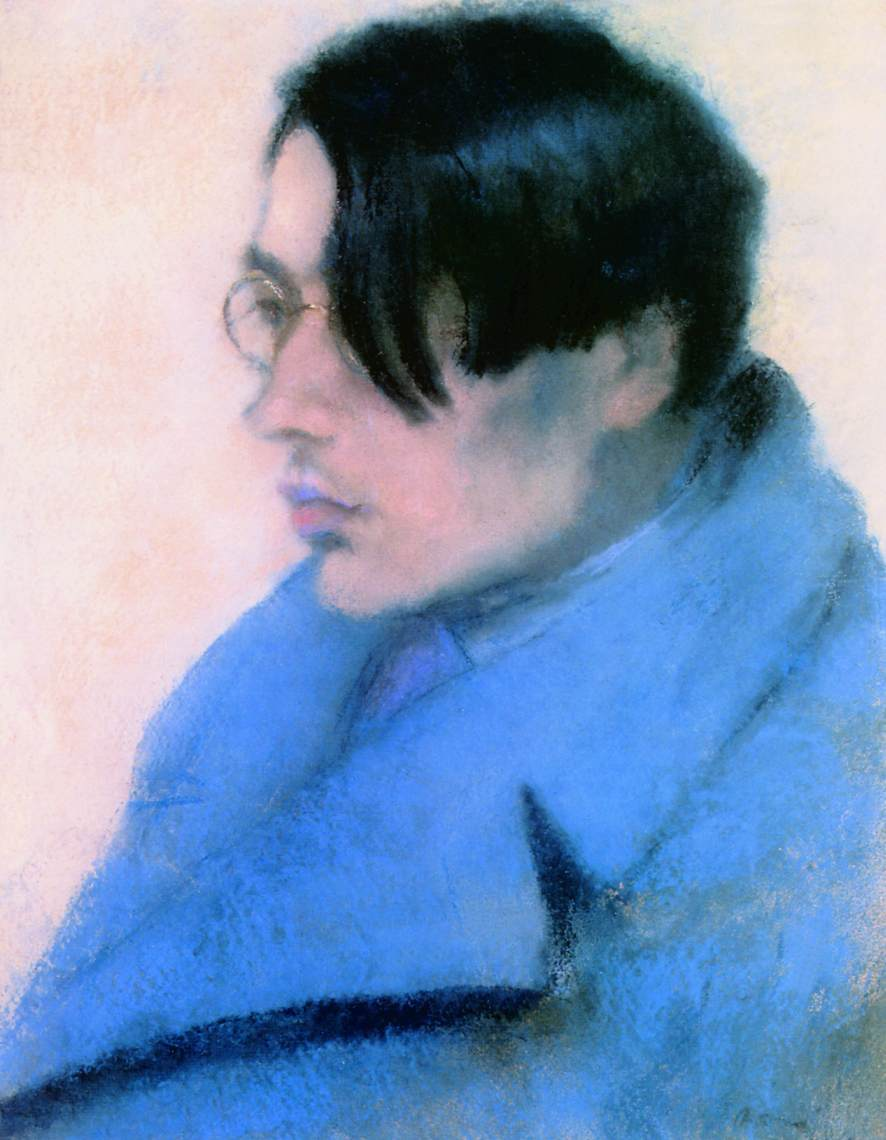
Lőrinc Szabó by József Rippl-Rónai (1923)

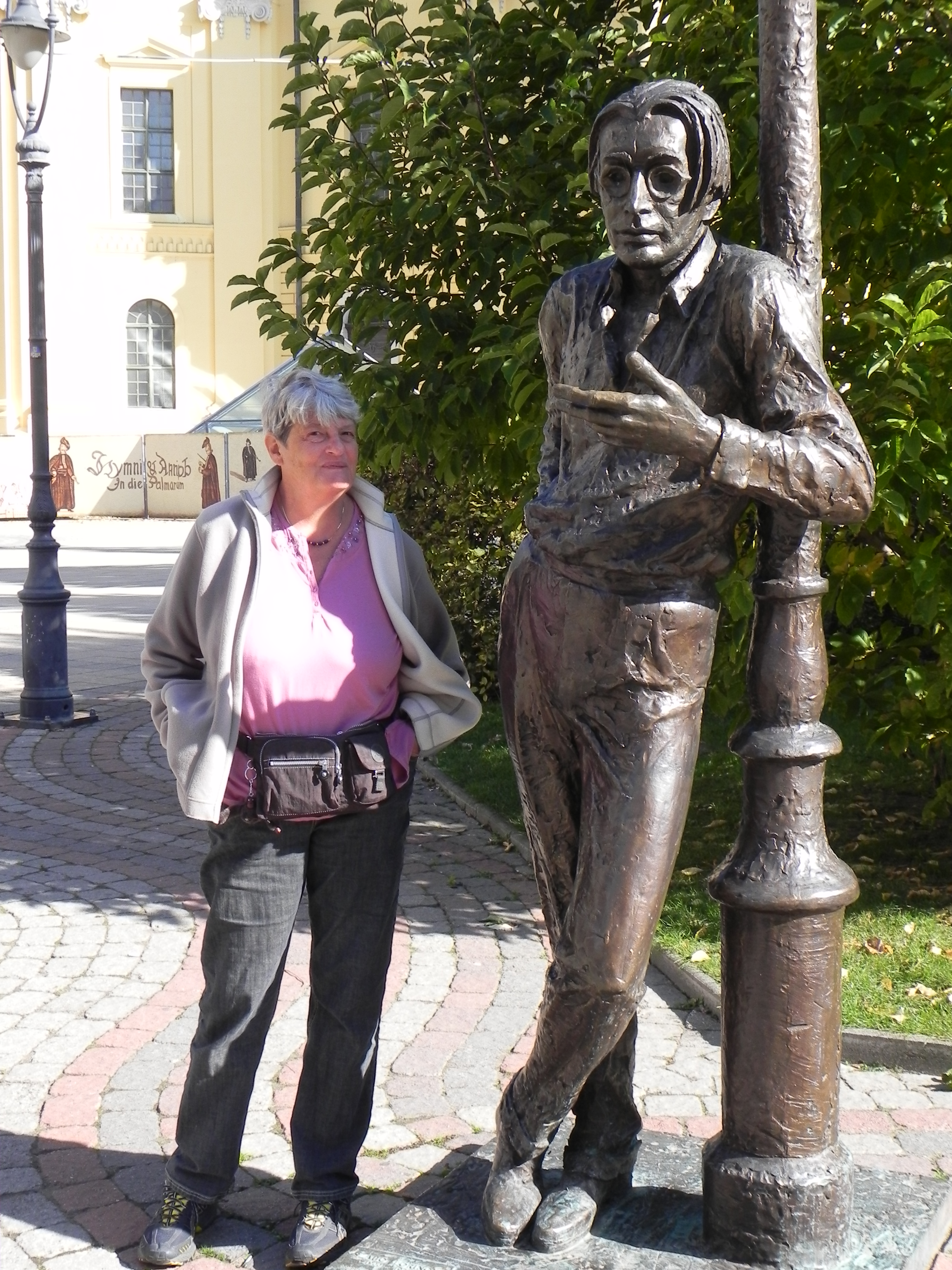
Lőrinc Szabó statue in Debrecen

Lőrinc Szabó de Gáborján (Hungarian: gáborjáni Szabó Lőrinc [ˈɡaːborjaːni ˈsɒboː ˈløːrint͡s]; Miskolc, 31 March 1900 – Budapest, 3 October 1957) was a Hungarian poet and literary translator.

== Biography ==
He was born in Miskolc as the son of an engine driver, Lőrinc Szabó sr., and Ilona Panyiczky. The family moved to Balassagyarmat when he was 3 years old. He attended school in Balassagyarmat and Debrecen. He studied at the ELTE in Budapest where he befriended Mihály Babits. He didn't finish his studies; instead he began to work for the literary periodical Az Est in 1921, shortly after he married Klára Mikes, the daughter of Lajos Mikes. He worked there until 1944. Between 1927 and 1928 he was a founder and editor of the periodical Pandora.

His first published poems appeared in the 1920s in the Nyugat ("The West"). His first book of poetry was published in 1922 under the title Föld, erdő, Isten ("Earth, Forest, God") and received considerable success. He got the Baumgarten Award in 1932, 1937 and 1943. As a translator, he translated several works of Shakespeare (Timon of Athens in 1935, As You Like It in 1938, Macbeth in 1939, Troilus and Cressida in 1948); Coleridge's Ancient Mariner and Kubla Khan, Baudelaire's Les Fleurs du mal (together with Babits and Árpád Tóth); François Villon's Grand Testament, Molière's L'École des femmes, Goethe's The Sorrows of Young Werther, Thomas Hardy's Tess of the d'Urbervilles, and works of Verlaine, Tyutchev, Pushkin, Krylov, Kleist, Mörike, Nietzsche, George, Rilke, Benn and Weinheber.

He fought in World War II, met Gyula Gömbös and at a literary congress at Lillafüred he emphasized the beauty of war poetry. In 1942 Lőrinc Szabó joined the "Europäische Schriftstellervereinigung" (i.e. European Writers' League) which had been founded by Joseph Goebbels. Today his correspondence with its head secretary Carl Rothe shows their close friendship. Szabó became the speaker of Hungarian section of the European Writers' League after József Nyírő and published articles in the organisation's magazine "Europäische Literatur" (i.e. European Literature).

This led to him being considered right-wing, and because of this, after the war he was left out of cultural life and could publish only translations, not his own works. His importance was recognised only shortly before his death, when he received the Kossuth Prize. He died of a heart attack.

== Poetry ==
Several of his poems were written to his children Lóci and Klári, while in other poems he remembers his own childhood.

In 1950 his long-time paramour Erzsébet Korzáti died by suicide. His sonnet cycle The 26th Year was written in her memory. it was published in 1957.

== Books of poetry ==
- Föld, erdő, Isten (Earth, Forest, God, 1922)
- Kalibán (Caliban, 1923)
- Fény, fény, fény (Light, Light, Light, 1926)
- A Sátán műremekei (Masterpieces of Satan, 1926)
- Te meg a világ (You and the World, 1932)
- Különbéke (Separate Peace, 1936)
- Harc az ünnepért (Fight for the Holiday, 1938)
- Régen és most (Then and Now, 1943)
- Tücsökzene (Cricket Song, 1947)
- A huszonhatodik év (The 26th Year, 1957)
