= Casey Means =

American wellness influencer, author, and former physician (born 1987)

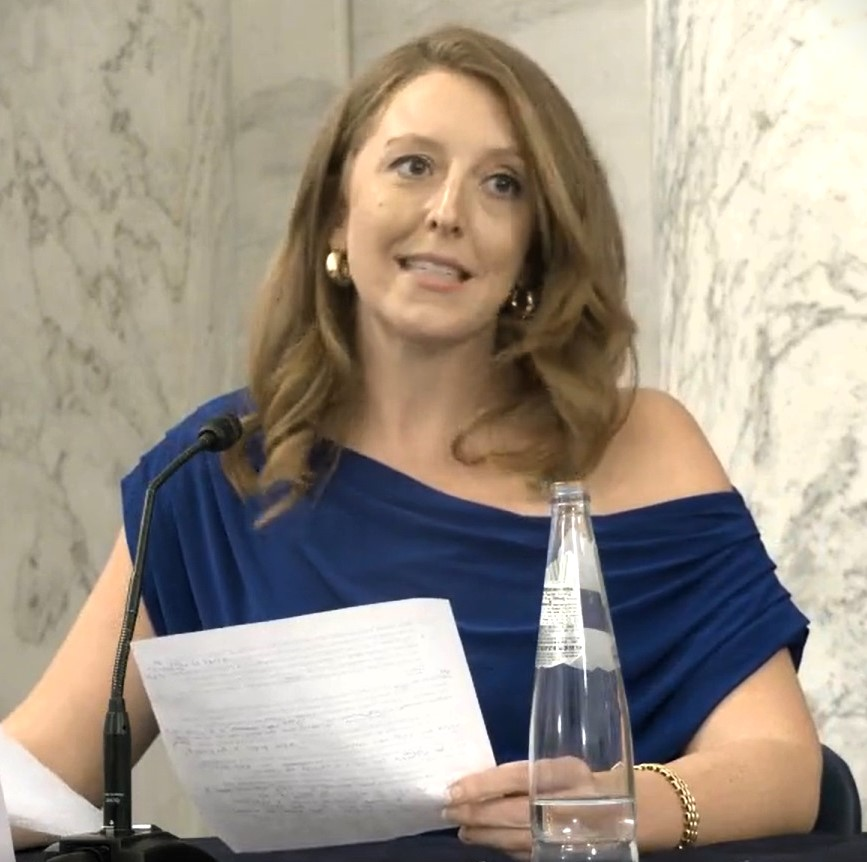
- Means in 2024
- Born: Paula Casey Means; September 24, 1987 (age 39)
- Education: Stanford University (BS, MD)
- Relatives: Calley Means (brother)

Paula Casey Means (born September 24, 1987), known as Casey Means, is an American medical doctor, author, and entrepreneur.

Means graduated from the Stanford University School of Medicine in 2014. She pursued an ENT surgical residency at Oregon Health and Science University but dropped out of the program in 2018.

Although Means was educated as a physician, she does not have an active medical license. She previously operated a functional medicine practice in Portland. She is considered a leader of the Make America Healthy Again (MAHA) movement along with her brother, Calley Means, who is also her co-author and business partner. On May 7, 2025, President Donald Trump nominated her as surgeon general, following his withdrawal of his earlier nominee, Janette Nesheiwat. Trump withdrew Means's nomination in April 2026, replacing her with Nicole Saphier.

== Early life and education ==
Born Paula Casey Means on September 24, 1987, Means shared her full birth name in a podcast interview, stating that she was named after Paul the Apostle, but legally dropped her given name after graduating from medical school. She is the first daughter of Grady and Gayle Means; Grady served as an assistant to U.S. Vice President Nelson Rockefeller, worked on health and human welfare issues at the Department of Health, Education, and Welfare, and was a managing partner at PriceWaterhouseCoopers. Gayle died of pancreatic cancer during the COVID-19 pandemic, encouraging her children to resolve "broken health incentives" in the U.S.

After graduating from the Madeira School in 2005, Means attended Stanford University, where she graduated with honors with a bachelor's degree in human biology in 2009. She then earned her Doctor of Medicine (M.D.) degree from the Stanford University School of Medicine in 2014 and was inducted into the Gold Humanism Honor Society. According to a statement by the medical school: "during her time at Stanford, Means demonstrated a strong commitment to comprehensive patient care, published peer-reviewed articles and held a leadership role in the Arbor Free Clinic, which provides care to underserved populations".

After graduating from medical school, Means started a residency in the Department of Otolaryngology-Head and Neck Surgery of Oregon Health and Science University (OHSU) with the aim of becoming an ENT surgeon. During her studies, she held various research positions (at the NIH, New York University, and OHSU). Six months before the end of the five-year program, she dropped out of her surgical residency, due to self-reported stress and her claim of having become disillusioned with the state of healthcare in the United States.

== Career ==
=== Medical practice ===
In January 2019, Means established Means Health, a functional medical practice and wellness consulting business, in Portland, Oregon. She was granted a medical license from the Oregon Medical Board in December 2018, but it has been inactive since 2024.

=== Teaching appointments ===
In 2022, Means served as a lecturer in courses on subjects relating to food and health at Stanford, teaching graduate and undergraduate students there.

=== Businesses ===
After leaving her surgical residency, Means founded Levels, a health technology company that sells wearable glucose monitors and apps to track bodily metrics. As of 2024, Means was reportedly serving as its chief medical officer.

In May 2025, Gregory Svirnovskiy of Politico reported that Means' website states she is an investor "and/or" adviser in Truemed, a company Calley Means, her brother, founded, that "employs doctors who sign off on the medical necessity of fitness and nutrition programs and advanced health tech so customers can get a tax break".

Means also has capitalized on sponsorships from dietary supplements, creams, teas, and other products appearing on her social media accounts.

=== Writing ===
Means and her brother, Calley Means, co-wrote a medically related book titled, Good Energy: The Surprising Connection Between Metabolism and Limitless Health, which was published by Penguin-Random House in 2024. As described in review by physician and public health professional Joseph E. Scherger, writing for the journal of the Society of Teachers of Family Medicine:

...Means describes... all food becom[ing] energy in the body, converted by the mitochondria [of our bodies' cells] for different purposes. Good energy [comes from] food that nourishes us in positive ways. Bad energy, which occupies much of the book, [comes from] food that results in metabolic dysfunction and a variety of health problems. Good energy... from the food of the natural world... [is] unprocessed, [and] nurtures our metabolism. Bad energy comes from ultraprocessed foods, sugars, and inflammatory proteins and fats.

Scherger notes that, through the book, the Meanses are "on a mission to eliminate bad energy from [the diets of] as many people as possible." Overall, Scherger reviews the book positively, stating, "Good Energy is an excellent book for a lifestyle medicine book club and may be recommended for patients wanting good nutritional advice. It is well worth reading." Jessica Winter, The New Yorker family, education, and reproductive rights reporter, criticized the work, describing the Means' book as "a memoir, a quasi-anti-establishment screed, and an orthorexic diet guide" advancing core positions of the MAHA movement:

The first is that Big Food and Big Pharma are incentivized to make and keep us sick. The second is that many conventional medicines and interventions do little to improve our health, and often worsen it; ... And, third, that most maladies can be prevented or treated through one's own ascetic diet and life-style choices.

== Surgeon General nomination ==
Through her social media impact and close association with Robert F. Kennedy Jr., Means is considered one of the leaders of the Make America Healthy Again movement. Means and her brother, Calley, served as close advisers for Kennedy's 2024 presidential campaign, helping to negotiate his eventual endorsement of Donald Trump. By October 2024, she had been considered as a potential appointee to lead a food and health agency in Trump's second presidency, according to The Washington Post. The Wall Street Journal wrote the following month that she had been mentioned by Kennedy, Trump's then-nominee for United States Secretary of Health and Human Services, as a potential nominee for Surgeon General of the United States or Commissioner of Food and Drugs, with Politico adding that she was also being considered for nomination as Assistant Secretary for Health. Means and her brother, Calley, served as advisers to Kennedy by that month.

By January 2025, the Meanses appeared unlikely to join the Department of Health and Human Services, but remained connected to Kennedy. On May 7, the Trump administration began planning to withdraw Janette Nesheiwat's nomination as surgeon general after her résumé was questioned and Laura Loomer, a far-right social media political activist and conspiracy theorist, stated that Nesheiwat was "not ideologically aligned" with Trump. Hours later, Trump announced that he would nominate Means as surgeon general. Trump said he did not know Means but nominated her based on Kennedy's recommendation.

In addition to proponents of evidence-based medicine, Means' nomination has been criticized by anti-vaccination campaigners who favored health influencer Kelly Victory, such as Americans for Health Freedom's Mary Talley Bowden, Steve Kirsch, and Suzanne Humphries. Loomer was sharply critical of Means' nomination, calling her a "total crack pot". Kennedy's 2024 running mate Nicole Shanahan was also critical of the nomination, claiming there was an understanding that Means would not play a role in the Trump administration. On July 31, 2025, Politico reported that Means's nomination was stalled in the Senate Committee on Health, Education, Labor and Pensions (HELP), pending her submission of financial disclosure and ethics paperwork.

Means's scheduled confirmation hearing before the HELP committee, which was to be the first such hearing held virtually, was postponed on October 30, 2025, after she went into labor. On January 3, 2026, Means's nomination expired per Senate rules, but Trump renominated her 10 days later. She appeared before the HELP committee on February 25, 2026. On March 25, 2026, the Associated Press reported that her nomination was stalled in the Senate stemming from her testimony over vaccines and other health topics.

In April 2026, Trump withdrew Means's nomination.

== Published works ==
=== Books ===
- Means, Casey; Means, Calley (2024). Good Energy: The Surprising Connection Between Metabolism and Limitless Health. London, England and New York, NY: Avery-PenguinRandomHouse. ISBN 9780593712641.

=== Journal articles ===
Means published seven scholarly articles in medical journals during her training years, most from Oregon Health and Science University related to her post-graduate specialisation in otorhinolaryngology, but also from Stanford Medicine and Means Health in Portland Oregon (the latter in Metabolism, see following), as well as articles in the areas of sleep studies and oncology—including in John Wiley & Sons' Head & Neck, in the journal, The Laryngoscope, and the International Journal of Pediatric Otorhinolaryngology, as well as in Cytometry. Part A, Metabolism: Clinical and Experimental, and others.

== Views ==
After withdrawing from her surgical residency, Means became a practitioner of functional medicine. Her views have been criticized by science communicator Jonathan Jarry of the McGill Office for Science and Society, who wrote that "[Means] is not a metabolic health expert" and "theories claiming to have found a single cause for all diseases never pan out". Jarry has referred to her book as an example of "scienceploitation", accusing her of using preliminary research on mitochondrial dysfunction to promote dubious products or policy. Means has been noted to "blam[e] the ultra-processed food system for much of the chronic disease in America", and has had ascribed to her the view that the origin of most diseases lie in our exposures to ultra-processed foods and environmental factors, to a lack of sunlight, and to lack of exercise.

=== Medical error, vaccination, and other issues ===
Means has repeated FDA Commissioner Marty Makary's claim that the third leading cause of death in the United States is medical error (i.e., death "from medical care itself"), a claim that has been criticized by experts as "self-serving, irresponsible sensationalism", and based on "incredible numbers borne out of unreliable calculations."

In addition, Means has criticized the National Childhood Vaccine Injury Act, and, per New York magazine, she has "raised long-settled questions about the safety and efficacy of vaccines despite not representing herself as an anti-vaxxer".

Means has referred to infertility as a crisis, and has been critical of hormonal contraception on both medical grounds, questioning how it affects women's health, and moral grounds, referring to it as a "disrespect of life".

Means has spoken in support of raw milk, stating, "When it comes to a question like raw milk, I want to be free to form a relationship with a local farmer, understand his integrity, look him in the eyes, pet his cow, and then decide if I feel safe to drink the milk from his farm."
