= Agenda 47 =

Policy platform of the 2024 Donald Trump campaign

Logo

Agenda 47 (styled by the Trump campaign as Agenda47) is the campaign manifesto of President Donald Trump, which details policies that would be implemented upon his election as the 47th president of the United States. (Note: Trump was previously the 45th president, but the precedent set by Grover Cleveland is that a nonconsecutive second term means a new presidential number.) Agenda 47 is a collection of formal policy plans of Donald Trump, many of which would rely on executive orders and significantly expand executive power.

The platform has been criticized for its approach to climate change and public health; its legality and feasibility; and the risk that it will increase inflation. Some columnists have described it as fascist or authoritarian. In September 2024, Trump's campaign launched a tour called "Team Trump Agenda 47 Policy Tour" to promote Agenda 47.

== Overview ==
Agenda 47 is Donald Trump's 2024 presidential campaign formal policy plans. According to the Trump campaign, it is "the only official comprehensive and detailed look at what President Trump will do if he returns to the White House". It is presented on the campaign's website in a series of videos with Trump outlining each proposal. According to Philip Bump, some Agenda 47 videos appeared scattershot and responsive to current events around early 2023. The proposals appeared to be aimed towards Republican primary voters and slowed down once his primary lead grew in April 2023, to the point where Philip Bump wrote in the Washington Post in June 2024 that neither Trump nor his campaign regularly brings up the plan, although, according to Phil Mattingly from CNN, it is "regularly featured in the scripted portions of his remarks at rallies".

In 2023, Trump campaign officials acknowledged the Project 2025 aligned well with Agenda 47; however, Trump repeatedly disclaimed it in 2024. As of June 2024, Project 2025 had reportedly caused some annoyance in the Trump campaign which had historically preferred fewer and more vague policy proposals to limit opportunities for criticism and maintain flexibility. Some commentators have argued that Project 2025 is the most detailed look at what a Trump administration would look like. Agenda 47 and Project 2025 share many themes and policies, including expanding presidential power such as through reissuing Schedule F, cuts to the Department of Education, mass deportations of illegal immigrants, the death penalty for drug dealers, and using the US National Guard in liberal cities with high crime rates or those that are "disorderly".

The plans include constructing "freedom cities" on empty federal land, investing in flying car manufacturing, introducing baby bonuses to encourage a baby boom, implementing protectionist trade policies, and over forty others. Seventeen of the policies that Trump says he will implement if elected would require congressional approval. Some of his plans are legally controversial, such as ending birthright citizenship, and may require amending the U.S. Constitution.

Many of the proposals are contentious. One Agenda 47 proposal would impose the death penalty on drug dealers and human traffickers, as well as placing Mexican cartels on the United States list of Foreign Terrorist Organizations. The campaign website's layout has changed. As of September 2024, there is a new section called "Platform," where a synthesis of the main policies can be found. (Note: The first capture of the "Platform" section in Archive.org dates from July 14, 2024.)

== Policies in detail ==
As of September 2024, the policies are detailed in 46 videos, the first one uploaded on December 15, 2022, and the last one on December 22, 2023. (Note: The number of videos is 46, but two of them, uploaded on different dates, are the same.) (Note: The layout of the website has changed. As of September 2024, the access to the list of videos is in the main page's lower section titled "I AM YOUR VOICE. AMERICA FIRST!" via clicking on the red button "Watch more videos".) The videos are usually accompanied by a transcription and often by complementary material regarding the policy in question, as exemplified by the proposition Agenda47: Rescuing America's Auto Industry from Joe Biden's Disastrous Job-Killing Policies, which contains links to reports and articles from entities such as the America First Policy Institute, The Heritage Foundation, and The Harris Poll, news articles from entities like Reuters, The American Oil & Gas Reporter, and Fox Business, and related propositions in the campaign website.

=== Economy ===
Propositions relating to the economy include:

- Restrictions on Chinese ownership of infrastructure in the United States, including energy, technology, telecommunications, farmland, natural resources, medical supplies, and other strategic national assets, preventing all future Chinese purchases, and forcing the Chinese to sell any current holdings.
- Ending "Joe Biden's war on American energy" and deregulating domestic production, getting out of the Paris Agreement, and issuing fast approvals to every oil infrastructure project presented to his administration.
- Universal baseline tariffs on most foreign products, which will increase incrementally if other countries manipulate their currency or "otherwise engage in unfair trading practices", and lowering taxes. Revoking China's Most Favored Nation trade status, gradually stopping all Chinese imports of essential goods, stopping American companies from investing in China, and banning federal contracts for any company that outsources to China.
- Decreasing trade deficits, especially with China.
- Not bailing out failing banks, but "unleash[ing] energy production, slash[ing] regulations", and repealing "Biden's tax hikes", to reduce inflation.
- Passing the "Trump Reciprocal Trade Act". If any country applies a certain percent tariff on American-made goods, the same tariff will be applied on theirs; the other countries "will have two choices – they'll get rid of their tariffs on us, or they will pay us hundreds of billions of dollars, and the United States will make an absolute FORTUNE." This is meant to help agricultural states and manufacturers.
- To "save America's auto industry from Joe Biden's radical Green New Deal policies", by terminating all of Biden's policies regarding emission regulations, fossil fuels, and electric vehicles, specifically the "mandates designed to force Americans into expensive electric cars", subsidies for "electric cars for rich people", and "DOUBLED CAFÉ standards". Also, asking Canada and Mexico for full compliance with the terms of USMCA regarding the amount of regional auto parts content in North American cars which reduction benefited China and other countries, ending delays in federal drilling permits and leases, and restoring the U.S. Strategic Petroleum Reserve. He promised "higher wages for auto workers"

Tariffs were a policy in Trump's first term, centered on China, and later extended to the European Union, Canada, and Mexico. They led to retaliatory tariffs imposed by the affected countries, and to a trade war with China, which "raised the price for items such as baseball hats, luggage, bicycles, TVs, sneakers, and a variety of materials used by American manufacturers." They also caused loss of jobs and hurt manufacturers and farmers. Treasury Secretary Janet Yellen said that "those tariffs on Chinese goods have “imposed more harm on consumers and businesses” than on China."

Trump's new economic proposals drew criticism from 16 Nobel prize-winning economists, the Wharton School (Trump's alma mater), Goldman Sachs, and Moody's Analytics, among others. Trump's campaign and supporters rebuked the laureates' critiques.

After his electoral victory, Trump enacted a series of steep tariffs affecting nearly all goods imported into the United States.

=== Education ===
- Cutting federal funding for any school or program teaching critical race theory or "gender ideology", directing the Departments of Justice and Education to open civil rights investigations into any school district that has engaged in race-based discrimination; also, "remov[ing] the radicals who have infiltrated the federal Department of Education" and "keep[ing] men out of women's sports."
- Creating a new way to certify teachers based on their patriotism, giving preferential funding and treatment to states and school districts that abolish teacher tenure for grades K through 12 and adopt merit pay, cutting the number of school administrators (specifically the ones in charge of diversity, equity, and inclusion (DEI)), and adopting direct election of school principals by the parents.
- "Reclaim[ing] our once great educational institutions from the radical Left" by using the college accreditation system; firing the "radical Left accreditors" and substituting them with new ones "who will impose real standards on colleges". The standards will include "defending the American tradition and Western civilization"; protecting free speech; eliminating "wasteful" administrative positions, specifically all the ones dealing with DEI; offering accelerated and low-cost degrees; providing job placement and career services; and implementing college entrance and exit exams to prove learning quality. Also, directing the Department of Justice to pursue federal civil rights cases against schools that "engage in racial discrimination"; the ones that persist in "discrimination under the guise of equity" will have their endowment taxed, and through budget reconciliation, "I will advance a measure to have them fined up to the entire amount of their endowment." Part of the seized funds will be used as restitution "for victims of these illegal and unjust policies".

According to The Nation, "Many experts in higher education have begun to sound the alarm that such actions may infringe on academic freedom and institutional autonomy – two cornerstones of American higher education", whereas Trump’s National Press Secretary Karoline Leavitt stated, "By increasing access to school choice, empowering parents to have a voice in their child's education, and supporting good teachers, President Trump will improve academic excellence for all students."

- "Ten principles for achieving great schools that lead to great jobs", by ensuring that instead of "indoctrinating young people with inappropriate racial, sexual, and political material", schools must refocus on preparing "children to succeed in the world of work". The principles are:
  1. "Restoring Parental Rights", specifically to control the education of their children. This includes being made aware of academic standards, updating on acts of violence, inspecting "professional development materials", being notified about guest speakers, reviewing the school's budget, knowing about bullying, health and mental health concerns, "to have the right to opt out of school healthcare services", and be immediately notified if any school employee "has worked to change their children’s name, pronouns, or understanding of his or her gender".
  2. "Great Principals and Great Teachers", i.e. empowering parents and local school boards to hire and fire principals and teachers.
  3. "Knowledge and Skills, Not CRT and Gender Indoctrination", i.e. teaching "reading, writing, math, science, arithmetic, and other truly useful subjects". This includes getting "the left's 'equity' agenda out of our classrooms."
  4. "Love of Country". This includes reinstating the 1776 Commission.
  5. "Freedom to Pray", i.e. "we will support bringing back prayer to our schools".
  6. "Safe, Secure, and Drug-Free", by "immediate expulsion for any student who harms a teacher or another student". This includes sending the "out-of-control troublemakers OUT of the classroom and INTO reform schools and corrections facilities", supporting "school districts that allow highly trained teachers to carry concealed weapons at school", and supporting federal funding to hire trained gun-owners as armed guards. Also, directing the "U.S. Food and Drug Administration to convene an independent outside panel to investigate whether transgender hormone treatments and ideology increase the risk of extreme depression, aggression, and violence. He will also look at whether common psychiatric drugs, as well as genetically engineered cannabis and other narcotics, are causing psychotic breaks". Additionally, immediate suspension or expulsion for illegal drug use or possession in school.
  7. "Universal School Choice". This includes "that parents can send their children to the public, private, or religious school that best suits" them.
  8. "Project-Based Learning", "to help train [the students] for meaningful work outside the classroom".
  9. "Internships and Work Experiences" for all students. This includes implementing "funding preferences for schools that actively work to help students secure internships, part-time work, and summer jobs".
  10. "Jobs and Career Counseling", provided by all schools. Also, closing the Department of Education, and sending all education matters back to the states.
- Supporting homeschooling, by allowing homeschool parents to use 529 education savings accounts to spend up to $10,000 a year per child, tax-free. Also, ensuring that every homeschooling family is "entitled to full access to the benefits available to non-homeschooled students – including participating in athletic programs, clubs, after school activities, educational trips, and more".
- Endowing the American Academy with funds collected by "taxing the large endowments of private universities plagued by antisemitism" (implicitly referring to the 2024 pro-Palestinian protests on university campuses). The American Academy's mission will be to make "a truly world-class education available to every American, free of charge, and do it without adding a single dime to the federal debt", covering all subjects and trades, online, for free, also "using study groups, mentors, industry partnerships, and the latest breakthrough in computing". According to the Trump campaign, the Academy will be strictly apolitical, it will compete directly with the university system by granting degree credentials recognized by the government and federal contractors, it will award the equivalent of a bachelor's degree, and it will allow people to complete an unfinished college education.

According to Politico, "[u]sing the federal government to create an entirely new educational institution aimed at competing with the thousands of existing schools would drastically reshape American higher education", adding that this policy would likely need U.S. Congress approval, and that it targets the over "40 million Americans who have some college but never completed their degree", similarly to some of the student debt relief efforts by the Biden administration, but differing in the source for its financing.

=== Expansion of presidential powers ===
Trump's plan to expand presidential powers is based largely on a controversial and not widely held interpretation of the constitution known as the unitary executive theory. The plan includes:

- "Dismantl[ing] the deep state and reclaim[ing] our democracy from Washington corruption", by firing government employees, reissuing Executive Order 13957 (Schedule F), "restoring the president's authority to fire rogue bureaucrats". Also, reforming FISA courts, declassifying and publishing "all documents on Deep State spying, censorship, and corruption", taking action against "government leakers", making every Inspector General's office independent and separated from the departments they oversee, establishing an independent auditing system to monitor the intelligence agencies, moving government positions out of Washington, banning federal employees from taking jobs at the companies they regulate, and "push" a constitutional amendment to impose term limits on members of Congress.

According to the Associated Press, the proposal of moving some 10,000 federal employees from Virginia, Maryland, and the District of Columbia: "it’s causing a lot of anxiety, a lot of discomfort within the workforce, as you are faced with these strong, negative, anti-federal worker stances and this uncertainty of what might happen to your job, your home and your livelihood." Larry Hogan, former Governor of Maryland, stated that the relocations, "would be devastating to the region, the state of Maryland and bad for the federal government." The measure is seen as retaliatory and damaging to the states' economy. Filipe Campante, a Bloomberg Distinguished professor at Johns Hopkins University, stated: "I think it is a positive factor for accountability that you have civil servants also operating as a check on political appointees, and this would be weakened by moving these people away from where the center of the government is, so I think from that perspective it would reduce accountability. Obviously, then, it depends on whether you think this accountability is good or not."

- Cutting federal regulations by restoring Executive Order 13771 and asking Congress to make it permanent. Implementing a regulatory budget, aiming at reducing the federal government every year. Requiring all government regulations to be posted publicly in a central database, failing which they will be made null and void. Signing a law to "ban bureaucrats from taking any enforcement action based on informal guidance alone". Bringing the independent regulatory agencies, such as the FCC and the FTC, "back under Presidential authority". Creating "an ultra-streamlined federal regulatory framework specifically for Freedom Cities". Requiring federal employees to pass a new Civil Service test about "Constitutional limited government", including command of due process rights, equal protection, free speech, religious liberty, federalism, the Fourth Amendment, and other constitutional limits on federal power.
- Stopping unnecessary government expenditure by restoring impoundment, challenging the Impoundment Control Act of 1974 in court, or getting Congress to overturn it. The consequent savings will be in the form of tax reductions, and this will stop inflation and reduce the deficit. Every federal agency will be ordered to identify the parts of their budgets that "can be saved through efficiencies and waste reduction using Impoundment". This will not include defense, Medicare, or Social Security; they will be strengthened with some of those funds.

The Washington Post has said that this policy "could upend the balance of power between the three branches of the federal government", "could provoke a dramatic constitutional showdown, with vast consequences for how the government operates", and that "legal scholars" say it "could violate the Constitution and usurp congressional authority by consolidating more power in the executive branch". It also stated that "unilaterally zero[ing] out any program he doesn't like, or whose recipient has angered him, regardless of Congress's instructions" would be illegal, even if Trump gets the Impoundment Control Act repealed. The New Republic called it a "fascist plan". On its part, The Hill stated that, on the contrary, impounding is "common sense", and "a key tool for the president to pursue U.S. foreign policy and protect national security".

=== Foreign affairs ===
- Negotiating an end to the Russian invasion of Ukraine in 24 hours. (Note: Both sources establish that this proposition was announced in a series of videos. The campaign website offers only one, without a verbatim transcription, which appears to be embedded from Rumble. The Forbes channel offers three consecutive messages, the first and last of which are the same. The words of those two messages approximately match the campaign website's text.)
- Reshuffling government employees in charge of foreign policy, namely "clean[ing] house of all of the warmongers and America-Last globalists in the Deep State, the Pentagon, the State Department, and the national security industrial complex."
- "The defense bureaucracy, the intelligence services, and all the rest need to be completely overhauled and reconstituted to fire the Deep Staters and put America First", and "reevaluating NATO's purpose and mission".
- Increasing military funding, asking "Europe to reimburse us for the cost of rebuilding the stockpiles sent to Ukraine", and increasing military recruitment by restoring "the proud culture and honor traditions of America's armed forces".

During the 2024 campaign, Trump developed his propositions, adding: sending troops to Mexico to attack cartel leadership and infrastructure (with the possibility of bombing it), seeking to deport all "resident aliens" who are Hamas sympathizers, and pulling out of the Paris Agreement.

After Trump's electoral victory, the possibilities of invading Mexico, annexing Canada, retaking the Panama Canal, and buying Greenland, or taking them by force, were discussed. Trump also declared his intent of changing the name of the Gulf of Mexico to Gulf of America.

=== Healthcare and social security ===
- Keeping Medicare and Social Security intact and cutting other federal expenses such as help to foreign countries, and eliminating "mass-releases of illegal aliens ..., left-wing gender programs from our military [and] climate extremism".
- Reinstating the ban on environmental, social, and governance (ESG) investments in 401(k)s, pensions, and retirement accounts via executive order, and working with Congress to enact a permanent ban.
- Establishing a commission of "independent minds who are not bought and paid for by Big Pharma" to investigate the rise in chronic illnesses and health problems, especially in children ("autism, auto-immune disorders, obesity, infertility, serious allergies, and respiratory challenges").

An increase in chronic conditions in children and youth has been observed. Yahoo! News observed that Trump does not mention vaccines in the video discussing this policy, but it was a dog-whistle to anti-vaccine voters, as he was facing Ron DeSantis during the primaries, and the possibility of having Robert F. Kennedy Jr. as a challenger for the presidency. On its part, Axios said that Trump's message could undermine public health, that its language was reminiscent of Robert Kennedy Jr., and that the mentions to Big Pharma appeared in other policies related to education, gender-affirming care, and dismantling the deep state.

Ever since, it was repeatedly reported that Trump said he would cut federal funds from schools with masks and vaccine mandates, raising concerns about whether he referred to COVID-19 exclusively or to all vaccines, since all 50 states and Washington, D.C. have laws requiring specific vaccines for students, including measles, rubella, chickenpox, tetanus, pertussis, and polio. Trump's spokespeople said it was only about COVID-19, for which no student vaccination mandates exist.

In July 2024, an accidentally leaked call from Trump to Kennedy showed the former president questioning the safety of childhood vaccines. It was also reported that Trump and Kennedy had been in conversations about Kennedy giving his endorsement to Trump in exchange for an appointment in his cabinet. In an interview with Chris Cuomo, Kennedy talked about having conversations with Trump, but denied that he was seeking an appointment. (Note: In the Last Week Tonight episode aired on August 4, 2024, John Oliver claimed that the show was informed by Kennedy's campaign of these talks, including the possibility of appointing Kennedy as Secretary of Health and Human Services.)

On August 23, Kennedy suspended his campaign and endorsed Trump. In a rally in Arizona on the same day, Trump presented Kennedy, and repeated his "pledge to establish a panel of top experts working with Bobby to investigate what is causing the decades-long increase in chronic health problems and childhood diseases, including auto-immune disorders, autism, obesity, infertility, and many more." Kennedy told how he got in contact with Trump via "safe food advocate" Calley Means, and said, "Our children are now the unhealthiest, sickest children in the world. Don't you want healthy children?"

After his electoral victory, Trump nominated Robert F. Kennedy Jr. to be his Secretary of Health and Human Resources; he also selected Dr. Mehmet Oz to be administrator for the Centers for Medicare and Medicaid Services (CMS), and Casey Means as Surgeon General of the United States.

- Attempting to reduce drug costs by signing an executive order telling "Big Pharma that we will only pay the best price they offer to foreign nations ... this will force Big Pharma to RAISE prices on foreign countries and REDUCE prices very substantially for American Patients".

JAMA Health Forum commented on the possible outcome of the 2024 election, saying that it "will have momentous consequences for the future of health care". After comparing the records of Trump and Biden regarding the high price of prescription drugs and health care services, it said, "[h]ow Trump would approach drug price negotiations if elected is unclear. Trump supported federal negotiation of drug prices during his 2016 campaign, however, as president, he did not pursue drug price negotiation and opposed a Democratic price negotiation plan. ... Even though Trump has been inconsistent in his positions on drug prices, his public comments suggest the possibility of bipartisan cooperation."

- Ending "Joe Biden's pharmaceutical shortages", returning the manufacture of essential drugs to the United States, and phasing in tariffs and import restrictions on China.

=== Immigration reforms ===
- "A total ban on Biden using taxpayer dollars to free illegal aliens – and criminal penalties for administrative noncompliance."
- Signing an executive order "making clear to federal agencies that under the correct interpretation of the law, going forward, the future children of illegal aliens will not receive automatic U.S. citizenship." The order will also end "birth tourism" and consequent "chain migration". At least one parent will have to be a citizen or a legal resident for the child to qualify for citizenship. This is based on the "clear meaning of the 14th Amendment, that U.S. Citizenship extends only to those both born in AND 'subject to the jurisdiction' of the United States". Therefore, children of undocumented immigrants "should not be issued passports, Social Security numbers, or be eligible for certain taxpayer funded welfare benefits", nor have the right to vote.
- Ending "welfare for illegal immigrants and shut down Joe Biden's abuse of parole authority". This includes reinstating the "action making illegals ineligible for public housing" and terminating "all work permits for illegal aliens". Also, demanding Congress to send a bill "blocking any future President from abusing his power to distribute welfare benefits in this manner".

CNN commented, "[s]hould Congress refuse to fund the operation, Trump could turn to a tactic used in his first term to secure more funding for a border wall – redirecting funds from the Pentagon, the source confirmed." After describing the record of Trump's immigration policies from the standpoint of healthcare, JAMA Health Forum said, "[they] had a chilling effect on access to care and benefits among immigrants, including those lawfully present ... Trump has continued these themes in his current campaign, saying that 'welfare is a gigantic magnet drawing people from all over the world.'" He has also promised mass deportations, especially in the context of the Springfield pet-eating hoax.

=== Infrastructure and urban planning ===
- Holding a contest to charter up to 10 new cities ("Freedom Cities") in undeveloped federal lands. Turning "forgotten communities into hives of industry". Lowering the cost of living for families, specifically, the cost of building a home and buying a new car. Helping young parents, by asking Congress to provide "baby bonuses". Challenging the governors of all 50 states to modernize and beautify cities and public spaces, and "building towering monuments to our true American heroes".

CNN criticized this policy for the lack of details of how would it be financed, "what 'baby bonuses' would amount to or who would qualify", and for how these plans differ from Democratic policies like the "enhanced child tax credit" whose extension beyond 2021 was blocked by Republicans.

- Investing in flying car manufacturing.
- Repealing Biden's 2021 reversal of Trump's 2020 reversal of the Affirmatively Furthering Fair Housing provision.
- Celebrating the 250th Anniversary of the Declaration of Independence by convening a task force called "Salute to America 250", in charge of coordinating with state and local governments to produce an entire year of festivities across the nation, starting on Memorial Day 2025 and continuing through July 4, 2026. Working with all governors to create the "Great American State Fair", a one-year exhibition featuring pavilions from all states, to be built in the Iowa State Fairgrounds. Hosting "Patriot Games", major sporting contests for high school athletes. Signing an executive order to bring back the National Garden of American Heroes, commissioning artists for the first 100 statues. Inviting international leaders and citizens to visit the United States, favoring the tourism industry. Asking American religious communities to pray for the nation and the people. "As we chart a course toward the next 250 years, let us come together and rededicate ourselves as one nation under God."

=== Journalism, information, and censorship ===
- "Shatter[ing] the left-wing censorship regime", i.e. labeling information as misinformation or disinformation, in the media or social networks, about subjects like the 2020 elections, Covid, and the "Biden Family's criminality". This will be achieved by banning every federal agency from performing that action, firing federal officials who have done it (and depriving them of their vote), investigating and prosecuting all parties involved, and curtailing federal economic support to universities that have done it.

During his term, Trump made false or misleading statements, which often were spread via social media, resulting in social media banning him after the events of January 6, 2021. Contemporary academic publications discussed freedom of speech, the fake news phenomenon, disinformation, and Trump's relationship with them.

On August 25, 2018, PJ Media published a story reporting that 96% of Google search results for Donald Trump were left-leaning.

On March 21, 2019, Trump signed an Executive Order "aimed at improving transparency and promoting free speech on college campuses:" "Every year the federal government provides educational institutions with more than $35 billion dollars in research funding, all of that money is now at stake. That's a lot of money. They're going to have to not like your views a lot, right?" Trump said. "If a college or university does not allow you to speak, we will not give them money." The order received praise from Charlie Kirk, Sarah Ruger, then director of the toleration and free expression division of the Charles Koch Institute, the Foundation for Individual Rights in Education (FIRE), Liberty University, and criticism from Janet Napolitano, then president of the University of California, the American Council on Education, and the American Civil Liberties Union, among others. It was also reported that the Trump administration sought to censor scientific research related to climate change, and that he downplayed the COVID-19 pandemic.

On May 15, 2019, the White House announced the launch of a "Tech Bias Reporting tool" for people to report instances of perceived social media bias, that was met with criticism. After Trump stated on Twitter that mail-in voting would lead to massive fraud in the 2020 presidential election, moderators marked the message with a "potentially misleading" warning, linking the post to fact-checking websites. On May 28, 2020, Trump signed the "Executive Order on Preventing Online Censorship" (EO 13925), an executive order directing regulatory action at Section 230. After considerable controversy, the order was later rescinded by President Biden.

In July 2021, after being deplatformed by social media companies, Trump sued them arguing they had violated his First Amendment rights to speak freely. These events elicited discussion about censorship in social media. In February 2022, Trump launched Truth Social, and in May, his lawsuit was dismissed.

=== Law enforcement ===
- Increasing investment in police personnel, increasing their liability protections, enforcing stop-and-frisk and existing gun laws, cracking down on the open use of illegal drugs, and cooperating with ICE to arrest and deport undocumented immigrants. Directing the DOJ to open civil rights investigations into "radical left prosecutor's offices" (Chicago, Los Angeles, San Francisco) to determine whether they have "engaged in race-based enforcement of the law", and giving "the victims of their Marxist policies the right to sue local officials for harm and suffering". "Dismantling of all criminal organizations." The death penalty for drug dealers and human traffickers. Sending the National Guard to restore safety in cities "where there has been a complete breakdown of law and order". Ordering the Education and Justice Departments to "overhaul federal standards on disciplining minors". Legislating concealed carry reciprocity. Increasing border controls.
- "Waging war" on drug cartels, using Title 42 to return trafficked children to their home countries, urging Congress to "ensure that anyone caught trafficking children [and women] across our border receives the death penalty immediately", and a recommendation to watch Sound of Freedom.
- Appointing 100 U.S. Attorneys who "will be the polar opposite of the Soros District Attorneys" (referring to a conspiracy theory that Alvin Bragg, the district attorney who indicted Trump in 2023, has been "bought and paid for" by George Soros). Overhauling the Department of Justice and the FBI. Launching civil rights investigations into "Marxist local district attorneys" in Chicago, San Francisco, Los Angeles and other cities, including "federal subpoenas of their staff, their emails, and their records to determine whether they have blatantly violated federal Civil Rights law". Launching a federal inquiry into the prosecutor of the Garrett Foster case, and ordering the Department of Justice "to establish a task force on protecting the right to self-defense". Investigating the "use of police state tactics by federal authorities to arrest conservatives and Christians". Confronting the "radicalization" of law schools, reforming bar associations, and stopping "the purge of conservative lawyers from major law firms".
- Deploying all necessary military assets to impose a full naval embargo on the cartels, ordering the "Department of Defense to make appropriate use of special forces, cyber warfare, and other overt and covert actions" against cartels, which will be designated as Foreign Terrorist Organizations, and cutting their access to global financial systems. Forging a partnership with neighboring governments, or "exposing their corruption". Asking "Congress to pass legislation ensuring that drug smugglers and human traffickers receive the Death Penalty".

=== National security ===
- Building a missile defense shield similar to Israel's Iron Dome, as a deterrent of and protection from foreign missile attacks.

Trump has repeatedly mentioned the idea of building an Iron Dome in his rallies, assuring it will create many jobs. Regarding this policy, Forbes commented that it would have "limited overall utility. At least 10 Iron Dome systems make up the lower tier of Israel's multilayered air defense, designed to intercept rockets, mortars, and artillery shells at a maximum distance of under 50 miles." An American Iron Dome would require hundreds of systems to cover the continental United States and its major population centers, and it would be inadequate to intercept large intercontinental ballistic missiles. However, it could be useful for the defense of military bases (specifically the overseas ones), and critical infrastructure. Haaretz called it a "fantasy", and after mentioning similar technical issues as Forbes, concluded that "[b]eyond all this, the United States has already spent hundreds of billions in missile defense research-and-development, and any upgrades similar to the ones Trump is vowing would need congressional support – something he failed to obtain for his border wall."

- Reinstating the initiative at the Department of Justice to target Chinese espionage in the United States, terminated by the Biden administration at the request of faculty members from the University of Pennsylvania; requesting from Congress to investigate the University's finances, its Chinese donors, the Biden Center, and the Biden family.

The China Initiative was launched in November 2018 to address Chinese economic espionage. Of the 28 prosecutions brought under it, four were against professors of Chinese descent, of whom none were convicted for espionage or theft.

On January 5, 2021, APA Justice, the Brennan Center for Justice, and Asian Americans Advancing Justice sent an open letter to then president-elect Joe Biden, stating that a "consequence of these mandates has been that the FBI and federal agencies have put pressure on grant makers, universities and research institutions to participate in racial, ethnic and national origin profiling, collectively leading to discriminatory and stigmatising investigations of people of Chinese descent."

In September 2021, 177 Stanford University faculty members sent an open letter to Attorney General Merrick Garland calling for the termination of the initiative, stating that "these actions do not just affect the prosecuted faculty but affect the many more university researchers who are targeted, investigated and feel threatened by inquiries initiated without prior evidence of significant wrongdoing".

Bloomberg stated that by December 2021, "[m]ore than 1,600 scholars and administrators from more than 200 universities have petitioned Garland to end the China Initiative, saying it disproportionately targets researchers of Chinese origin."

In February 2022, more than 150 University of Pennsylvania faculty members addressed an open letter to Attorney General Garland, "urging the U.S. Department of Justice to overturn the 'China Initiative' which they allege disproportionately targets researchers of Chinese descent."

On February 23, 2022, Matthew G. Olsen, Assistant Attorney General for National Security, announced the initiative "was being cast aside largely because of perceptions that it unfairly painted Chinese Americans and U.S. residents of Chinese origin as disloyal", but he "insisted that the decision amounted to a reframing and recalibration – not an abandonment – of a muscular law enforcement response to the national security threat posed by the People's Republic of China", and said that "department officials had concluded that the enforcement program singling out China was ill-advised and better reframed as part of a more wide-ranging effort to counter threats posed by Russia, Iran and other countries."

=== Social issues ===
- Revoking Biden's Executive Order 13985, to "eradicate any attempt to weaken America's institutions through these harmful and discriminatory 'equity' programs". Instructing the DOJ to investigate the "unlawful domination and discrimination and civil right abuses carried out by the Biden administration". Terminating all staff, offices, and initiatives connected to the equity policies, reviewing and reversing its actions, and requesting Congress to establish a restitution fund for those "discriminated against" by that policy.

Commenting on the possibility of a second Trump administration, Axios said, "close allies want to dramatically change the government's interpretation of Civil Rights-era laws to focus on 'anti-white racism' rather than discrimination against people of color", and quoted Trump campaign spokesperson Steven Cheung: "As President Trump has said, all staff, offices, and initiatives connected to Biden's un-American policy will be immediately terminated."

- Using "every tool, lever, and authority to get the homeless off our streets", by using the resources otherwise spent upon Ukraine, and "by ending mass unskilled migration". Banning urban camping wherever possible, arresting the violators, but giving them the option of rehabilitation treatment. Creating "tent cities" where the homeless can be relocated, have their problems identified, and receive either help to reintegrate into a normal life or medical treatment, including commitment to mental institutions, "with the goal of reintegrating them back into society once they are well enough to manage".
- Eradicating the drug addiction crisis, by imposing a "full naval embargo on the drug cartels and deploy military assets to inflict maximum damage on cartel operations", insisting on the cooperation of neighboring governments to dismantle the trafficking networks in the region, requiring Congress that drug dealers and human traffickers receive the death penalty. Directing federal law enforcement to take down the gangs and organized street crime that distribute drugs locally. Permanently designating fentanyl as a federally controlled substance. Warning China that if they don't "clamp down" on the export of fentanyl precursors "they will pay a steep price". Also, to combat local addiction, "strengthen the pillars that give life meaning and hope for those struggling with addiction, in particular work, faith and family". Making easier for addicts to seek treatment without losing their jobs. Forging public-private partnerships to provide job opportunities and skills training to former addicts. Expanding federal support for "faith-based counseling, treatment, and recovery programs". Ensuring that if someone needs to take time to care for a relative fighting to overcome addiction, they can use a family leave program.
- Signing an executive order to cut off funding for shelter and transport of immigrants ("nearly $1 billion to house illegal aliens and foreign migrants in expensive luxury hotels"), and redirect a large portion of the savings to provide shelter and treatment for homeless American veterans, promising to totally eradicate veterans' homelessness by the end of next term.

According to Snopes, the expenses for housing immigrants waiting to be expelled were $86.9 million during a period of six months in 2021. The places used were "family residential centers", "contracted shelters", and "hotels", like the "Quality Suites in San Diego; Hampton Inns in Phoenix and in McAllen and El Paso, Texas; a Comfort Suites Hotel in Miami; a Best Western in Los Angeles; and an Econo Lodge in Seattle". The funds were managed by the non-profit Endeavors, which also serves veterans. "Migrant families were similarly housed in U.S. hotels under the Obama and Trump administrations." Trump made a similar claim during the debate on June 27, 2024, which was fact-checked as false.

=== Transgender and LGBT rights ===
- Terminating all types of gender affirming care for minors. Instructing every federal agency to cease all programs that promote the concept of sex and gender transition "at any age", stopping federal funding for all gender-affirming procedures, and declaring that any hospital or healthcare provider participating in gender affirming care for minors will no longer meet federal health and safety standards for Medicaid and Medicare, terminating them from the program. Creating ways to sue physicians who have performed those procedures, and directing the DOJ to investigate pharmaceutical companies and hospitals to determine whether they have covered "horrific long-term side-effects of 'sex transitions' to get rich at the expense of vulnerable patients" and whether they have illegally marketed hormones and puberty blockers. The Department of Education will inform states and school districts that if anybody suggests to a child that they could be transgender, they will face potential civil rights violations cases for sex discrimination, and elimination from federal funding. Passing a bill establishing that the only genders recognized by the government are male and female, and they are assigned at birth.

The Advocate called these policies "devastating for LGBTQ+ Americans and other marginalized communities", adding "that [they] threaten the LGBTQ+ community, spanning across education, health care, and the military". LGBTQ Nation qualified Trump's agenda as "troubling", ending with "[w]hether that agenda encompasses Project 2025 or Agenda 47 or both, the results would be disastrous."

== Reception ==
Anthony Zurcher of BBC News said "some of [Trump's] pronouncements border on the fantastical" and "others are controversial." Margaret Hartmann, writing in New York magazine, described some of the ideas as "unhinged". Frankie Taggart, writing for Barron's, argued that Trump's plans lack coherence and that some could exacerbate existing divisions in American society. He questioned the feasibility and practicality of some ideas, such as the promise to improve cities with classical architecture and create tent cities for the homeless.

Prominent economists and investors criticized the economic agenda of Trump as inflationary, especially noting his proposed 10% universal tariff.

Some columnists have described Agenda 47's plans as fascist or authoritarian.
