= Heidi Overton =

American physician (born 1989)

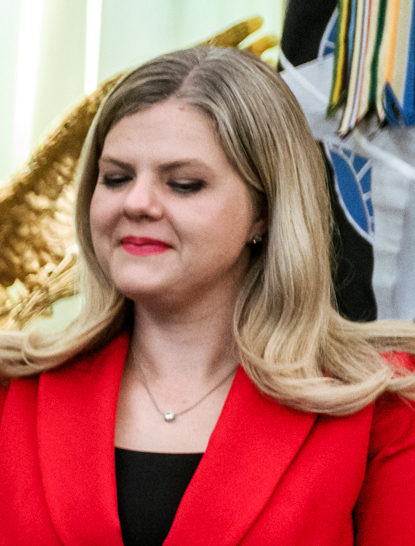
- Overton in 2026
- Born: 1989 (age 36–37); Cortez, Colorado, U.S.
- Education: University of New Mexico (BA, MD); Johns Hopkins University (PhD)

Heidi Overton (born 1989) is an American physician and health policymaker who served as the deputy assistant to the president for domestic policy in the second Trump administration.

Overton graduated from the University of New Mexico with a Bachelor of Arts in 2011 and with a Doctor of Medicine in 2015. At the University of New Mexico, she served as its student regent in her final two graduate years. Overton performed her residency training at Johns Hopkins Hospital, at first specializing in surgery and then training in public health and general preventive medicine. In December 2019, Overton was named a White House fellow. Following Donald Trump's loss in the 2020 presidential election, she joined the America First Policy Institute to assist in its healthcare policy.

After Trump's victory in the 2024 presidential election, Overton was named the deputy assistant to the president for domestic policy. She was involved in executing Secretary of Health and Human Services Robert F. Kennedy Jr.'s Make America Healthy Again agenda, particularly as a mediator and policy strategist. In August 2026, Trump named Overton as his nominee to serve as the commissioner of food and drugs. Trump withdrew Overton's nomination in November 2026.

== Early life and education (1989–2015) ==
Heidi Overton was born in 1989 in Cortez, Colorado. Overton's father was a Christian minister, while her mother was an obstetrician and gynecologist at a Christian hospital in McKinley County. She lived in Durango, Colorado, and Carlsbad, New Mexico, before her family moved to Gallup, New Mexico, when she was eight. Overton graduated from Gallup High School, where she was the co-valedictorian of her class.

Overton began attending the University of New Mexico in 2007, when she enrolled in a program guaranteeing her admission to its medical school. In May 2011, she graduated summa cum laude from the University of New Mexico with a Bachelor of Arts in health, medicine, and human values. In January 2013, New Mexico governor Susana Martinez nominated Overton as the University of New Mexico's student regent; she was confirmed by the New Mexico Senate in March. As a student regent, she opposed a tuition increase and an increase in deductibles. Her two-year tenure officially ended in January 2015. Overton graduated from the University of New Mexico School of Medicine in May 2015.

== Career ==
=== Johns Hopkins University (2015–2022) ===
After graduating from the University of New Mexico, Overton began residency training in surgery at Johns Hopkins Hospital. She worked on a study examining opioid guidelines with Marty Makary in 2018. Overton became a physician board-certified in public health and general preventive medicine. She holds a Maryland medical license.

In 2022, Overton completed a doctoral degree in clinical investigation from the Johns Hopkins Bloomberg School of Public Health. Her thesis was entitled "The Development and Assessment of Appropriateness Measures for Postoperative Opioid Prescribing", and Makary served as research advisor.

=== White House Fellow (2019–2021) ===
In December 2019, Overton was named a White House fellow, serving in the position while she sought her surgical residency at Johns Hopkins. She worked in the Office of American Innovation and the Domestic Policy Council. Overton was involved in the federal government's response to the COVID-19 pandemic.

=== America First Policy Institute (2021–2025) ===
Following Donald Trump's loss in the 2020 presidential election, Overton joined the America First Policy Institute (AFPI). As the director of AFPI's Center for a Healthy America, she led AFPI's healthcare policy team alongside former Louisiana governor Bobby Jindal.

=== Domestic Policy Council (2025–present) ===
After Trump's victory in the 2024 presidential election, Overton became the deputy assistant to the president for domestic policy. According to The Atlantic, she helped hire Secretary of Health and Human Services Robert F. Kennedy Jr.'s staff. Overton participated in meetings with officials from the agriculture industry regarding the MAHA Commission. Kennedy publicly praised Overton and another advisor, Calley Means, for their work in producing a report calling for additional reviews on chemicals in food and regulations on pharmaceutical advertisements in September 2025. According to The Wall Street Journal, Overton opposed Trump's decision to initiate the removal of cannabis from Schedule I of the Controlled Substances Act.

In July 2026, The Atlantic described Overton as "one of the most powerful public-health officials" in Trump's second term. She has been involved in several policies related to Kennedy's Make America Healthy Again (MAHA) movement, including the establishment of The New Pyramid—particularly by mediating disagreements between Secretary of Agriculture Brooke Rollins and Kennedy—and changes to childhood vaccine recommendations. Overton's work garnered criticism from several people within the movement, who accused her of intentionally limiting its reach; Kennedy, by contrast, has vocally defended Overton on several occasions. After Susan Monarez was removed as the director of the Centers for Disease Control and Prevention, Overton was offered the position; she declined the offer. In April 2026, the Wall Street Journal reported that Overton and Means were involved in expediting an executive order fast-tracking reviews for psychedelic drugs.

== Commissioner of Food and Drugs nomination ==
In June 2026, Bloomberg News reported that Overton was among several candidates being considered to succeed Marty Makary as the commissioner of food and drugs. By August, she had been interviewed for the position alongside the physician Jeff Vacirca. On August 19, Trump named Overton as his nominee. That month, Louisiana senator Bill Cassidy, the chair of the Senate Committee on Health, Education, Labor and Pensions, expressed concern about Overton's involvement in an executive order on childhood vaccinations. Trump formally submitted Overton's nomination to the Senate on September 14.

Overton appeared before the Senate Committee on Health, Education, Labor and Pensions on September 24, 2026. She supported access to abortion pills and vaccines, but refused to say whether she would push back against Trump's claim that Tylenol causes autism. Overton received skepticism from some Republican and Democratic senators for supporting the executive order on childhood vaccinations. On November 17, one day before the committee was set to vote on advancing Overton's nomination, Trump withdrew the nomination.

== Views ==
Overton is an opponent of abortion. She has supported the Make America Healthy Again movement, arguing that it must be "pro-business, pro-innovation, deregulatory, pro-patient-and-doctor, pro-farmer, and America-first."
