= Saphier =

Saphier is a surname. Notable people with the surname include:

- Nicole Saphier (born 1982), American radiologist
- Regina Saphier, Hungarian writer
