= The Innocents of Florence =

2025 book

The Innocents of Florence: The Renaissance Discovery of Childhood
- Author: Joseph Luzzi
- Language: English
- Genre: History
- Publisher: W. W. Norton & Company
- Publication date: November 11, 2025
- Pages: 240
- ISBN: 978-1324065784

The Innocents of Florence: The Renaissance Discovery of Childhood is a 2025 history book by Literature and Italian Studies scholar Joseph Luzzi.

== Overview ==
The book covers the history of the Ospedale degli Innocenti, an orphanage in Florence built during the early Italian Renaissance.

== Critical reception ==
Kirkus Reviews described the book as "eye-opening" and "More than a history of a building — a fascinating portrait of Renaissance life." Jessica Winter of The New Yorker described the book as "slender and compelling." Writing in The Guardian, historian Joe Moran of Liverpool John Moores University praised the book for painting "a wonderfully sensual and cinematic picture of early modern Florence in all its grubby, gorgeous detail" and for being "an absorbing case study in how the beautiful frescoes, arching columns and paintings of the Italian Renaissance masked 'the sweat and suffering of forced labor, the raping of slaves, the abuse of children,'" while noting that "Luzzi mostly tells the story straight, without the blend of memoir and scholarship that characterises his previous books."

Tara Isabella Burton of The Wall Street Journal described the book as "poignant, if at times meandering," saying that it was an "empathetic study of the perpetual interplay between good intentions, human frailties and imperfect outcomes," but that it lost focus once it moved beyond the Renaissance era.
