= Metabolism (disambiguation) =

Metabolism is the set of life-sustaining chemical reactions in organisms.

Metabolism may also refer to:

- Basal metabolic rate, calories burned at rest
- Drug metabolism
- The journal Metabolism: Clinical and Experimental
- Metabolism (architecture)
