= Nicole Saphier =

American radiologist (born 1981/1982)

Surgeon General of the United States
- Designate
- Assuming office TBD
- President: Donald Trump
- Succeeding: Vivek Murthy

Personal details
- Born: 1981 or 1982 (age 44–45) Scottsdale, Arizona, U.S.
- Spouse: Paul Saphier
- Children: 3
- Education: Arizona State University (BA); Ross University (MD)

Nicole Saphier (born 1981 or 1982) is an American radiologist, medical journalist, and author. Saphier holds a Doctor of Medicine from the Ross University School of Medicine in Portsmouth, Dominica and practiced medicine at the Memorial Sloan Kettering Cancer Center and taught at the Weill Cornell Medicine.

Besides practicing medicine, she was hired as a commentator for Fox News in 2018, notably contributing to a 2020 White House Coronavirus Task Force townhall. She also hosts the Wellness Unmasked podcast. In April 2026, President Donald Trump nominated Saphier to serve as the surgeon general of the United States. During her nomination process, Saphier has been described as part of the Make America Healthy Again movement.

== Early life and education ==
Nicole Saphier was born in Scottsdale, Arizona, in 1981 or 1982. She became pregnant at 17. Saphier graduated from high school in Gilbert, Arizona. She graduated from Arizona State University with a Bachelor of Arts and from the Ross University School of Medicine in Portsmouth, Dominica, with a Doctor of Medicine.

== Career ==
Saphier performed her residency training at Maricopa Integrated Health Systems. While in residency, she met Paul Saphier; they later married and had two children together. Saphier completed her oncological imaging fellowship at Mayo Clinic in Arizona and she later practiced as a physician at the Memorial Sloan Kettering Cancer Center, the director of breast imaging at the center's facility in Monmouth, New Jersey, and an associate professor at Weill Cornell Medicine.

In 2018, Saphier was hired as a contributor for Fox News. In March 2020, she contributed to a virtual town hall on the network that featured President Donald Trump and members of the White House Coronavirus Task Force. After Trump nominated her to serve as the surgeon general of the United States, Saphier's contract with Fox News was terminated. In addition, Saphier has hosted Wellness Unmasked, a health and wellness podcast.

Saphier is a member of the Centers for Disease Control and Prevention's Advisory Committee on Breast Cancer in Young Women, and is an advisor to the New Jersey Department of Health. She has sold herbal tinctures through a product line known as DropRx.

== Surgeon General nomination ==
On April 30, 2026, President Donald Trump withdrew Casey Means' nomination to serve as surgeon general of the United States and nominated Saphier to the position. Saphier's nomination was opposed by several individuals within the Make America Healthy Again movement, including the author Vani Hari, the media personality Alex Clark, and the physician Robert W. Malone, who noted her relatively moderate stance on the movement.

== Views ==
Saphier is a proponent of the Make America Healthy Again movement. After Trump and Secretary of Health and Human Services Robert F. Kennedy Jr. claimed that acetaminophen caused autism, she advised pregnant women to follow the advice of their doctors. Saphier has supported Kennedy's calls for inquiries into increasing rates of autism, though she rejected Kennedy's methods in an opinion article for The Wall Street Journal.

=== COVID-19 ===
Saphier opposed the first Trump administration's communication about the COVID-19 pandemic and stated that "politicization of science" had occurred in the administration, adding that it continued into the Biden administration. She praised Operation Warp Speed, an initiative to expedite research into COVID-19 vaccines, but criticized vaccine mandates imposed in the Biden administration. In 2022, she advocated against mask and vaccine mandates amid the pandemic. That year, Saphier falsely criticized the Centers for Disease Control and Prevention for holding a vote to mandate schoolchildren receive COVID-19 vaccines; the claim misinterpreted the planned meeting, which was for the Vaccines for Children Program.

=== Healthcare industry ===
In Make America Healthy Again (2020), Saphier opposed the Affordable Care Act and single-payer healthcare plans.

=== Transgender health care ===
Saphier has been vocally opposed to gender-affirming care, has referred to being transgender as a "national emergency", and opposed research into hormone blockers.

== Personal life ==
Saphier is a practicing Catholic.

== Bibliography ==
In 2020, Saphier authored Make America Healthy Again: How Bad Behavior and Big Government Caused a Trillion-Dollar Crisis. The book advocated a prevention-first approach and freedom of choice in healthcare. In 2024, she published Love, Mom: Inspiring Stories Celebrating Motherhood, a chronology of various mothers. Saphier has additionally authored Panic Attack: Playing Politics with Science in the Fight Against COVID-19.

== Awards and recognition ==
In 2019, Saphier was named as the Top Radiologist of the Year by the International Association of Top Professionals.
