= Christos Socrates Mantzoros =

Greek American physician and scientist

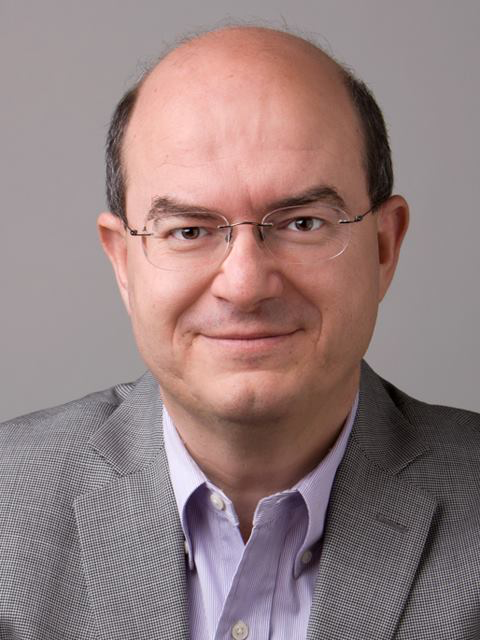
- Mantzoros in 2016
- Born: Nafplio, Greece
- Education: Harvard Medical School (MS); Harvard T.H. Chan School of Public Health (MS); University of Athens Medical School (DSc); University of Athens Medical School (MD)
- Occupations: Doctor; Professor
- Known for: Leptin; Adiponectin
- Awards: Endocrine Society's Outstanding Scholarly Physician Laureate Award (2025); Gerald Reaven, Distinguished Leader in Insulin Resistance Award (2022); American Society of Nutrition E.V. McCollum Award (2020) Endocrine Society's Outstanding Clinical Investigator Award (2018)
- Scientific career
- Fields: Endocrinology; Diabetes; Metabolism
- Workplaces: Harvard Medical School, Beth Israel Deaconess Medical Center
- Website: www.bidmc.org/research/research-by-department/medicine/endocrinology/laboratories/mantzoros-lab

Christos Socrates Mantzoros is a Greek-born American internist-endocrinologist, teacher, and researcher. He is a professor of medicine at Harvard Medical School and an adjunct professor at Boston University School of Medicine. In the past, he has also served as a professor at the Harvard T.H. Chan School of Public Health.

He is certified in internal medicine, endocrinology, and metabolism in both Europe and the United States, and serves as the chief of endocrinology, diabetes, and metabolism at the VA Boston Healthcare System. Mantzoros is the founding Director of Human Nutrition at Beth Israel Deaconess Medical Center (BIDMC), Harvard Medical School, and Editor-in-Chief of the journal "Metabolism: Clinical and Experimental".

Mantzoros served as a board member on the Hellenic College Holy Cross, as well as the ALBA Graduate Business School of the American College of Greece board of trustees.

== Research ==
Mantzoros' research is primarily focused on topics such as human physiology and molecular biology, observational epidemiology studies, and clinical trials treating obesity, diabetes, and other human metabolic diseases. Leptin has been approved by the United States Food and Drug Administration (FDA) for treating lipodystrophy and severe insulin resistance accompanied by hyperglycemia and hyperlipidemia.

His publications consist of two books, more than 1,100 scientific papers, and he has conducted over 135 clinical trials.

== Additional work ==
Mantzoros heads Mantzoros Consulting, LLC. In 2005, he co-founded Intekrin, Inc., which was later acquired by and merged with Coherus, Inc.

== Teaching and mentoring ==
Mantzoros teaches at Harvard Medical School and Boston University School of Medicine.

He is on the ALBA Graduate Business School of the American College of Greece Board of Trustees.

== Awards ==
Mantzoros is the recipient of the following awards:

- 2025 Celia Carrión Pérez de Tudela Award in Lipodystrophy Research
- 2025 Endocrine Society's Outstanding Scholarly Physician Laureate Award
- 2021 Korean Society of Nutrition Award co-administered with the American Society for Nutrition
- 2020 Gerald Reaven Distinguished Leader in Insulin Resistance Award
- 2020 American Society for Nutrition E.V. McCollum Award
- 2018 American Society for Nutrition Robert H. Herman Research Award
- 2018 European Society of Endocrinology Geoffrey Harris Award
- 2018 Endocrine Society's Outstanding Clinical Investigator Award
- 2017 Obesity Society TOPS Award

Other (selected) awards include:

- 2011 Berson Award Lecture by the American Physiological Society (FASEB)
- 2008 Outstanding Investigator Award by the American Federation of Medical Research
- 2007 Election to American Society for Clinical Investigation (ASCI)
- 2006 Frontiers in Science Award by the American Association of Clinical Endocrinology
- 2006 Novartis Award in Diabetes and Metabolic Diseases by the American Diabetes Association
- 2006 Lilly Award by the North American Association for the Study of Obesity (the Obesity Society)
- 2006 Mead Johnson Award by the American Society for Nutrition
- 2006 HypoCCS Award in Paris, France
- 2006 Wilhelm Friedrich Bessel Award by the Humboldt Foundation of Germany
