= Ospedale degli Innocenti =

Historic building in Florence, Italy

Coordinates: 43°46′35″N 11°15′40″E

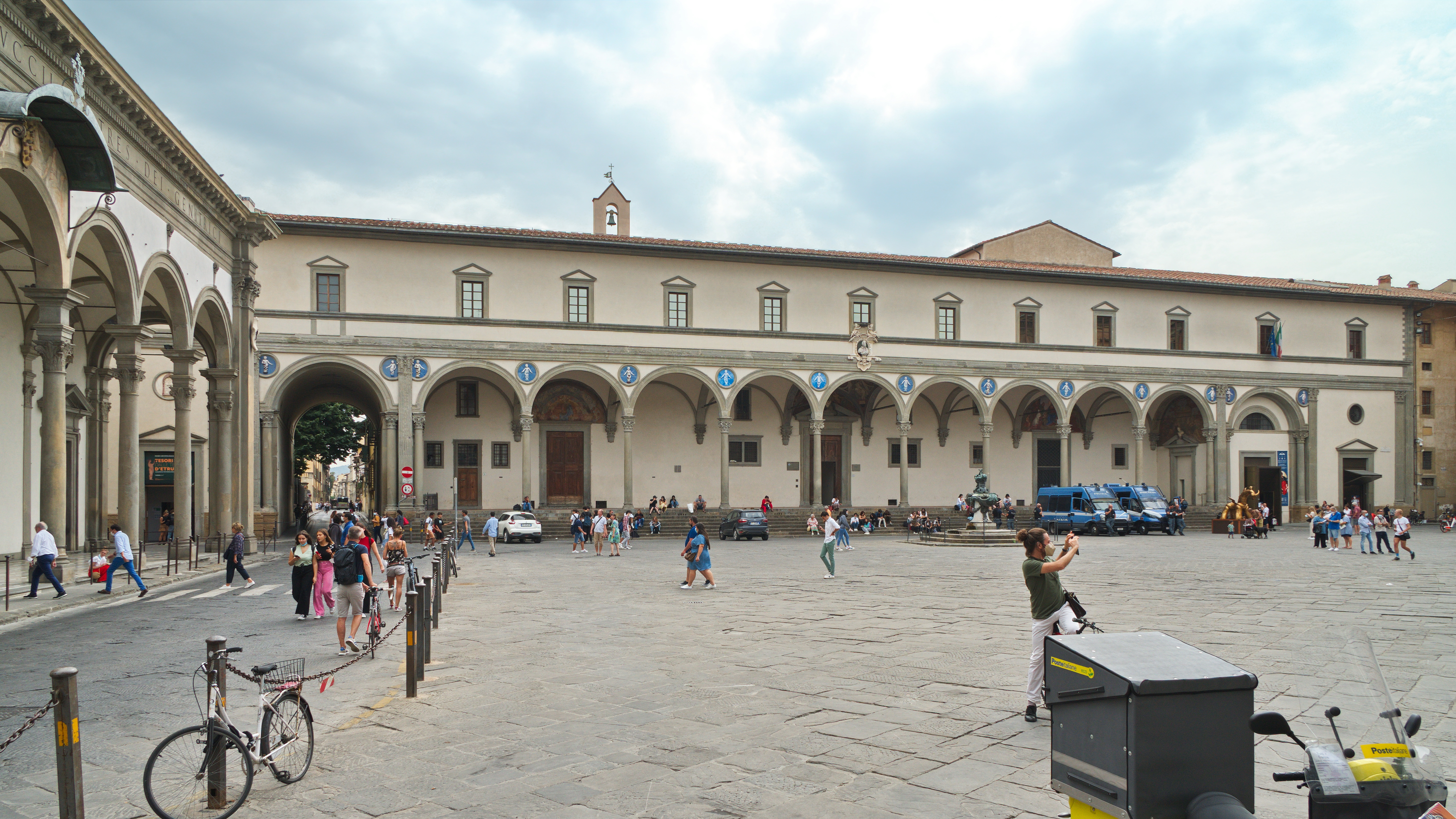
Ospedale degli Innocenti, Florence

The Ospedale degli Innocenti (Italian pronunciation: [ospeˈdaːle deʎʎ innoˈtʃɛnti]; "Hospital of the Innocents"), also known in old Tuscan dialect as the Spedale degli Innocenti, is a historic building in Florence, Italy. It was designed by Filippo Brunelleschi, who received the commission in 1419 from the Arte della Seta. It was originally a foundling hospital. It is regarded as a notable example of early Italian Renaissance architecture. The hospital, which features a nine bay loggia facing the Piazza SS. Annunziata, was built and managed by the Arte della Seta or Silk Guild of Florence. That guild was one of the wealthiest in the city and, like most guilds, took upon itself philanthropic duties.

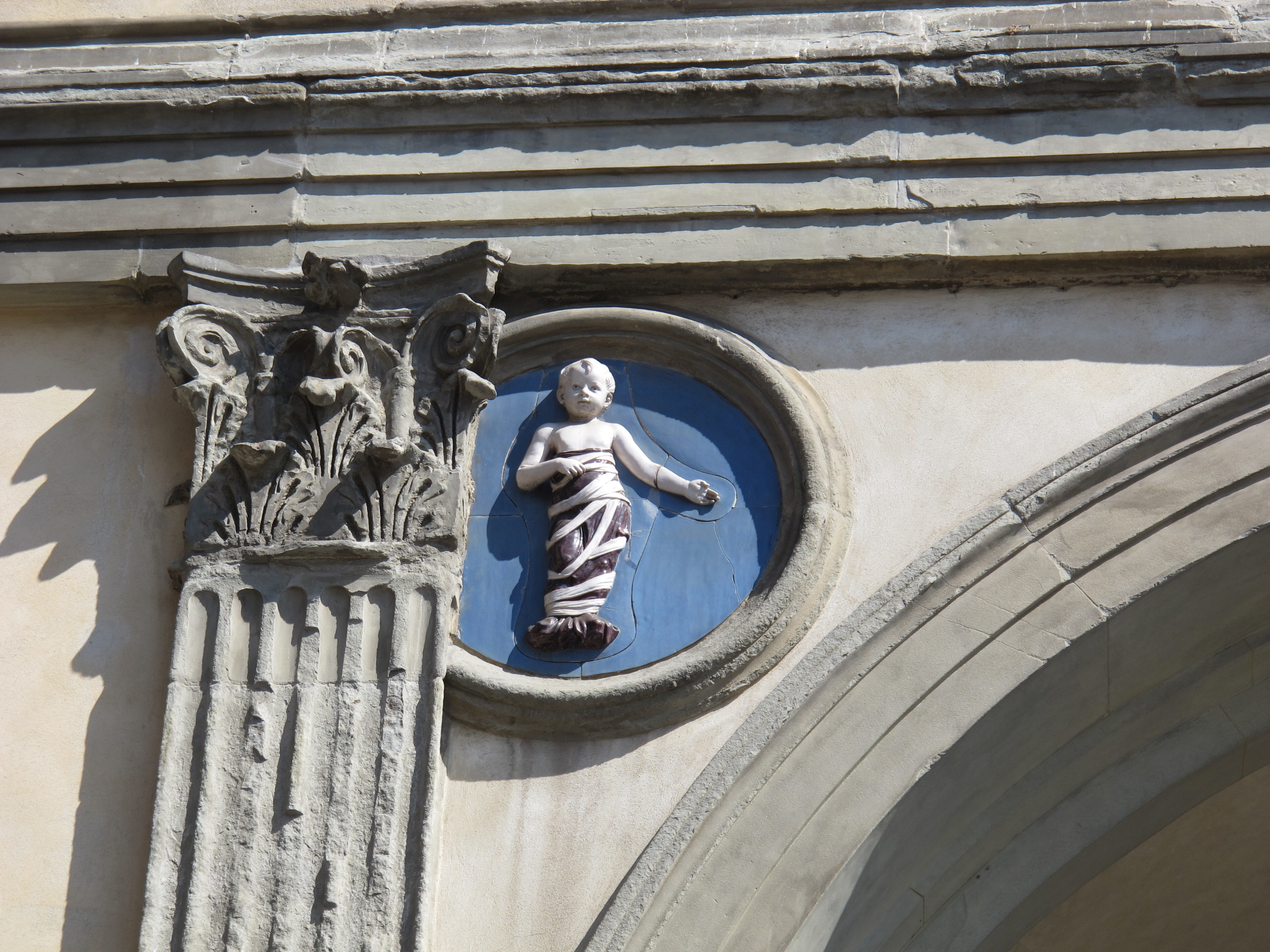
Detail with one of the tondi

Since 1988 and as of March 2026 the building serves as the base of operations for the UNICEF Innocenti Research Centre, and also houses an art museum.

== Architecture ==
The building "is considered to be the first pure Early Renaissance structure".

=== Façade ===
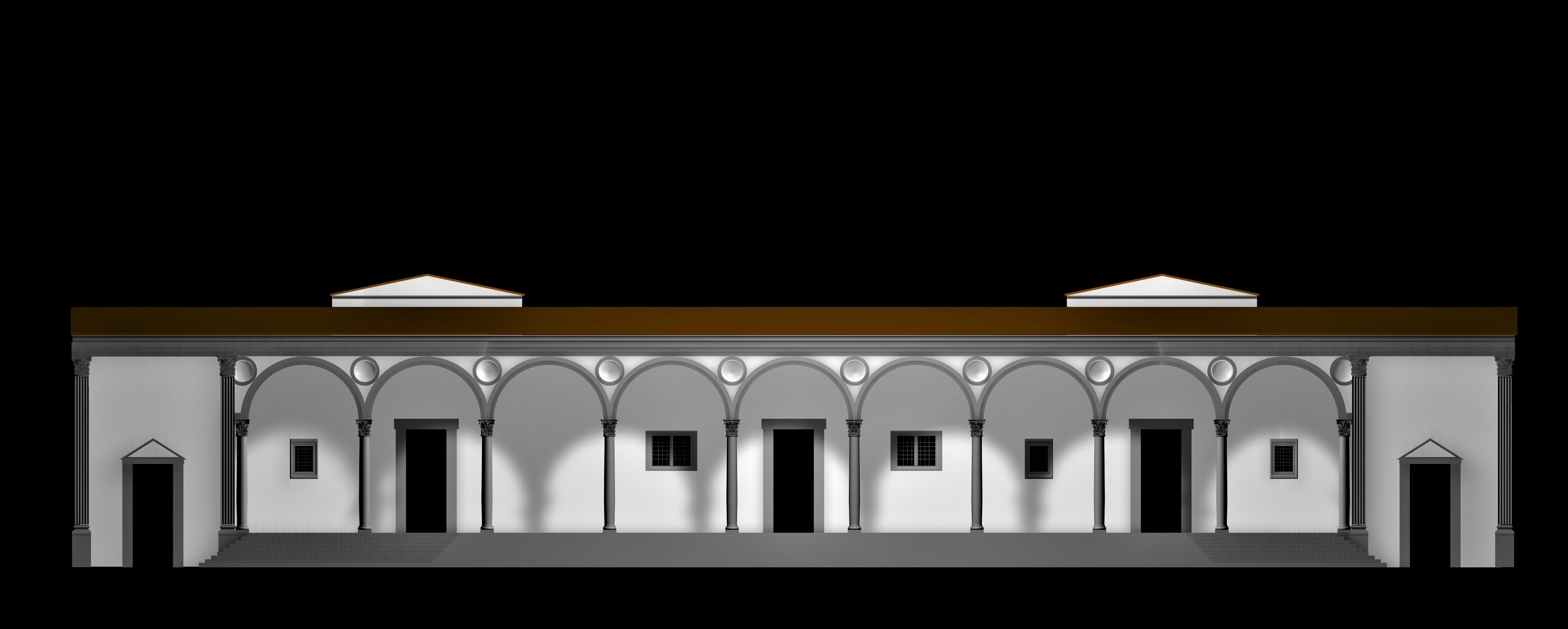
Reconstruction of the facade by Adriano Marinazzo without the upper floor

The central façade is made up of nine bays of semicircular arches springing from columns of the Composite order, in an arcade or loggia several steps above the square. The round arches are a revival of the style of classical architecture, no longer using pointed arches. In the spandrels of the arches there are glazed blue terracotta roundels with reliefs of babies designed by Andrea della Robbia suggesting the function of the building. There is a further bay at each end, with no steps and fluted pilasters.

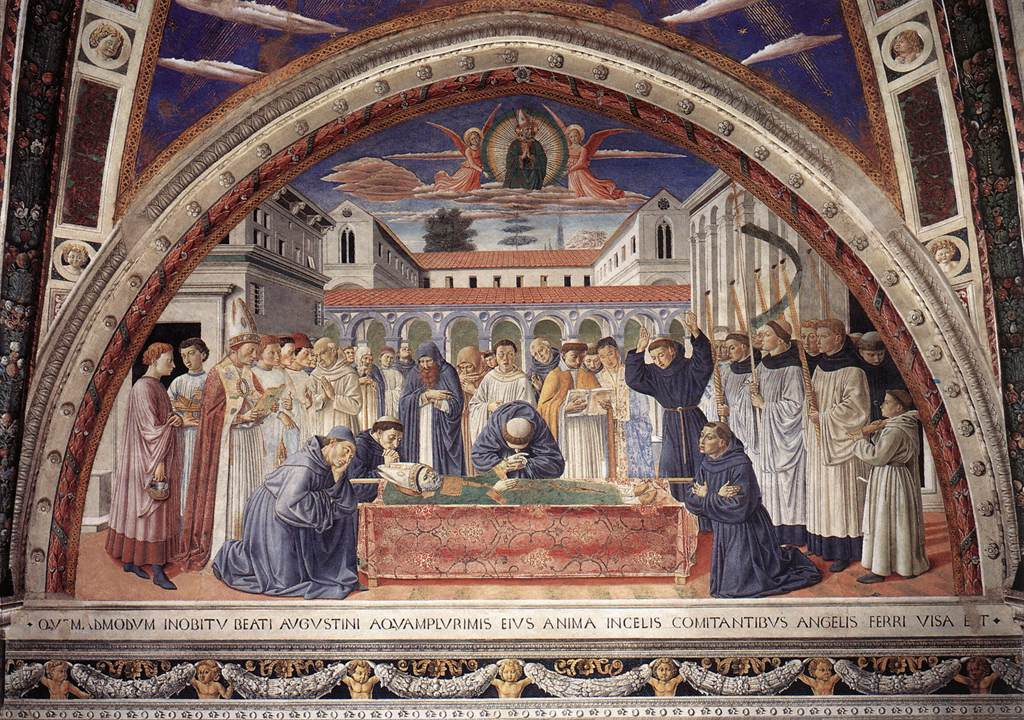
Benozzo Gozzoli, Burial of Saint Augustine (1464–1465), Sant'Agostino, San Gimignano

The upper floor was added later; it was not in place in the 1460s, when the building is shown in the background of a fresco by Benozzo Gozzoli of the Burial of Saint Augustine (1464–1465) in the church of Sant'Agostino in San Gimignano. Above each semicircular arch, on the upper floor is a tabernacle window, with a triangular pediment on the top.

The building reveals a clean and clear sense of proportion. The height of the columns is the same as the width of the intercolumniation and the width of the arcade, making each bay a cube. The building's simple proportions reflect a new age, one of secular education, and a sense of great order and clarity. Similarly, the height of the entablature is half the column height, as is appropriate for a clear-minded society.

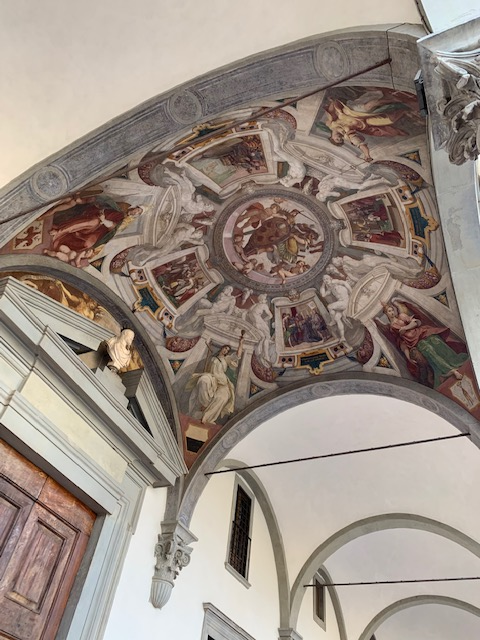

Children were sometimes abandoned in a basin which was located at the front portico. However, this basin was removed in 1660 and replaced by a wheel for secret refuge. There was a door with a special rotating horizontal wheel that brought the baby into the building without the parent being seen. This allowed people to leave their babies, anonymously, to be cared for by the orphanage. This system was in operation until the hospital's closure in 1875.

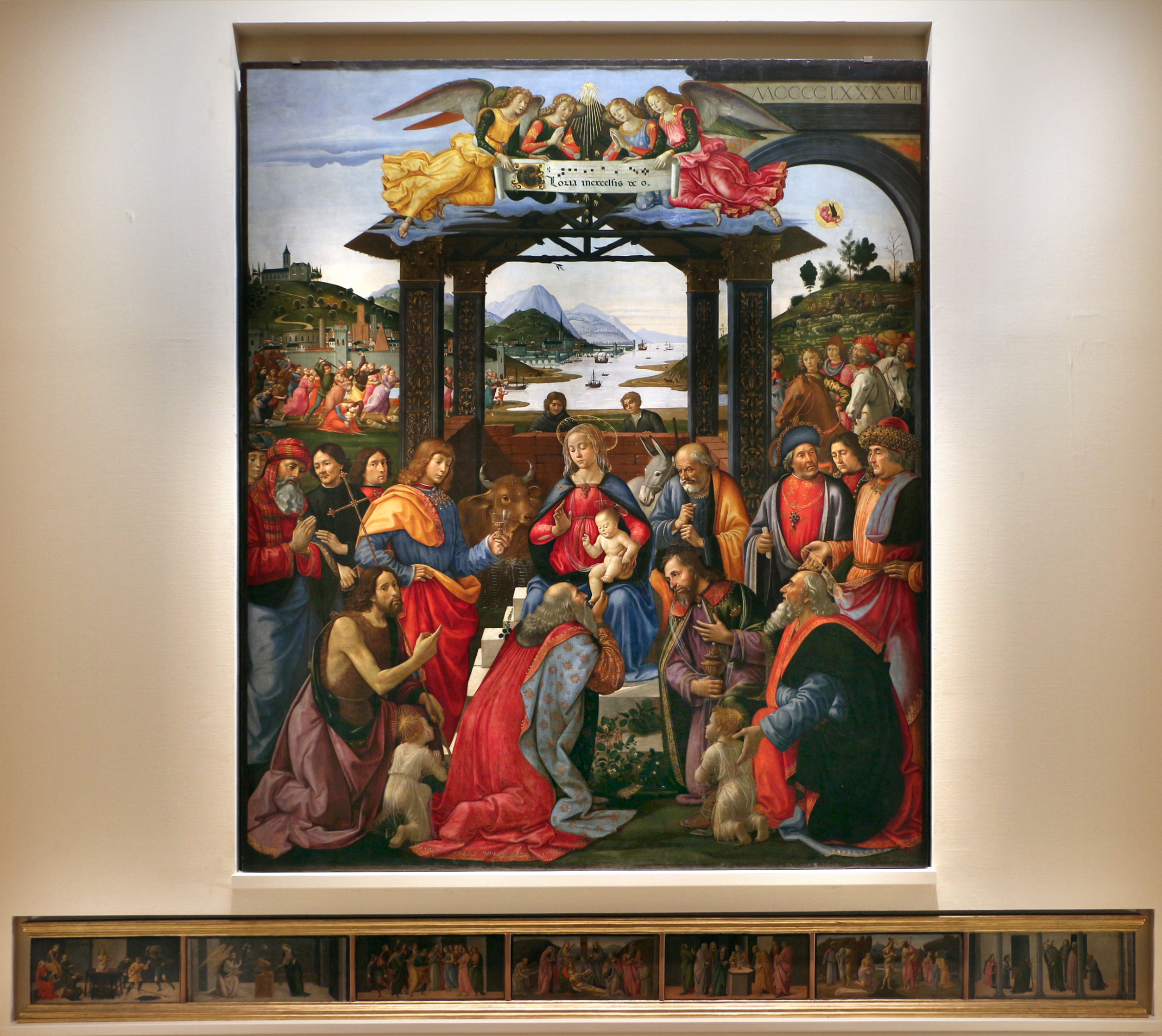
Adoration of the Magi by Domenico Ghirlandaio

=== Building history ===
The Foundling Hospital was constructed in several phases and only the first phase (1419–1427) was under Brunelleschi's direct supervision. He managed the laying of foundations, raising of main walls, completion of the basement with a cryptoporticus beneath the cloister walks, and the lower part of the front facing loggia. Later phases added the attic story (1439), but omitted the pilasters that Brunelleschi seems to have envisioned, and expanded the building by one bay to the south (1430). The vaulted passageway in the bay to the left of the loggia was also added later. Since the loggia was started before the hospital was begun, the hospital was not formally opened until 1445.

=== Design ===
Brunelleschi's design was based on Classical Roman, Italian Romanesque and late Gothic architecture. The loggia was a well-known building type, such as the Loggia dei Lanzi. But the use of round columns with classically correct capitals, in this case of the composite order, in conjunction with dosserets (or impost blocks) was novel. So too, the circular arches and the segmented spherical domes behind them. The architectural elements were also all articulated in grey stone (pietra serena) and set off against the white of the walls. Also novel was the proportional logic. The heights of the columns, for example, was not arbitrary. If a horizontal line is drawn along the tops of the columns, a square is created out of the height of the column and the distance from one column to the next. This desire for regularity and geometric order was to become an important element in Renaissance architecture.

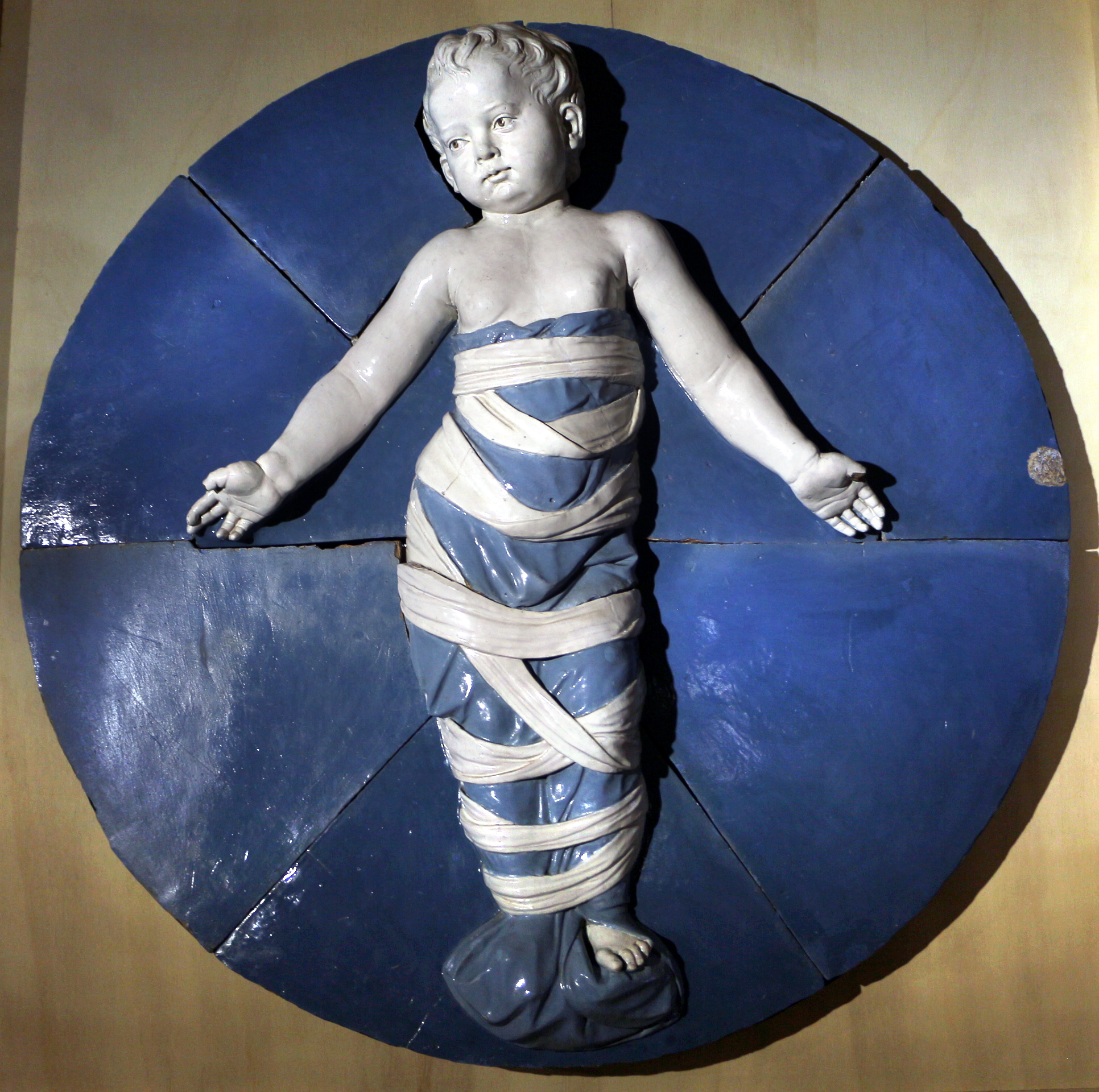
Andrea della Robbia, tondo in glazed terracotta, c. 1487, in the museum

=== The tondi ===
Above each column is a ceramic tondo. These were originally meant by Brunelleschi to be blank concavities, but around 1490 Andrea della Robbia was commissioned to fill them in. The design features a baby in swaddling clothes. A few of the tondi are still the original ones, but, like the capitals, most of them are 19th century copies, the originals are shown in the museum.

The insignia of the American Academy of Pediatrics is based on one of the tondi.

=== Piazza Santissima Annunziata ===
The Foundling Hospital defines the eastern side of the Piazza Santissima Annunziata, the other two principal facades of which were built later to imitate Brunelleschi's loggia. The piazza was not designed by Brunelleschi, as is sometimes reported in guide books. The west façade, the Loggia dei Servi di Maria, was designed by Antonio da Sangallo the Elder in the 1520s. It was built for the mendicant order, the Servi di Maria, but is today a hotel. The north side of the piazza is defined by the Basilica della Santissima Annunziata, the Basilica of the Most Holy Annunciation. Though the building is much older, the facade was added in 1601 by the architect Giovanni Battista Caccini. The equestrian statue of Ferdinand I of Tuscany was made by the noted sculptor Giambologna and placed there in 1608. The fountain was added in 1640.

== History of the hospital ==
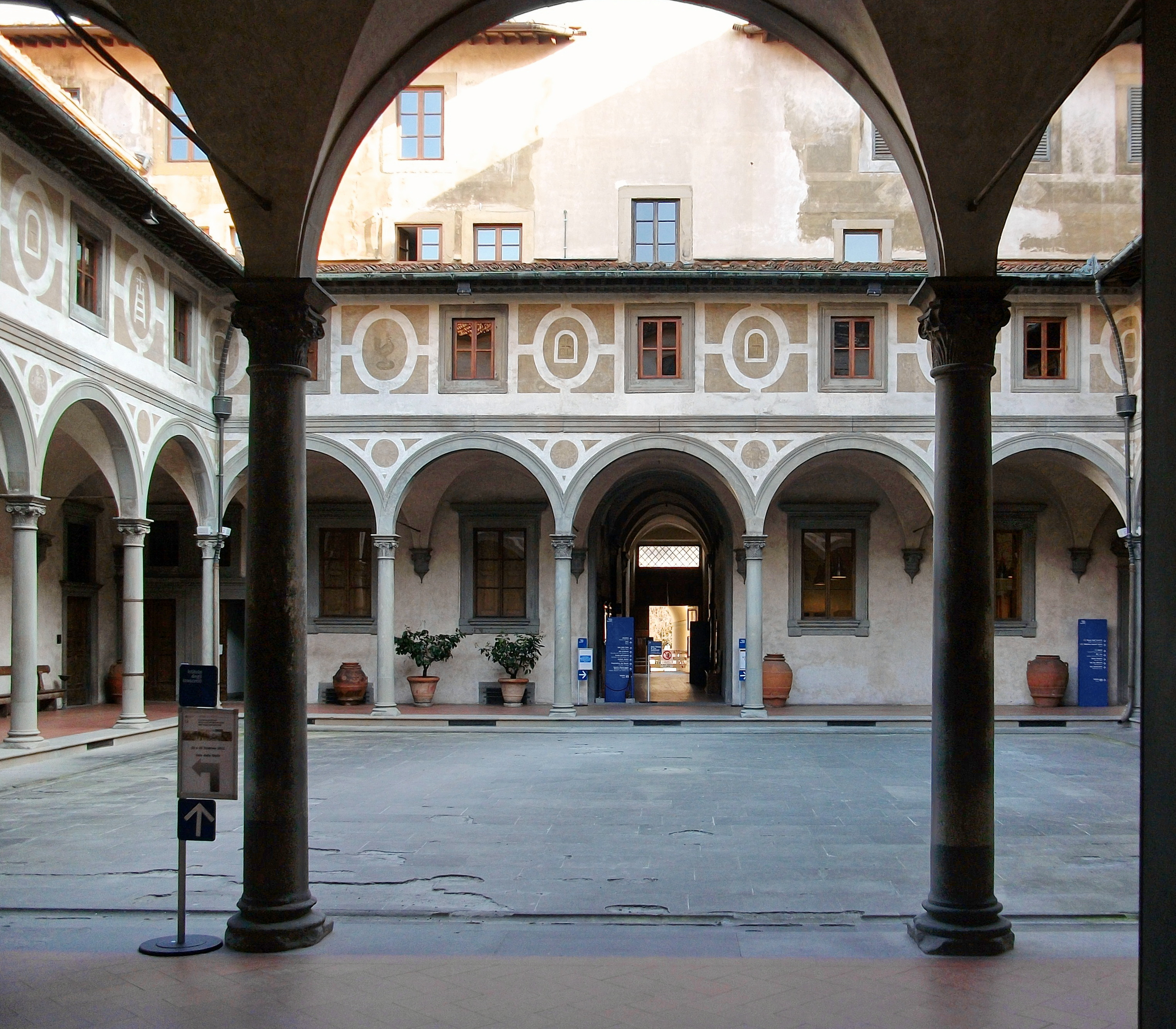
Men's cloister (separate from the women's cloister)

The Ospedale degli Innocenti, which features a nine bay loggia facing the Piazza SS. Annunziata, was built and managed by the Arte della Seta or Silk Guild of Florence. That guild was one of the wealthiest in the city and, like most guilds, took upon itself philanthropic duties.

The Ospedale degli Innocenti's care was comprehensive, and provided the children with the ability to rejoin society. The first infant abandoned was on February 5, 1445, ten days after opening. Babies were received, wet nursed and weaned. Masters were hired to teach reading and writing to boys. Boys were taught skills according to their abilities while girls were sent to mistresses who taught them how to sew, cook and other such occupations. The hospital provided dowries for the girls, and they had the option of getting married or becoming nuns. In the late 1520s, an extension was built to the south along the Via de' Fibbiai. This was intentionally for women who did not marry or become a nun.

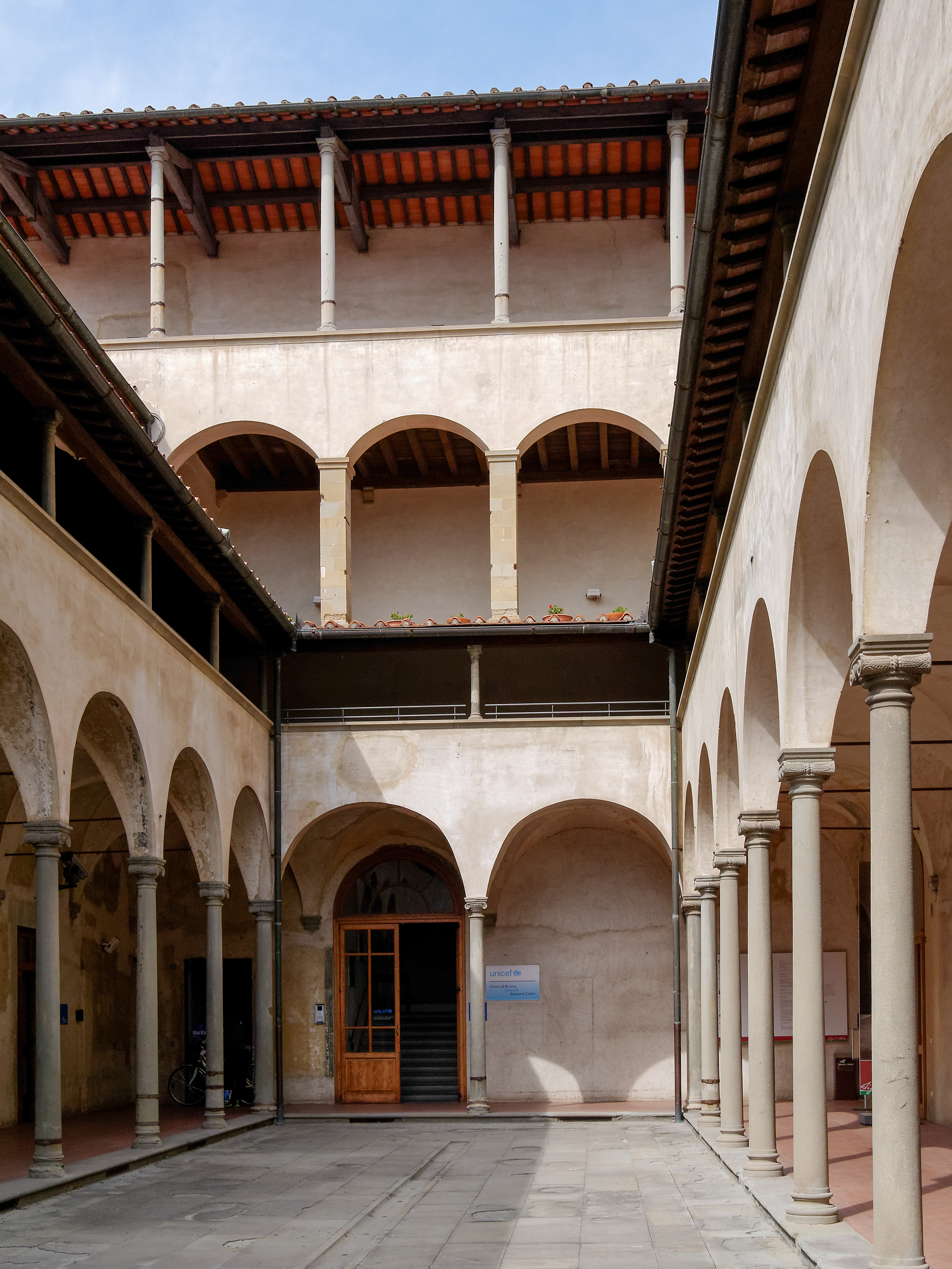
The rectangular women's cloister on the east side

In 1552, Vincenzo Borghini was appointed spedalingo (superintendent) of the Innocenti. He was employed by Cosimo de' Medici, Grand Duke of Tuscany. Borghini's education as a Benedictine monk molded the lives of children in the hospital. Borghini, after five months of becoming superintendent, wanted to get hold of the hospital's operai to eliminate wet nurses who defrauded the hospital. One of the main issues was that wet nursing increased the number of pregnancies. Some would resort to feeding the infants with cow or goat's milk. Mothers would sometimes abandon their own children to feed a child from the hospital. Others would even abandon their own children at the Innocenti, get hired as a wet nurse, and end up feeding their own child with pay. There was also continuation of salary from the hospital after the death of an infant.

There were three major years of great famine, 1556–57, 1567 and 1569–70. This was due to an imbalance between population and agricultural capacity. It was very difficult to reduce cost while balancing high admissions. During the sixteenth century, an increase in population impacted the Innocenti as well as high wheat prices. In 1557, there were also problems with maintaining supplies of grain since flooding occurred in the Innocenti's storehouse.

The hospital suffered from financial debt. The main problem was trying to balance expenses and revenues. Cosimo and Francesco had an unstable organization between private charity and finance and constantly over withdrew money. They had used the Innocenti as their personal charitable institution savings banks. The hospital's debt increased from 300,000 to 700,000 lire, however, its annual operating expenses were minimal (100,000 lire). Seventy-five percent of the hospital's debts were amounts owed to investors.

The consequences of the debt led to the dismissal of girls and boys. Borghini requested that the children be given to high status people of good reputation. Boys were dismissed at the age of eighteen. Girls were tried to be placed in noble families with increased dowries for those who wanted to marry. Women who did not become nuns nor married were trained for trade and manual labor.

== Contemporary use of the building ==
=== UNICEF ===
Since 1988 and as of March 2026 the building serves as the base of operations for the UNICEF Innocenti Research Centre, also known as the Global Office of Research and Foresight.

=== Art ===
Today the building houses a small museum of Renaissance art with works by Luca della Robbia, Sandro Botticelli, and Piero di Cosimo, as well as an Adoration of the Magi by Domenico Ghirlandaio.

== Legacy ==
- In E. M. Forster's 1908 novel A Room with a View, Lucy expresses her preference for "the Della Robbia babies" over Giotto in Chapter 2, and she later purchases several photographs of "some Della Robbia Babies" in Chapter Four.
- The United States Post Office (Berkeley, California), built in 1914–15, has been described as a "free adaptation" of Brunelleschi's hospital.

== See also ==
- Ospedale Niguarda Ca' Granda
- The Innocents of Florence
- Late medieval domes
