= Regina Saphier =

Regina Saphier is a Hungarian NGO founder, writer, blogger, TED video subtitle translator, and EleMentor. In 2003, she was the founder and director of the NGO Project Retour in her native Hungary. This was the first major repatriation project introduced in Hungary and has since been a model for the entire central European region, where a significant number of countries suffer from the effects of "brain drain."

== Education ==
In 1999 Saphier earned her Bachelor of Arts Degree with Honors from Oxford Brookes University Business School in Oxford, England, specializing in the field of Marketing Management (with a thesis in Social Marketing, Business Ethics, Corporate social responsibility). Saphier then went on to receive her Master of Arts Degree at Columbia University, Teachers College in New York in 2002. She holds the M.A. degree in Interdisciplinary Studies in Education whereby her research and studies synthesized International Education Development, Giftedness, Adult Learning, Leadership and International and Transcultural Studies. Saphier's studies in marketing together with the business ethics, communications, and grant writing informed her subsequent Project Retour initiative.

== Project Retour (2003–2007) ==
Project Retour was a grass roots, pilot project initiative focused on finding solutions to the "brain gain, brain drain, brain circulation" phenomenon that was occurring in Hungary It involved facilitating the return of migrant degree holders by returning young Hungarian citizens and professionals to Hungary from around the world by establishing global, local and virtual networks and communities through the media and via the Internet. Saphier was drawn to the project as she was a Hungarian who had left her homeland to study in the west. Though unlike many of her predecessors, she had decided to return to Hungary in order to bring her knowledge and expertise to bear at home.

Regina Saphier represented the project through over 50 interviews in local and international media (e.g. BBC World Television, Reuters, The Chronicle of Higher Education), and published articles in weekly and daily papers (e.g. Magyar Hirlap, Nepszabadsag). She presented and moderated in Hungarian and English at conferences, and also wrote the business plan and successful grant proposals in both languages.

In addition, she advised hundreds of adult homecomers in counselling sessions, interviewed homecomers and wrote case studies in English, based on narratives. She organized and moderated the first international homecoming conference in Hungary, supported by the creation of the first online community portal. Hungary is known to have a large emigrant population over several waves of emigration beginning primarily in 1956 during the Hungarian Revolution.

== TED ==
TED (short for Technology, Entertainment, Design) has been Saphier's focus for the last few years together with her freelance writing, publishing and consulting. She spends much of her free time writing Hungarian subtitles for selected TED talks on TED.COM and reviewing subtitles for other translators in Hungarian, German and French. She also has a TED conference blog.
