= International Journal of Pediatric Otorhinolaryngology =

- Discipline: Pediatrics, otorhinolaryngology
- Language: English
- Edited by: Robert J. Ruben

Publication details
- History: 1979-present
- Publisher: Elsevier
- Frequency: 15/year
- Impact factor: 3.2 (2023)

Standard abbreviations
- ISO 4: Int. J. Pediatr. Otorhinolaryngol.

Indexing
- ISSN: 0165-5876 (print); 1872-8464 (web)
- OCLC no.: 936514320

Links
- Journal homepage; Online access; Online archive

The International Journal of Pediatric Otorhinolaryngology is a peer-reviewed medical journal covering pediatrics and otorhinolaryngology. It was established in 1979 and is published 15 times per year by Elsevier. The founding and current editor-in-chief is Robert J. Ruben (Albert Einstein College of Medicine). According to the Journal Citation Reports, the journal has a 2023 impact factor of 3.2 .
