= Calley Means =

American businessperson and government official

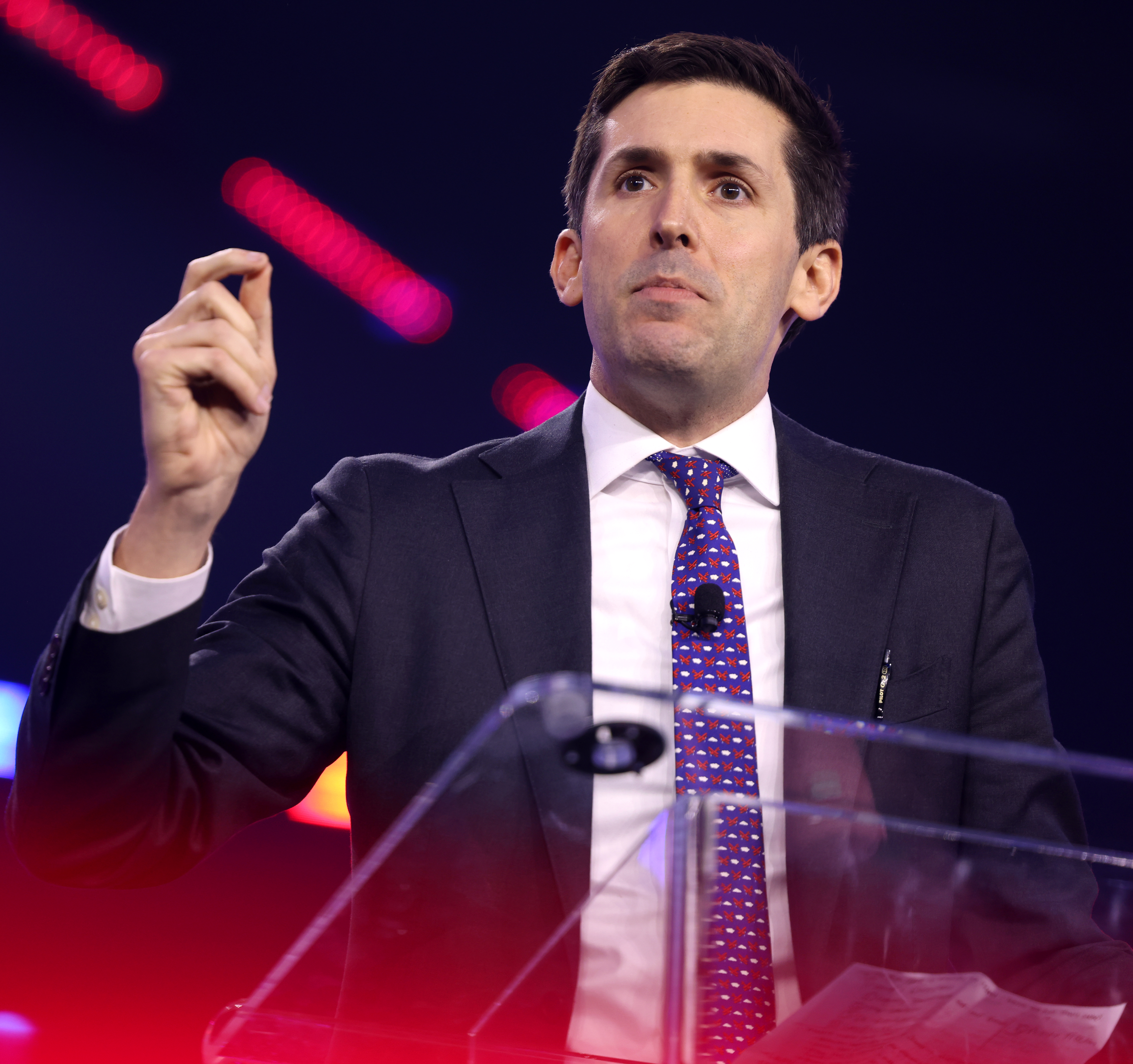
- Means in 2024
- Born: September 28, 1985 (age 41)
- Education: Stanford University (BA); Harvard University (MBA)
- Occupations: Health activist; author
- Employer: Federal government of the United States (2025–2026)
- Relatives: Casey Means (sister)

Calley Means is an American businessperson and government official. From 2025 to 2026, Means worked as a special government employee and a senior advisor for the United States Department of Health and Human Services.

== Early life and education ==
Calley Means was born in 1985 or 1986. Calley and his younger sister Casey Means were raised in Washington, D.C. He attended Stanford University, where he studied political science and economics, and earned a Master of Business Administration degree from Harvard University.

== Career ==
Means served as a White House intern during the second term of George W. Bush. He also interned for the Heritage Foundation before working as a consultant. He describes his experiences as a consultant on behalf of the food and pharmaceutical industries as his inspiration to fight against conflicts of interest within health regulatory bodies. While Means has described himself as a lobbyist, he has never registered as a lobbyist in the USA.

In 2022, Means founded Truemed, which enables tax-advantaged medical spending (i.e., flexible spending accounts (FSAs), health savings accounts (HSAs)) on health and wellness products and provides letters of medical necessity to qualify for eligible items. Media reports have alleged that Truemed's business model may not comply with Internal Revenue Service (IRS) regulation and that Means may have a conflict of interest in his role in the Department of Health and Human Services. Means has denied both assertions.

Means leads the lobbying organization End Chronic Disease, a coalition of executives from top wellness companies which was founded in 2024. End Chronic Disease advocates for policies to allow pre-tax medical spending funds to pay for health and wellness products.

Means and his sister Casey Means co-authored the 2024 book Good Energy: The Surprising Connection Between Metabolism and Limitless Health. The book helped them get a spot on The Tucker Carlson Show, as well as podcasts such as The Joe Rogan Experience, The Rubin Report, and The Doctor’s Farmacy with Mark Hyman. Means and Casey also participated in a live-streamed event hosted by senator Ron Johnson titled "American Health and Nutrition: A Second Opinion".

Means caught the attention of Robert F. Kennedy Jr. after appearing on a February 2024 episode of The Tucker Carlson Show. Both Means siblings advised Kennedy on healthcare policy during his presidential bid, eventually becoming surrogates for Kennedy's Make America Healthy Again platform within the Donald Trump 2024 presidential campaign. Means is credited with facilitating the Trump-Kennedy partnership, having arranged a call between the two candidates in July 2024 after the attempted assassination of Donald Trump in Pennsylvania. He served as an advisor to Health Secretary Kennedy during part of 2025.

Means resigned from his government position in October 2026.

== Personal life ==
In 2017, Means married Leslie Voorhees. The couple moved from San Francisco to Tempe, Arizona in 2022. That same year, his mother died of pancreatic cancer.

Means identifies as politically conservative. According to The Wall Street Journal, he initially described himself as a "Never Trumper" before deciding that the policy goals of Kennedy and Trump aligned.

== See also ==
- Make America Healthy Again
