= Jessica Winter (writer) =

American writer

Jessica Winter is an American writer. She is a staff writer at The New Yorker.

== Books ==
- Break in Case of Emergency (2016)
- The Fourth Child (2021)
- The rough guide to American independent film (2006)
