= Metabolism: Clinical and Experimental =

- Discipline: Endocrinology, metabolism
- Language: English
- Edited by: Christos Mantzoros

Publication details
- History: 1952–present
- Publisher: Elsevier
- Frequency: Monthly
- Impact factor: 13.93 (2021)

Standard abbreviations
- ISO 4: Metab.: Clin. Exp.

Indexing
- CODEN: METAAJ
- ISSN: 0026-0495
- OCLC no.: 1039251747

Links
- Journal homepage; Journal page at Elsevier website; Online access; Online archive

Metabolism: Clinical and Experimental is a monthly peer-reviewed medical journal covering all aspects of human metabolism. It was established in 1952 and is published by Elsevier. The editor-in-chief is Christos Socrates Mantzoros.

== Abstracting and indexing ==
The journal is abstracted and indexed in

- BIOSIS Previews
- Current Contents/Life Sciences
- Index Medicus/MEDLINE/PubMed
- Science Citation Index
- Scopus

According to the Journal Citation Reports, the journal has a 2021 impact factor of 13.93 and a current Cite Score (the equivalent of a 4-year impact factor) of 16.5 placing the journal in the top 3% of Endocrinology, Diabetes and Metabolism Journals.
