= Make America Healthy Again =

American political slogan

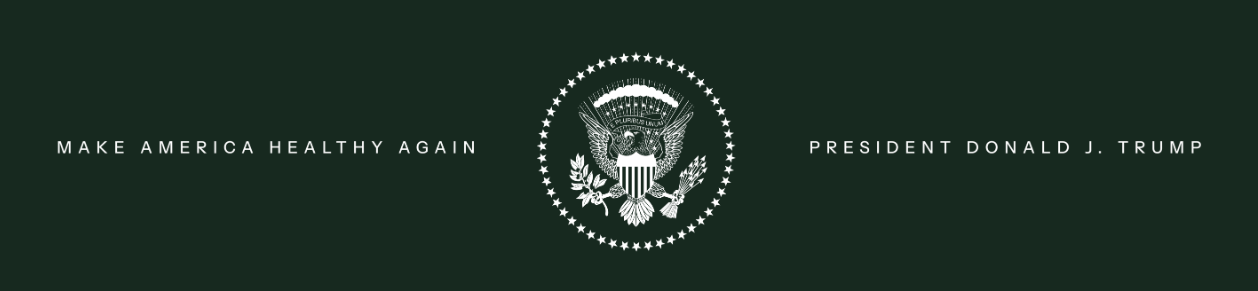
"Make America Healthy Again" logo used by the White House

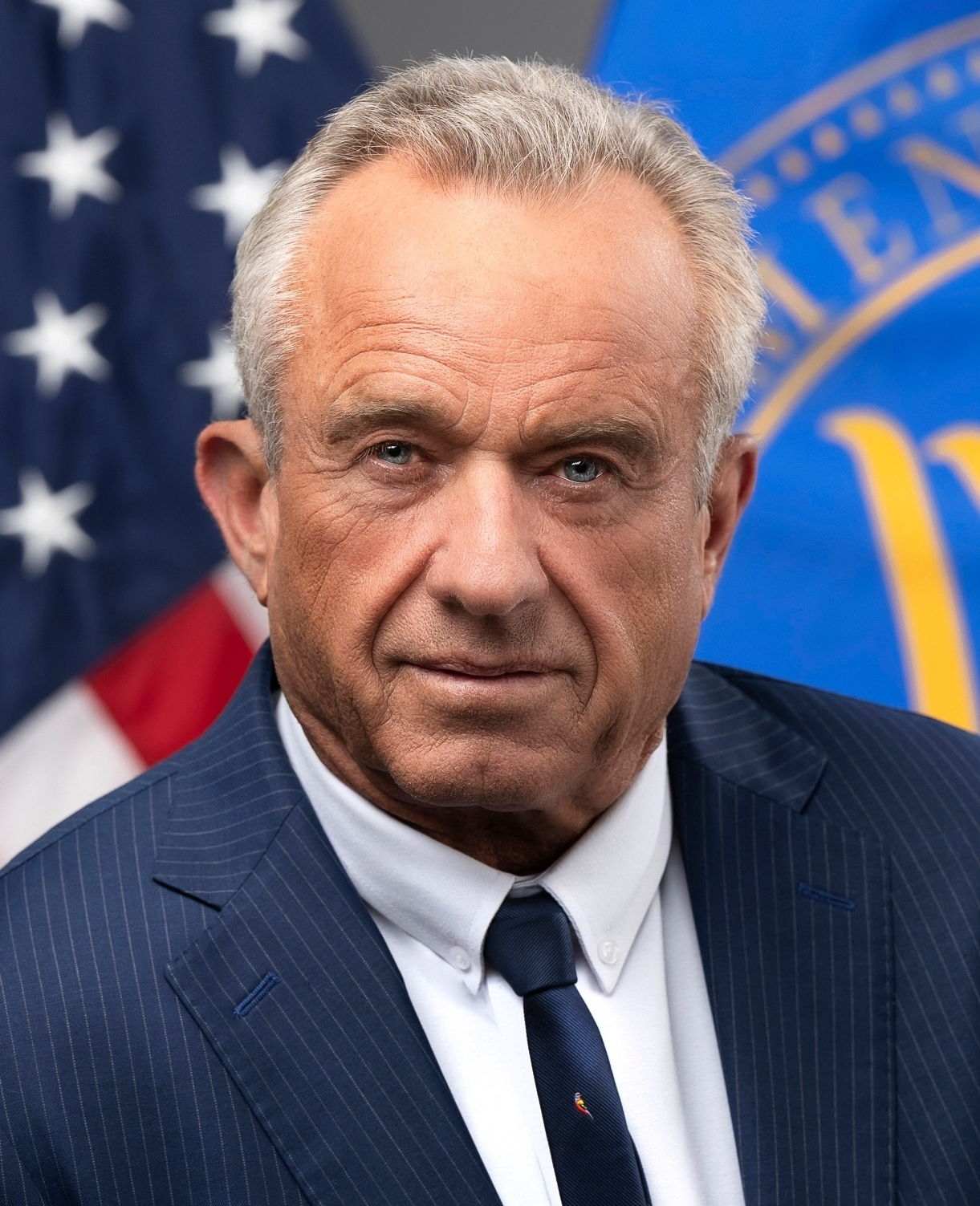
Robert F. Kennedy Jr., United States Secretary of Health and Human Services who heads the MAHA Commission

"Make America Healthy Again" (MAHA) is an American populist slogan and political movement associated with Donald Trump, who serves as President of the United States, and Robert F. Kennedy Jr., who serves as Secretary of Health and Human Services in the second Trump administration. The slogan, echoing the "Make America Great Again" phrase popularized by Trump and his ideology, reflects a focus on public health issues. MAHA gained broader attention after the suspension of Kennedy's independent presidential campaign in August 2024 and his subsequent endorsement of Trump.

MAHA is driven by belief that there is a chronic illness epidemic in the United States. Proponents of MAHA advocate for healthier lifestyle choices and contend that corruption in the food and pharmaceutical industries is a major source of health problems, with some suggesting increasing autism rates are caused by environmental effects (especially vaccines) .

In February 2025, President Trump established the MAHA Commission, chaired by Kennedy, to study psychiatric and anti-obesity medication, childhood diseases, and mental disorders. Its May 2025 MAHA Assessment cited poor diet, environmental chemicals, lack of exercise, stress, and overmedicalization as major child health concerns, while questioning vaccines, water fluoridation, and other public health measures. The Department of Health and Human Services released the "Make Our Children Healthy Again Strategy" in September 2025, proposing food regulation, SNAP restrictions on processed foods, removal of artificial dyes, scrutiny of pesticides, and drawing attention for omitting leading causes of childhood death and promoting conspiracy theories about vaccines, Wi-Fi, and 5G.

MAHA has received mixed support and criticism. Some proposals, particularly regarding food and pharmaceutical regulation, have received bipartisan backing. A January 2025 survey indicated that 30% of Americans supported and 42% opposed the movement, with higher support among conservatives. Scientists, medical professionals, and public health officials have criticized MAHA for promoting misinformation, misrepresenting scientific studies, promoting dangerous unfounded "cures", and aligning with anti-vaccine activism. Its policies and proposals have been described as anti-science, and several of its backers within and connected to the Trump administration have profited financially from products promoted by the movement. By late 2025, increasing measles and vaccine-preventable outbreaks were tied to anti-vaccine rhetoric spread by MAHA, leading to drops of public support for the movement.

== MAHA Commission ==
President Trump established the MAHA Commission by Executive Order 14212^{[ws]} on February 13, 2025. The commission is chaired by Robert F. Kennedy Jr. and includes other Trump officials, including secretary of education Linda McMahon and director of the Office of Management and Budget Russell Vought. Vince Haley, director of the United States Domestic Policy Council, is executive director. The order directed the commission to examine the "prevalence of and threat posed by the prescription of selective serotonin reuptake inhibitors, antipsychotics, mood stabilizers, stimulants, and weight-loss drugs" within 100 days. The commission was also tasked with researching childhood diseases and mental disorders, including autism. A few days after the announcement of the Executive Order, Kennedy stated that he would use the commission to critically assess childhood vaccine schedules and psychiatric medicines. Kennedy privately convened the committee's inaugural meeting in mid-March.

=== MAHA Assessment ===
The commission released the MAHA Assessment report on May 22, 2025. It addresses what the commission sees as the four main causes of health problems in children: poor diet, environmental chemicals, lack of physical activity and stress, and overmedicalization. According to The New York Times, Nancy Beck, the principal deputy assistant administrator of the Environmental Protection Agency overseeing the Office of Chemical Safety and Pollution Prevention, pushed to restrain mentions of pesticides in the commission's report. The Wall Street Journal reported that Kennedy's criticisms of pesticides drew ire from some Trump officials. Analysis of the MAHA Assessment report revealed multiple references to non-existent studies and authors, suggestive of the use of artificial intelligence, as well as mischaracterizations of the conclusions of real sources.

=== MAHA Strategy ===
The Department of Health and Human Services announced the release of the "Make Our Children Healthy Again Strategy" report on September 9, 2025. The Make Our Children Healthy Again Strategy is another part of EO 14212. The strategy document lists specific actions to implement findings of the MAHA report released in May 2025. A preliminary draft of "Make Our Children Healthy Again Strategy" did not mention the leading causes of childhood death, those being firearms and motor vehicle accidents, and was described by Ars Technica as "echoing long-held conspiracy theories and misinformation about Wi-Fi and 5G". It also cast doubt on the safety of water fluoridation and childhood vaccines.

== Policy ==
=== Animal testing ===
In late 2025, Kennedy announced that phasing out animal testing would be a component of the movement. Kennedy stated he was "deeply committed to ending animal experimentation," advocating for a shift toward alternative research methods.

As part of this initiative, Kennedy called for an end to the importation of monkeys for research and pushed for the retirement of primates currently used in laboratories. While the proposal garnered support from animal welfare advocates, it reportedly caused concern within the biomedical research community regarding the potential impact on drug development and medical innovation.

=== Food ===
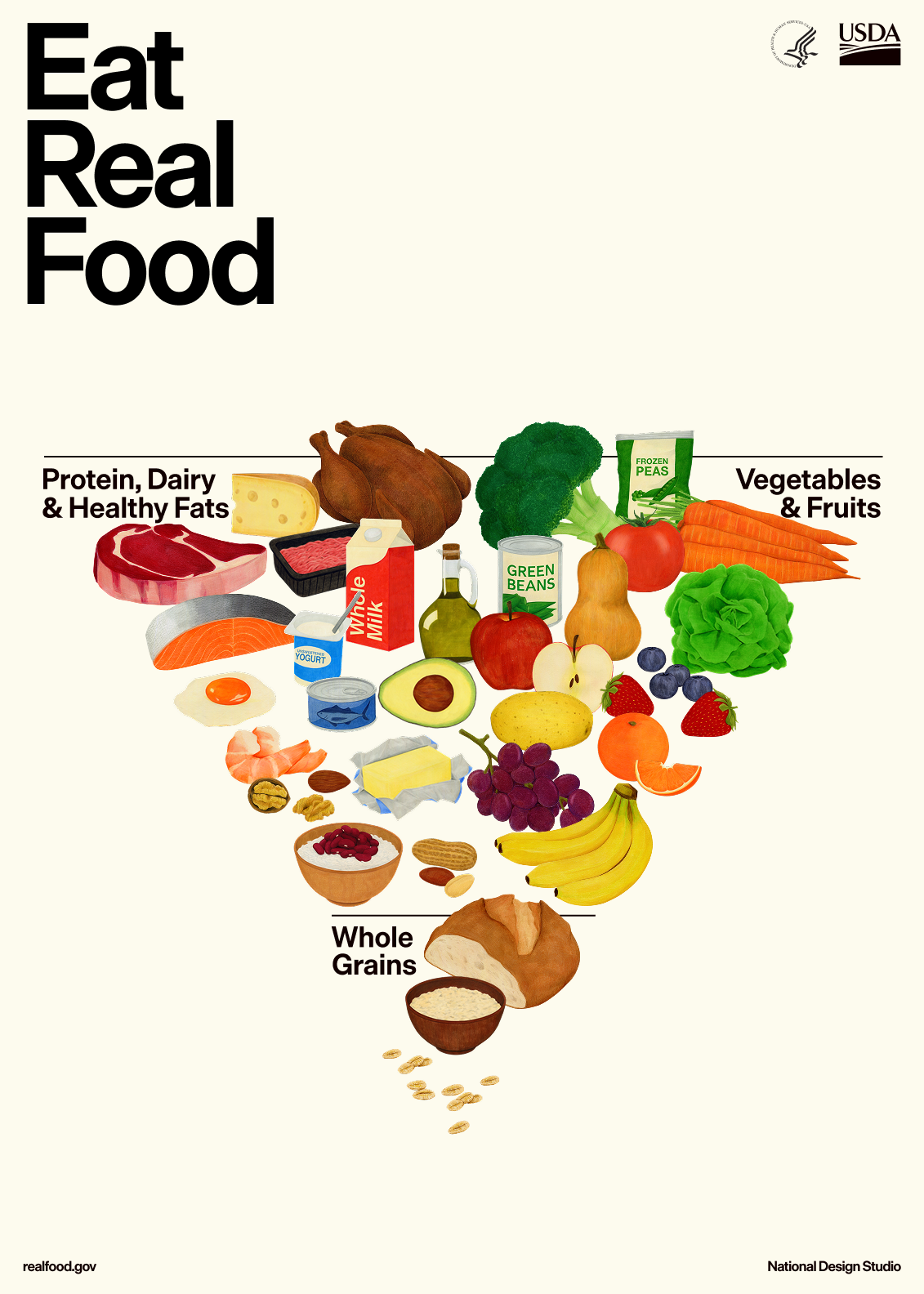
A poster from the "Eat Real Food" campaign from the Department of Health and Human Services

The MAHA movement places strong emphasis on food, specifically regarding the impact of ultra-processed foods on children's health and chronic disease prevention. Following the FDA's ban on Red dye No. 3 in January 2025, Kennedy announced that the FDA would be focusing on removing petroleum-based artificial food dyes from the American food supply by 2026. MAHA frequently criticizes glyphosate, and atrazine. The appropriations bill passed to end the 2025 United States federal government shutdown included provisions to eliminate rules preventing foodborne illnesses at farms and restaurants and limit the creation of rules regulating ultra-processed foods, which was noted to be in opposition to the administration's MAHA movement.

MAHA has campaigned against the consumption of seed oils and made misleading statements about their health effects. Kennedy has commented that "seed oils are one of the most unhealthy ingredients that we have in foods". MAHA promotes beef tallow as an alternative to seed oils.

==== Supplemental Nutrition Assistance Program ====
In 2025, Kennedy and Secretary of Agriculture Brooke Rollins support preventing Supplemental Nutrition Assistance Program (SNAP) recipients from using benefits for "processed foods and candy". Since that announcement, 23 states have had waivers approved to confine the definition of "food" under the Food and Nutrition Act of 2008 to restrict usage of benefits for "candy and soda". In June 2026, Amy Berman Jackson, a judge on the United States District for the District of Columbia, vacated approval for Colorado, Nebraska, Iowa, Tennessee, and West Virginia to alter their administration of benefits. Jackson found the Act did not give the USDA authority to approve these waivers or otherwise remove foods from SNAP coverage, only to carry out "experimental projects" to alleviate the consequences of obesity.

=== Vaccines ===
In May 2025, under Kennedy's leadership, the CDC stopped recommending the COVID-19 vaccine for children and pregnant women. The same month, HH&S halted a clinical trial of a COVID-19 vaccine pill. In June, Kennedy fired all 17 members of the Centers for Disease Control and Prevention's (CDC) Advisory Committee on Immunization Practices and appointed several prominent anti-vaccine activists. Increased anti-vaccine rhetoric by Kennedy and MAHA was tied to increased outbreaks of measles and vaccine-preventable diseases.

=== Water fluoridation ===
The movement opposes the addition of fluoride to public water supplies to reduce tooth decay. The public health practice reduces cavities in children and has been praised by dentists and public health experts. The World Health Organization, FDI World Dental Federation, American Dental Association (ADA), and Centers for Disease Control and Prevention (CDC) state that water fluoridation is safe and effective; it is regarded as one of the ten greatest public health achievements of the 20th century by the CDC. A majority of dental experts, including the ADA and CDC, disagree with Kennedy's views on water fluoridation.

== Organizations ==
Several organizations and groups bear the "Make America Healthy Again" name, including:

- MAHA Action (co-founded by Kennedy, now headed by Alex Hardy)
- MAHA Alliance (shut down in late 2025)
- MAHA Books (an imprint of Skyhorse Publishing)
- MAHA Center
- MAHA Commission (headed by Kennedy)
- MAHA Holdings
- MAHA Institute
- MAHA PAC
- MAHA Values (shut down in late 2025)
- MAHA Worldwide

Other organizations affiliated with the movement include:

- Brownstone Institute
- Children's Health Defense
- Health Freedom Defense Fund
- Hoosiers for Medical Freedom
- Make Texans Healthy Again
- Medical Freedom Act Coalition
- National Vaccine Information Center
- Stand for Health Freedom
- Texans for Vaccine Choice
- Weston A. Price Foundation

== Reception ==
A survey conducted in January 2025 by the Associated Press and the NORC Center for Public Affairs Research showed that 30 percent of Americans supported Kennedy's health agenda compared to 42 percent who disapproved, with support among conservatives being significantly higher. MAHA has been criticized by the mainstream medical community and news outlets, who have said that MAHA mixes promotion of healthy living with public health conspiracy theories, citing the movement's close ties to the anti-vaccine community. Critics have characterized the movement as a cult, with The New Yorker describing Kennedy as being viewed as a faith healer who "should not be criticized; a vast conspiracy threatens the movement; triumph is ongoing, even if the movement's crusade against dangerous pesticides and heavy metals in the soil and drinking water has culminated in the election of a President who apparently loves all that stuff". The New York Times described it as attracting a loose coalition of health-conscious moms, men's rights activists, and some environmental groups. It described traditional environmentalists as being "wary" of MAHA's controversial positions on vaccines and other issues. The Associated Press describes MAHA as anti-science, describing it as "fueled by a web of well-funded national groups led by people who've profited – financially and otherwise – from sowing distrust of medicine and science". Several individuals within and around the Trump administration promoting MAHA have profited financially from products endorsed by the movement. A study of MAHA-related posts on social media found that the movement started overwhelmingly positive, but experienced a substantial decline following Kennedy's nomination (2024-11-14), subsequent confirmation (2025-02-13), and the introduction of MAHA-aligned legislation in Texas (2025-03-03), ultimately reaching a point at which opposition outweighed support on social media.

Proposals of the movement, such as the increased regulation of food and pharmaceutical companies, received some early bipartisan support in late 2024 and early 2025, and were praised by Democratic Colorado governor Jared Polis and independent Vermont senator Bernie Sanders, despite both Polis and Sanders objecting to Kennedy's views on vaccines. Sanders called Kennedy's stance on the food industry "exactly correct" but described his broader health views as "extremely dangerous". In May 2025, the Democratic National Committee (DNC) criticized MAHA for citing sources in the report that did not exist. White House press secretary Karoline Leavitt told reporters Thursday that the citation errors were due to "formatting issues" and did not "negate the substance of the report." The errors were later updated. The DNC also referred to Robert F. Kennedy Jr. as a conspiracy theorist, arguing that with his help, "Donald Trump is putting millions of Americans' health care and safety at risk." By late 2025, Politico reported that increasing measles outbreaks and Kennedy and MAHA's anti-vaccine views were polling poorly with the public, with an October KFF poll showing 40% of parents who identified with MAHA did not trust Kennedy to give reliable information on vaccines, compared to 75% of non-MAHA supporting parents. It described efforts by Democratic politicians to paint Kennedy as a "boogeyman" and use MAHA's views against Republicans in the 2026 elections, especially after such attacks appeared to contribute to the Democratic victory during the 2025 New Jersey gubernatorial election.

== Impact ==
In October 2025, an Associated Press investigation found over 420 anti-science and anti-vaccine bills introduced in statehouses nationwide. It described the bills as being pushed by well-organized and funded groups attached to Kennedy, MAHA, and promoted by individuals within the Trump administration. At least one of four groups were attached to the majority of the bills promoted: MAHA Action, Stand for Health Freedom, the National Vaccine Information Center and the Weston A. Price Foundation. The groups were noted to be run by staff closely connected to Kennedy, and Kennedy's former group Children's Health Defense sponsored events run by NVIC and Weston Price. NVIC's research director was chosen as a new member when Kennedy purged the Advisory Committee on Immunization Practices. The report noted that cases of whooping cough and measles were making comebacks as vaccination rates fell as a result of anti-vaccine rhetoric pushed by MAHA and Kennedy.

In April 2025, food manufacturers agreed to remove food colorings Blue No. 1, Blue No. 2, Green No. 3, Red No. 40, Yellow No. 5, Yellow No. 6, Orange B, and Citrus Red 2 from American food products. The first six are commonly used in M&Ms, Froot Loops, Gatorade, pickles, chocolate milkshakes, and packaged mashed potatoes. These dyes being phased out are petroleum-based and FDA director Marty Makary encouraged manufacturers to use natural dyes instead. Multiple grocery stores required certain dyes be removed or voluntarily removing them on private-label products. Target moved to require all cereals sold in-store be made without artificial colors. Aldi and Sam's Club vowed to remove dozens of ingredients and synthetic dyes from their products.

== See also ==
- Health policy of the second Trump administration
- Neue Deutsche Heilkunde
