= ELTE Faculty of Humanities =

Faculty of Eötvös Loránd University, Budapest, Hungary

Eötvös Loránd University – Faculty of Humanities
- ELTE Bölcsészettudományi Kar
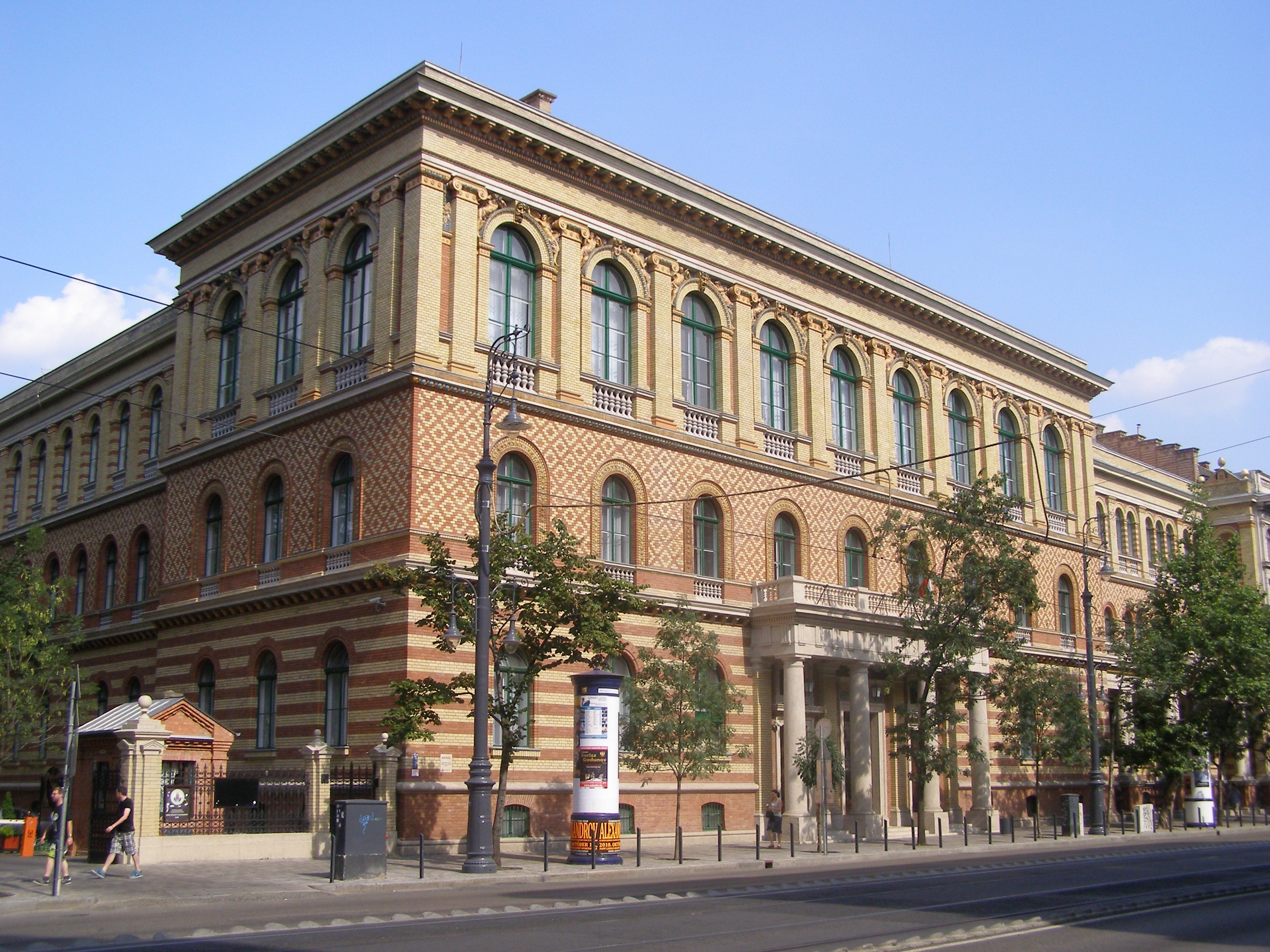
- The main building of the Faculty of Humanities.
- Established: 1635
- Dean: Dávid Bartus
- Academic staff: 589
- Students: 6960
- Location: 4 Múzeum körút, Budapest, 1088, Hungary
- Campus: Urban
- Sporting affiliations: Budapesti EAC
- Website: btk.elte.hu

The Faculty of Humanities is the oldest faculty of Eötvös Loránd University in Józsefváros, Budapest, Hungary. It was founded by the Cardinal Archbishop of Esztergom Prince Primate of Hungary, Péter Pázmány, in 1635.

== History ==
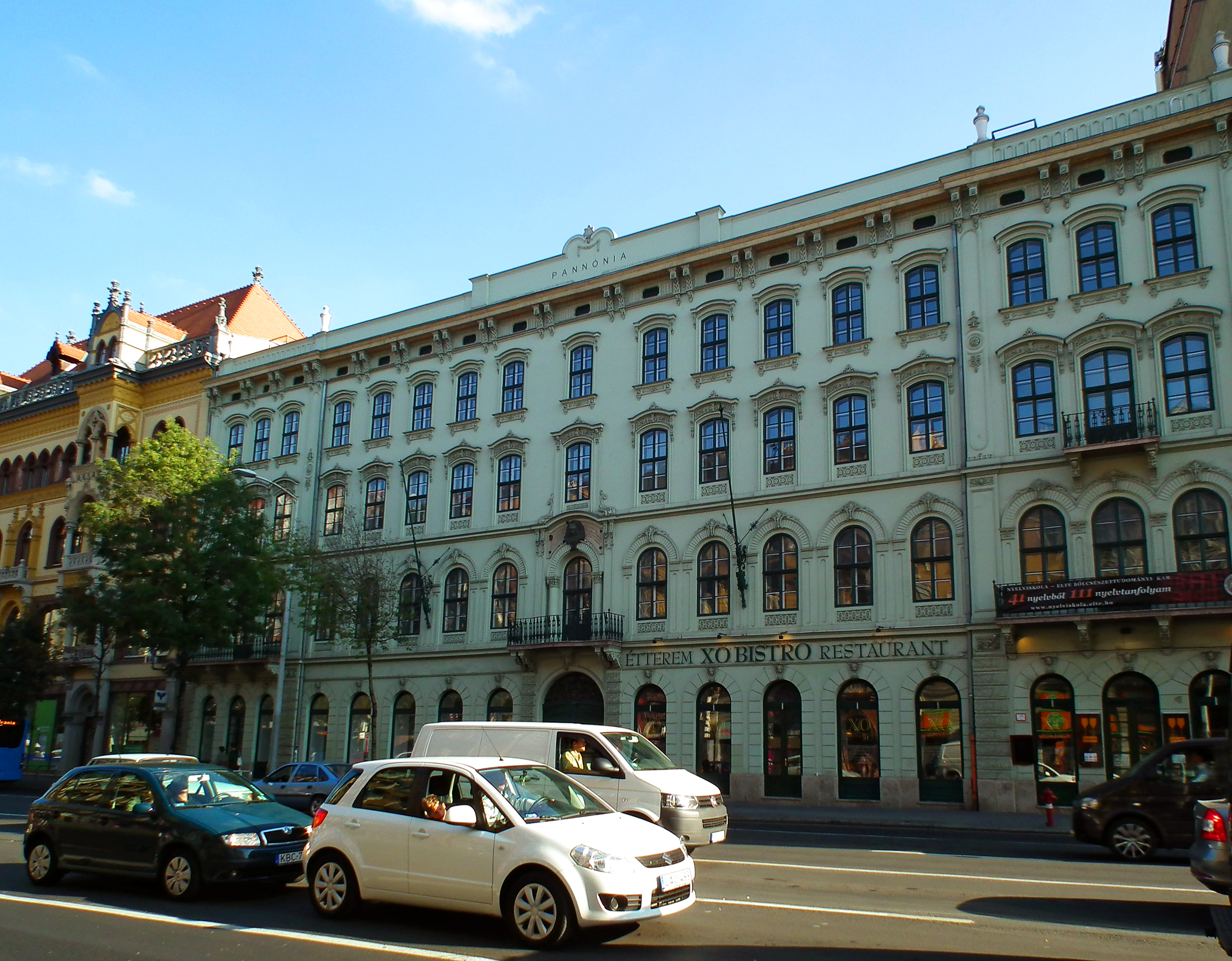
The School of English and American Studies is located at the Hotel Pannónia

The Faculty of Humanities of the Eötvös Loránd University was founded by Péter Pázmány, Archbishop of Esztergom, on May 12, 1635. The university was operated by the Society of Jesus and it consisted of two faculties: The Faculty of Humanities and the Faculty of Theology. At that time, students could obtain three academic titles: Bachelor's degree, Master's degree, and Doctor of Philosophy.

In 1770, the Faculty of Humanities adopted the reforms introduced at the University of Vienna. The university then became state-owned, and a dean and a director of the Faculty were appointed to monitor its functioning. In 1777, the Faculty of Humanities was moved to Buda, the western part of today's Budapest, along with the faculty of Theology and the Faculty of Law. However, the faculties were moved back seven years later.

The late 18th century also saw changes in the university. The changes closely followed the pattern employed at the University of Vienna, but the language of teaching remained Latin until 1844. The Hungarian Revolution of 1848 leading to a university reform program designed by József Eötvös in 1850, being implemented.

The Faculty of Primary and Pre-school Education was established in 2000. The Faculty of Psychology and Education and the Faculty of Sociology were created in 2003.

In 2018, Viktor Orbán's chief of staff announced that government would no longer finance any university programmes on gender studies.

In 2018, many institutes of the Faculty expressed their solidarity with the George Soros-founded Central European University.

On August 12, 2019, the Faculty's former student and professor, Agnes Heller, died.

On September 5, 2022, the Dean of the Faculty announced that the autumn break would be postponed to December and the exams would be held online due to the energy crisis caused by the Russo-Ukrainian war.

== Institutes ==
The Faculty of Humanities consists of 18 institutes:

Institute of Ancient and Classical Studies	Institute of Archaeological Sciences
Institute of Arts Communication and Music	Institute of Art History
Institute of East Asian Studies	Institute of Ethnography and Folklore
Institute of Germanic Studies	Institute of Hungarian Linguistics and Finno-Ugric Studies
Institute of Hungarian Literature and Cultural Studies	Institute of Historical Studies
Institute of Language Mediation	Institute of Library and Information Science
Institute of Oriental Studies	Institute of Philosophy
Institute of Romance Studies	Institute of Slavonic and Baltic Philology
Institute for The Theory of Art and Media Studies	School of English and American Studies

== Organisation ==
The current leadership consists of 1 dean and 4 vice-deans.

=== Faculty leadership ===
Title	Name
Dean	Dávid Bartus
Sub-dean	Ildikó Horn; Krisztina Horváth; Judit Bóna; Ildikó Horváth

=== Former Deans ===
- 1900–01: Frigyes Medveczky
- 1902–03: Imre Payer
- 1908–09: Oszkár Asbóth
- 1917–18: Ignác Goldziher
- 1925–26: Arthur Yolland
- 1927–28: Lajos Méhelÿ
- 1928–29: Antal Hekler
- 1932–33: Gyula Németh
- 1933–34: Gyula Kornis
- 1934–35: Zoltán Gombocz
- 1934–35: Gyula Németh
- 1944–47: István Hajnal
- 1956–57: István Kniezsa
- 1969–75: György Székely
- 2000–01: Sándor Fodor

=== Honorary doctors ===
The following people were awarded with Honorary titles by the Faculty of Humanities.

- 2020–21: (France) Marie-Vic Ozouf-Marignier, az École des Hautes Études en Sciences Sociales (EHESS) professzora
- 2019–20: (Germany) Claus von Carnap-Bornheimet, a Christian-Albrechts-Universität professzora
- 2017–18: (Austria) Waldemar Zacharasiewicz, professor of University of Vienna
- 2016–17: (Hungary) Miklós Szabó, professor emeritus
- 2016–17: Xu Lin, director of Language Education Council in China
- 2015–16: (Poland) Janusz K. Kozlowski, archeologist (professor emeritus)
- 2014–15: (Peru) Mario Vargas Llosa, Nobel prize winner writer
- 2013–14: (England) Robert John Weston Evans, professor of Oxford University
- 2012–13: (France) Dominique Combe, professor of École normale supérieure
- 2012–13: (United States) Harriet Zuckerman, professor of Columbia University
- 2012–13: (Germany) Reinhard Olt, correspondent of Frankfurter Allgemeine Zeitung in Budapest
- 2011–12: (Germany) Hans Ulrich Gumbrecht, professor of Stanford University
- 2010–11: (France) Jacques Roubaud, contemporary French poet, mathematician, member of Oulipo
- 2010–11: (Hungary) Ferenc Pölöskei, professor at Eötvös Loránd Tudományegyetem
- 2009–10: (Portugal) José Saramago, Nobel Prize-winning writer†
- 2008–09: (Hungary) Zsigmond Ritoók, professor emeritus

== Research ==
Currently, there are twenty-four research centres at the department level, institution level, and faculty level.

=== Notable researchers ===
Institute	Researcher
Institute of Ancient and Classical Studies	László Kákosy
Institute of Art History	Katalin Keserü
Institute of East Asian Studies	Mózes Csoma, Imre Hamar, Gábor Kósa, András Róna-Tas, Judit Vihar
Institute of Germanic Studies	Koloman Brenner
Institute of Historical Studies	Géza Alföldy, Ferenc Glatz, István Hahn, Antal Hekler, Gábor Klaniczay, Károly Marót, Tibor Szamuely, Gábor Vékony
Institute of Hungarian Linguistics and Finno-Ugric Studies	Katalin É. Kiss, Kinga Fabó, Géza Fodor
Institute of Library and Information Science	Tom Hubbard, György Sebestyén
Institute of Oriental Studies	Zsuzsa Kakuk, Gyula Németh, Edit Tasnádi
Institute of Philosophy	Bernhard Alexander, Géza Fodor, Ágnes Heller, Gyula Kornis, Ákos Pauler, József de Révay, József Szigeti
Institute of Romance Studies	Kálmán Faluba, Béla Köpeczi, Alexandru Roman
Institute of Slavonic and Baltic Philology	Mária Bajzek Lukács, Nina Király, Jerzy Snopek
School of English and American Studies	Zsófia Bán, Enikő Bollobás, Kata Csizér, Zoltán Dörnyei, Ágnes Gergely, Katalin É. Kiss, Zoltán Kövecses, Tibor Frank, Judit Kormos, Tibor Lutter, Péter Medgyes, Ádám Nádasdy, Miklós Szenczi, Arthur J. Patterson, Arthur B. Yolland

== Notable alumni ==
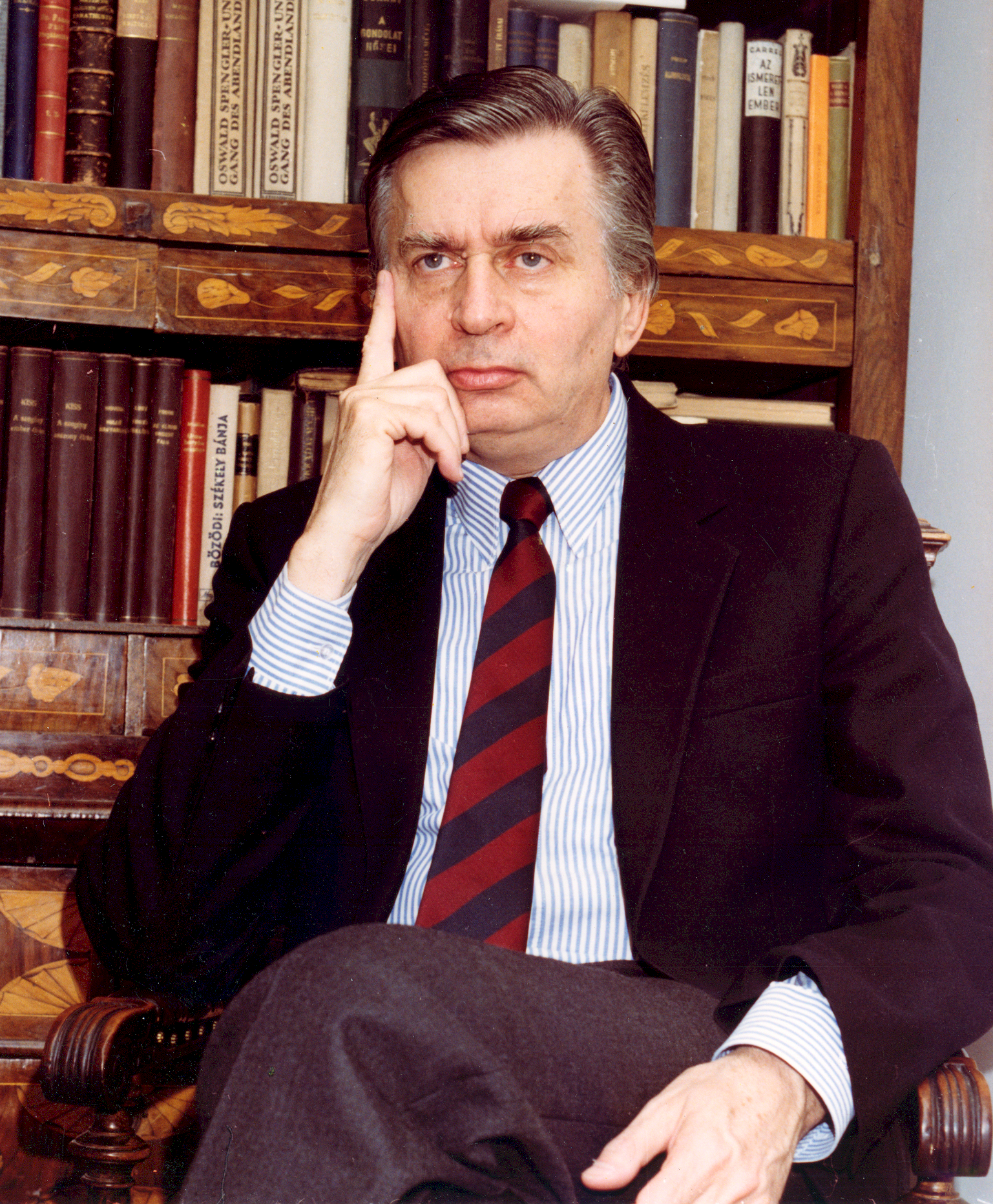
Prime Minister of Hungary, József Antall

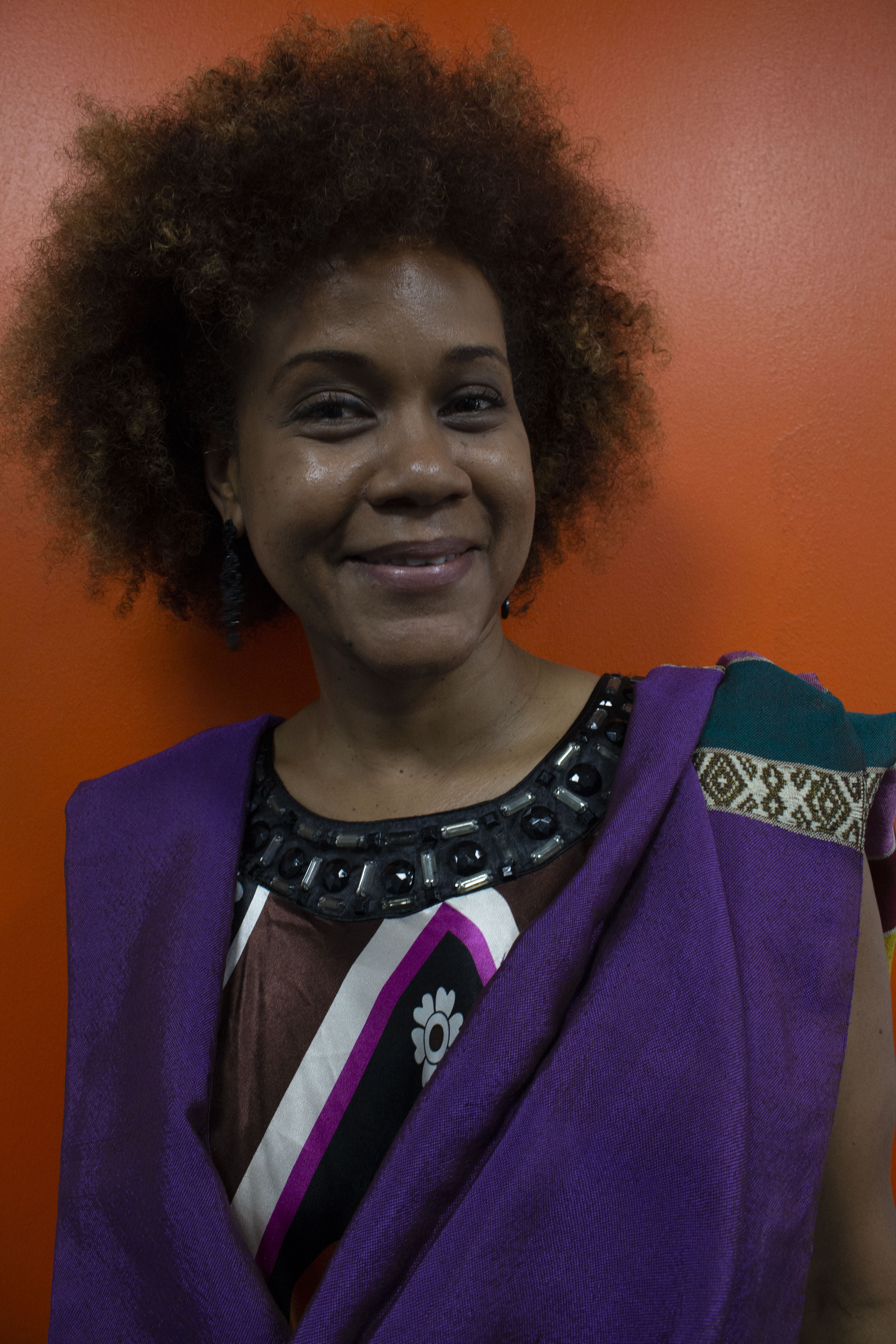
Maria Sarungi Tsehai

- Magda Ádám, historian
- Géza Alföldy, historian
- József Antall, Prime Minister of Hungary, 1990–1993
- Wilhelm Bacher, Jewish Hungarian scholar, rabbi, Orientalist, and linguist
- Erzsébet Bajári, entomologist, wasp researcher
- Zsófia Bán, writer
- György Bence, philosopher
- Therese Benedek, Hungarian-American psychoanalyst
- Nóra Berend, historian
- András Bereznay, historian
- Maria Berényi, historian and poet
- Jakob Bleyer, literary scholar
- Koloman Brenner, politician
- György Csepeli, psychologist
- Kata Csizér, applied linguist
- Mózes Csoma, koreanist
- Sándor Csoóri, writer
- Zoltán Dörnyei, applied linguist
- Ahn Eak-tai, Korean classical composer
- Péter Esterházy, novelist
- Kinga Fabó, poet, essayist, and linguist
- Endre Fülei-Szántó, linguist
- Alabert Fogarasi, philosopher
- Tibor Frank, historian
- László Garai, scholar of psychology
- Ágnes Gergely, writer
- Ferenc Glatz, historian (1964)
- István Hahn, historian
- Imre Hamar, sinologist
- Béla Hamvas, poet
- Pál Schiller Harkai, philosopher and psychologist
- Ágnes Heller, philosopher
- István Hiller, politician
- Rózsa Hoffmann, politician
- Zsuzsanna Jakab, director of the World Health Organization's Regional Office for Europe
- László Kákosy, egyptologist
- András Kenessei, art historian, writer and journalist
- Karl Kerényi, scholar in classical philology, co-founder of modern studies in Greek mythology
- György Konrád, novelist
- Judit Kormos, applied linguist
- Gyula Kornis, philosopher
- László Krasznahorkai, writer
- Viktor Kubiszyn, writer
- Endre Kukorelly, writer
- György Lukács, philosopher
- Tibor Lutter, literary scholar
- Bálint Magyar, politician
- Károly Marót, historian
- Péter Medgyes, linguist
- László Mérő, research psychologist and popular science author
- István Mészáros, philosopher
- Teodor Murăşanu, Romanian writer and teacher
- Ádám Nádasdy, linguist and poet
- Gábor Nógrádi, poet
- Eszter Ónodi, actress
- Raphael Patai, Hungarian-Jewish ethnographer, historian, Orientalist and anthropologist
- Ákos Pauler, philosopher
- Arthur J. Patterson, literary scholar
- Ágoston Pável, Hungarian Slovene writer, poet, ethnologist, linguist and historian
- Csaba Pléh, psychologist
- Karl Polanyi, philosopher and historian
- László Rudas, philosopher
- Mária Schmidt, historian
- Tamás Soproni, politician
- József Szájer, MEP (Fidesz)
- Miklós Szenczi, literary scholar
- Viktor Szigetvári, politician
- Ágnes Szokolszky, psychologist
- Stephen Ullmann, linguist of Romance languages, scholar of semantics
- Maria Sarungi Tsehai, activist
- István Stumpf, politician
- Gábor Vona, politician
- Moritz Wahrmann, politician
- Sándor Wekerle, three-time prime minister of the Kingdom of Hungary
- István Winkler, psychologist
- Arthur B. Yolland, literary scholar

== Library ==
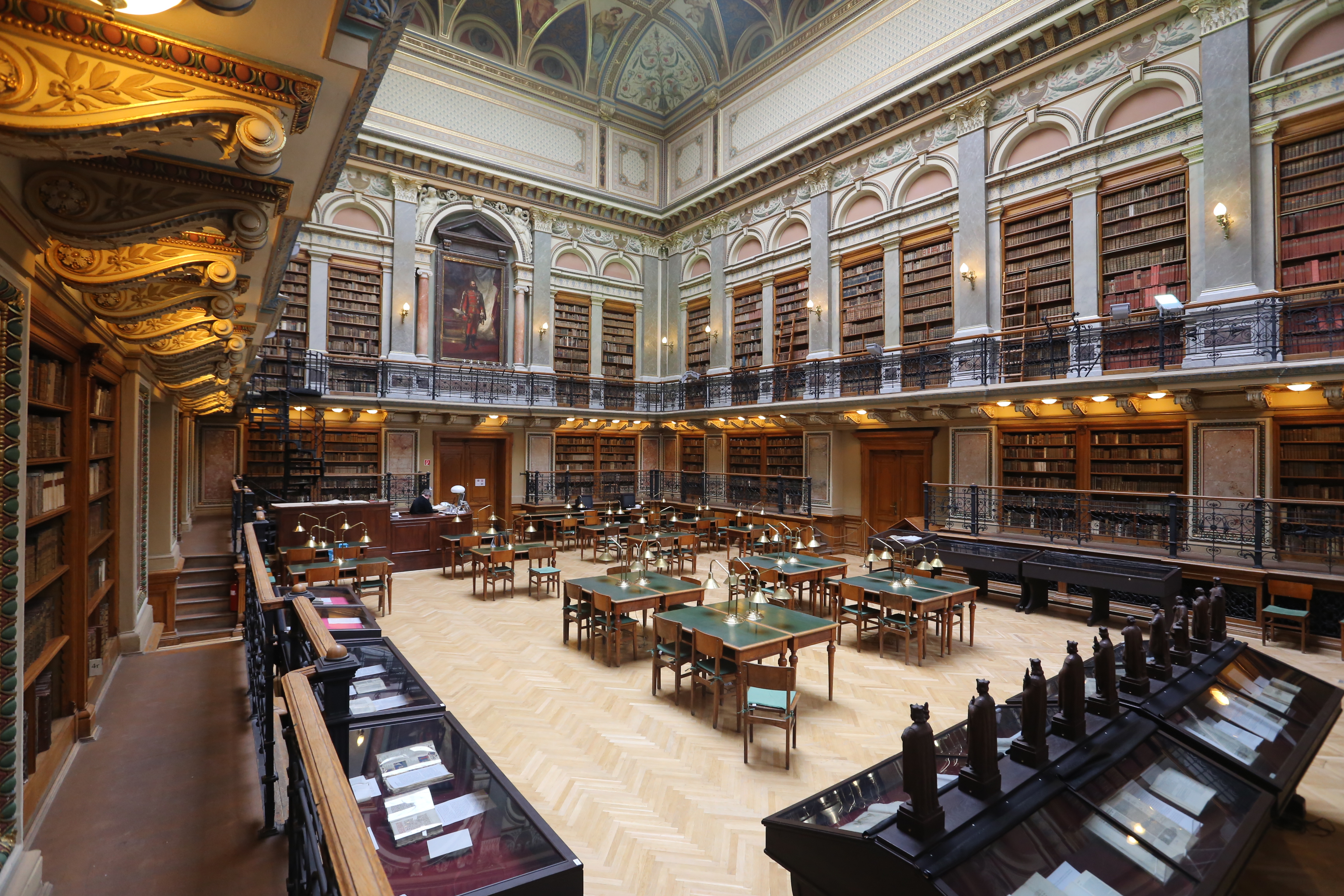
The library of the Faculty of Humanities

The Faculty has one main library, located in Trefort Garden, and 13 libraries at institutional levels. The Institute of Romance Studies has libraries at the departmental level.

- School of English and American Studies Library
- Institute of Philosophy Library
- Institute of Germanic Studies Library
- Institute of Library and Information Science Library
- Institute of Hungarian Literature and Cultural Studies Toldy Ferenc Library
- Institute of Hungarian Linguistics and Finno-Ugric Studies Library
- Institute of Art History Library
- Institute of Ethnography and Folklore Library
- Institute of Ancient and Classical Studies Harmatta János Library
- Institute of Archaeological Sciences Library
- Institute of Slavonic and Baltic Philology Library
- Institute of East Asian Studies Library
- Institute of Historical Studies Szekfű Gyula Library

The library of Medieval Studies of the Central European University was located in the building of ELTE's Faculty of Humanities.

== Gallery ==
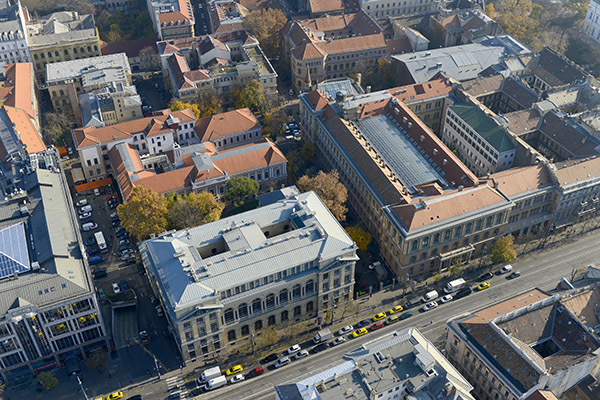
Bird view

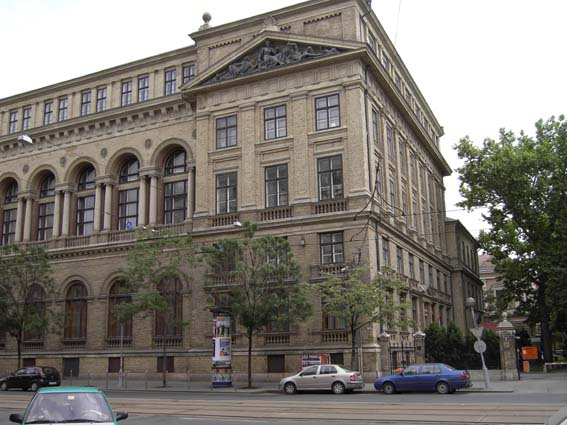
Main building
