= Edit Tasnádi =

Hungarian literary translator, turkologist

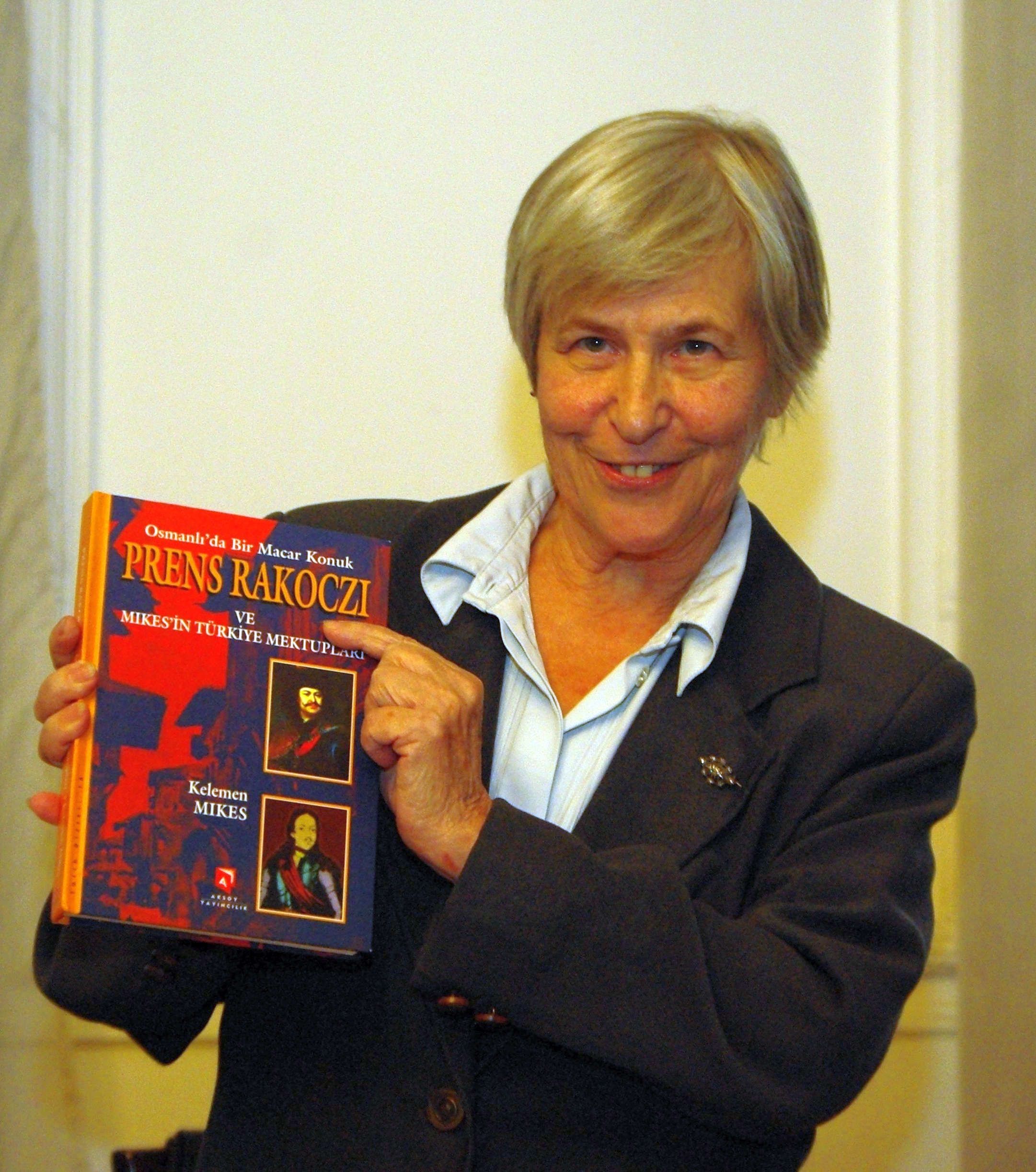
- Born: November 26, 1942 (age 83); Budapest, Hungary
- Occupations: orientalist literary translator academic

Edit Tasnádi (Budapest, November 26, 1942) is a Hungarian orientalist, translator & academic who has written poetry and short stories in Hungarian and Turkish.

== Life and career ==
Tasnádi majored in Hungarian and Turkish language and literature and graduated in 1967. She went directly to the Turkish Section of the Hungarian Magyar Rádió until it ceased to exist in 2005.

A radio broadcaster with thirty years of experience, she does not primarily consider herself a professional translator but a hobbyist pursuing recreation. She translated for high-ranking state officials and is also known for her extensive literary translations. In addition, she has written short stories and poems in both Hungarian and Turkish.

She taught Hungarian language at the Hungarian Studies department of Ankara University for five years, and then lectured at the Faculty of Humanities of the Eötvös Loránd University. She translated works from several well-known Turkish writers, including Orhan Pamuk, İskender Pala, Yaşar Kemal, İhsan Oktay Anar. She also extensively translated Hungarian literature to Turkish, from Kelemen Mikes, Bálint Balassi, Attila József and others.

Tasnádi worked in the Hungarian Radio Sound Archive until retiring.

One project undertaken by Tasnádi was the creation of a Hungarian-Turkish and Turkish-Hungarian dictionary. As a member of a small team that included her former teacher, Zsuzsa Kakuk, and two Turkish colleagues, Gülen Yılmaz and Benderli Gün, she helped prepare the medium-large dictionary for publication, which went on to win an Excellent Dictionary award.

== Awards and honours ==
- 1996 Milán Füst Award
- 1997 Nasreddin Hodja Grand Award (Turkey)
- 2009 Bálint Balassi Medal
- 2011 TÜRKSAV Award for her work as an orientalist
- 2012 Vámbéry Award
- 2016 Cédrus Művészeti Alapítvány Napút Hetedhét díja
- 2016 Hungarian Cross of Merit, Silver Cross
