= Géza Fodor =

Géza Fodor may refer to:

- Géza Fodor (mathematician) (1927–1977), Hungarian mathematician
- Géza Fodor (philosopher) (1943–2008), Hungarian art and literary critic
