= Berezney =

Berezney or Bereznay is a surname. Notable people with the surname include:

- András Bereznay, Hungarian-born cartographer and historian
- Paul Berezney (1915–1990), American football player
- Pete Berezney (1923–2008), American football player
