= Arthur J. Patterson =

British academic (1835–1899)

Arthur Patterson
- Born: 7 June 1835; London
- Died: 29 September 1899 (aged 64); Budapest
- Burial place: Fiume Road Graveyard
- Occupation: academic

Academic background
- Education: University of Cambridge

Arthur John Patterson (7 June 1835 – 29 September 1899) was a British academic and member of the Hungarian Academy of Sciences. He was an academic at the Faculty of Humanities of the Eötvös Loránd University.

== Life ==
Although Patterson was born in London, he was raised up in Radnorshire, Wales. In 1855, he went to study at the University of Cambridge. In 1859, he earned a Doctor of Philosophy. In 1862, he moved to the Kingdom of Hungary, then part of the Austrian Empire, and also learnt the Hungarian language. In 1873, he became a member of the Hungarian Academy of Sciences.

In 1886, he founded the Department of English of the Faculty of Humanities of the Eötvös Loránd University. From 1886 he was a professor at the Eötvös Loránd University.

In 1985, G. F. Cushing wrote about him in the Hungarian Studies in English volume.

He died in Budapest in 1899 and was buried at the Fiume Road Graveyard.

== Major works ==
- Patterson, A. J. (1859). An Indian caste (PhD thesis), London.
- Patterson, A. J. (1869). The Magyars: Their country and institutions. Két kötet. (Színes néprajzi térképpel. Ism. Vasárnapi Újság 1870. 26-28. sz.)
- Patterson, A. J. (1869). The new landlord. Uo. (Jókai Mór, Új földesúr, ford.)
- Patterson, A. J. (1834). Report on recent Hungarian Philology. Ugyanott, (lenyomat: Address of the President to philological Society-ból)
- Patterson, A. J. (1887). Dallos Gyula, Gyakorlati angol nyelvtan új tanmódszer alapján, mely szerint angol nyelven olvasni, írni és beszélni a legrövidebb idő alatt alaposan megtanulhatni. Tanodai és magánhasználatra. Negyedik javított kiadás. Budapest.
- Patterson, A. J., & Balassa, J. (1892). Angol nyelvtan és olvasókönyv iskolai és magánhasználatra. Ugyanott.
- Patterson, A. J. (1864). Utazás Erdélyben 1864 nyarán (English: Travelling in Transylvania in the summer of 1864) (translated: Kiss Sándor) Attraktor, Máriabesenyő, 2017 (Élet-utak)
