= Kinga Fabó =

Kinga Fabó (1 November 1953 - 4 March 2021) was a Hungarian poet, linguist and essayist.

== Brief biography ==
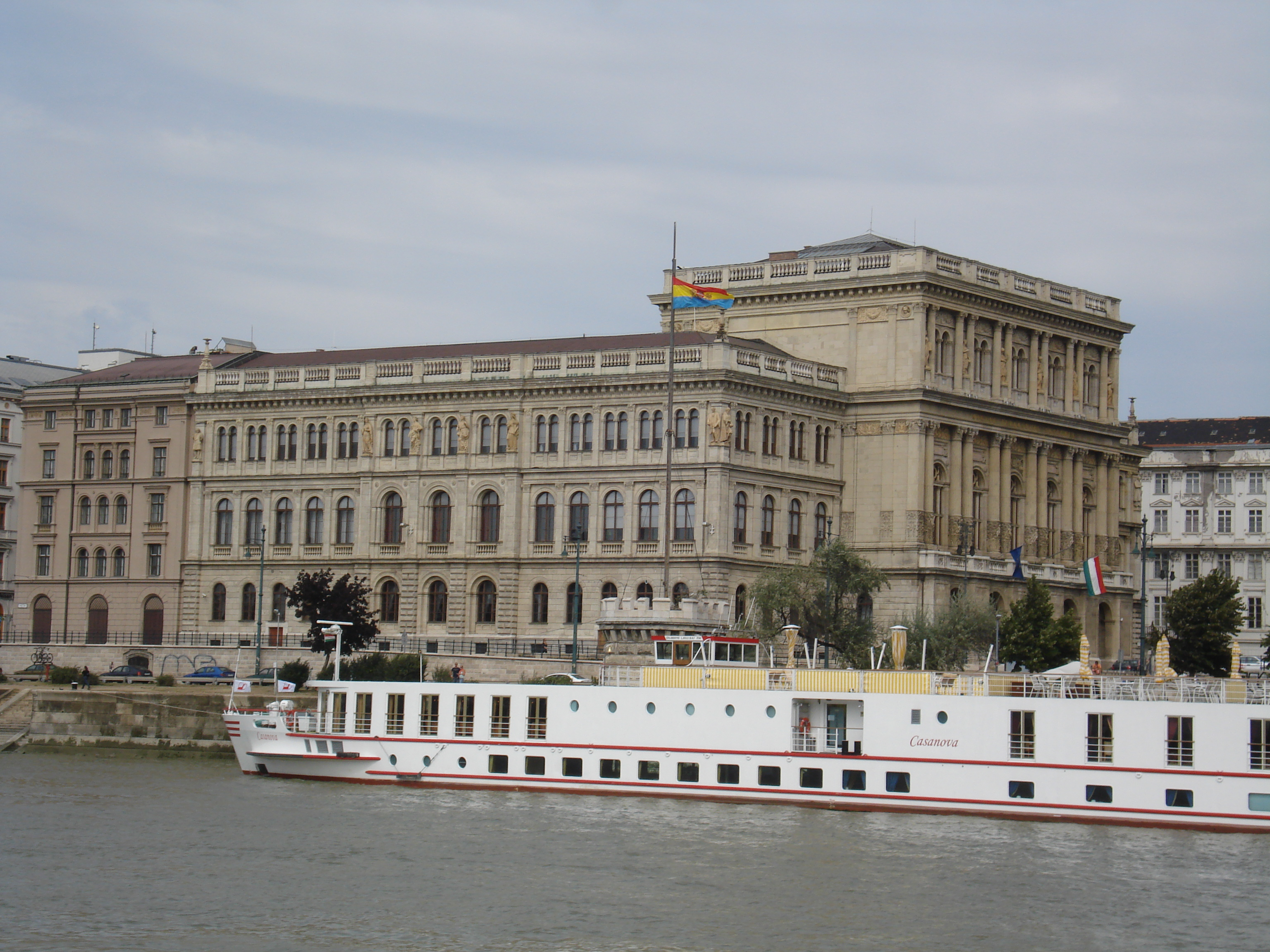
Facing the Danube River is the Hungarian Academy of Sciences, where Fabó was a linguistics professor for five years.

From 1972 to 1977, Kinga Fabó studied English at School of English and American Studies of the Faculty of Humanities of the Eötvös Loránd University. From 1978 to 1980 she was an associate professor of historical linguistics at that same university, and from 1981 to 1986 an associate professor of linguistics at Magyar Tudományos Akadémia (Hungarian Academy of Sciences). She has worked as a writer and poet, and has researched philosophy of language and critical approaches to literature. Some of her poems have been translated to English, Esperanto and other languages. She died at the age of 68 on 4 March 2021.

== Works ==
- 1980: Értékváltozások a 19. század második felében (Changes in values in the second half of the 19th century), Analysis of etiquette handbooks
- 1984: Maradj még idegen (Stay even stranger), radio play, directed in 1995 by Ferenc Grunwalsky
- 1987: A határon (On the verge), essays
- 1988: Anesztézia (Anæsthesia), poems
- 1992: A fül (The ears), poems
- 1994: Ellenfülbevaló (Against earrings), poems
- 1996: Elég, ha én tudom (I am enough to know it), poems
- 2002: Fojtott intenzitással, fojtottan (Suffocated with force), poems

== Essays and studies ==
- 1978: Gyakorító és mozzanatos képzôk a mai magyar nyelvben
- 1984: A szófajváltás
- 1985: Az aspektus egy lehetséges formális definíciója és jellemzése (Aspect - possible formal definition and characterization)
- 1986: A nyelvhelyességi szabályok jellege (Rules of natural grammar)
- 1986: Mindennapi élet, erkölcs, mûvészet (Everyday life, morality and art)
- 1993: Végrehajtja és elszenvedi. A hermeneutika mint a medialitás filozófiája (Performance and suffering: hermeneutics and philosophy)
- 1995: Névadónak lenni megnevezett helyett. Kertész Imrérôl
- 1996: Egy lehetséges posztmodern filozófia (A possible postmodern philosophy)
