= Zsuzsa Kakuk =

Hungarian linguist (1925–2025)

Zsusza Kakuk
- Born: 13 August 1925; Nagytálya, Hungary
- Died: 18 April 2025 (aged 99); Budapest, Hungary
- Other name: Suzanne Kakuk
- Education: University of Debrecen
- Occupation: Linguist

Zsuzsa Kakuk (13 August 1925 – 18 April 2025) was a Hungarian linguist and Turkologist.

== Biography ==
=== Early life ===
Kakuk was born in Nagytálya, Hungary on 13 August 1925. At age eight, her family moved to Eger, then later relocated to Szatmárnémeti.

=== Academic career ===
Kakuk studied at the University of Debrecen from 1944 to 1949 and graduated with degrees in Hungarian and Latin. She went on to pursue a PhD in 1951 at Faculty of Humanities of the Eötvös Loránd University where she studied under Gyula Németh. She graduated in 1955. Kakuk worked at Eötvös Loránd University from 1955 until her retirement in 1995. During this period she was also engaged in work at the Institute of Linguistics at the Hungarian Academy of Sciences.

Kakuk's interest in Turkology began with an interest in Ottoman Turkish loanwords in Hungarian. Later work involved visiting Turkish-speaking communities throughout the Balkans to examine their dialects. Other work included compiling an anthology of early and medieval Turkic texts and studying the folklore of various Turkic-speaking groups, including the Kazan Tatars and Crimean Tatars. During a visit to China in 1960, Kakuk was able to gather materials on the Salar language and provided some of the earliest descriptions of the language in Western academic literature.

In 1984 Kakuk founded the Hungarian orientalist journal Keletkutatás ISSN 0133-4778; she served as its editor-in-chief until 1994.

=== Death ===
Kakuk died in Budapest on 18 April 2025, at the age of 99.

== Selected publications ==
- Kakuk, Suzanne (1961). "Textes Salars" [Salar texts]. Acta Orientalia Academiae Scientiarum Hungaricae (in French). 13 (1/2): 95–117. ISSN 0001-6446. JSTOR 23656974.
- Kakuk, Suzanne (1962). "Sur La Phonetique De La Langue Salare" [On the phonetics of the Salar language]. Acta Orientalia Academiae Scientiarum Hungaricae (in French). 15 (1/3): 161–172. ISSN 0001-6446. JSTOR 23682797.
- Kakuk, S. (1962). "Un Vocabulaire Salar" [A Salar vocabulary]. Acta Orientalia Academiae Scientiarum Hungaricae (in French). 14 (2): 173–196. ISSN 0001-6446. JSTOR 23656705.
- Kakuk, Zsuzsa (1967). Kossuth kéziratai a török nyelvről [Kossuth's manuscripts on the Turkish language]. Kőrösi Csoma kiskönyvtár (in Hungarian). Budapest: Akadémiai Kiadó. OCLC 3518249.
- Kakuk, Suzanne (1973). Recherches sur l'histoire de la langue osmanlie des XVIe et XVIIe siècles; les éléments osmanlis de la langue hongroise [Research on the history of the Ottoman language of the 16th and 17th Centuries; the Ottoman elements in the Hungarian language] (in French). Budapest: Akadémiai Kiadó. OCLC 3206605.
- Kakuk, Zsuzsa, ed. (1981). Hungarian turcology, 1945-1974: bibliography. Budapest: Library of the Hungarian Academy of Sciences. ISBN 9789637301377. OCLC 12663012.
- Kasantatarische Volkslieder : auf Grund der Sammlung von Ignác Kúnos [Kazan Tatar folksongs: based on the collection of Ignác Kúnos] (in German). Ignácz Kúnos, Zsuzsa Kakuk. Budapest: MTAK. 1980. ISBN 963-7301-33-X. OCLC 7278253.
- Kasantatarische Volksmärchen [Kazan Tatar folktales] (in German). Ignácz Kúnos, Zsuzsa Kakuk. Budapest: Magyar Tudományos Akadémia Könyvtára. 1989. ISBN 963-7302-66-2. OCLC 21594978.
- Kırım Tatar şarkıları [Crimean Tatar songs] (in Turkish). Ignácz Kúnos, Zsuzsa Kakuk, Hasan Eren, Zeynep Korkmaz. Ankara: Türk Dil Kurumu. 1993. ISBN 975-16-0574-1. OCLC 31497963.
- Krimtatarisches Wörterverzeichnis : aufgrund der Sammlung von Ignac Kúnos [Crimean Tatar dictionary: based on the collection of Ignac Kúnos] (in German). Zsuzsa Kakuk, Ignác Kúnos. Szeged: SZTE Altajisztikai Tanszék. 2012. ISBN 978-963-306-178-7. OCLC 857986507.
- Kakuk, Zsuzsa (1996). A török kor emléke a magyar szókincsben [The memory of the Turkish era in Hungarian vocabulary] (in Hungarian) (1. magyar nyelvű kiad ed.). Budapest: Akadémiai Kiadó. ISBN 963-05-6979-5. OCLC 37878900.

== Academic service ==
- Vice President, Kőrösi Csoma Society (Hungarian Oriental Society), 1982-1988
- Member, Hungarian Academy of Sciences
- Member, Linguistic Committee of the Ph.D. Commission of the Ministry of Education and Culture
- Editorial Board Member, Acta Linguistica Academiae Scientiarum Hungaricae
- Editorial Board member, Studia Turco-Hungarica

== Recognition and honours ==
- Honorary Member, Türk Dil Kurumu, 1978
- Honoree, "Studia Orientalia Prof. Susannae Kakuk Septusgennariae Dedicata". Acta Orientalia Academiae Scientiarum Hungaricae. 48 (3). 1995.

== Bibliography ==
- Dávid, Géza (1995). "Professor Zsuzsa Kakuk". Acta Orientalia Academiae Scientiarum Hungaricae. 48 (3): 247–250. ISSN 0001-6446. JSTOR 43391221.
- "Bibliography of Zsuzsa Kakuk". Acta Orientalia Academiae Scientiarum Hungaricae. 48 (3): 251–259. 1995. ISSN 0001-6446. JSTOR 43391222.
