= Ágnes Gergely =

Hungarian writer, educator, journalist and translator

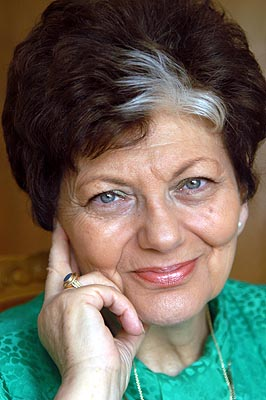
- Ágnes Gergely
- Born: Ágnes Guttmann; October 5, 1933 (age 92); Endrőd, Hungary
- Education: University of Budapest
- Occupations: Poet; writer; educator; journalist; translator
- Writing career
- Genres: Poetry, prose, essay, translation
- Notable works: A tolmács (The interpreter, 1973); Ajtófélfámon jel vagy (Sign on my door jamb, 1963)

Ágnes Gergely (born 5 October 1933) is a Hungarian poet, writer, educator, journalist and translator.

== Biography ==
She was born Ágnes Guttmann in family of Fenákel Rózsika and György Guttmann in Endrőd, a village on the Great Hungarian Plain. She took her pen name "Gergely" from the novel Eclipse of the Crescent Moon by the Hungarian writer Géza Gárdonyi because Agnes Gergely wished to be courageous like the hero from the story, Gergely Bornemissza.

Her father György Guttmann was murdered in the Holocaust.

She began work in a factory in 1950 but later went on to study Hungarian and English literature at the Faculty of Humanities of the University of Budapest. She taught secondary school, was a radio producer and was feature editor for the weekly literary magazine Nagyvilág. From 1973 to 1974, Gergely took part in the International Writing Program at the University of Iowa. She also has translated English and American works into Hungarian and has lectured on English literature at Eötvös Loránd University.

In 1963, she published her first poetry collection Ajtófélfámon jel vagy (Sign on my door jamb).

Ágnes Gergely published her first novel A tolmács (The interpreter) in 1973, a story about tragedy of Jewish community during Nazist regime.

Gergely was awarded the Attila József Prize in 1977 and 1987 and the Kossuth Prize in 2000.
