= Kálmán Faluba =

Hungarian philologist (born 1941)

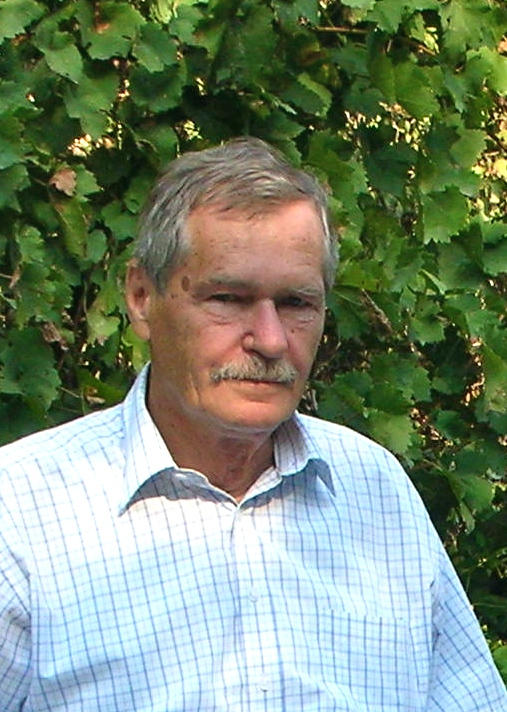
- Kálmán Faluba
- Born: 17 September 1941; Budapest
- Education: Eötvös Loránd University
- Occupation: Philologist
- Known for: Translations of the works of Ramon Llull to Hungarian, Co-author of the first Catalan–Hungarian dictionary.

Kálmán Faluba (Budapest, Hungary, 17 September 1941) is a Hungarian philologist whose work has helped to make the Catalan language more well-known in his country.

== Education ==
Faluba studied Hispanic and Italian philology at Faculty of Humanities of the Eötvös Loránd University in Budapest, where he currently lectures. After completing his studies in Catalan with a grammar written by Antoni Badia i Margarit, in 1971 he helped to make Catalan language and literature part of an official degree programme in Hungary's higher education system, which in turn led to the creation of a national-level group of Catalan language enthusiasts. One of the founding members of the Associació Internacional de Llengua i Literatura Catalanes (International Association of Catalan Language and Literature), created in 1973, Faluba also took part in the Second International Congress on the Catalan Language in 1986. He has published Hungarian translations of two works by the thirteenth-century Catalan scholar and mystic Ramon Llull: Llibre d'Amic e Amat and L'Arbre de filosofia d'amor (1994).

A member of the editorial team that produces the Journal of Catalan Studies (Revista Internacional de Catalanística), Faluba has published extensively on linguistics (grammar and lexicography), the history of literature, the status of Catalan and of other languages spoken in Spain and on the relationship between Catalan and his own country. In 1990 he was awarded the Government of Catalonia's Creu de Sant Jordi and, in 1992, he was appointed member of the Philological Section of the Institute for Catalan Studies. Together with Károly Morvay he produced one of the first Catalan–Hungarian dictionaries (1990) and Hungarian–Catalan dictionaries (1996), for which the two men were awarded the Premi Catalònia of the Institute for Catalan Studies. In 1993 he also received the Government of the Balearic Islands' Ramon Llull Prize. From 2006 to 2012 Faluba was president of the Associació Internacional de Llengua i Literatura Catalanes, following Albert Hauf. He was succeeded by Antoni Ferrando.

== Works ==
- Diccionari català-hongarès (1990), with Károly Morvay
- Diccionari hongarès-català (1996)
- Guia de conversa català-francès (1993)
- Guida alla conversazione italiano, catalano, spagnolo (1994)
- Literatura hongaresa i literatura catalana: coneixement mutu (2004)
