= László Kákosy =

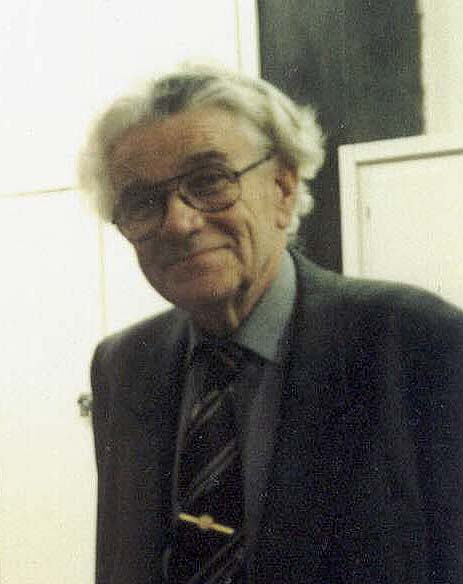
Professor Kákosy

Dr. László Kákosy (Budapest, 15 August 1932 – Budapest, 29 January 2003) was a Hungarian Egyptologist, a member of the Hungarian Academy of Sciences. He is one of the most esteemed Hungarian egyptologists and was the author and translator of several books and publications.

== Education ==
He went to the Ferenc Rákóczi High School between 1947–1951 then studied archaeology at Faculty of Humanities of the Eötvös Loránd University where he received a degree in 1956. He spent the next three years working at the Egyptology department of the Hungarian Museum of Fine Arts.

== Career ==
In 1960 he started teaching at the Egyptology department of Eötvös University, and from 1972 he was the senior lecturer at the department. In 1974 he received his doctoral degree (thesis title: Világnézet és valláspolitika az egyiptomi Újbirodalom idején és a későkorban – "Worldview and religious politics during the Egyptian New Kingdom and Late Period"). He was a corresponding member of the Hungarian Academy of Sciences (from 1998; the title of his inaugural speech was Théba a Ptolemaiosz- és a római korban – "Thebes in the Ptolemaic and Roman times") and of the Heidelberger Akademie der Wissenschaften. He started the excavations of the Theban tomb of Djehutimes (TT32), and was the leader of the expedition until his death.

Professor Kákosy was married to poet and translator Éva Grigássy (1925–2002).

== Selected publications ==
- Ré fiai ("Sons of Re"; Budapest, 1979); later re-published as
  - Az ókori Egyiptom története és kultúrája ("History and Culture of Ancient Egypt" – Osiris Kiadó, Budapest, 1998, ISBN 963 379 371 8; ISSN 1218-9855)
- Varázslás az ókori Egyiptomban ("Magic in Ancient Egypt"; Budapest, 1969)
- Egy évezred a Nílus völgyében Memphisz az Óbirodalom korában ("A Millennium in the Nile Valley: Memphis in the Old Kingdom"; with Edith Varga, Budapest, 1970)
- A gyönyörűség dalainak kezdete: óegyiptomi szerelmes versek ("The Beginnings of the Songs of Beauty: Ancient Egyptian Love Poems"; translated from ancient Egyptian; Budapest, 1974)
- Fény és káosz: A kopt gnósztikus kódexek ("Light and Chaos: The Coptic Gnostic Codices", Budapest, 1984)
- Az alexandriai időisten válogatott tanulmányok, 1957-1998 ("The Time God of Alexandria: Selected Publications 1957–1998)" Budapest, 2001)
- The mortuary monument of Djehutymes TT 32 (Budapest, 2004)
- Egyiptomi és mezopotámiai regék és mondák ("Egyptian and Mesopotamian Stories and Legends"; with Aladár Dobrossy)

== Sources ==
- In memoriam Kákosy László (Hungarian)
- Professzor Kákosy László (Hungarian)
