= Imre Hamar =

Imre Hamar is a professor of Chinese studies at Faculty of Humanities of the Eötvös Loránd University (Budapest). Hamar is also specialist in Huayan Buddhism. He is also the president of Budapesti EAC.

== Biography ==
Born in Győr (Hungary), 1 April 1967. By 1992, he had MA degree of Eötvös Loránd University (Chinese and Tibetan). Imre Hamar has been notably dedicated to the Chinese language teaching and research. Since 2006, he has been the director of the Confucius Institute at Eötvös Loránd University.

== See also ==
- List of Sinologists
