= Katalin É. Kiss =

Hungarian linguist

Katalin É. Kiss (born 31 May 1949 in Debrecen) is a Hungarian linguist. She is a professor at the Research Institute for Linguistics of the Hungarian Academy of Sciences, in Budapest.

== Education ==
She earned her PhD and her habilitation at the Hungarian Academy of Sciences, in 1979 and 1991, respectively.

== Research ==
Between 1979 and 1986, she worked at the Faculty of Humanities of the Eötvös Loránd University. Since 1986, she has been a research professor at the Hungarian Research Centre for Linguistics.

Her field of research includes generative Syntax, and Hungarian syntax. She is best known for her work on information structure and discourse configurationality, in Hungarian and other languages.

== Recognition ==
É. Kiss has received a number of awards and honors, including the New Europe Prize, Princeton (1994), a Mellon Fellowship (Center for Advanced Study in the Behavioral Sciences, Stanford, 1992–1993). Since 2005 she is a member of the Academy of Europe. In 2021 she was elected a corresponding fellow of the British Academy.

She also serves on the editorial board of prestigious linguistics journals, such as:

- 2010 – editor of Acta Linguistica Hungarica; member of the editorial board since 1998
- 2001 – associate editor of Theoretical Linguistics
- 1992 – member of the editorial board of The Linguistic Review

Katalin É. Kiss also features twice as an example of orthography in the Chicago Manual of Style 16th edition (2010) which uses her name as an example of a Hungarian surname beginning with an initial "É. Kiss", not "Kiss". This kind of surname is categorized under the initial "É." in indexes, not under "K.". Hungarian names do not typically have middle names.

== Family ==
Her father is the academician É. Kiss Sándor.

== Key publications ==
- É. Kiss, Katalin. 1987. Configurationality in Hungarian. Springer. ISBN 978-94-009-3703-1
- É. Kiss, Katalin. 2002. Syntax of Hungarian. Cambridge University Press. doi:10.1017/CBO9780511755088
- É. Kiss, Katalin (editor). 2005. Universal Grammar in the Reconstruction of Ancient Languages ISBN 978-3-11-018550-8
