= Zsófia Bán =

Hungarian writer, literary historian, art and literature critic

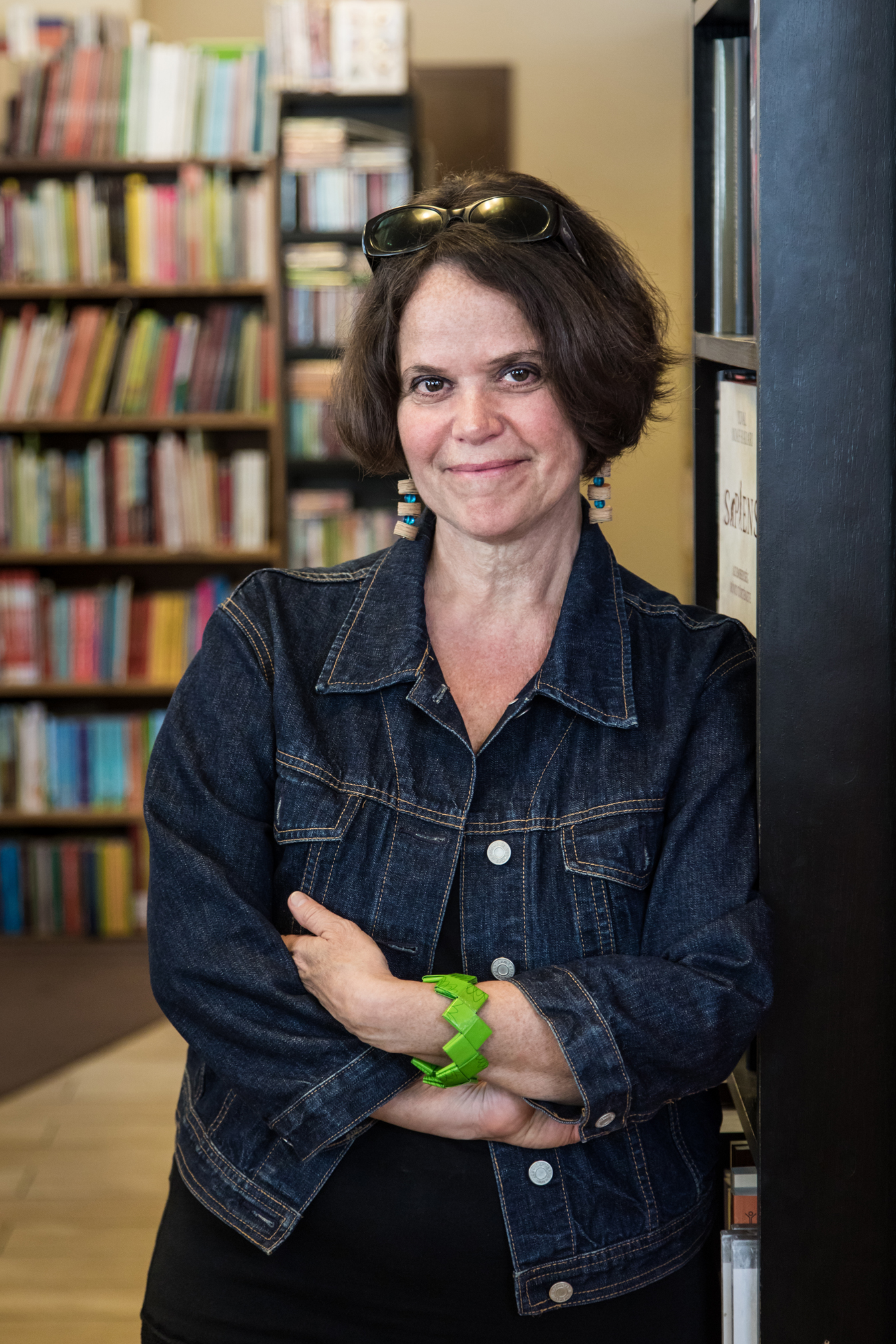
Bán in 2018

Zsófia Bán (born September 23, 1957) is a Hungarian writer, literary historian, essayist and art and literature critic.

== Personal life ==
Zsófia Bán was born on September 23, 1957, in Rio de Janeiro, Brazil, as the child of Jewish parents. She grew up there, and in 1969, she and her family returned to Hungary where she studied English language and Literature as well as Romance Studies in Budapest (1976–1981), Lisbon, Minneapolis and New Brunswick. She has worked in film studios, curated art exhibitions, was a fellow at the Hungarian Academy of Sciences and at the John-F.-Kennedy-Institut in Berlin, a Fulbright Fellow at Harvard University, as well as a writer-in-residence in Zug, Switzerland, among other residencies. From August 2015 to July 2016 Bán was a writer-in-residence at the DAAD (German Academic Exchange Service) Artists-in-Berlin Program. In December 2024 she was chosen as a member of the Széchenyi Academy of Literature and Arts.

She lives and works in Budapest, where she was an associate professor of American Studies at the School of English and American Studies of the Faculty of Humanities of the Eötvös Loránd University. She is now a freelance writer.

== Writing ==
Zsófia Bán's writing often addresses topics related to visuality, visual arts, photography, personal and cultural memory, historical trauma, as well as gender. She has written a number of essays related to the topic of literature and visuality, including those on W. G. Sebald, Susan Sontag, Imre Kertész and Péter Nádas. Her short stories and essays have been widely anthologized, and translated to a number of languages, including German, English, Spanish, Portuguese, Czech, Slovak and Slovene.

== Bibliography ==
=== Fiction ===
- Alétheia él. Budapest, Magvető, 2025. ISBN 978-963-14-4556-5
- Lehet lélegezni!, Budapest, Magvető, 2018.
  - Weiter atmen, übersetzt von Terézia Mora. Berlin, Suhrkamp Verlag, 2020. ISBN 978-3-518-42909-9.
- Amikor még csak az állatok éltek, Magvető, Budapest 2012. ISBN 978-96-31430-10-3
  - Als nur die Tiere lebten, translated by Terézia Mora, Berlin, Suhrkamp Verlag, 2014. ISBN 978-3-518-42424-7
- Esti iskola – Olvasókönyv felnőtteknek, Budapest/ Bratislava, 2007. ISBN 978-80-7149-921-3
  - Abendschule – Eine Fibel für Erwachsene, translated by Terézia Mora, Suhrkamp Verlag, Berlin, 2012. ISBN 978-3-518-42289-2
  - Escuela nocturna – Manual de lectura para adultos, translated by José Miguel González Trevejo, Ediciones Siruela, Madrid, 2015. ISBN 978-84-16396-11-5
  - Night School: A Reader for Grownups, translated by Jim Tucker. Open Letter Books, Rochester, 2019.

=== Children's literature ===
- Vagánybagoly és a negyedik Á avagy mindenki láthat mást (Tuffy Owl and Class Four A or Everyone Can See Differently), 2021.
- Vagánybagoly és a harmadik Á avagy mindenki lehet más (Tuffy Owl and Class Three A or Everyone Can be Different), 2019.

=== Non-fiction ===
- Der Sommer unsres Missvergnügens (essays on memory, history and visuality), Matthes & Seitz/DAAD, Berlin, 2019.
- Turul és dínó (The Turul Bird and the Dino – essays on the visual representation of historical memory), Magvető, Budapest, 2016.
- Exponált Emlék – Családi képek a magán- és közösségi emlékezetben, ed. Zsófia Bán and Hedvig Turai, AICA/Argumentum, Budapest, 2008. ISBN 9789630651950
  - Exposed Memory: Family Pictures in Private and Collective Memory, AICA-CEU Press, Budapest, 2010. ISBN 978-9639776708
- Próbacsomagolás (Test Packing, essays), Kalligram, Budapest/Bratislava, 2008. ISBN 978-80-8101-056-9
- Amerikáner: A huszadik századi amerikai irodalom és mûvészet kultikus darabjai (Cult Works in American Literature and Art, essays), Magvető, Budapest, 2000.
- Desire and De-Scription: Words and Images of Postmodernism in the Late Poetry of William Carlos Williams, Amsterdam, Rodopi, 1999. ISBN 978-9042004634

Zsófia Bán also regularly publishes critical pieces on literature and visual art, as well as op-eds in magazines and newspapers.

== Prizes ==
- 2021: Spycher: Literature Award Leuk
- 2020: Best Children's Book of the Year Prize (Children's Jury)
- 2018: Acquisition Award, LOOP Barcelona Video Festival (co-created with Péter Forgács)
- 2014: International Literature Award (Shortlist)
- 2013: Glass Marble Prize
- 2013: Aegon Prize (Shortlist)
- 2012: Tibor Déry Prize
- 2009: Palládium Prize
- 2009: Mozgó Világ Prize
- 2008: Aegon Prize (Shortlist)
- 2008: Attila József Prize
- 2007: Balassa Péter Prize
