= Mózes Csoma =

Hungarian Koreanist (born 1978)

- Csoma Mózes
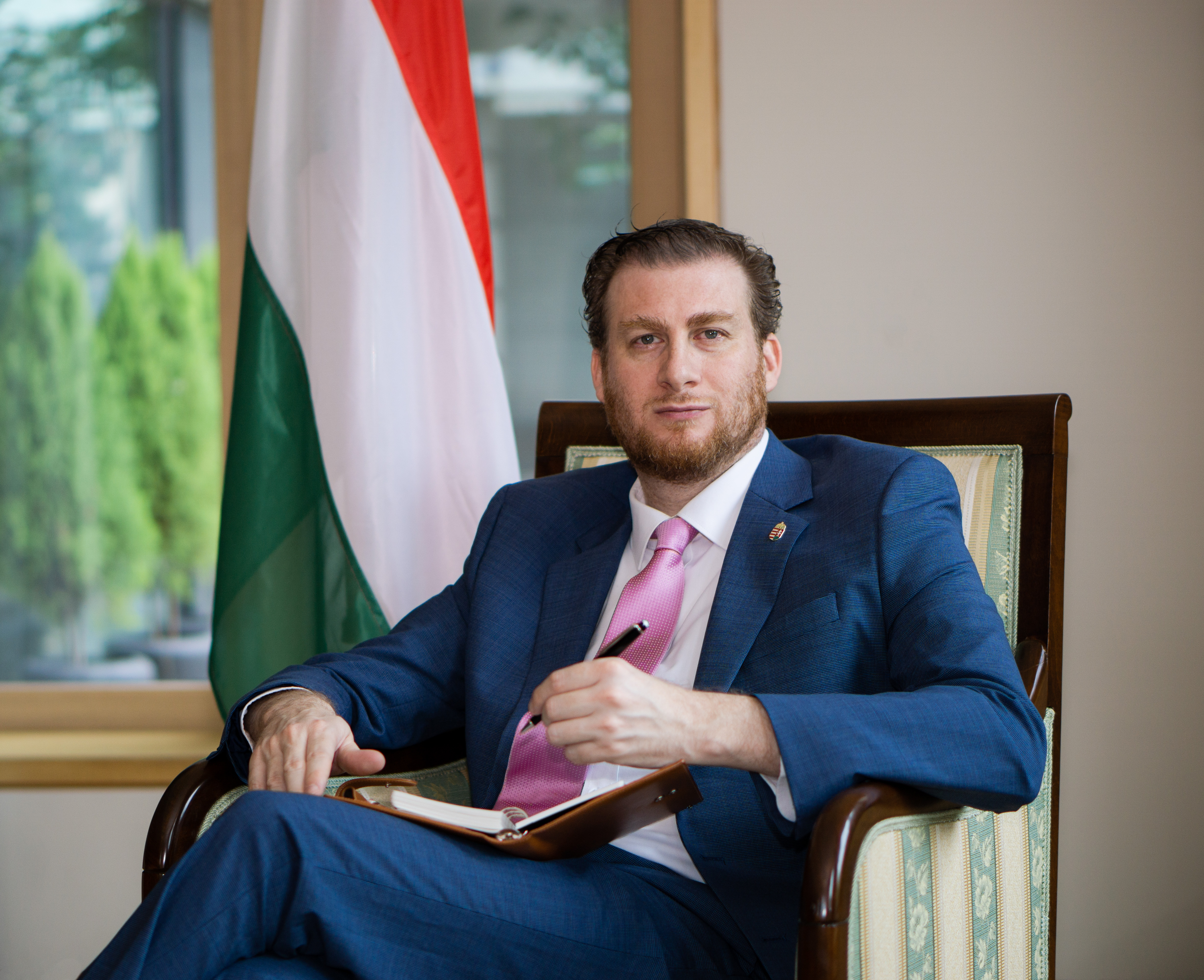
- Born: May 11, 1978 (age 48); Budapest
- Other name: 초머 모세 (Chomeo Mo-se)
- Citizenship: Hungarian
- Occupations: Koreanist scholar Ambassador of Hungary to the Republic of Korea and the Democratic People’s Republic of Korea

Academic background
- Education: Eötvös Loránd University; Budapest Business School; Yonsei University; Zrínyi Miklós University of National Defence

Academic work
- Institutions: Eötvös Loránd University Department of Korean Studies (2013–2017); National University of Public Service (2018–204); Károli Gáspár University of the Reformed Church Department of Korean Studies (2023–)

Mózes Csoma (Korean: 초머 모세; born May 11, 1978) is a Hungarian Koreanist. He researches current and historical events in Korea. He is an associate professor with a habitation degree and a senior research fellow.

From 2008, he was a professor at the Faculty of Humanities of the Eötvös Loránd University in Budapest, responsible for establishing and managing the first Korean Department in Hungary. From February 2018, he serves as a senior research fellow at the National University of Public Service in Budapest. Beginning with September 2018, he serves as the ambassador of Hungary to the Republic of Korea and the Democratic People’s Republic of Korea.

From 2023, he works as the head of the Department of Korean Studies at the Károli Gáspár University of the Reformed Church in Hungary.

== Education ==
Mózes Csoma studied at Móricz Zsigmond High School in Budapest. In 1996, he was one of the winners of the National Secondary School Academic Competition; therefore, he was granted the opportunity to start his studies at Eötvös Loránd University without taking an entrance exam. Between 1996 and 2002, he studied history and political studies, and attended Korean studies courses at the College for Foreign Trade (now Budapest Business School). In 2001, he won the second prize of the Országos Tudományos Diákköri Konferencia, national scholarly competition, for university students with his thesis written about the political circumstances on the Korean Peninsula. He studied Korean language at Yonsei University in Seoul, receiving the fellowship of the Korea Foundation in 2000 and 2004-2005. He received his Ph.D. in 2007 at Zrínyi Miklós National Defense University University in Budapest. His doctoral dissertation was written about the internal political affairs of the Korean Peninsula.

== Scholarly activity ==
From 2006, he started holding lectures at Corvinus University of Budapest. The title of his history lecture was ’Korea: One nation, two states’. From 2007, he worked at Eötvös Loránd University, and in 2008 he was nominated to the position of assistant professor. He was responsible for establishing and managing the country’s first ever Korean Department. He received his habilitation degree in 2010, and was nominated to the position of associate professor in 2013. He prepared and planned the Korean Studies BA program in 2008, and after receiving its accreditation, he devised the Koreanology MA program and received its accreditation in 2012. He also planned the Koreanology Ph.D. program in 2017. From February 2018, he serves as a senior research fellow in Budapest at the National University of Public Service.

The field of his research is Korean history, the differences between the South Korean and North Korean point of view on the common history, and the history of the Hungarian-Korean relations. He frequently gave lectures at international conferences, and published several books about his research.

In May 2023, he established the Department of Korean Studies at the Károli Gáspár University of the Reformed Church in Hungary, he prepared its Korean Studies BA program and received its accreditation. He works as the head of the Department of Korean Studies. In October 2024, he became the dean of the faculty of humanities.

== As ambassador of Hungary to South Korea ==
In the second year of his term, the first-ever direct flight between Budapest and Incheon was successfully launched, and the Hungarian Cultural Institute was established in Seoul, the location of which had been personally chosen by the Ambassador in Myeong-dong district. With regards to economic relations, in 2019 and 2021 most investments came to Hungary from the Republic of Korea. It was also during his term that the first-ever Korean-Hungarian Friendship Association was established. Its chairperson is Mr. Roh Jaeheon, son of President Roh Tae-woo, who had established the diplomatic relations with Hungary. President Moon Jae-in's official visit to Hungary in November 2021 was also a significant step forward in terms of political affairs, as the previous Korean presidential visit to Hungary happened in 2001, 20 years earlier. During his term in Korea, Csoma often gave interviews to the Korean media and published a twenty-part series of articles on the history of Hungarian-Korean relations in the columns of the Korea Joongang Daily.

== Published books ==
in Hungary

- Korea. Egy nemzet, két ország (Korea. One nation, two states; Budapest, 2008)
- Magyarok Koreában (Hungarians in Korea; Budapest, 2009)
- Koreai csaták és harcosok (Korean battles and warriors; Budapest, 2011)
- Koreaiak Magyarországon az 1950-es években (Koreans in Hungary in the 1950s; Budapest, 2012)
- Korea. Egy nemzet, két ország – a közös gyökerektől (Korea. One nation, two states – from the common roots; Budapest, 2013)
- 1989. Diszkózene a Kvangbok sugárúton – Észak-Korea a rendszerváltozások évében (1989. Disco music on the Kwangbok street. North Korea in the years of the Eastern European political changes; Budapest, 2014)
- Sövény Aladár, a hazai koreanisztika úttörője (Aladár Sövény, the pioneer scholar of the Hungarian Koreanology; Budapest, 2015)
- Magyarország és Korea 1956-ban. Az Uralban találkozunk! (Korea and Hungary in 1956. We will meet in the Ural Mountain!; Budapest, 2016)
- Korea története. A két koreai állam történelemszemléletének összehasonlításával (History of Korea. With the comparison of the South Korean and North Korean official points of view on history; Budapest, 2018)
- A History of Korea - Through a comparison of the two Koreas’ historical approaches (Budapest, 2019)
- Visit to the Land of Morning Calm. Dr. Dezső Bozóky’s Korean Photographs (Co-author: Tatjána Kardos) (2020)
- Phenjani exodus (2023)
- A phenjani legenda (2025)
- „Mádzsárü” – Egy magyar bombaszakértő a koreai függetlenségi harcosok között az 1920-as évek elején (2026)

in South Korea

- 한반도를 방문한 헝가리인들의 기억 비망록. (Memorandum – the Hungarians who visited the Korean Peninsula; Seoul, 2009)
- 헝가리 부다페스트로! 1956년 헝가리 혁명과 북한 유학생들. (To Hungary, Budapest! The Hungarian revolution in 1956 and the North Korean students; Seoul, 2013)
- 헝가리 최초의 한국학 학자 북한을 만나다. 쇠베니 얼러다르의 1950년대 북한 문화에 관한 기억. (The first Hungarian Koreanist scholar meets North Korea. Aladár Sövény’s observations about the North Korean culture in the 1950s; Seoul, 2015)
- From North Korea to Budapest. North Korean students in the Hungarian revolution in 1956. (Seoul and Edison, 2016)
- The relations of the Korean Peninsula and Hungary seen through rare photos (Seoul, 2019)
- From Budapest to the Korean War: Hungarian Physicians in North Korea, 1950–1957 (Seoul, 2021)
- 마자르. 한국 독립운동사의 전설, 헝가리인 폭탄 전문가 (Seoul, 2026)

== Membership ==
- Association of Korean Studies in Europe
- Society of Korean Language and Literature (Seoul)
- Editorial board of ’The Korean History Education Review’ (역사교육)
- The Association for Korean Modern and Contemporary History (Seoul)
- Royal Asiatic Society Korea Branch (Seoul)

== Awards ==
- Awarded by the South Korean minister of culture for promoting the Korean culture in Hungary (2016)
- Awarded by the South Korean Dankook University for developing the international scholarly cooperation (2016)
- Honorary Citizen of Seoul (2022)
- Gwanghwa Medal by the Republic of Korea (2023)
- Faculty Council of the Faculty of Humanities and Social Sciences of the Károli Gáspár Reformed University, Award for Publication of the Year for the monograph Phenjani exodus (2024)
