= András Kenessei =

Hungarian art historian, writer, and journalist

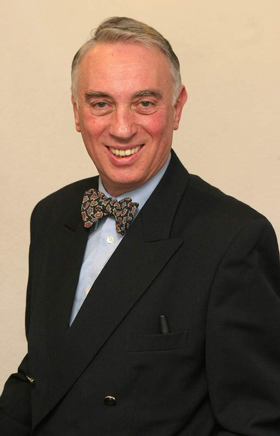
- Born: 12 January 1942 (age 84); Budapest

András Kenessei (born 12 January 1942) is a Hungarian art historian, writer and journalist. Kenessei's articles, papers on art, and reviews have been published in journals as well as culture columns in daily papers and weekly magazines since 1964. Since 1966, he has also written literary pieces, which have appeared in literary journals such as Kortárs and Új Írás.

== Early life and education ==
András Kenessei was born in Budapest in 1942, and graduated from Kölcsey Ferenc Secondary School [Kölcsey Ferenc Gimnázium] in 1960. Initially not admitted to the university, two years later he was admitted to Eötvös Loránd University [ELTE], where he studied Hungarian language and literature as well as art history at the Faculty of Arts, completing his studies in 1967.

Kenessei's articles, papers on art, and reviews have been published in journals as well as culture columns in daily papers and weekly magazines (i.e., Budapester Rundschau, Élet és Irodalom, Művészet, Népszabadság, Ország-Világ, Rakéta Regényújság, Tükör, Új Tükör) since 1964. Since 1966, he has also written literary pieces, which have regularly appeared in literary journals, such as Kortárs and Új Írás.

== Early journalism career ==
Having graduated from university, Kenessei made a living as a freelance writer for several years. During that time, he interned as an editor at the publishing house Magvető Könyvkiadó and worked as a journalist for various weeklies. He later worked for the Hungarian Record Company [Magyar Hanglemezgyártó Vállalat], compiling prose recordings and jazz albums released by the record company.

Between the summer of 1977 and May 1992, Kenessei worked for the daily newspaper Magyar Hírlap as a member of the editorial team responsible for culture and foreign affairs. Starting out as a correspondent, he was later appointed to be deputy column editor and, subsequently, senior newspaper contributor. He was commissioned by the ballet director and choreographer of the Hungarian State Opera House, László Seregi, to write papers to be published in the program booklet for all three of his Shakespeare ballet productions.

The pieces written by Kenessei for Magyar Hírlap range from articles, accounts, interviews, reports, and feature pieces, to reviews on films, theatre productions, radio and television shows, concerts, books, and recordings.

== Radio and later work ==
Starting in the early 1980s, Kenessei worked as a contributor on several cultural radio shows broadcast on Magyar Rádió, most notably the weekly cultural review show Láttuk, Halottuk [Seen and Heard], hosted by András Kepes. From 1986, he made numerous television news pieces as a correspondent for TV-híradó [TV News], interviewing prominent figures in the world of culture and art for the daily news program produced by Endre Aczél for Magyar Televízió.

Kenessei wrote a radio play, entitled Terézvárosi hazugság [The Lie in Terézváros District], which aired on Magyar Rádió in 1979. The television adaptation of his family saga Százezer ős [Hundreds of Thousands of Ancestors], directed by Erika Szántó, was broadcast on Magyar Televízió in 1991.

In 1989, Kenessei took up art dealing and also focused his work on it, writing numerous articles, essays, accounts, and reviews about art and art dealing for daily newspapers, such as Magyar Hírlap, Népszabadság, the business daily Világgazdaság (Zöld Újság), and various weekly magazines. The Hungarian National Federation of Retailers [Kiskereskedők Országos Szervezete – KISOSZ] invited him to hold specialized lectures on art dealing as part of the federation's first training course on art dealing, also commissioning him to write the textbook used in the course.

In 1991, Kenessei founded the art-dealing journal Műtárgy – Régiség [Artefacts – Antiquities], working as its publisher and editor until 2009, when it ceased publication. The founding of the journal coincided with the one-day conference held by Sotheby's in Budapest, which Kenessei organized at Fészek Művészklub, a renowned club for artists, in cooperation with the head of the company's Budapest office, Soraya Gräfin von Stubenberg. The conference saw six of Sotheby's department heads give presentations to Hungarian art dealers.

From 1998, Kenessei produced and hosted a television show dedicated to art dealing, entitled Licit [The Bid]. Concurrently, from 2000, he was in charge of the regular art-dealing segment of the radio show Chaplin kalapja [Chaplin's Hat], produced by János Simkó, and he also worked on the weekly show Tőzsdevilág (Stock Market World).

Since 2000, Kenessei has been living in both Vienna and Budapest, organizing and managing exhibitions of the works of contemporary Hungarian painters. Between 2005 and 2007, he was a senior correspondent for Gazdasági Rádio, a business radio station, which aired his daily reports on the stock exchange as well as 60-minute interviews each week. He has authored approximately 1,500 articles, papers, essays, portrait pieces on artists, and interviews.

== Books ==
- Esős szeptember [Rainy September] (crime story) (Albatrosz, Magvető Könyvkiadó, Budapest, 1969) – Published under the pen name Albert Harald
- Történetek és kitalálások [Stories and Confabulations] (short stories) (Szépirodalmi Könyvkiadó, Budapest, 1972)
- Szeretők ideje [A Time for Lovers] (novel) (Móra Kozmosz Könyvkiadó, Budapest, 1979)
- A nyomozást abbahagyni! [Close the investigation!] (historical documentary novel) (Helikon, Budapest, 1981)
- Szakíts, ha bírsz [Break up if you can!] (novel) (Móra Kozmosz Könyvkiadó, Budapest, 1986)
- Lengőlábú Olivér [Oliver and his Swinging Legs] (children's tale) (Officina Nova, Budapest, 1988)
- Százezer ős [Hundreds of Thousands of Ancestors] (family saga) (Szépirodalmi Könyvkiadó, Budapest, 1989)
- Az átkozott lehetőség [The Damned Opportunity] (sci-fi novel) (Móra, Galaktika Könyvek, Budapest, 1989) – Published under the pen name Hank Jeff
- Művészettörténet dióhéjban [Art History in a Nutshell] (textbook) (KISOSZ, Budapest, 1990)
- Őszinte részvényem, avagy Hogyan tőzsdézzünk? [My Deepest Shares – How to Play the Stock Market] (essay) (PuttoPress, Budapest, 2004)

== Other works ==
- Ötvenezer arany [Fifty Thousand Gold Coins] (play, published in the supplement of the theatrical magazine Színház, December 1986)
- Terézvárosi hazugság [The Lie in Terézváros District] (radio play, broadcast on Hungarian National Radio, 1987)
- Százezer ős [Hundreds of Thousands of Ancestors] (television film, broadcast on Hungarian National Television, Channel 1, 1991)
- Raondaoh (sci-fi story published in the sci-fi magazine Galaktika, Volume XXVIII, December 2007)
- Sötétben [In the Dark] (sci-fi story published in the sci-fi magazine Galaktika, Volume XXXVI, May 2015)

== General references ==
- Kortárs magyar írók kislexikona 1959–1988 [Concise Encyclopedia of Contemporary Hungarian Writers 1959–1988]. Ed. Fazakas, István. (Magvető, Budapest, 1989)
- Kortárs Magyar Művészeti Lexikon [Encyclopedia of Contemporary Hungarian Art]. Ed. Fitz, Péter. (Enciklopédia Kiadó, Budapest, 1999–2001)
- Új magyar irodalmi lexikon [New Hungarian Literary Encyclopedia]. Ed. Péter, László. (Akadémiai Kiadó, Budapest, 1994)
- Artportal
- Magyar és nemzetközi ki kicsoda 1998 [Hungarian and International Who's Who 1998] (Biográf, Budapest, 1997)
- Magyar Televízió Archívuma [Archives of the Hungarian National Television]
- Magyar Rádió Archívuma – Hangtár [Archives of the Hungarian National Radio – Sound Archives]
- MEK OSZK [Hungarian Electronic Library, National Széchenyi Library]
