= Károly Marót =

Hungarian classical scholar (1885–1963)

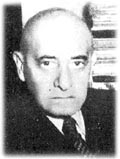
Károly Marót

Károly Marót (Arad, 2 March 1885 - Budapest, 27 October 1963), was a Hungarian classical scholar, philologist and member of the Hungarian Academy of Sciences.

Marót specialised in the study of ancient epic, particularly the works of Homer, and interpreted the works using the latest ideas in psychiatry about the subconscious.

== Selected publications ==
- Der Eid als Tat. Szegred, Szeged Városi Nyomda és Könyvkiadó, 1924.
- A Görög irodalom kezdetei. Budapest, Akadémiai Kiadó, 1956.
- Die Anfänge der Griechischen Litteratur vorfragen. 1960.
