= Géza Fodor (philosopher) =

Hungarian Philosopher (born 1943)

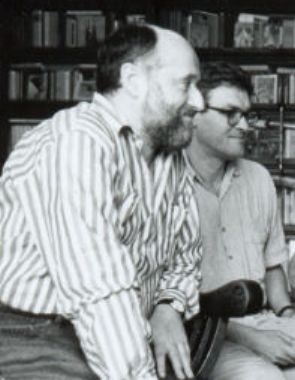
Fodor Géza dramaturg.

Géza Fodor (2 May 1943 – 7 October 2008) was a Hungarian art and literary critic, philosopher, and dramaturge. He was one of the founding members of the Katona József Theater in Budapest. He worked at the Institute of Philosophy of the Hungarian Academy of Sciences between 1967 and 1973 and at the Faculty of Humanities of the Eötvös Loránd University thereafter.

Fodor published his work in the area of aesthetics and philosophy of musical and drama theory as a collection of essays in 1999, in German.

== Selected works ==
- Géza Fodor: Das hoffnungsloze Meisterwerk: Essays zus Musikphilosophie, Traude Junghans Verlag, Cuxhaven-Dartford, 1999.
