= József de Révay =

Hungarian philosopher, professor, and ice hockey player

- Born: 20 October 1902; Tajná, Austria-Hungary (now in Slovakia)
- Died: 19 April 1945 (aged 42); Gyömrő, Hungary
- Position: Centre
- Played for: Budapesti Korcsolyázó Egylet
- National team: Hungary
- Playing career: 1926–1933

Jozsef Maria Julius Simon de Revay, Count Sklabina and Blatnicka, (20 October 1902 – 19 April 1945) was a Hungarian philosopher, professor, and ice hockey player. He played for the Hungarian national team at the 1928 and 1936 Winter Olympics and at the World Championships. He later taught at Pázmány Péter Catholic University.

== World War II ==
Following the forming of Communist government in Hungary towards end of World War II, he was arrested by police, interrogated and eventually killed.
