= István Hahn =

Hungarian classical scholar and historian (1913–1984)

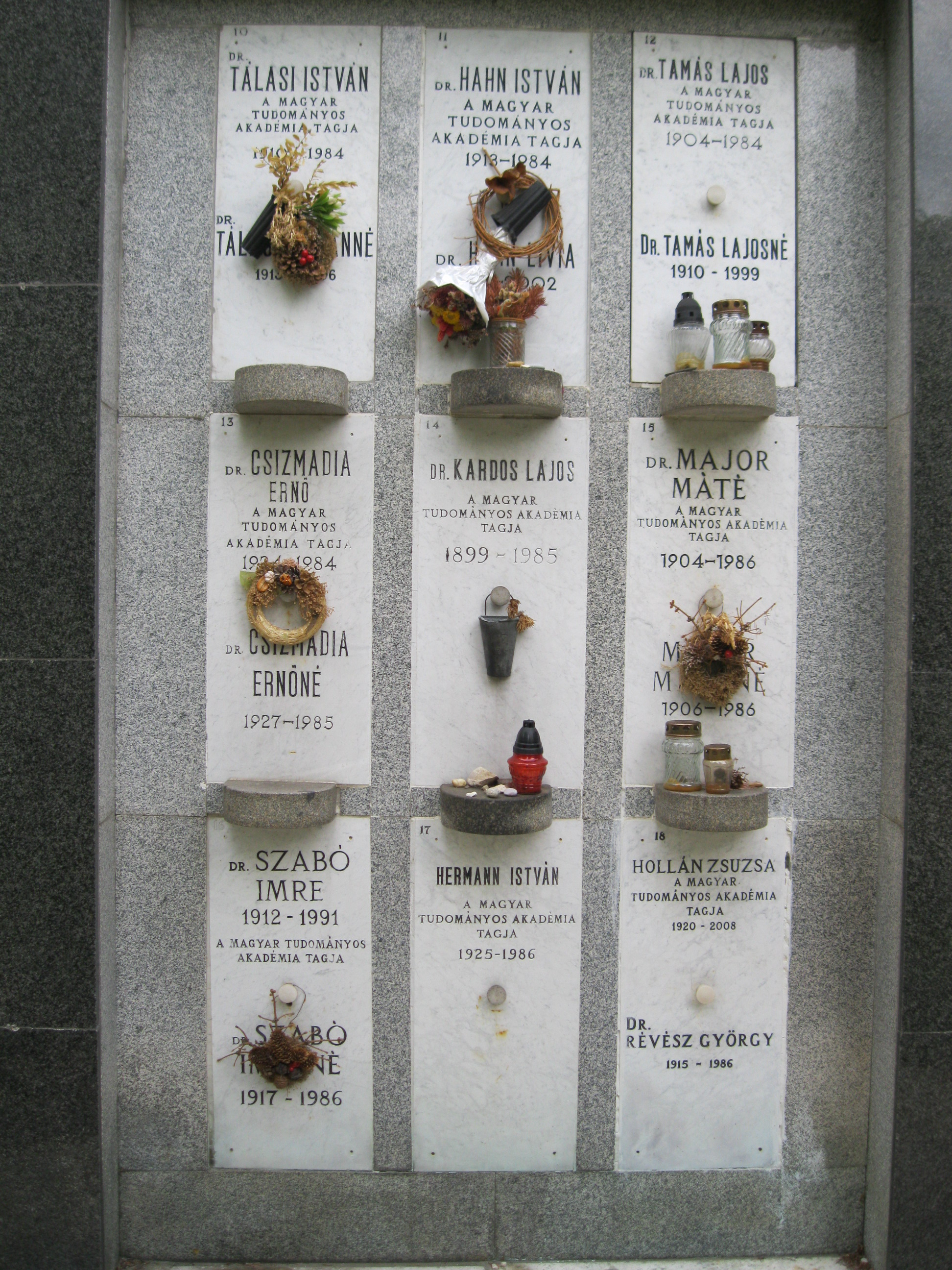
Urn house in Farkasréti Cemetery with the name of Hahn (first row, in the middle)

István Hahn (Budapest, 28 March 1913 - Budapest, 26 July 1984), was a Hungarian historian and a member of the Hungarian Academy of Sciences.

He wrote important papers on the movements of the poor free in the towns of late antiquity, dependency relations in antiquity, and forms of proprietorship in archaic Greece.

== Selected publications ==
- Traumdeutung und gesellschaftliche Wirklichkeit: Artemidorus Daldianus als sozialgeschichtliche Quelle. Konstanz, Univ.-Verl., 1992. ISBN 9783879403950
