= Maria Sarungi Tsehai =

Tanzanian activist

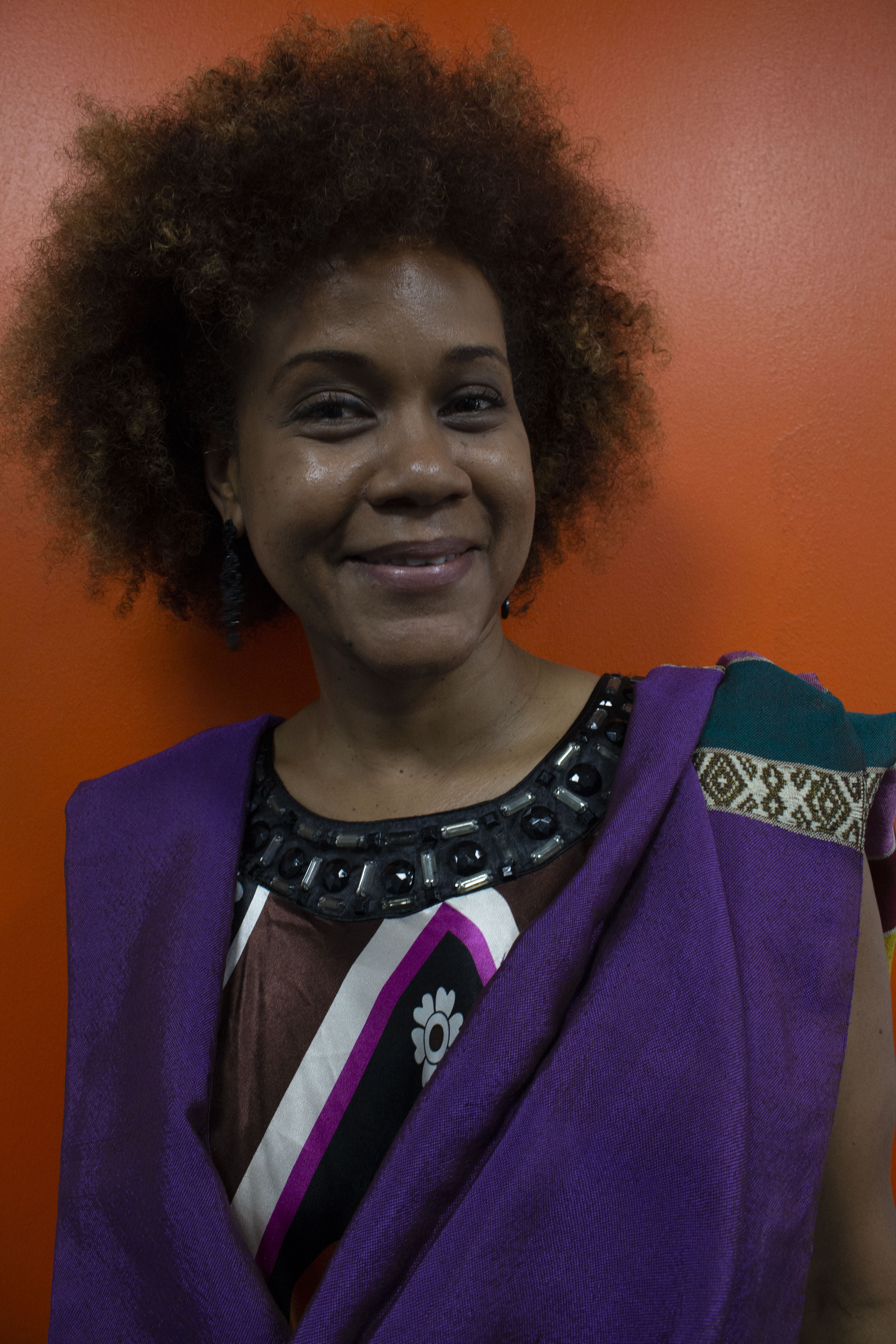
- Education: Eötvös Loránd University
- Occupation: Entrepreneur
- Website: mariasarungitsehai.wordpress.com

Maria Sarungi Tsehai is a Tanzanian activist known for her online campaign "Change Tanzania". Change Tanzania began as a hashtag on Twitter (#changeTanzania) to influence Tanzanian citizens to participate in bringing positive change in different aspects of life, especially in political matters in Tanzania. She is also known for helping young women to attain their goals in the fashion industry as she is a director of miss universe Tanzania.

== Education and career ==
Tsehai received her degree in Humanities in 1999 from the University of Eötvös Loránd, Hungary. She is versed in communication, journalism, and the fashion industry. She also owns her own communication company, Compass Communication. She has participated in the making of films such as Am Tired (2005) and Born on Fire (2008). She currently owns her own online television channel called Kwanza TV.

== Activism ==
Tsehai is known for her advocacy for change in Tanzania. Through the use of media, she promotes education to young women, and against discrimination toward women.

Maria Sarungi Tsehai has been reported abducted in Kenya on 12 January 2025. Maria was reportedly taken by three armed men in a black Noah vehicle from Chaka Place in Nairobi's Kilimani area at approximately 3:15 pm on 12 January 2025.
