= Endre Fülei-Szántó =

Hungarian linguist

- Born: September 28, 1924; Budapest, Hungary
- Died: 16 January 1995 (aged 70); Pécs
- Spouse(s): Olga Frigyesy (h. 1963–1982); Mária Dornbach (h. 1984–1995)
- Awards: 1992. Honorary Cross of the Order of Merit of the Republic of Hungary; 1995. János Csere Apáczai Prize; 2005 Hungarian Heritage Award

Academic background
- Education: Eötvös Loránd University
- Influences: György Balanyi, Sándor Sík, Antal Schütz

Academic work
- Discipline: Linguistics
- Institutions: Corvinus University of Budapest, University of Pécs

Endre Fülei-Szántó (September 28, 1924 – January 16, 1995) was a Hungarian linguist, author and professor.

== Biography ==
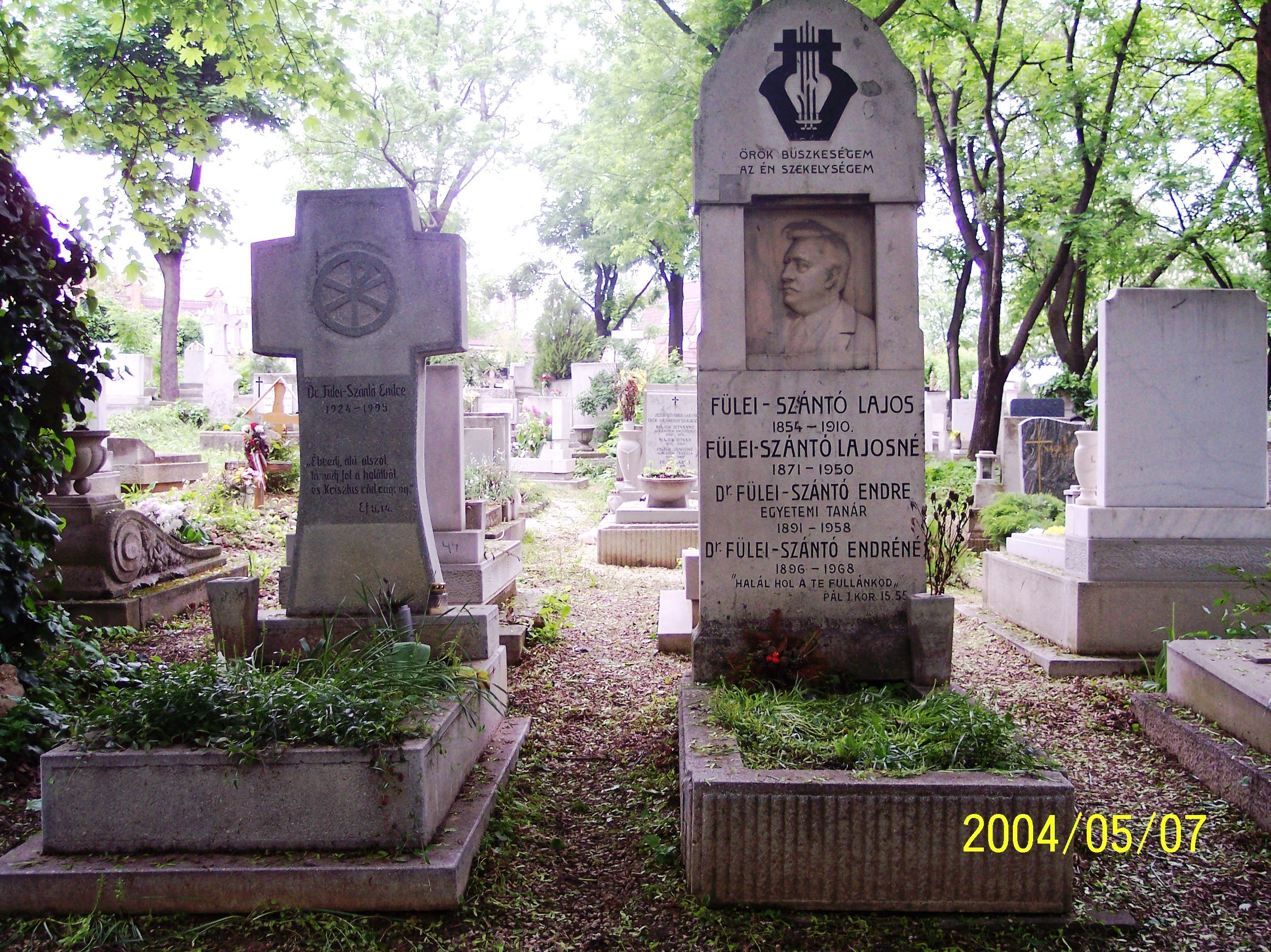
right The grave of Endre Fülei-Szántó and his parents and grandparents in the Farkasréti Cemetery

His father Endre Fülei-Szántó senior (1890–1958) was a lawyer, university professor and writer from Transylvania.

His grandfather was Lajos Fülei Szántó, a writer, poet, publicist. His great-grandfather was furrier, studied in Germany, then returned home to Székelyudvarhely (Odorheiu Secuiesc). His mother was a literary translator. Her parents were deported in 1951 and her father was imprisoned.

Fülei-Szántó's children were born to his first wife Frigyesy Olga. András (1964-) and Éva (1968-) Grandchildren. In 1944, he became a law student and in 1948, he received a doctorate in law and political science from Pázmány Péter University. Endre Fülei-Szántó studied at the Piarist Gymnasium in Budapest. He graduated in philosophy and psychology and he received a degree in French as a linguist he studied economics for two semesters. From 1944 to 1945, he was a member of the resistance, doing increasingly desperate political work within the youth group of the Smallholders' Party. In 1948, he was arrested and transferred to the Hadik barracks (Budapest, Bartók Béla út 24–26). From 1945, the building became the headquarters of the Ministry of Defense, Military Policy Department (Katpol), which was under communist influence, and in the basement of the building cellar prisons were built. György Kardos was interrogated. He offered him either to apply for admission to the secret service and become an external collaborator, or, as he spent too much time at the French Institute, to be arrested as a spy. György Kardos encouraged him with the words: "I don't have much interest in you, but it's not impossible that you will be a useful external collaborator". Endre Fülei-Szántó signed the application to become an external collaborator and was released. He tried to escape to the West, but was caught. The Military High Court sentenced him to life imprisonment in the first instance and to ten years in the second instance.

Between 1948 and 1956, he served eight years in Váci prison. In March 1951, a new prisoner arrived at the prison, who was György Kardos and they got to know each other, and were prison mates for five years. He was put in the same cell with many others, from the defendants in the Rajk trial to veterans of the Spanish Civil War, which was how he learned Spanish. His Spanish teachers in prison were Pál Ignotus, József Hatvany, László Mátyás and Béla Szász. The many sufferings of prison could not change the basic traits of his personality: the young man with a sparkling mind, a great sense of humour, courage, who saw the goodness in everyone, wrote plays for the prison theatre, debated, thought and made friends with many of his fellow prisoners of the most diverse political parties.

After his release, Fülei-Szántó worked as an auxiliary worker for 6 years. In 1962, he was admitted to the Karl Marx University of Economics to teach language. He taught German, Spanish, French and English at the Language Institute of the Budapest University of Economics and Business. In 1965, he obtained a diploma as a secondary school teacher of Spanish and in 1983, a diploma as a secondary school teacher of English at Eötvös Loránd University. In 1971, he received the degree candidate of science. For a decade from 1966, he was the director of the Debrecen Summer University, where he directed the study of Hungarian for foreigners. The product of these experiences was his five-volume book: Hungarian Language for Foreigners (Volumes I-V, TIT, Budapest, 1972). The Hungarian Language and Culture, 1972, "Hungarian for Foreigners", 1972-V. He and his colleagues taught Hungarian to Finns, Russians, Koreans, Venezuelans, English, Germans and people from twenty other countries from all over the world.

Since 1982, he has been a professor at the Department of Hungarian Language at the Janus Pannonius University. Between 1986 and 1990, he spent four years as a visiting professor at the University of Bucharest. There, he spent the last years of the Ceausescu era, when Romanian relations with Hungary were undergoing a systematic conflict; he lived through the fall of the dictatorship and the Romanian Revolution. He taught at the Department of Oriental Languages, Faculty of Philology, University of Bucharest, as a visiting lecturer under an interstate agreement. He was the author of Fortress in Captivity, a book about Ceausescu. Between 1990 and 1992 he organised the Spanish Department and the Spanish Faculty in Pécs. He created the Inter-Faculty Cooperation Circle, an academic forum of the four faculties of the university.

From 1971 to 1976, Fülei-Szántó was the Hungarian representative of the FIPLV (International Federation of Language Teacher Associations) and a member of the international associations IDV (German), IATEFL (English) and AEPE (Spanish). He has organised and hosted numerous international and national conferences and courses, both as a lecturer and as a teacher. In 1991, he became co-president of the PEK (Political Convicts' Association: 1945–56) and since 1992, he has been a member of its executive committee. He was a member of the executive committee of the World Federation of Hungarians. In 1992, he was elected Honorary President of the Spanish-Hungarian Friendship Society of Pécs. In 1993, he was elected President of HONT (International Association of Hungarian Studies Teachers).

In 1992, he was awarded the Order of Merit of the Republic of Hungary.

== Notable works ==
- Theory of Teaching Material and Modern Teaching Materials In: Modern Linguistics and Language Teaching (International Conference Bp., 1–5 April 1971): 77–87, Akadémiai Kiadó, Bp. 1975.
- „Impositive sentences in Spanish. Theory and description in linguistic pragmatics". Henk Haverkate, Amsterdam: North-Holland Publishing Company, 1979.
- Speculative grammars of the Middle Ages. The doctrine of Partes orationis of the Modistae by Bursill-Hall, G. L. Publication date 1972. Fülei-Szántó Endre. 246–255.
- ”Congressus internationalis Fenno-Ugristarum "Congressus internationalis Fenno-Ugristarum" Tractationes participantium Hungarorum sectiorum linguisticarum Congressus VI. internationalis Fenno-Ugristarum "Tractationes participantium Hungarorum sectiorum linguisticarum Congressus VI. internationalis Fenno-Ugristarum" Budapest. Akadémiai Kiadó., 1984.
- Just, Economica, Linguistica In: Sprache und Information (Wirtschaft) Attikon Verlag (Hrg.: Theo Bungarten) Hamburg, 1988.
- Fortress in captivity: the psychological adventures of a visiting teacher in the Balkans. Pécs Baranya M. Kvt., (Pécs Molnár) 1993). (in Hungarian
- Model S - O (strukture–operacije) In: Aktivne metode i moderna pomogala u nastavi dstranih jezika (511–518.) Zagreb 1971.
- Ein Versuch der logischen und grammatischen Beschreibung der Modalitaten in einigen Sprachen In: Papers from the International Symposium on Applied Contrasive Linguistics (141–157.) Stuttgart 1971.
- Modern Linguistics and up-tu-date Teaching Materials (Társszerző Hegedűs József) In: FIPLV–TIT Kongresszus, 1971. április 3.)
- Der Zusammengesetzte Satz im Lehrmaterial In: Iral-Sonderband (207–214.) Heidelberg 1972.
- La gramática generativa y la enseńanza del espańol In: Boletin de AEPE No. 8. Madrid 1973.
- Generative Grammar and Teaching Materials In: Comenius Emlékkönyv Bratislava 1973.
- Oraciones nucleares en alemán, inglés, espańol y húngaro YELMO – Rev. del profesor de espańol 1973. No. 14. Madrid 1973. In: Actas del internacional de Estudios Hispánicos (277–283.) Bp. 1976.
- Grundstrukturen der kommunikativen Situationen In: Kommunikative und funktionale Sprachbetrachtung (162–168.) Halle, 1978.
- Interjektionen als kommunikative Einheiten In: Kommunikative–funktionale Sprachbetrachtung, Band 1. (87–91.) Halle 1981.
- Die Spieltheorie und ihre Besichtigung bei der Stoffauswahl für die sprachliche Ausbildung ausländisher Geraminstikstudenten In: Sammelband Herder Institut (35–40.) Leipzig, 1982.
- Soma Modal Values in Hungarian In: Nyelvtudományi Közlemények 87. 1984. 2. (331–336.) Bp. 1984.
- Plurilingua – Gegenwärtige Tendenzen der Kontaktlinguistik, Dümmler, Bonn 1983. – Könyvismertetés In: Germanistische Mitteilungen, Brüssel 19. 1984 (93–95.)
- On Modal Auxiliaries In: Nyelvtudományi Közlemények 1986. 2. (332–337.) Bp. 1986.
- Typological Aspects of Auxiliary Verbs In: Proceedings of the 14 International Congress of Linguistics (2361–2363.) Berlin 1987.
- Just, Economica, Linguistica In: Sprache und Information (= Wirtschaft) (295–306.) Attikon Verlag (Hrg.: Theo Bungarten) Hamburg 1988.
- Un unavoidable "seme" (meaning-element) in Componential Analysis In: Revue de Linguistique Roumaine C.I.T.A. XXVI. 1. (33–43.) Bukarest 1988.
- There Ranks of Action-guiding Rules in Natural Languages In: Revue de Linguistique Roumaine 1988. Tom. XXXIII. N.5. (Sept.–oct.) Bukarest 1988.
- Trans-, anti- und meta- (Philosophische Prefixe der Bedeutungsschaffung in der Dichtung von Paul Celan) In: Neue Literatur, Zeitschrift des Schriftstellerverbandes der Republik Rumänien, 1988. Nr. 6. (56–58.) Bukarest 1988.
- A verbális érintés. MTA Nyelvtudományi Intézete. Linguistica, Series C. Relationes 7. 1994. AKJournals DOI

== Notes ==
References'

- Máté Jakab. Fülei-Szántó Endre. (1924–1995) Magyar Nyelv. 1995/ 2. szám. (in Hungarian)
- Books by Endre Fülei-Szántó. National Document Supply System. MOKKA-ODR catalogue. (in Hungarian)
- . List of the notable dead of the Farkasréti Cemetery. Endre Fülei-Szántó. (in Hungarian)
- Gábor Szirtes. The Hungarian Heritage Award winner Endre Fülei-Szántó.Pécsi Szemle. (8. évfolyam) 2005./2. szám. (in Hungarian)
- "The National Memorial and Commemorative Committee has decided, by its decision No. 73/2020, to declare the resting place of Endre Fülei-Szántó, professor of linguistics, as part of the national cemetery (Budapest, Farkasréti cemetery)."(in Hungarian)
- Economist. Journal of MKKE. 1978. 7. Head of the "teenager department". Katalin Nagy, in conversation with Endre Fülei-Szántó, the new head of the Western Language Department of the Language Institute. (in Hungarian)
- "Fülei-Szántó Endre életrajza". fuleiszantoendre.freewb.hu. Website in memory of Endre Fülei-Szántó. By Zoltán Kiss of the South Transdanubian Regional Library and Knowledge Centre. (in Hungarian)
- Endre Fülei-Szántó (1924–1995) New lexicon of Révai. Editor-in-Chief: colleague István Tarsoly. Szekszárd. Babits Publishing House, 1996–2008. (in Hungarian)
- Fülei-Szántó Endre (1924–1995) New Hungarian biographical lexicon. Editor-in-Chief: László Markó. Budapest. M. Kvklub, 2001–2007. (in Hungarian)
- Fülei-Szántó Endre (1924–1995) Contemporary Hungarian writers. 1945–1997. bibliography and photo gallery. Edited by Éva F. Almási. Budapest. Enciklopédia, 1998–2000.
- Festschrift für Professor Endre Fülei-Szántó zum 70. Geburtstag / Hrsg. Nelu Bradean-Ebinger. Sorozat: (Multi lingua, 0238–2350) Budapest. Universität für Wirtschaftswissenschaften Budapest Zentrum für Sprachforschung, 1994.
- Fülei-Szántó Endre. WorldCat Identities.
- "Search Results". opac.oszk.hu. OSZK. 112. Publications of Endre Szántó Fülei.
- "Fülei Szántó Endre | Magyar életrajzi lexikon | Kézikönyvtár". arcanum.com. Fülei-Szántó Endre. ARCANUM. Biographical Encyclopaedia. (in Hungarian)
- Magyar Nyelvőr – 119. évfolyam – 1995.1. sz. A Nyelvőr hírei. 100–103. Kontra Miklós, Péntek János: Fülei Szántó Endre (1924–1995) (In Hungarian)
- There are 11 international references to Endre Fülei-Szántó's publications in the JSTOR database
- Modern language teaching. 1963–1989. First era. A brochure for adult education, published by the Centre for Foreign Language Education, TIT. Compiled by Zoltán Sturcz. Endre Fülei-Szántó has provided data for 41 publications.
- Published by De Gruyter Mouton on 1975. Cite this: Endre Fülei-Szántó. Modern Linguistics and Language Teaching. THEORY OF TEACHING MATERIAL AND MODERN TEACHING MATERIALS.
- Jankovits László. Fülei-Szántó Endre (1924–1995) Beszélő. 1995. 7. évfolyam, 5. szám. (in Hungarian)
- Fülei-Szántó Endre (1924–1995) Necrology. (in Hungarian) Új Dunántúli Napló, 1995. január (6. évfolyam) 1995-01-2-24.
- Sources for his biography: Festschrift für Professor Endre Fülei-Szántó zum 70. Geburtstag. Budapest. Univ. für Wirtschaftswissenschaften Budapest, 1994. The 70-year-old Endre Fülei-Szántó (in German) Links from: DATOS BNE ES. Catálogo BNE National Gravesites. Biography of Endre Fülei-Szántó Jr. Biography of Endre Fülei-Szántó Fülei Szántó Endre. ARCANUM. Biographical Encyclopaedia. (in Hungarian).
