= Ákos Pauler =

Hungarian philosopher (1876–1933)

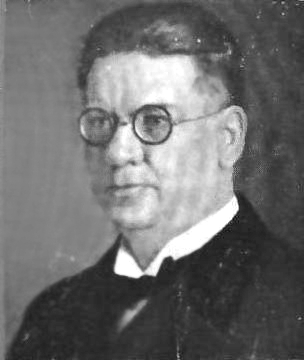
Ákos Pauler

Ákos Pauler (9 April 1876 – 29 June 1933) was a Hungarian philosopher, member of the Hungarian Academy of Sciences.

He defended metaphysics against logical positivism. As part of this defense, he accounted for a method of determining truths alongside the deductive and inductive methods, one which he called reductive. According to Pauler, the reductive method, unlike induction and deduction, does not determine what entities there are but rather can determine the conditions of possibility of valid thought itself. He also associates the reductive method with Plato's dialectic, even suggesting that reduction can ultimately lead to knowledge of the Form of the Good.
