= Viktor Kubiszyn =

Hungarian writer (born 1979)

Viktor Kubiszyn (born 1979) is a Hungarian writer. He studied film theory, film history, Hungarian linguistics and literature, as well as aesthetics, at the Faculty of Humanities of Eötvös Loránd University, Budapest between 1998 and 2006.

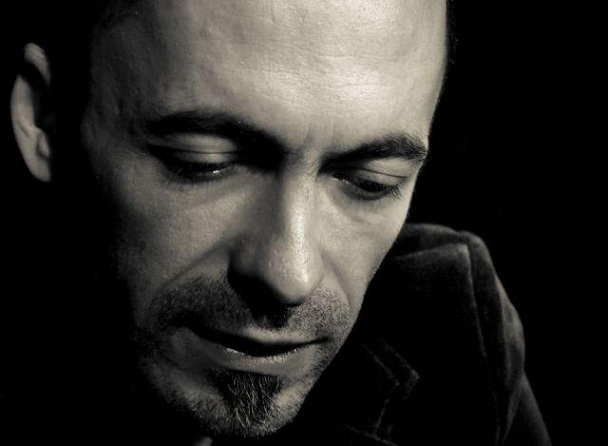
Portrait by János Hegedűs

His articles, film reviews, reports, interviews and essays have been published since 2002 in prominent Hungarian journals and Internet sites (Beszélő, Litera, Filmvilág, Film.hu, etc.), and collected into his first book, published in 2011 as Filmflesskönyv (Film-trip-book). His first, autobiographical novel, Drognapló (Drug Diary), a documentary novel, was also published in 2011, achieving instant success.

== Biography ==
Kubiszyn was born in Miskolc on 16 Nov. 1979, and has lived since 1986 in Budapest. He graduated in 1998 from the Berzsenyi Dániel Gimnázium (Berzsenyi High School). From 1998 to 2006 he was a student at the Eötvös Loránd University Faculty of Humanities (ELTE BTK) .

He spent one part of his past junkie life in the 8th district of Budapest, Józsefváros, near the historic )Inner City district which he often calls "the Zone". This part of the city is the poorest area of Budapest with a bad reputation. The area is a traditional craftsmen neighborhood, which became a slum in the previous decades.

== Filmflesskönyv ==
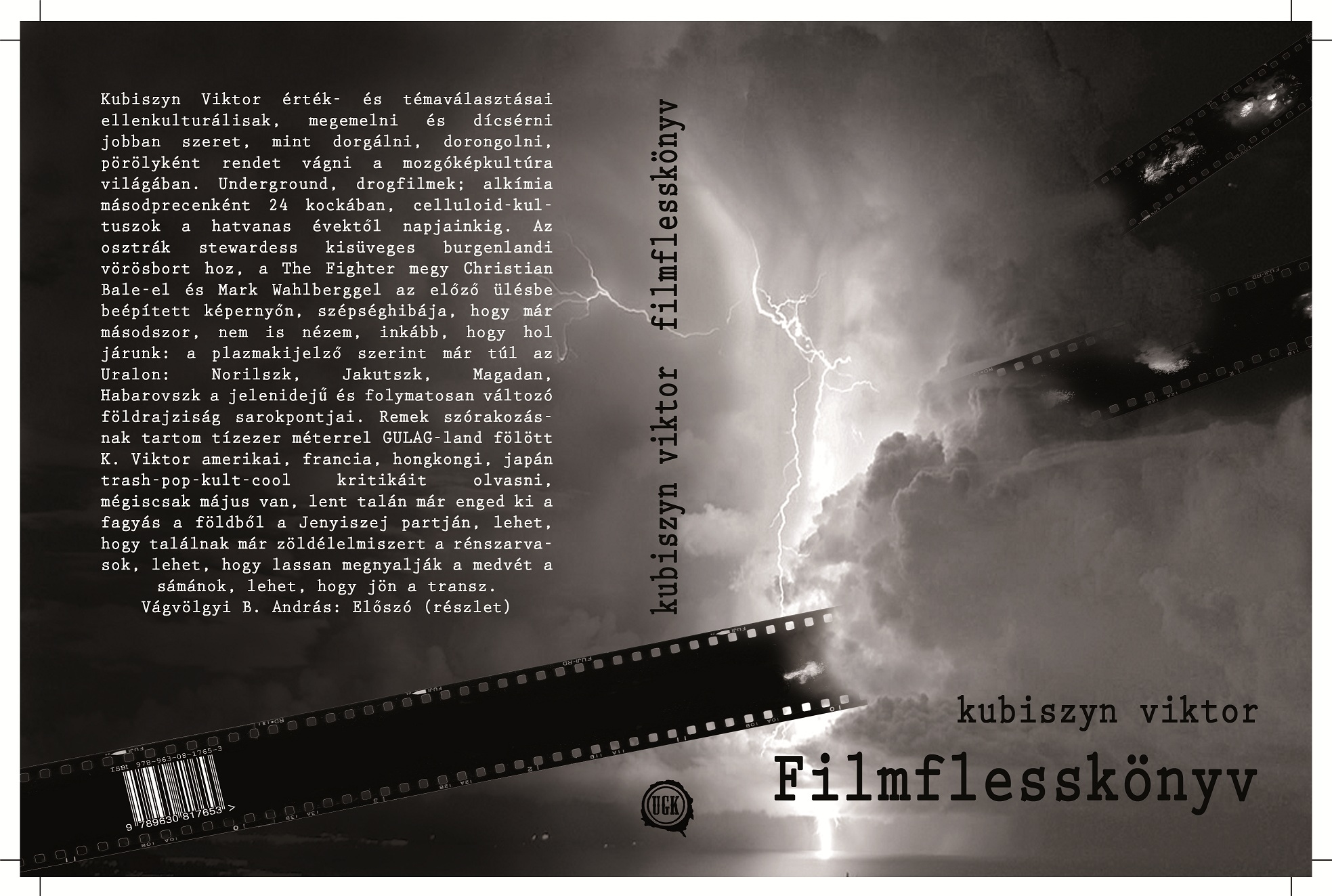
Filmflesskönyv

His first book was published by Underground Kiadó in 2011 as Filmflesskönyv (Film-trip-book), a collection of articles and essays. It contains his film criticisms which were published mostly in the "Filmhu" movie page and "Filmvilág" between 2003 and 2006. He has also published in “Pergő Képek”, "Beszélő", "Mozinet Magazin" and “Árgus”.

The following is an extract from the preface to the book written by András Vágvölgyi B.: "Viktor Kubiszyn is not a production-line worker of daily film criticism; Viktor Kubiszyn is an author with directions. His choices of values and topics are counter-cultural; he prefers elevating and praising to bad-mouthing, criticizing and cutting his way forward in the world of motion pictures. Underground, drug movies; alchemy in 24 frames per second, celluloid culture from the 60s through our times". (translated by Paul Crowson)

== Drognapló ==
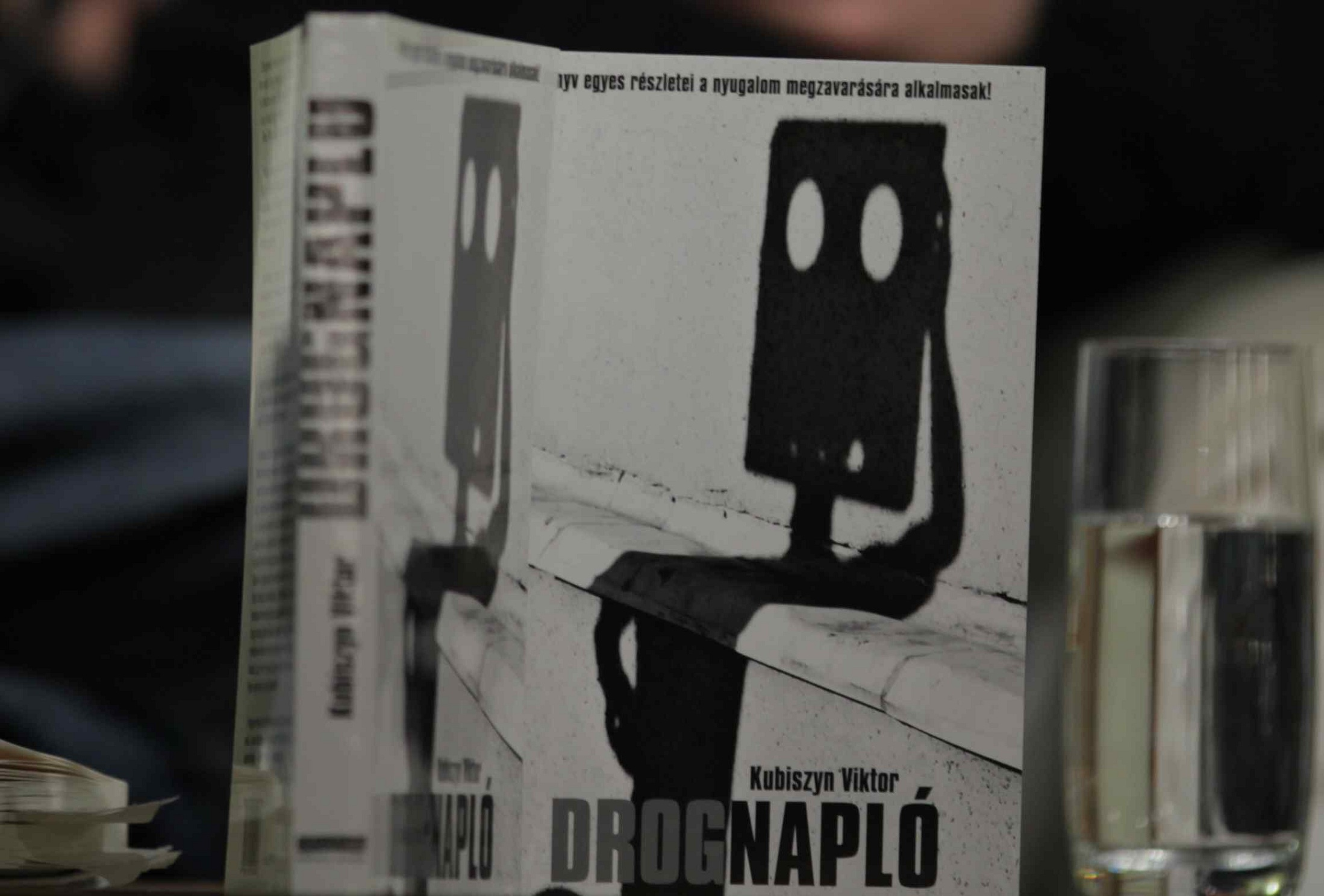
Drognapló

His first novel, Drognapló (Drug Diary), a documentary autobiographical novel, was published in 2011 by Jószöveg Műhely Kiadó . Drognapló draws from a very important part of the author's life. The writer, who quit his drug addiction of his own accord, received a request from the Hungarian literary portal, Litera, on the first anniversary of his rebirth in 2010 to write a diary. This short story-like infernal trip piqued the publishing house's interest, so they decided to order the writing of a whole book based on the story.

=== Written interviews (in Hungarian) ===
- Adél Hercsel, Istent nem kellett kihúzni a mondatból, prae.hu, 22 March 2012.
- Miklós Balatincz, „Az, hogy valaki túléli, nincs benne a pakliban" – interview with Viktor Kubiszyn, comitatusfolyoirat.blogspot.hu, 7 July 2012.
- Éva Marton, „A kannásbor lett a bázisdrogom", hvg.hu, 13 July 2012.
- Anita Libor, A kábítószer rohadt hálás téma, Könyves Magazin, 5 December 2011.
- Zsuzsanna Bagdán, A megtért emberek kriptaszökevények, reformatus.hu, 3 April 2012.
- Márta Várnagyi, Mikor herkás múzsa adta a puszit – életművek a drog után, kultography.hu, 26 June 2012.

=== Radio interviews ===
- Talk about the book, Tilos Radio – Kolorlokál with András Csejdy and Zoltán Rozgonyi, 2 November 2011.
- Interview, Civil Radio – Református Félóra, 26 January 2012.
- Lajos Jánossy's critique of Drug Diary, Bartók Radio – Irodalmi újság, 28 January 2012.
- Interview with Anita Bak n, MR1-Kossuth Rádió, 29 November 2011.
- Interview with Dénes Dudits Radio Q, 13 March 2012.
- Phone interview, Klubrádió – Bemutató példány, 21 March 2012.
- Minden kapcsolat elvész – Interview by Gergely Horváth – Petőfi Radio – 7 June 2012.
- Interview with Sarolta Vlasics – Kossuth Radio – Irodalmi újság, 15 July 2012.
- Interview with Gábor Gönczi – Mária Radio – Függő kérdések, 4 July 2012.

=== TV appearances ===
- SzolnokTV – Aktuális, 16 May 2012.
- Duna Televízió – 1 könyv, 27 February 2012.

=== Other media ===
- Chapters from the book (in Hungarian), Mindennapi.hu], 29 December 2011.
- Betti Varga, Pletykák, drogok, klasszikus hibák, Kötve-fűzve, 30 December 2011.
- Anita Pethő, Egy kupac remegés, Prae.hu, 23 February 2012.
- Adél Tossenberger, Hibrid, punk, HVG extra Business, 2012/ 1. 14 May 2012.
- English excerpts from Drug Diary – Hlo.hu, 21 August 2012.

=== Audiobook ===
Drognapló is available in Hungarian audiobook format, on a free CD. It contains 6,5 hours of audio in mp3, the author's reading his own book. It was made in 8 sessions in April 2012, with sound engineer/editor Dániel Balog in Tilos Radio.

=== Videos ===
Hungarian online magazine ”Index" shot a video about his past junkie life in the 8th district of Budapest and his rehab and faith in God. The short film consists of three parts: in the first part the author talks about his way of life in the 8th, the viewer can see the slummy surrounding and also some photos about Kubiszyn from the past. In the second part the author's having a conversation with one of the social workers who deals with disadvantaged Romani youth day by day. In the third chapter we get an inside look into a Hungarian rehab where Kubiszyn got help in getting rid of his addictions. He tells stories about how he wrote his book Drug Diary, how he lived in this institution, has a little conversation with one of the inmates and at the end he explains his faith in God.
