= Erzsébet Bajári =

Hungarian entomologist

- Born: Erzsébet Némethné; 1912
- Died: 1963 (aged 50–51)
- Education: Eötvös Loránd University
- Occupation: Wasp researcher

Erzsébet Némethné Bajári (born Erzsébet Némethné) and published as Erzsébet N. Bajári; (1912–1963) was a Hungarian entomologist, specifically a wasp researcher.

== Biography ==
Bajári graduated from the Biography Chemistry Faculty of Eötvös Loránd University in Budapest, Hungary as a teacher.

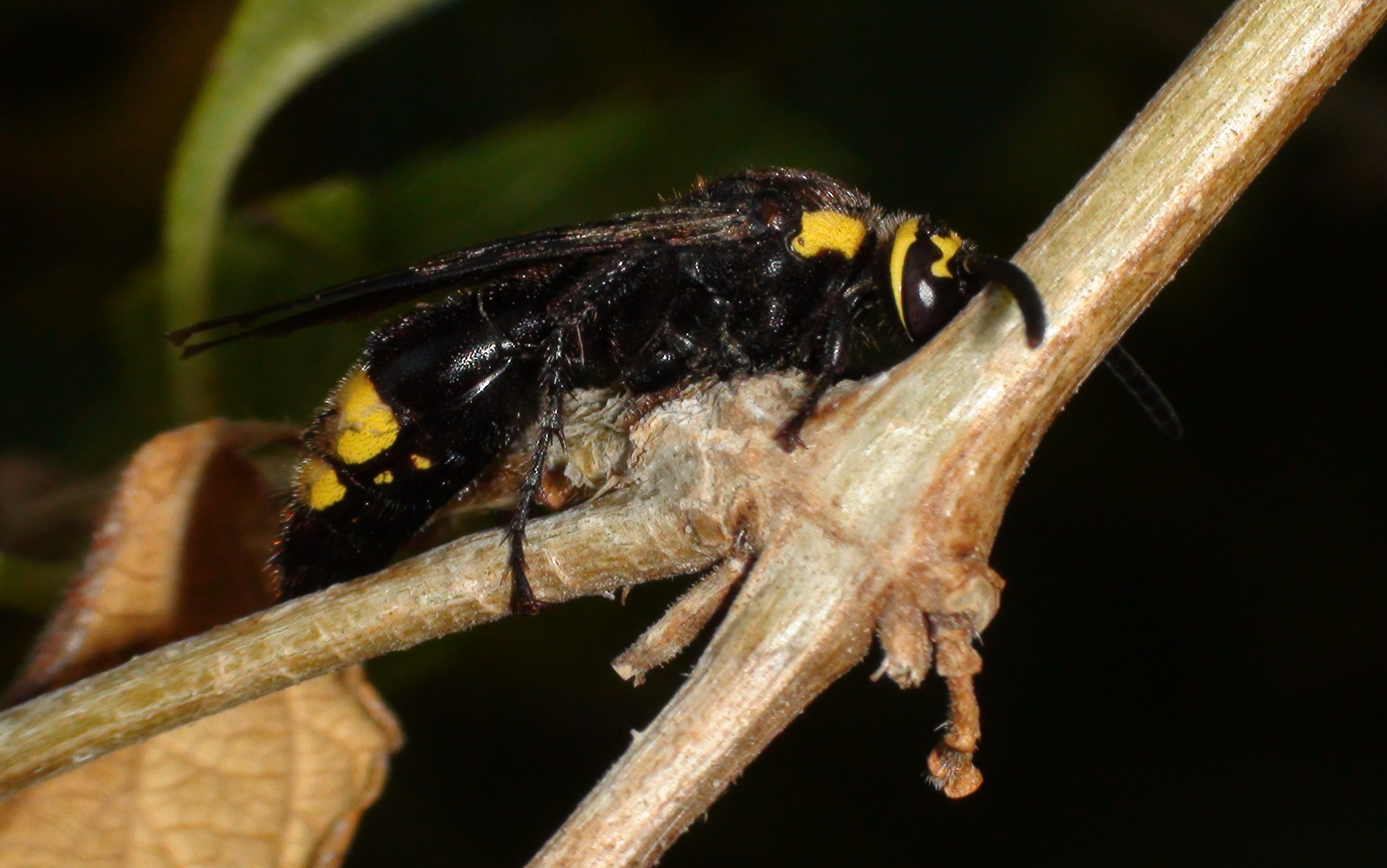
Scolia anatoliae dagger wasp captured in Dalyan, Muğla, Turkey

In 1948, she took a position at the Hymenoptera (insect) collection of Hungarian Natural History Museum, and starting in 1954, continuing until her early death 1963, she was the curator of the collection. At the beginning she started to process the collection of scraper wasps (Sphecidaes), and then started to assemble and process a huge part of the collection of real wasps (Ichneumonidaes).

Since the death in 1915 of Győző Szépligeti, the collection's previous researcher, the museum's collection had lacked a Hungarian researcher making it a difficult part of the collection. With Bajári's expertise, she became the first domestic specialist in decades to undertake this work.

Bajári took over as editor of The Folia Entomologica Hungarica journal in 1963, but her sudden death shortly thereafter prevented her from completing the issue she had begun.

She died in 1963.

== Selected works ==
- Fauna catalog of the families Methocidae, Myrmosidae and Mutillidae A Methocidae, Myrmosidae és Mutillidae családok faunakatalógusa. (Cat. Hym. V.) Rovartani közlemények: a Magyar Rovartani Társaság kiadványa = Folia entomologica Hungarica, 1954. (7. évf.) 1. sz. 65-80. oldal (Társszerző: Dr. Móczár László)
- Dagger wasps. Tőrösdarázs alkatúak – Scolioidae 1956 (Magyarország Állatvilága - Fauna Hungariae XIII. kötet 3. füzet 1-35 old.
- Scraper wasps I. Kaparódarázs alkatúak I. – Sphecoidae I. 1957 (Magyarország Állatvilága – Fauna Hungariae XIII kötet 7. füzet. 1-117 old.
- Scout wasps I. Fürkészdarázs-alkatúak I. – Ichneumonoidae I. 1960 Akadémiai Kiadó, Budapest, (Magyarország Állatvilága – Fauna Hungariae XI. kötet 4. füzet, 72 ábrával) 266 oldal.
- Scout wasps XII. Fürkészdarázs-alkatúak XII. – Ichneumonoidae XII. 1962 Akadémiai Kiadó, Budapest, (Magyarország Állatvilága – Fauna Hungariae XI. kötet 15. füzet, 24 ábrával. Társszerző: Dr. Győrfi János) 54 oldal.
