= György Sebestyén =

Austrian writer

György Sebestyén (30 October 1930 – 6 June 1990) was a Hungarian-Austrian writer, radio dramatist and screenwriter.

== Life ==
Born in Budapest, Sebestyén grew up bilingual in Budapest – as was often the case at the time. He published his first novel in Hungarian. The ethnology graduate fled to Vienna in 1956 after the Hungarian Revolution of 1956, in which he had actively participated. From then on, he published in German. In 1963, Sebestyén became an Austrian citizen. From 1988 to 1990, he was president of the Österreichischer PEN-Club.

He was the editor of the cultural magazine Pannonia, financed by the province of Burgenland, and published by the province of Lower Austria.

Sebestyén died in Vienna at the age of 59.

== Honours and prizes ==
- 1975: Franz-Theodor-Csokor-Preis
- 1976: Anton Wildgans Prize
- 1987: Decoration of Honour for Services to the Republic of Austria.
- 1989: Peter-Rosegger-Literaturpreis of the Province of Styria.

== Work ==
- Die Türen schließen sich, 1957
- Der Mann im Sattel oder Ein langer Sonntag, 1961
- Die Schule der Verführung, 1964
- Flötenspieler und Phantome. Eine Reise durch das Tauwetter, 1965
- Anatomie eines Sieges. Blitzkrieg um Israel, 1967
- Burgenland, wo sich die Wege kreuzen, 1977
- Thennberg oder Versuch einer Heimkehr. Roman. Braumüller Literaturverlag, Wien 2010. ISBN 978-3-99200-009-8.
- Albino, 1984
- Die Werke der Einsamkeit, 1986
- Reise durch das Tauwetter – Když nastala obleva, edited by Haimo L. Handl, mit einem Nachwort von Heide Breuer, Übersetzung aus dem Deutschen ins Tschechische von Helena Tesarikova. Illustrationen von Robert Petschinka. Driesch Verlag, Drösing 2013, ISBN 978-3-902787-07-1
