= Gyula Németh (linguist) =

Hungarian linguist and turkologist (1890–1976)

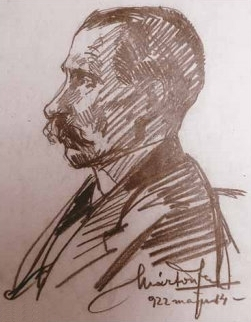
- Born: November 2, 1890; Karcag, Hungary
- Died: December 14, 1976 (aged 86); Karcag, Hungary
- Scientific career
- Workplaces: Hungarian Academy of Sciences

Gyula Németh (Hungarian: Németh Gyula; November 2, 1890 – December 14, 1976), commonly known in English as Julius Németh was a Hungarian linguist and turkologist and member of the Hungarian Academy of Sciences.

== Career ==
He worked at the Faculty of Humanities of the Eötvös Loránd University.

== Works ==
- Gyula Németh (1916). Türkische Grammatik. G. J. Göschen.
- Julius Németh (1917). Türkische Grammatik. G.J. Göschen'sche Verlagshandlung.
- Gyula Németh (1917). Türkische-deutsches gesprächsbuch. G.J. Göschen.
- Gyula Németh; Gyula Káldy-Nagy (1976). Hungaro-Turcica: studies in honor of Julius Németh. Loránd Eötvös Univ. ISBN 978-963-461-058-8.
- Gy Németh (1967). Korosi Csoma - Archivum. Brill Archive. pp. 209–. GGKEY:0EHTYU3WC4P.
