= András Bereznay =

Hungarian-British cartographer and historian

- Born: Budapest, Hungary
- Education: University of Budapest
- Occupation: Historical cartographer

András Bereznay is a Hungarian-British historical cartographer and historian, specialising in the compilation of maps for historical atlases. Born in Budapest, he left Hungary in 1978 and is based in London. Bereznay has researched and compiled historical maps, on a great variety of subjects, for numerous publishers. He has a particular interest in ethnographical and other thematic maps.

== Education and employment ==
Educated for five years at the Faculty of Humanities of the University of Budapest, he received the equivalent of an M.A. in History and Spanish. From 1974 to 1978 he was a freelance editor of historical maps, working for the Historical Institute of the Hungarian Scientific Academy, and preparing maps of the many-volume History of Hungary, and for a research group at ELTE University compiling a series of maps about Eastern European history.

Bereznay left Hungary in 1978 for political reasons and settled in London. He has worked as a freelance historical map editor, and as a cartographer for many British, American and other publishers. He created all the maps for The Times Atlas of European History; Richard J. Evans' trilogy The Coming of the Third Reich, The Third Reich in Power, and The Third Reich at War; and The Times Kings and Queens of the British Isles. Bereznay created all the maps for Evans' 2016 The Pursuit of Power: Europe 1815-1914.

== Writings on political geography ==
Bereznay has written extensively about issues of political geography: mostly in Hungarian, also in English in The Times. From 2008 to 2014, he was a regular contributor to Magyar Nemzet, a Hungarian national daily newspaper, with over 40 articles, both maps and accompanying text.

In 2009, he was invited to present a paper at an international conference on the Historical Cartography of Transylvania at the University of Cluj. His submission, "The depiction of Transylvania in Roumanian Historical Atlases published 1920–2000", was debarred by the conference organizers. His own account of this incident has been published in Hungarian.

== Historical Atlas of Transylvania ==
Detail of plate 34 of Erdély történetének atlasza

In 2011, Méry Ratio published Erdély történetének atlasza (Historical Atlas of Transylvania), with text and 102 plates of maps by Bereznay. A detail to the right illustrates Bereznay's use of color, texture and outline to show several features simultaneously on the same map from the atlas is shown to the right. In 2012, this atlas received a special award from the President of Hungary. Bereznay undertook a lecture tour in Transylvania to discuss this work, and also presented it in Norway.

== Historical Atlas of the Gypsies ==
In 2018, Méry Ratio published A Cigányság Történetének Atlasza (Historical Atlas of the Gypsies), with text and plates of maps by Bereznay, the first historical atlas of the Romani people.

== Historical atlases in English ==
In 2021, Méry Ratio published in English both Historical Atlas of Transylvania and Historical Atlas of the Gypsies: Romani History in Maps. In June 2022, these English-language editions were described as "very profound and in-depth" in a review in the CUP journal Nationalities Papers.
