= György Csepeli =

Hungarian social psychologist, sociologist, politician and professor emeritus

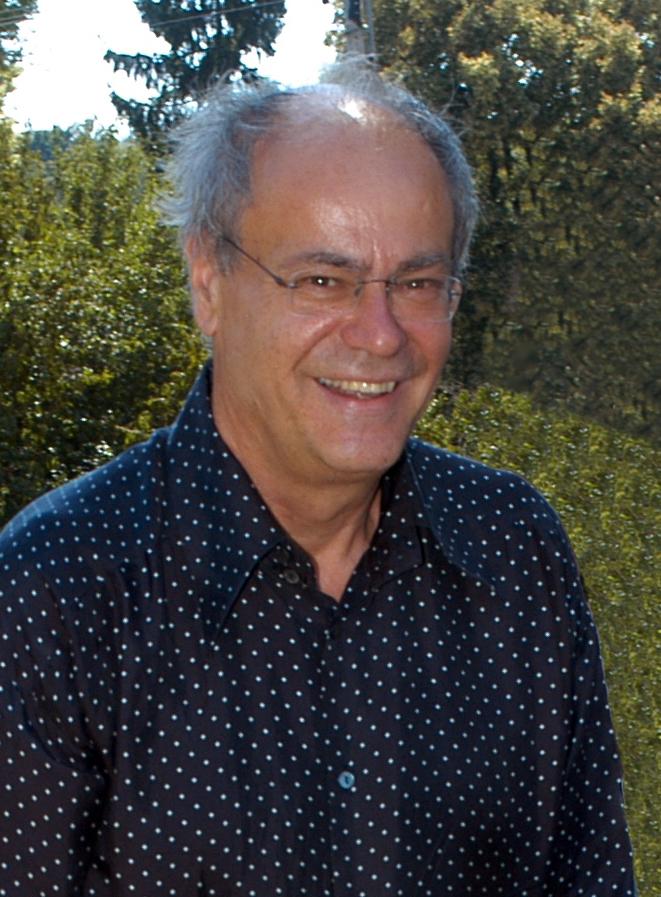
- Born: 14 February 1946 (age 80); Budapest, Hungary
- Education: Eötvös Loránd University (ELTE)
- Known for: Psychology; Sociology
- Awards: Ferenc Erdei Prize, 1980; Minorities Award, 1996
- Scientific career
- Fields: Social psychology; Antiziganism; Antisemitism; Information society
- Workplaces: Eötvös Loránd University (ELTE); University of Miskolc
- Website: website in English

György Csepeli (Hungarian: [ˈt͡ʃɛpɛli ˈɟørɟ]; born 14 February 1946) is a Hungarian social psychologist, sociologist, politician, professor emeritus at the Eötvös Loránd University (ELTE), former Under Secretary of State for Political Affairs at the Ministry of Information of Hungary. His research, books, papers and talks focus on antiziganism, antisemitism and foundational problems of information society and social psychology.

== Biography and career ==
In 1980 he was awarded the candidate (C.Sc.) degree in Social psychology.

From 1986 until 2001 he acted as the head of the Social Psychology, ELTE.

He completed his Doctor of Science (D.Sc.) degree in sociology in 1991 and then he received the title of university (full) professor at the Department of Social Psychology at the Institute of Sociology, ELTE in the same year.

From 2019 he is the vice-president of the World Complexity Science Academy (WCSA) and associate editor of the journal of WCSA.

His main fields of interest are in the antiziganism, antisemitism and foundational problems of information society and social psychology.

In November 2023, the Hungarian Academy of Sciences awarded him the József Eötvös wreath for his internationally known and recognized work in the field of domestic social psychology, a pioneer in the field of intergroup relations, national feeling and consciousness, anti-Semitism, anti-Gypsyism, xenophobia for his significant research, for the examination of the economic and social effects of artificial intelligence that radically changes human life in all areas, as well as for his latest work entitled The Awakening of Values, in which he continues the work of Elemér Hankiss, Károly Varga and Ibolya Váriné Szilágyi, who practice Hungarian value research at a high level.

== Awards and honours ==
- 1980 Ferenc Erdei Prize
- 1996 Minorities Award
- 2020 Rézler Gyula award of the Hungarian Academy of Sciences
- 2023: The Board of the Hungarian Academy of Sciences awarded him with the József Eötvös wreath in recognition of his outstanding scientific work
- 2024: Hazám-díj (My Country Prize)
- 2024: Pro Ingenio Prize
- 2026: Mensch Prize

== Selected works ==
=== Books ===
- 2020 Nation and Migration. Budapest: CEU Press (coauthored with A. Örkény)
- 2000 Grappling with National Identity. How nations see each other in Central Europe. Coauthored with A. Örkeny and M. Szekelyi Budapest: Akadémiai Kiadó
- Csepeli, Gy., Örkény, A., Székelyi, M. 2000. Grappling with national identity : how nations see each other in Central Europe. Szalay, É. (transl.) Budapest: Akadémiai Kiadó.
- Hagendoorn, L., Pepels, J., Cinnirella, M., Crowley, J., Witte, H., Verbeeck, G., Portengen, R., Westin, C., Junco, J.A., Nassehi, A., Peri, P., Jasinska, A., Pechacova, Z., Cerny, V., Malová, D., Mego, P., Csepeli, Gy., Örkény, A., Liiceanu, A., Bekeshkine, I., Djintcharadze, N., Farnen, R. 2000. In Hagendoorn, L., Csepeli, Gy., Dekker, H., Farnen, R., (eds.) European Nations and nationalism : theoretical and historical perspectives. Aldershot: Ashgate
- Csepeli, Gy. 1997. National identity in contemporary Hungary. Fenyo, M.D. (transl.) Boulder: Social Science Monographs; Highland Lakes: Atlantic Research and Publications, Inc.; New York: Distributed by Columbia University Press
- 1992 Ideology and Political Beliefs in Hungary. The Twilight of State Socialism. (coauthored with A. Orkeny) London: Pinter Publishers
- Csepeli, Gy. 1989. Structures and contents of Hungarian national identity : results of political socialization and cultivation. Frankfurt M., Bern: Lang
