= ELTE School of English and American Studies =

School in Budapest, Hungary

School of English and American Studies
- ELTE BTK Angol-Amerikai Intézet
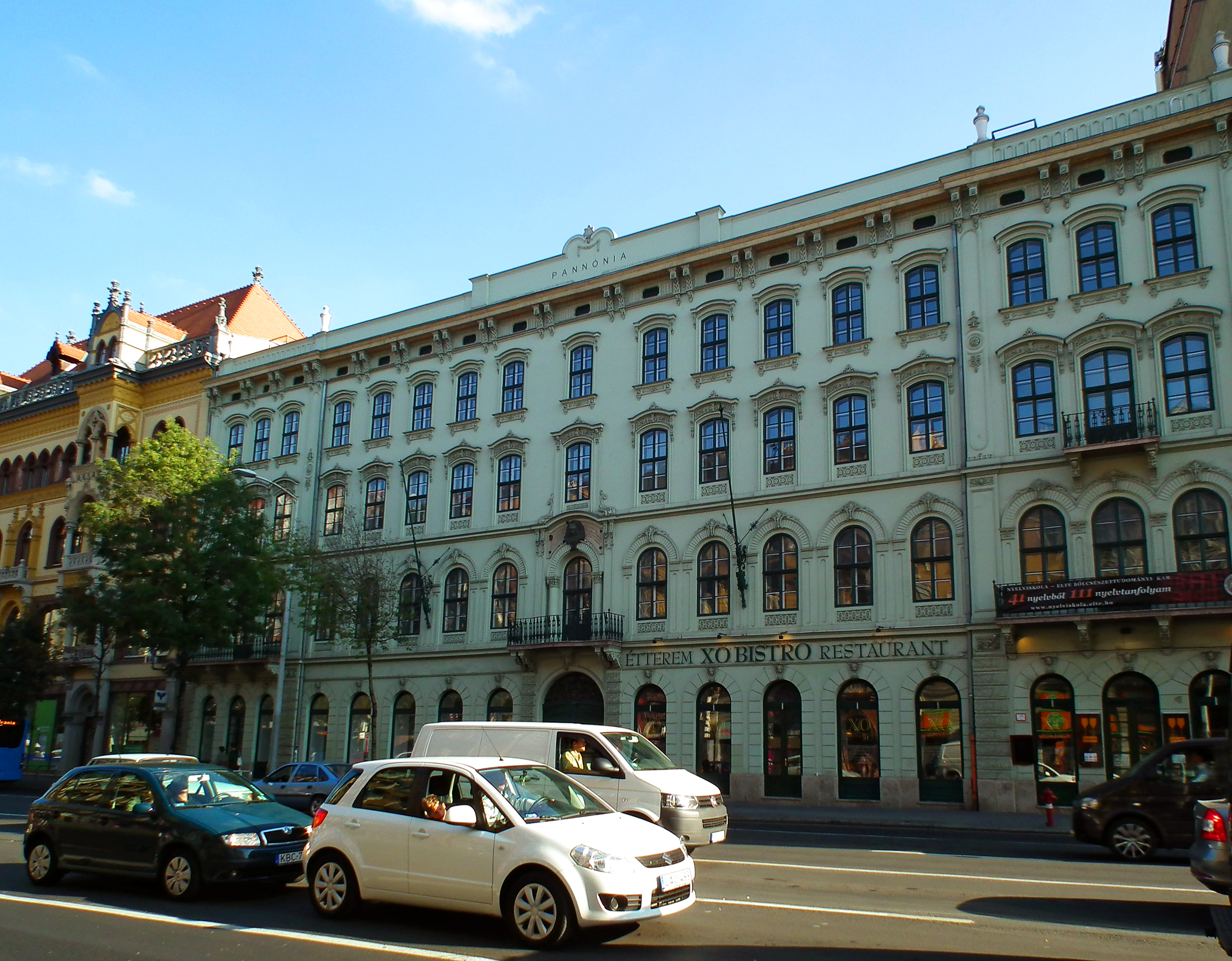
- The building of the School of English and American Studies in Rákóczi út
- Established: 1886
- Director: János Kenyeres
- Students: 1,500
- Location: 8 Rákóczi út, Budapest, 1088, Hungary; 47°29′40″N 19°03′41″E
- Campus: Urban
- Language: English
- Website: btk.elte.hu

The School of English and American Studies (SEAS) of the Faculty of Humanities of Eötvös Loránd University was founded in 1886 as the Department of English Language and Literature and it is located at Rákóczi út 5 in Józsefváros, Budapest, Hungary. Along with the Department of English of the University of Vienna, the School of English and American Studies is one of the biggest English departments in Central Europe.

== History ==
In 1886, Ágoston Trefort, the Hungarian Minister of Religion and Education from 1882 to 1888 and the President of the Hungarian Academy of Sciences from 1885 to 1888, requested and commissioned Arthur Patterson to teach English language at the Hungarian Royal University.

In 1898, Arthur Yolland was appointed lector and later a teacher at the Hungarian Royal University.

In 1924, Antal Szerb, prominent Hungarian author, obtained a degree in teaching English and German languages at the Department of English Language and Literature.

In 1937, Miklós Szenczi established the lectorate that was financed from his own salary from 1941.

From 1945, László Országh taught at the department for a short period.

In 1947, the Institute of American and English Studies was established.

In 1947, Miklós Szenczi was appointed the Director of the Department of English Language and Literature. However, he was removed from his position in 1949 for political reason. In the same year, Miklós Szenczi was the appointed director of the institute. However, in 1948, the short-lived institute was dissolved for political reasons.

Tibor Lutter was appointed Head of the Department of English in 1949 and he led the department until 1956. In 1957, Miklós Szenczi was reinstated as head of the department.

In 1990, the department was relocated to Ajtósi Dürer sor in Városliget, Zugló, Budapest.

After the end of communism in Hungary, as of 1989, the Russian language was no longer an obligatory subject at Hungarian primary and secondary schools. Therefore, the demand for English education increased significantly. In response, the Centre for English Teacher Training was established in 1990.

In 1990, Péter Medgyes founded the International Association of Teachers of English as a Foreign Language-Hungary in order to facilitate communication among teachers and share useful methods and techniques in teaching English.

In 1994, the School of English and American Studies was founded to accommodate a modern institutional structure for the specialist fields taught in the institution and to be able to process the increasing number of students.

The early 2000s saw several changes at Eötvös Loránd University. The Faculty of Teachers' Training College (in Hungarian: Tanárképző Főiskolai Kar) was dissolved while SEAS continued teacher education. First, a separate department was created for teachers' education led by Zsuzsanna Tóth. However, this separate department was dissolved and later the Department of English Language Pedagogy was founded.

In 2007, the School of English and American Studies was relocated to the Trefort Campus (Józsefváros) in Rákóczi út 5. This way, all the institutes of the Faculty of Humanities could be housed at the Trefort Campus.

In 2011, SEAS celebrated the 125th anniversary of foundation of its legal predecessor by publishing a book entitled 125 éves az angol szak.

In 2013, anti-semitic stickers were placed by vandals on the doors of the instructors. The SEAS also expressed their concert with antisemitic provocation.

In 2017, the SEAS expressed its solidarity with Central European University.

On 16 September 2022, Tibor Frank, founding member and twice former director of SEAS and member of the Hungarian Academy of Sciences, died after a short illness.

In 2023, Imre Salusinszky, Australian journalist, political adviser, and English literary academic, was a visiting scholar at the Department of English Language Pedagogy.

On 30 March 2026, Ádám Nádasdy, the school's former professor emeritus and head of the Department of English Linguistics, died at the age of 79.

In November 2026, the Department of English Language Pedagogy and the Department of English Applied Linguistics celebrated their 30th anniversary of their doctoral school with a 2-day conference. The plenary speakers included world-known scholars from the field such as Alastair Henry, Judit Kormos, Péter Medgyes, Simone Pfenninger, and Roberto Valdeón.

== Organization ==
The management consists of the director and two deputy directors.

=== Institute leadership ===
Title	Name
Director of the School	János Kenyeres
Director for Scholarly Affairs	Vera Benczik
Director of Studies	Tímea Tiboldi

=== Directors of Institute ===
Department/Institute	Heads/Directors
Department of English Language and Literature (1886–1994)	Arthur Patterson (1886–1889); Arthur Yolland (1908–1946); Miklós Szenczi (1947–1949); Tibor Lutter (1949–1956); Miklós Szenczi (1957–1967); László Kéry (1967–1973); László Báti (1973–1978); Péter Egri (1978–1983); Aladár Sarbu (1983–1990); Ádám Nádasdy (1991–1992); Veronika Kniezsa (1992–1994)
American Studies Group (1990–1994)	Zoltán Kövecses (1990–1994)
Centre for English Teacher Training	Péter Medgyes
Directors of the School (1994–)	Tibor Frank (1994–2002); Géza Kállay (2002–2006); Ágnes Péter (2004–2005); Tibor Frank (2006–?); Géza Kállay (2010); Tibor Frank (2011–2014); János Kenyeres (2015–)

=== Departments ===
There are 5 departments at the School of English and American Studies.

Department	Acronym	Head
Department of American Studies	DAS	Zoltán Kövecses (1994–1997); Enikő Bollobás (1997–?); János Kenyeres
Department of English Applied Linguistics	DEAL	Dorottya Holló (1994–2005); Edit Kontra (2005–2014); Kata Csizér (2014–2019); Enikő Öveges (2019–2022); Éva Illés (2022–2023); Ágnes Albert (2024–)
Department of English Linguistics	DELG	László Varga (1994–1997); Ádám Nádasdy (1997–2004); Miklós Törkenczy (2004–2011); Péter Szigetvári (2011–2023); Zoltán Kiss G. (2023–)
Department of English Language Pedagogy	DELP	Péter Medgyes (1994–1996); Christopher Ryan (1997); Péter Medgyes (1998–2002); Éva Major (2002–2005); Uwe Pohl (2005–2010); Krisztina Károly (2014–?)
Department of English Studies	DES	Ágnes Péter (1994–1997); Ferenc Takács (1997–2000); István Géher (2001–2005); Győző Ferencz (2005–2009); Judit Friedrich (2009–?); Ákos Farkas (2014–2019); Zsolt Komáromy (2019–)

== Programs ==
There are one bachelor and two masters programs at SEAS.

Level	
Bachelor's degree	English and American studies
Master's degree	English
Master's degree	American Studies
Teacher education	teachers’ BA-cum-MA (OTAK)
Doctor of Philosophy	American Studies Doctoral Program (AMER); Medieval and Early Modern English Culture and Literature Doctoral Program (AIKK); Modern English and American Literature and Culture Doctoral Program (MODA); Gender in English and American Literature and Culture Doctoral Program (GEND); English Linguistics Doctoral Programme; Language Pedagogy and English Applied Linguistics Doctoral Program

== Research ==
=== Publications ===
==== Journals ====
- overSEAS
- The AnaChronist
- angolPark
- The Even Yearbook
- The Odd Yearbook
- Working Papers in Language Pedagogy (WoPaLP)

==== Festschrifts ====
The following festschrifts have been published:

- At the Crossroads of Human Fate and History (Tibor Frank Festschrift, 2019)
- Built upon His Rock: Writings in Honour of Péter Dávidházi (2018)
- 70 snippets to mark Ádám Nádasdy's 70th birthday (2017)
- Heroes and Saints: Studies in Honour of Katalin Halácsy (2015)
- Inspirations in Foreign Language Teaching: Studies in Language Pedagogy and Applied Linguistics in Honour of Péter Medgyes (2015)
- Whack fol the dah: Writings for Ferenc Takács on his 65th Birthday (2013)
- „Úgyse hiába”: Emlékezések és tanulmányok a műhelyalapító Géher István tiszteletére (2013)
- VLlxx: Papers Presented to László Varga on his 70th Birthday (2013)
- Essays for the 60th Birthday of Enikő Bollobás (2012)
- Studies in Applied Linguistics: In Honour of Edit H. Kontra (2012)
- Rare Device: Writings in Honour of Ágnes Péter (2011)
- Who to Believe Expecting What: Writings for István Géher on his 70th Birthday (2010)
- The Reality of Ruminations: Writings for Aladár Sarbu on his 70th Birthday (2010)
- Emlékkönyv Frank Tibor 60. születésnapjára (2008)
- The Metaphors of Sixty: Papers Presented on the Occasion of the *60th Birthday of Zoltán Kövecses (2006)
- Kapu a tengerhez: Kortárs skót költők antológiája / A Gateway to the Sea: Anthology of Contemporary Scottish Poetry (1998)

==== Annual ====
- DEAL 2020
- DEAL 2021
- DEAL 2022
- DEAL 2023

=== Research groups ===
- Equal chances in Language Learning Research Group
- Budapest Research Centre for Linguistic Theory (BRaCeLeT)
- Experimental and theoretical investigation of vowel harmony patterns
- Cultural Memory
- Equal Rights in Language Learning (2007–2010)
- Research into the Motivation of Hungarian Language Learners (2005–2007)

=== Researchers ===
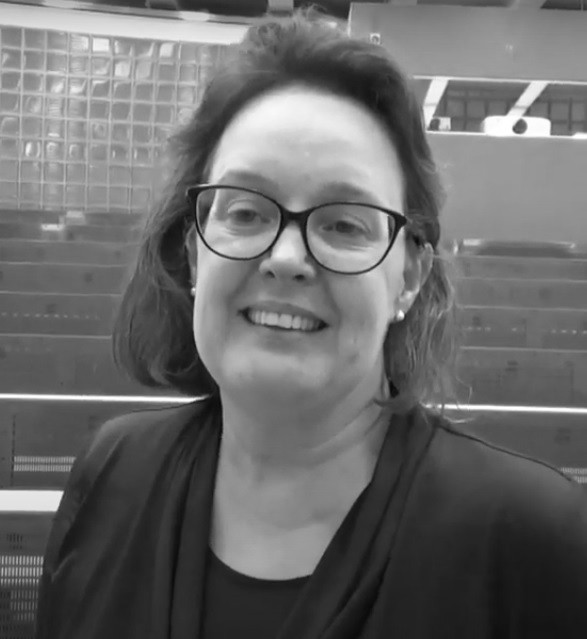
Kata Csizér, the most cited researcher based on Google Scholar

The following is a list of the researchers based on Google Scholar.

Citations	Researcher
10000–50000	Kata Csizér (DEAL), Zoltán Kövecses (DELG)
5000–10000	Marcel Den Dikken (DELG),
1000–5000	Krisztina Károly (DELP), Péter Siptár (DELG), Mark Newson (DELG), Ildikó Lázár (DELP), Katalin Piniel (DEAL)
500–1000	Ágnes Albert (DEAL), Péter Szigetvári (DELG), Gyula Tankó (DEAL)
100–500	Brigitta Dóczi (DEAL), László Varga (DELG), Anna Zólyomi (DELP)

- Department of American Studies (DAS), Department of English Applied Linguistics (DEAL), Department of English Language Pedagogy (DELP), Department of English Linguistics (DELG), Department of English Studies (DES)

== Conferences ==
The School of English and American Studies organises four to five conferences annually:

- Contemporary Crossroads (annual conference organised by the Department of English Applied Linguistics)
- International Student Poster Presentation Conference
- Language Testing and Assessment Conference (annual conference organised by the Department of English Applied Linguistics)
- Össznyelvész (annual conference organised by the Department of English Linguistics)
- The Reel Eye (annual conference organised by the Department of English Studies)

== Notable alumni ==
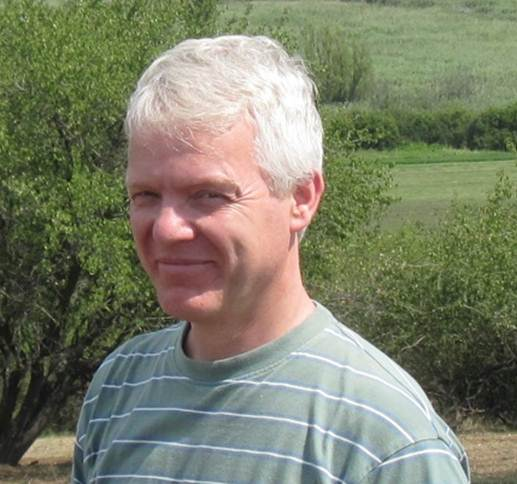
Zoltán Dörnyei obtained a degree at the SEAS

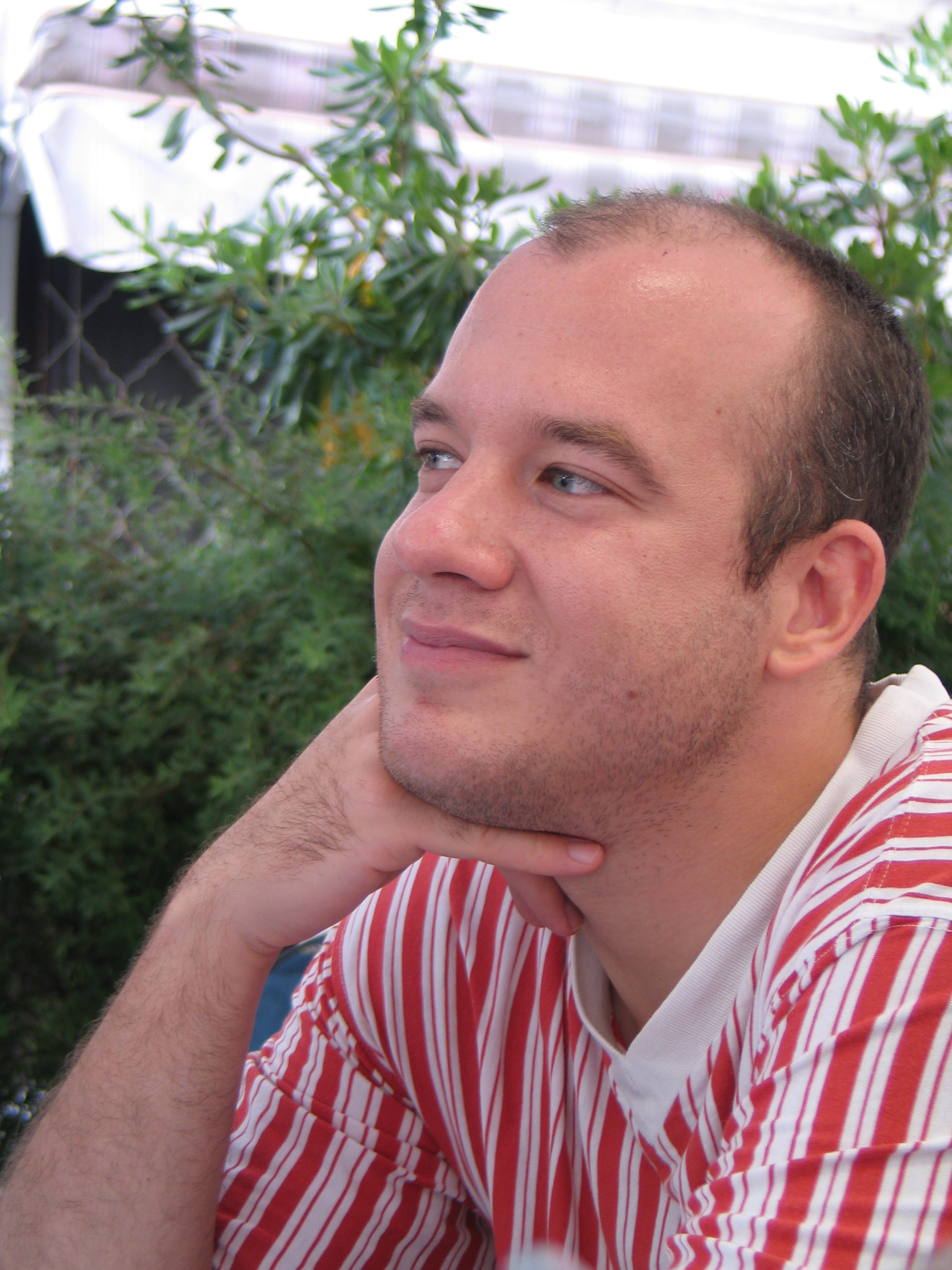
András Gerevich obtained a degree at the SEAS, He was also adjunct professor at SEAS from 2011 till 2014

- Zsófia Bán, linguist
- Kata Csizér, linguist
- Zoltán Dörnyei, linguist
- Kinga Fabó, poet
- Tibor Frank, historian
- András Gerevich, poet
- Elemér Hankiss, sociologist
- Judit Hidasi, linguist
- Balázs Hidvéghi, politician
- Judit Kormos, linguist
- Zoltán Kövecses, linguist
- Gábor Kósa, orientalist
- Péter Medgyes, linguist
- Anna Nagy, journalist
- Ádám Nádasdy, linguist
- Eszter Ónodi, actress
- Zsuzsa Rakovszky, writer
- Ágnes Szokolszky, psychologist
- István Tótfalusi, writer
