= Judit Hidasi =

Hungarian linguist, japanogist, professor of communication

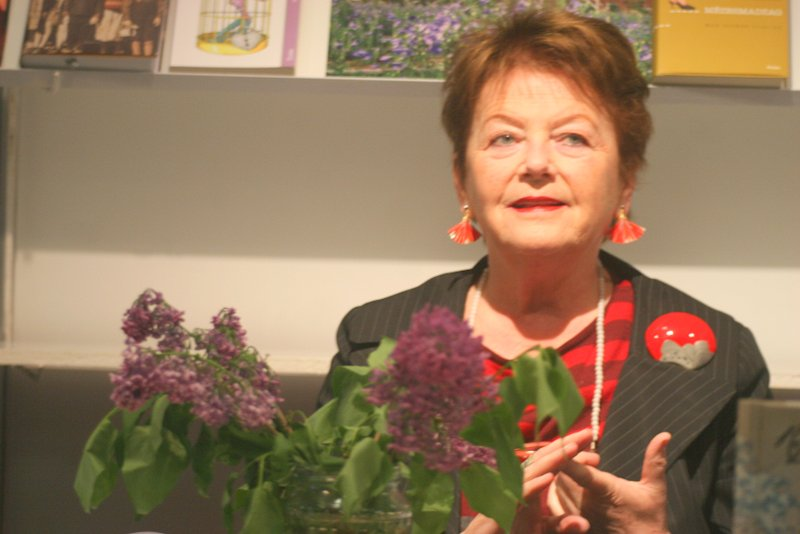
- Photo of Judit Hidasi
- Born: 11 July 1948 (age 78); Budapest, Hungary
- Education: Eötvös Loránd University
- Known for: Intercultural communication Japanology
- Awards: Order of the Rising Sun, 3rd Class, Gold Rays with Neck Ribbon (2005)
- Scientific career
- Fields: Applied linguistics; Communication and Media Sciences
- Workplaces: Budapest Business School; Josai International University; Sapientia University

Judit Hidasi (Hungarian: [ˈˈjudit ˈhidɒʃi]; born 11 July 1948) is a Hungarian linguist, professor of communication at Faculty of International Management and Business, Budapest Business School.

== Biography and career ==
Hidasi was born on 11 July 1948 in Budapest. She earned M.A. degrees at the Eötvös Loránd University, Faculty of Humanities, School of English and American Studies in English and Russian Philology in 1971, and in General and Applied Linguistics in 1976.

In 1971 she began to teach in what was then the Foreign Language Department at Budapest College for Foreign Trade (until 1971, it has been the International Management and Business College, and from 2001 it has become the Faculty of International Management and Business of Budapest Business School). She earned a candidate of linguistics degree in 1986. In 1988 she earned a B.A. in Business Administration at Budapest College for Foreign Trade, and was then appointed head of the Department of Russian Language at the International Management and Business College. She was head of department until 1992 and deputy principal in charge of Academic and International Affairs from 1989 to 1993 at the Budapest College for Foreign Trade.

She worked at the college until 1997 where she not only lectured but took part in scientific researches and was appointed its deputy general director for international affairs from 1991 until 1997. In 1992 she founded the Institute of Oriental Communication Studies and managed it until 1998. In 1997 she habilitated. She acted as a Deputy Head of the Department of International Bilateral Relations at the Ministry of Education and as a secretary of the Hungarian Scholarship Board from 1998 until 2001.

In 1999 she was appointed to university (full) professor and became the head of the Department of Applied Linguistics at the Berzsenyi Teacher Training College, Szombathely. From 2001 to 2006 she was visiting professor of the Department of International Communication at the Kanda University of International Studies .

In 2006 she was appointed dean of the Faculty of International Management and Business, Budapest Business School where she has served until 2012.

She has also lecturered as a visiting professor at Sapientia University, Cluj-Napoca, Romania since 2012, and at Josai University, Sakado, Japan since 2015.

She has been a full professor of communication and director for International Relations, Budapest Business School since 2012.

== Committee memberships ==
- Japan Society for Multicultural Relations (Tabunka Kankei Gakkai), member – 2002
- International Society for Intercultural Education and Research (SIETAR): SIETAR Japan, member – 2001
- The Asiatic Society, member – 2001
- European Association of Japanese Studies (EAJS), 1996–2003 Council member; since 2003 member – 1996
- International Society for Intercultural Education and Research (SIETAR): SIETAR Europe, member – 1995

== Awards and honors ==
- "For the Development of Education" by the Minister of Trade of Hungary – 1992
- "Citoyenette d`Honneur Sociale Pro Pace et Unitate Senatorie Meritu Honoris Causa" by the Council of Europe – 1994
- "Ágoston Trefort Prize" by the Minister of Education, Hungary – 2000
- Order of the Rising Sun, 3rd Class, Gold Rays with Neck Ribbon –2005

== Bibliography ==
- Kálmán Bolla, ed. (2009). Hidasi Judit (PDF) (in Hungarian). Magyar nyelvész pályaképek és önvallomások (Hungarian linguists) 85. Budapest: Zsigmond Király Főiskola. Archived from the original (PDF) on 2016-06-25. ISBN 978-963-9559-44-8

== Selected works ==
=== Books ===
- Intercultural Communication: An outline, Sangensha, Tokyo, 2005.

=== Papers ===
- "The Role of Stereotypes in a New Europe" (PDF). Intercultural Communication Studies. 1999–2000 (9): 117–122.
- H. J. & Yulia V. Lukinykh (2009). A comparison of Russian and Hungarian Business Cultures (PDF). Budapesti Gazdasági Főiskola – Magyar tudomány ünnepe. pp. 1–8. Archived from the original (PDF) on 2014-02-25.
