= Tamás Weiszburg =

Hungarian geologist, mineralogist and university professor

Tamás Gábor Weiszburg (publishing as Tamás G. Weiszburg) is a Hungarian geologist, mineralogist, university lecturer and science organiser. He has taught at Eötvös Loránd University (ELTE) in Budapest since 1980 and also works with the Hungarian-language higher-education community in Cluj-Napoca, Romania. He was president of Hungary's National Council of Student Research Societies (Országos Tudományos Diákköri Tanács, OTDT) from 2021 to 2025. His work encompasses environmental mineralogy, archaeometry, scientific collections and university-level research mentoring.

== Education and academic career ==
Weiszburg graduated in geology from Eötvös Loránd University in 1980 and joined its Faculty of Science as an instructor that year. He received a PhD in Earth sciences from ELTE in 1996, completed a habilitation at the University of Miskolc in 2006 and another at ELTE in 2015. He has headed ELTE's Department of Mineralogy and previously directed its mineral collection, a historical university teaching collection.

He has taught in Cluj-Napoca since 1998, contributing to Hungarian-language university education and research training in Transylvania. His official academic record lists a professorial appointment at Sapientia University beginning in 2021. His teaching subjects include mineralogy, mineral identification and analytical methods applied to Earth and environmental materials.

== Research ==
His research areas include the mineralogy and crystal chemistry of iron-rich layered silicates, analytical studies of natural and industrial solid materials, environmental mineralogy, mineralogical history and archaeometry. Some of his projects apply electron microscopy and other analytical techniques to objects of cultural heritage.

In a 2017 paper in Analytical Chemistry, Weiszburg and collaborators investigated the gilding technology of medieval metal threads by electron-optical and micro-Raman analysis. He co-authored a 2019 study of the management, surveying and geological heritage of the open-air Geological Garden in Tata, Hungary. He was also involved in the university's mineral collection and its public presentation.

== Scientific organisation and student research ==
Weiszburg chaired the international organising committee of the 20th General Meeting of the International Mineralogical Association (IMA), held in Budapest on 21–27 August 2010. The association identifies him separately from the meeting's general and scientific chair.

He began supervising undergraduate student research projects in 1981 and became involved in the nationwide student research movement in 1982. According to his 2025 biographical profile, students under his supervision presented 26 papers at national student research conferences between 1997 and 2023; two of those students received the Pro Scientia Gold Medal. The programme known as TDK Határok Nélkül (Student Research Without Borders), introduced in 2013, supported participation from Hungarian-language universities outside Hungary. Weiszburg helped establish the programme and was its first academic director. From 2016, he also took part in the academic leadership of the Collegium Talentum doctoral mentoring programme.

He served as president of the OTDT for the 2021–2025 term. On 18 June 2025 the organisation elected László Mátyus as his successor, with the change of president taking effect on 25 November 2025.

== Science teacher education ==
Weiszburg was among the initiators of an integrated five-year Hungarian teacher-training programme in natural sciences and environmental studies, popularly called the Z-szak. Developed through cooperation among universities, it first admitted students for the 2022 academic year. In a 2022 interview, he discussed the shortage of teachers in physics and chemistry and the rationale for teaching natural phenomena through several scientific disciplines rather than exclusively separate school subjects.

== Awards and honours ==
- 2013 – Knight's Cross of the Hungarian Order of Merit (civil division), for scientific organisation and international cooperation in mineralogy.
- 2020 – Medzihradszky Kálmán Award of ELTE's Faculty of Science; Lóczy Lajos Memorial Plaque of the Hungarian Geological Society; Signum Aureum Universitatis of the University of Miskolc.
- 2025 – Bonis Bona lifetime achievement award for mentoring and talent development.

== Selected publications ==
- Weiszburg, T. G., et al. (2017). "Medieval Gilding Technology of Historical Metal Threads Revealed by Electron Optical and Micro-Raman Spectroscopic Study of Focused Ion Beam-Milled Cross Sections". Analytical Chemistry, 89(20), 10753–10760. doi:10.1021/acs.analchem.7b01917.
- Szente, I.; Takács, B.; Harman-Tóth, E.; Weiszburg, T. G. (2019). "Managing and Surveying the Geological Garden at Tata (Northern Transdanubia, Hungary)". Geoheritage, 11, 1353–1365. doi:10.1007/s12371-019-00407-9.
