= Ádám Nádasdy =

Hungarian linguist and poet (1947–2026)

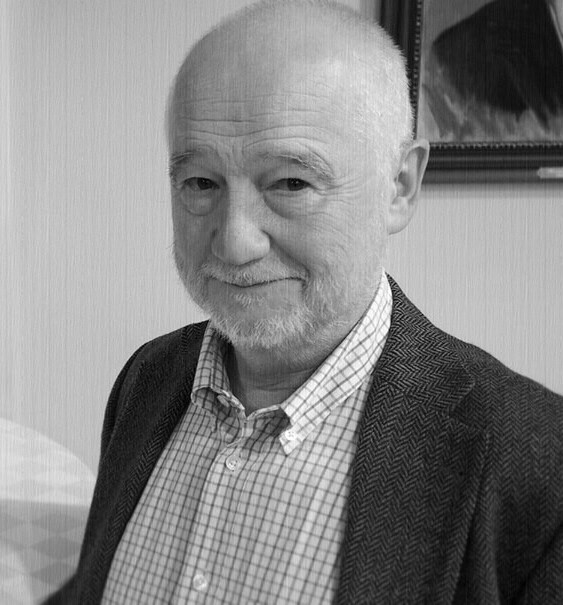
- Born: 15 February 1947; Budapest, Hungary
- Died: 29 March 2026 (aged 79)
- Education: Eötvös Loránd University
- Occupations: Linguist; teacher; poet; translator; essayist
- Years active: 1972–2026
- Spouse: Márk Patczai (m. 2019)
- Children: 2
- Parents: Kálmán Nádasdy (father); Lilian Birkás (mother)

Ádám Nádasdy (15 February 1947 – 29 March 2026) was a Hungarian linguist, teacher, poet, translator and essayist.

Nádasdy taught linguistics at the Faculty of Humanities of Eötvös Loránd University between 1972 and 2018, achieving the rank of professor in 2012. He is considered one of the most prominent Hungarian translators of Shakespeare, and he also gained recognition for his translation of Dante's Divine Comedy.

== Early life and education ==
Ádám Nádasdy was born in Budapest on 15 February 1947, into a relatively wealthy middle-class family. Of Danube Swabian ancestry, his father, Kálmán Nádasdy, was a prominent director of opera, theatre and film. His mother, opera singer Lilian Birkás was born in Prague and had Austrian, Dalmatian and Danube Swabian heritage. Nádasdy had two-half brothers from his mother's previous marriage to lawyer Géza Birkás: trader Balázs Birkás and painter Ákos Birkás.

During his early years, the family owned two apartments in a building in Budapest, and he lived there with his parents, maternal grandparents and half-brothers. His maternal grandparents, who spoke to him in German, played a major role in his upbringing due to his parents' work commitments. In an interview, he stated, "We were speaking in every sort of language [in the family], all mixed up: German, Italian, a bit of French." In his youth, Nádasdy took piano lessons for six years, yet later he never pursued music professionally. He went to Hungarian-language schools growing up, graduating from Toldy Ferenc Gymnasium in 1965.

By his own account, he "fell in love" with the English language at the age of nine, and he credited musical influences as a key factor in his enthusiasm for linguistics. After high school, he studied English and Italian at the Faculty of Humanities of Eötvös Loránd University (ELTE), obtaining a teacher's degree in 1970. While studying at university, he performed as a vocalist and pianist in a beat band. After graduation, he taught at a high school for two years.

== Academic career ==
=== Education ===
In 1972, Nádasdy took up a position as an assistant lecturer at the Department of English Language and Literature of the ELTE Faculty of Humanities, subsequently becoming a lecturer in 1978 and associate professor in 1995. Nádasdy held several leading positions at the faculty: head of the Department of English Language and Literature (1990–1991), deputy director of the School of English and American Studies (1994–1997) and head of the Department of English Linguistics (1997–2003). After the end of communism, he also led the educational reform committee of the Faculty of Humanities between 1991 and 1993, which carried out the alignment of undergraduate education with teacher training, and eliminated the previous fixed-curriculum structure.

Nádasdy was appointed professor in 2012. In 2013, he was forced into retirement from his university position along with several other elderly staff members of the Faculty of Humanities in a controversial measure attributed to poor financial conditions. In 2017, he was awarded a professor emeritus degree, and continued to teach at the university until 2018.

=== Research ===
Nádasdy's linguistic work focused on the Hungarian and English languages. His main areas of research included phonology and phonetics, historical linguistics and etymology. He described himself as an adherent of post-generative phonology. He was also interested in Yiddish philology. In his academic and popular science work, he represented a descriptive approach to language.

In 1975, he spent a semester at the University of Cambridge as part of a postgraduate programme, where he studied general phonetics and Indo-European philology. He obtained his doctorate in 1977 with a dissertation titled Phonology and morphophonology in the English curriculum. In 1994, he was awarded a Candidate of Linguistics degree for his dissertation Unstressed and semi-stressed syllables in English. He completed his habilitation in 2006 at the ELTE Faculty of Humanities.

=== Popular science ===
From 1992 to 1997, he hosted Nyelv-ész-érvek, an educational linguistics programme on the public radio station Bartók Rádió. He wrote a regular column in the magazine Magyar Narancs, popularizing linguistics. Nádasdy gave a lecture on Mindentudás Egyeteme (University of All Knowledge), a science television series featuring academics, in November 2003 on the topic "Why does language change?".

== Literary work ==
=== Poetry and essays ===
Nádasdy produced his literary work only in Hungarian, noting that he never considered writing in English because he found Hungarian "far more exciting."

=== Translation ===
He translated plays by Shakespeare into Hungarian (often seen as ground-breaking after the "classic" translations of János Arany and others), namely The Comedy of Errors, A Midsummer Night's Dream, Taming of the Shrew, Hamlet, Romeo and Juliet, Twelfth Night, As You Like It, and The Tempest. His Hungarian translation of the Divine Comedy by Dante was published in 2016.

== Personal life and death ==
Besides Hungarian, Nádasdy spoke English, German, Italian and French.

In 2019, he entered into a same-sex marriage with surgeon Márk Patczai. He was previously married to academic Zsuzsa Tóth, with whom he has two daughters.

=== Death and tributes ===
Nádasdy died on 29 March 2026, at the age of 79. His death was announced by historian András Török. His funeral was held on 16 April 2026 at Farkasréti Cemetery in Budapest.

In a statement Eötvös Loránd University said that Nádasdy was "a prolific poet and essayist, known for his clarity of thought, gentle irony, and profound humanism. As a literary translator, he achieved exceptional acclaim. His renderings of Shakespeare – and, most recently, Dante – offered fresh, resonant voices to classical texts, opening them to a broad and appreciative readership." Moholy-Nagy University of Art and Design wrote, "His lectures did more than impart knowledge – they opened up a way of thinking that revealed both the freedom and the responsibility inherent in language, culture, and human relationships." The Daily Telegraph wrote an obituary calling him "Hungary’s most accomplished translator" and "leading anti-Orbán intellectual." They further wrote, "Nádasdy was one of Hungary’s most accomplished translators, producing celebrated modern Hungarian versions of Shakespeare and Dante. His translations were prized for their balance between fidelity and vitality, bringing canonical texts into a contemporary idiom without sacrificing their depth." Numerous poets, linguists, and professors also paid tribute to Nádasdy including András Gerevich, Peter Sherwood, George Szirtes, Eszter Tarsoly, Christopher Whyte, András Török, Zoltán Csehy, Renátó Fehér, and Gabriella Nagy.

== Awards and honours ==
- 1990: Tibor Déry Prize
- 1993: Robert Graves Prize for his poem Mezőtúr
- 2000: Milán Füst Prize
- 2003: Budapestért Prize for "his successful work in promoting modern, scientifically grounded thought on the Hungarian language, as well as for his literary translations"
- 2004: Officer's Cross of the Order of Merit of the Republic of Hungary in recognition of "his exemplary scientific work in linguistics, as well as literary and educational activities"
- 2005: Laurel Wreath Award of the Republic of Hungary for "his poetry and bold-spirited literary translation work"
- 2012: László Országh Prize
- 2016: Moholy-Nagy Prize
- 2017: Artisjus Grand Prize for Literature
- 2020: Alföld Prize
- 2020: AEGON Literature Prize for his poetry volume Jól láthatóan lógok itt

== Bibliography ==
=== Linguistics ===
==== Popular linguistics ====
- Hárompercesek a nyelvről [Three-Minute Writings on Language] (in Hungarian). Budapest: Osiris. 1999. ISBN 978-963-379-648-1—co-authored with László Kálmán.
- Ízlések és szabályok: Írások nyelvről, nyelvészetről, 1990–2002 [Tastes and Rules: Writings on Language and Linguistics, 1990–2002] (in Hungarian). Budapest: Magvető. 2003. ISBN 978-963-14-2307-5.
- Prédikál és szónokol [Prédikál and szónokol] (in Hungarian). Budapest: Magvető. 2008. ISBN 978-963-14-2639-7.
- Milyen nyelv a magyar? [What Kind of Language is Hungarian?] (in Hungarian). Budapest: Corvina. 2020. ISBN 978-963-13-6643-3.
- Milyen nyelv az angol? [What Kind of Language is English?] (in Hungarian). Budapest: Corvina. 2024. ISBN 978-963-13-7044-7.
- Szmoking és bermuda: Nyelvészeti írások [Szmoking and bermuda: Writings on Linguistics] (in Hungarian). Budapest: Magvető. 2025. ISBN 978-963-14-4453-7.

=== Poetry ===
- Komolyabb versek [More Serious Poems] (in Hungarian). Budapest: Szépirodalmi. 1984. ISBN 978-963-15-2722-3.
- A bőr és a napszakok: Nádasdy Ádám majdnem minden verse, 1976–1995 [The Skin and the Times of the Day: Almost All Poems of Ádám Nádasdy, 1976–1995] (in Hungarian). Szeged: 2000 Könyvek. 1995. ISBN 978-963-7577-10-9.
- Elkezd a dolgok végére járni: Versek, 1995–1998 [Starts to Get to the End of Things: Poems, 1995–1998] (in Hungarian). Budapest: Magvető. 1998. ISBN 978-963-14-2109-5.
- A rend, amit csinálok [The Order I Make] (in Hungarian). Budapest: Magvető. 2002. ISBN 978-963-14-2289-4.
- Soványnak kéne lenni [One Should Be Thin] (in Hungarian). Budapest: Magvető. 2005. ISBN 978-963-14-2436-2.
- Az az íz [That Flavour] (in Hungarian). Budapest: Magvető. 2007. ISBN 978-963-14-2566-6.
- Verejték van a szobrokon: Válogatott és új versek, 1976–2009 [There Is Sweat on the Statues: Selected and New Poems, 1976–2009] (in Hungarian). Budapest: Magvető. 2010. ISBN 978-963-14-2758-5.
- Nyírj a hajamba [Trim My Hair] (in Hungarian). Budapest: Magvető. 2017. ISBN 978-963-14-3505-4.
- Jól láthatóan lógok itt [I Am Hanging Here in Plain Sight] (in Hungarian). Budapest: Magvető. 2019. ISBN 978-963-14-3860-4.
- Billeg a csónak: Versek, 2019–2023 [The Boat is Rocking: Poems, 2019–2023] (in Hungarian). Budapest: Magvető. 2024. ISBN 978-963-14-4413-1.

=== Essays and short stories ===
- A vastagbőrű mimóza: Írások melegekről, melegségről [The Thick-Skinned Mimosa: Writings About Gays and Gayness] (in Hungarian). Budapest: Magvető. 2015. ISBN 978-963-14-3251-0.
- A szakállas Neptun [The Bearded Neptune] (in Hungarian). Budapest: Magvető. 2020. ISBN 978-963-14-4019-5.
- A csökkenő költőiség. Tanulmányok, beszélgetések Shakespeare és Dante fordításáról [The Decreasing Poeticity: Studies and Conversations on the Translation of Shakespeare and Dante] (in Hungarian). Budapest: Magvető. 2021. ISBN 978-963-14-4124-6.
- Hordtam az irhámat [I Carried My Hide] (in Hungarian). Budapest: Magvető. 2023. ISBN 978-963-14-4306-6.
- Londoni levelek [Letters from London] (in Hungarian). Budapest: Magvető. 2025. ISBN 978-963-14-4532-9.
