= Tibor Frank =

Hungarian historian (1948–2022)

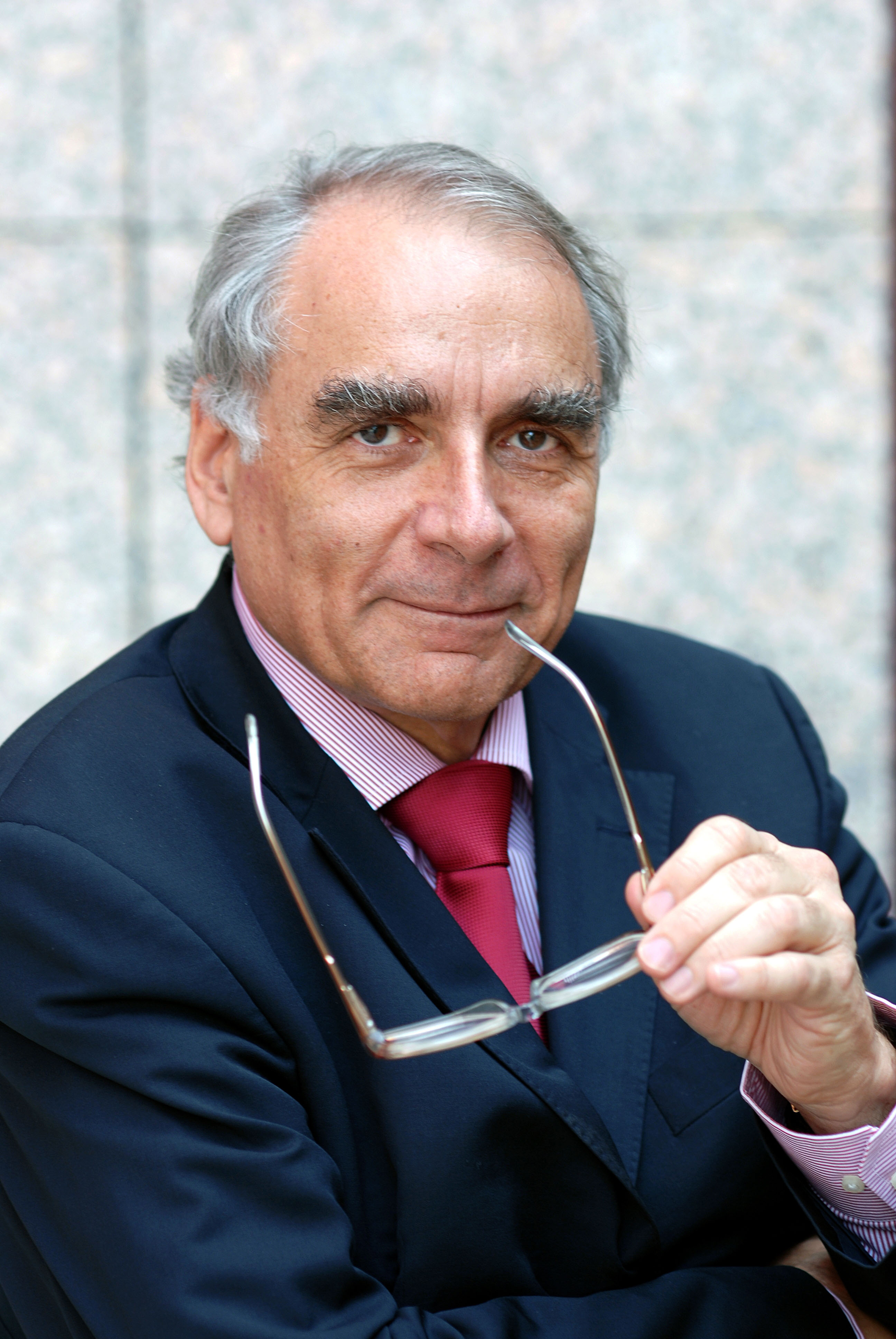
- Frank in 2015
- Born: 3 February 1948; Budapest, Hungary
- Died: 15 September 2022 (aged 74); Budapest, Hungary
- Occupations: Historian, Professor of History
- Spouse: Zsuzsa F. Várkonyi
- Awards: Humboldt Prize

Academic work
- Institutions: Eötvös Loránd University (ELTE)
- Website: http://www.franktibor.hu

Tibor Frank (3 February 1948 – 15 September 2022) was a Hungarian historian who was professor of history at the School of English and American Studies of the Faculty of Humanities of the Eötvös Loránd University (ELTE). He was director of its School of English and American Studies (1994–2001, 2006–2014). From 2013 he was corresponding member of the Hungarian Academy of Sciences (MTA), as of 2019 he was a full member.

== Biography ==
Tibor Frank was born in 1948 in Budapest, Hungary. He graduated from Eötvös Loránd University in 1971 with an M.A. in History and English, obtaining his Dr. Univ. in Modern History there (1973). He received his Ph.D. in history at the Hungarian Academy of Sciences (1979), his habilitation in history at ELTE in 1996, and his D.Litt. at the HAS in 1998. He also attended Cambridge University, England (Christ's College in 1969, Darwin College in 1980–1981).

== Academic career ==
Frank started his career at ELTE in the Department of Modern History (1971–73) and continued at the Department of English Studies (1973–90), where he taught British history. He was one of the founding members of the Department of American Studies in ELTE in 1990 and chair from 1992 to 1994. In Spring 2000 he set up the Ph.D. program in American Studies at ELTE and continued as its program director until the end of his life.

Frank's areas of research were the period from 1848 to 1945; with respect to international migrations; international images, stereotypes, and propaganda; transatlantic relations; historiography; music and politics.

Professor Frank was chairman of the Commission of History of the Hungarian Academy of Sciences (2017–), chairman of the 2nd Bolyai Grant Program (2016–) and a member of the Book and Journal Commission of the academy. Frank founded Hungary's Modern Filológiai Társaság of Hungarian Academy of Sciences [Modern Language Association of HAS] in 1983, and served the association as secretary general from 1983 to 1996 and as vice president between 1996 and 2007. He served as member on the board of Historical Abstracts (Santa Barbara—Oxford, 1989–93, 2000–2008), Nationalities Papers (New York, 1989–2009), Polanyiana (Budapest, 1994–), the European Journal of American Culture (Nottingham, England, 1998–) and Külügyi Szemle (and Foreign Policy Review, 2011–). From 2015 he was editor of Századok, journal of the Hungarian Historical Association.

Frank was co-president (1994–2001), and became honorary president in 2004, of the Hungarian Association of American Studies and was a board member of the European Association for American Studies (EAAS, 1994–2001). He was a member of the board of the U.S.─Hungarian Fulbright Commission (between 1999 and 2002, 2009–2011, 2013–); from 2010 to 2011 and again from 2017 he was chairman of the U.S.—Hungarian Fulbright Board. Between 2007 and 2015 he was deputy chairperson of Magyar Történelmi Társulat (Hungarian Historical Society), in 2015 he was elected chairman of the editorial board of its journal Századok.

=== Visiting professorships and research grants ===
Between 1988 and 1990 Tibor Frank was a Fulbright Visiting Professor of History at the University of California, Santa Barbara (UCSB) and also at UCLA. In 1990–91 he was invited to the University of Nevada, Reno (UNR) as a distinguished visiting professor of history sponsored by the National Endowment for the Humanities. Between 1988 and 1997 he taught at UCSB Summer Sessions; between 1994 and 1997 he was founder and director of UCSB's The New Europe program. He was an István Deák Chair Visiting Professor at the history department of Columbia University in the City of New York in 2001, 2007, and 2010. His Humboldt Prize of 2002 took him to the Max-Planck-Institut für Wissenschaftsgeschichte (Max Planck Institute for the History of Science) in Berlin, Germany.

From 1992 he was a regular visiting professor at the Education Abroad Program of the University of California in Budapest, Hungary (1992–2008), at the Salzburg Seminar's Center for the Study of American Culture and Language in Salzburg, Austria (1995), in the Nationalism Studies Program of the Central European University (CEU), Budapest, Hungary (1999–2001), in the UNESCO-sponsored Minority Studies Program of the Institute of Sociology of ELTE (1995, 1997), and the IES Abroad Vienna (formerly Institute of European Studies) in Vienna, Austria (1999–). Between 2003 and 2009 he acted as a team leader, with Frank Hadler (GWZO, Leipzig), of the European Science Foundation Programme "Representations of the Past: The Writing of National Histories in Nineteenth and Twentieth Century Europe" (Team 4: "Overlapping National Histories"), coedited as Disputed Territories and Shared Pasts: Overlapping National Histories in Modern Europe, published by Palgrave Macmillan in 2011.

== Honors and awards ==
Tibor Frank was awarded the Országh Award in 2000, the Humboldt Forschungspreis (Humboldt Research Award) from the Alexander von Humboldt Foundation for 2002, and the Szent-Györgyi Albert-díj (Albert Szent-Györgyi Prize) of the government of Hungary in 2005. He was elected Fellow of the Royal Historical Society, London in 2006.

== Family ==
Frank was married to psychologist and author Zsuzsa F. Várkonyi, an honorary university professor.

== Books ==
- The British Image of Hungary 1865-1870 (Budapest: L. Eötvös University, 1976), 369 p.
- Marx és Kossuth (Budapest: Magvető, 1985), 165 p.
- Egy emigráns alakváltásai. Zerffi Gusztáv pályaképe 1820-1892 (Budapest: Akadémiai Kiadó 1985), 330 p.
- Aru bomeisha no henshin: Zerufi Gusutaavu Den (Tokyo: Sairyu Sha, 1994), 381 p
- Ethnicity, Propaganda, Myth-Making: Studies on Hungarian Connections to Britain and America 1848-1945 (Budapest: Akadémiai Kiadó, 1999)
- From Habsburg Agent to Victorian Scholar: G. G. Zerffi 1820–1892 (New York: Columbia University Press, 2000)
- Ein Diener seiner Herren: Werdegang des österreichischen Geheimagenten Gustav Zerffi (1820–1892) (Wien—Köln—Weimar: Böhlau Verlag, 2002)
- (Ed.) Discussing Hitler: Advisers of U.S. Diplomacy in Central Europe, 1934–1941 (Budapest—New York: CEU Press, 2003)
- (Ed.) Ever Ready to Go: The Multiple Exiles of Leo Szilard, Vol. I-III (Berlin: Max-Planck-Institut für Wissenschaftsgeschichte, 2004)
- Picturing Austria-Hungary: The British Perception of the Habsburg Monarchy 1865–1870 (New York: Columbia University Press, 2005)
- Hangarii Seiou-Gensou no Wana – Senkanki no Kaneibeiha to Ryoudomondai (ハンガリー西欧幻想の罠 – 戦間期の親英米派と領土問題; Hungary Trapped in Western Illusions – Anglophiles and treaty revision during World War II ) (Tokyo: Sairyu Sha, 2008)
- (Hg.) Zwischen Roosevelt und Hitler. Die Geheimgespräche eines amerikanischen Diplomaten in Budapest 1934–1941 (Berlin: Duncker & Humblot, 2009)
- Double Exile: Migrations of Jewish-Hungarian Professionals through Germany to the United States 1919–1945 (Oxford: Peter Lang, 2009)
- Tibor Frank and Frank Hadler (eds), Disputed Territories and Shared Pasts: Overlapping National Histories in Modern Europe (Basingstoke: Palgrave Macmillan, 2011, pb. 20152)
- Kettős kivándorlás: Budapest—Berlin—New York 1919–1945 (Budapest: Gondolat, 2012, 2nd ed. 2015)
- Szabadság és felelősség: Az Egyesült Államok és a németországi nácitlanítás a második világháború után (Akadémiai székfoglaló, 2013) (Budapest: Magyar Tudományos Akadémia, 2014), 91 p.
- Britannia vonzásában (Budapest: Gondolat, 2018), 306 p.
- Amerika világai (Budapest: Gondolat, 2018), 600 p.
- Szalonvilág - A polgári érintkezés modernizálódása a 19. században (Budapest: Rózsavölgyi és Társa, 2020), 208 p.

Textbooks

- Tibor Frank and Tamás Magyarics: Handouts for British History: A Study Guide and Workbook (1st ed. 1992, 3rd ed. Budapest: Tankönyvkiadó, 1994), 329 p.
- Tibor Frank and Tamás Magyarics: Handouts for U.S. History: A Study Guide and Workbook (2nd ed. Budapest: PANEM, 1999, 479 p.; 3rd revised ed. Budapest: Antall József Tudásközpont, 2018, 663 p.)

Edited books

- Erzsébet Perényi and Tibor Frank, eds: Studies in English and American, Vol. 2 (Budapest: Eötvös University, 1975), 472 p.
- Tibor Frank and Erzsébet Perényi, eds: Studies in English and American, Vol. 3 (Budapest: Eötvös University, 1977), 251 p.
- Studies in English and American, Vol. 4 (Budapest: Eötvös University, 1978), 283 p.
- Tanulmányok a Magyar Rádió történetéből 1925-1945 (Budapest: Tömegkommunikációs Kutatóközpont, 1975), 438 p.
- Frank Tibor és Hoppál Mihály, szerk.: Hiedelemrendszer és társadalmi tudat (Budapest: Tömegkommunikációs Kutatóközpont, 1980), 341 + 301 p.
- The Origins and Originality of American Culture (Budapest: Akadémiai Kiadó, 1984), 801 p.
- Values in American Society (Budapest: ELTE, 1995), 270 p.
- Roosevelt követe Budapesten. John F. Montgomery bizalmas politikai beszélgetései 1934-1941 (Budapest: Corvina Kiadó, 2002), 351 p.
- Discussing Hitler: Advisers of U.S. Diplomacy in Central Europe, 1934–1941 (Budapest—New York: CEU Press, 2003), 376 p.
- Ever Ready to Go: The Multiple Exiles of Leo Szilard, Vols. 1-3 (Berlin: Max-Planck-Institut für Wissenschaftsgeschichte, 2004), 447 p.
- Angliától Nagy-Britanniáig. Magyar kutatók tanulmányai a brit történelemről (Budapest: Gondolat Kiadó, 2004), 405 p.
- John F. Montgomery: Magyarország, a vonakodó csatlós, 2. kiadás (Budapest: Zrínyi Kiadó, 2004), 335 p.
- Gál István: Magyarország és az angolszász világ (szerk. Frank Tibor, Gál Ágnes és Gál Julianna) (Budapest: Argumentum Kiadó - OSZK, 2005), 947 p.
- Honszeretet és felekezeti hűség. Wahrmann Mór 1831-1892 (Budapest: Argumentum Kiadó, 2006), 693 p.
- Gyarmatokból impérium. Magyar kutatók tanulmányai az amerikai történelemről (Budapest: Gondolat Kiadó, 2007), 366 p.
- Zwischen Roosevelt und Hitler. Die Geheimgespräche eines amerikanischen Diplomaten in Budapest 1934–1941 (Berlin: Duncker & Humblot, 2009), 401 p.
- Frank Tibor és Károly Krisztina, szerk.: Anglisztika és amerikanisztika. Magyar kutatások az ezredfordulón (Budapest: Tinta Könyvkiadó, 2009), 438 p.
- Frank Tibor és Károly Krisztina, szerk.: Gateways to English: Current Hungarian Doctoral Research (Budapest: ELTE Eötvös Kiadó, 2010), 376 p.
- Tibor Frank and Frank Hadler, eds: Disputed Territories and Shared Pasts: Overlapping National Histories in Modern Europe (Basingstoke: Palgrave Macmillan, 2011), 430 p.
- Németföldről Németországba. Magyar kutatók tanulmányai a német történelemről (Budapest: Gondolat Kiadó, 2012), 364 p
- Frank Tibor és Károly Krisztina, szerk.: 125 éves a budapesti angol szak. Doktorandusztanulmányok (Budapest: ELTE Eötvös Kiadó, 2012), 158 p
- Frank Tibor és Károly Krisztina, szerk.: Az angol tudománya. 125 éves az egyetemi angol szak, 1886-2011 (Budapest: ELTE Eötvös Kiadó, 2013), 360 p.
- Az orosz birodalom születései. Magyar kutatók tanulmányai az orosz történelemről (Budapest: Gondolat, 2016), 414 p.
