= Zoltán Kövecses =

Hungarian Linguist

- Born: 23 September 1946 (age 80); Újpest, Hungary
- Occupation: academic
- Known for: cognitive linguistics, metaphor

Academic background
- Education: Eötvös Loránd University

Academic work
- Discipline: linguistics, cognitive linguistics
- Institutions: Eötvös Loránd University
- Website: Kövecses on the website of Eötvös Loránd University

Zoltán Kövecses (born 23 September 1946 in Újpest) is a Hungarian linguist and former water polo player. He is a professor emeritus at the School of English and American Studies of the Faculty of Humanities of Eötvös Loránd University.

== Academic career ==
He earned a Master of Arts degree from the Eötvös Loránd University in 1972. His first manuscript was published in Népsort entitled Kommunikáció a vízilabdában (in English: Communication in water polo) which focused on the communication in water polo. From 1976, he was a lecturer at the ELTE School of English and American Studies. In the late 1970s, he also taught the water polo players of Ferencváros.

Between 1982 and 1983, he taught at the University of California. In 1988, he earned a Doctor of Philosophy degree from the Hungarian Academy of Sciences and a Habilitation degree in 1996. In 1998, he became a Full Professor at ELTE.

He also taught at the University of Nevada, Las Vegas, Rutgers University, Heidelberg University and many others.

To celebrate his 75th birthday, a volume was edited by his colleagues.

In 2014, his edited (co-edited by Frank Polzenhagen, Stefanie Vogelbacher, and Sonja Kleinke) volume entitled Cognitive Explorations into Metaphor and Metonymy was published by Peter Lang.

On 30 June 2018, he gave a plenary speech at the Hong Kong Polytechnic University.

On 6 July 2009, he gave a lecture on "Human universals. The Need for Metaphor." at the Centre de Cultura Contemporània de Barcelona.

On 28 August 2022, he was invited by the Magyar Katolikus Rádió (Hungarian Catholic Radio) to talk about cognitive linguistics.

Kövecses is a member of the Academia Europaea.

== Sports career ==
He started his sports career in Újpest. However, in 1964 he was signed by Újpest's arch-rival Ferencváros. In 1965, he was a member of the national team. Between 1964 and 1978, he was a permanent team member of Ferencváros playing in the Országos Bajnokság I (men's water polo). In 1978, he won the LEN Cup Winners' Cup with Ferencváros. He won a bronze medal at the 1970 Summer Universiade with the national team.

== Major works ==
The following manuscripts are the most cited according to Google Scholar.

- Kövecses, Z. (2010). Metaphor: A practical introduction. Oxford University Press.
- Kövecses, Z. (2005). Metaphor in culture: Universality and variation. Cambridge University Press.
- Kövecses, Z. (2000). Metaphor and emotion: Language, culture, and body in human feeling. Cambridge University Press.
