= Miklós Szenczi =

- Szenczi Miklós
- Born: Miklós Schmidt; 26 April 1904; Budapest, Austria-Hungary
- Died: 11 July 1977 (aged 73); Budapest, Hungary
- Burial place: Farkasréti Cemetery
- Citizenship: Hungarian
- Occupations: academic, literary scholar

Academic background
- Education: University of Aberdeen; Eötvös Loránd University
- Alma mater: Budapest University (Eötvös Loránd University)

Academic work
- Discipline: Literature
- Institutions: Eötvös Loránd University

Miklós Szenczi (26 April 1904, Budapest - 11 July 1977, Budapest) was a Hungarian academic and literary scholar.

== Life ==
He started attending Eötvös Loránd University in 1923 and continued his studies at the University of Aberdeen, in Aberdeen, Scotland. He earned a degree in 1928. In 1933, he earned a Doctor of Philosophy degree from Péter Pázmány Hungarian Royal University. He died in 1977 and he was buried at the Farkasréti Cemetery in Budapest.

== Teaching career ==
He started his teaching career at the Eötvös József College. In 1937, he organised the instruction of the Hungarian language at the University of London, where he was also an instructor of the Hungarian language and literature for more than 10 years.

From 1947, he was an instructor and the director of the Department of English of the Faculty of Humanities of Eötvös Loránd University. In 1949, he was sacked due to political reasons. However, between 1957 and 1967, he was re-appointed as the head of the department and he retired from the department in 1973.

In his final years, he led a research group at the Literary Science department of the Hungarian Academy of Sciences.

== Works ==
Szenczi, M. (1945). British influences on Hungarian literature. Butler and Tanner, Frome.

Szenczi, M. (1945). The fate of the Hungarians in Slovakia. Whitefriars Press, Tonbridge.

Szenczi, M. (1961). Decay and new birth in post-Shakespearian drama. Academia Scientiarum Hungaricae, Budapest.

Szenczi, M. (1965). Shakespeare in recent Soviet criticism.

Szenczi, M., Szobotka, T., & Katona, A. (1972). Az angol irodalom története (The history of the English literature). Gondolat.

Szenczi, M., & Ferenczi, L. (1974). Studies in eighteenth-century literature. Akadémiai Kiadó.
