= Across Languages and Cultures =

Across Languages and Culture
- Discipline: Translation studies
- Language: English
- Edited by: Krisztina Károly

Publication details
- History: 1999-present
- Publisher: Akadémiai Kiadó (Hungary)
- Frequency: Biannually
- Impact factor: 1.292 (2021)

Standard abbreviations
- ISO 4: Across Lang. Cult.

Indexing
- ISSN: 1585-1923 (print); 1588-2519 (web)
- OCLC no.: 60628189

Links
- Journal homepage

Across Languages and Cultures is a biannual peer-reviewed academic journal published by Akadémiai Kiadó (Budapest, Hungary). It publishes original articles and book reviews on all subdisciplines of translation and interpreting studies. The journal was established in 1999. The founding editor-in-chief is Kinga Klaudy (Eötvös Loránd University). The present editor-in-chief is Krisztina Károly (Eötvös Loránd University).

== Abstracting and indexing ==
The journal is abstracted and indexed in the Social Sciences Citation Index, the Arts and Humanities Citation Index, and Scopus. According to the Journal Citation Reports, the journal has a 2021 impact factor of 1.292, ranking it 98th out of 194 journals in the category "Linguistics".
