= Tibor Lutter =

- Lutter Tibor
- Born: 15 August 1910; Budapest, Austria-Hungary
- Died: 9 June 1960 (aged 49); Budapest, Hungary
- Burial place: Farkasréti Cemetery
- Citizenship: Hungarian
- Occupation: academic,

Academic background
- Education: University of Aberdeen; Eötvös Loránd University
- Alma mater: Budapest University (Eötvös Loránd University)

Academic work
- Discipline: Literature
- Institutions: Eötvös Loránd University

Tibor Lutter (15 August 1910, Budapest - 9 June 1960, Budapest) was a Hungarian academic and literary scholar.

== Life ==
His parents were János Lutter and Irma Aczél. He started his education in the Jesuit Gymnasium (today: Szent István Gymnasium) in Kalocsa and finished his secondary studies at the II. District Real Gymnasium in Budapest. In 1933, he earned an English-French-Hungarian teacher degree from the Eötvös Loránd University. In 1936, he also earned a Doctor of Philosophy degree in English language at the Eötvös Loránd University.

== Teaching career ==
Between 1933 and 1946, he taught at the IX. District Trade School. Between 1943 and 1944, he also taught at the Deutsche Reichschule in Budapest. Between 1944 and 1945, he also took part in the opposition of the Occupation of Hungary by Nazi Germany.

Between 1946 and 1948, he was a teacher at the University of Szeged. Between 1948 and 1950, he was the director of the Eötvös József College. Between 1946 and 1948, he was a private teacher at the University of Debrecen.

Between 1949 and 1952, he was an instructor at the Department of English of the Faculty of Humanities of Eötvös Loránd University. Between 1949 and 1956, he was an associate professor and a director of the Department of English Language and Literature of the Eötvös Loránd University.

== Works ==
- Lutter, T. (1952). G. B. Shaw. Nep Könyvkiadó, Budapest.
- Lutter, T. (1956). John Milton, az angol polgári forradalom költöje. Akadémiai Kiadó, Budapest.
- Lutter, T. (1959). James Joyce. Gondolat, Budapest.
- András, L.T., Lutter, T., Róna, É., & Károlyné, S. (1963). Rendszeres angol nyelvtan. Tankönyvkiadó Vállalat, Budapest.
