= Krisztina Károly =

Hungarian linguist and full professor (born 1969)

- Born: Károly Krisztina; September 2, 1969; Pécs
- Citizenship: Hungarian
- Education: Eötvös Loránd University
- Children: 1
- Scientific career
- Fields: Discourse analysis and translation studies
- Workplaces: Eötvös Loránd University
- Theses: Lexical repetition in text (2002); Szövegkoherencia a fordításban [Discourse coherence in translation] (2015)

Krisztina Károly (born 2 September 1969) is a Hungarian linguist, full professor of linguistics at Eötvös Loránd University and doctor of the Hungarian Academy of Sciences (2016). Her fields of research are discourse analysis and translation studies. She is head of the Doctoral School of Linguistics at the Faculty of Humanities of Eötvös Loránd University, head of the PhD Programme in Language Pedagogy and English Applied Linguistics, and chair of the Department of English Language Pedagogy at the School of English and American Studies.

== Early life and education ==
She graduated from Nagy Lajos Secondary Grammar School in Pécs in 1988. She earned a combined master’s degree in teaching English and Spanish Language and Literature at the Faculty of Humanities of Eötvös Loránd University in 1993. She obtained her PhD degree in English Linguistics (1999) and her habilitation degree (2007) at the Doctoral School of Linguistics, ELTE. In 2016, she was awarded the title of Doctor of the Hungarian Academy of Sciences (DSc). She has been working at the School of English and American Studies of ELTE since 1993, since 2017 as full professor of linguistics.

Her father, Róbert Károly was a composer, conductor, college department chair, and university tutor. Her mother, Csilla Vezekényi was a piano teacher and music educator. Her husband is Péter Kiszl, university professor and librarian. Her daughter, Dorottya earned a master’s degree in international studies in 2025.

== Career ==
Since earning her university degree in 1993, she has been teaching at the School of English and American Studies at ELTE’s Faculty of Humanities, first at the Department of English Applied Linguistics and later at the Department of English Language Pedagogy, where she has been serving as department chair since 2014. In 2000, she led the working group at the Ministry of Foreign Affairs of the Republic of Hungary responsible for designing the Special Language Examination in Diplomacy; the examination was accredited by the Language Examination Accreditation Centre for English, French, German, Italian, Russian, and Spanish. From 2007 to 2010, she served as Deputy Director responsible for Academic Affairs at the School of English and American Studies of ELTE; from 2010 to 2013, she was Vice Dean responsible for Education and Studies Affairs at the Faculty of Humanities; from 2013 to 2018, she served as the founding Director General of ELTE’s Teacher Training Centre, and from 2018 to 2021, she served as Vice Dean responsible for International Affairs at the Faculty of Humanities. As Vice Dean of the Faculty of Humanities, she participated in the work of the CHARM-EU university consortium under the European Universities initiative, where in 2020 she represented ELTE in Work Package 7 (Pilot).

Previously, she served as head (2005–2009, 2013–2019) and core member (2009–2019) of the PhD Programme in Language Pedagogy at ELTE’s Doctoral School of Education. Since 2020, she has been a core member of ELTE’s Doctoral School of Linguistics and the founding head of the PhD Programme in Language Pedagogy and English Applied Linguistics at the Faculty of Humanities. From 2021 to 2024, she served as deputy head of the Doctoral School of Linguistics and has been working as its head since 2024. Since 2004, she has also been a founding faculty member and supervisor of the PhD Programme in Translation Studies at the Doctoral School of Linguistics.

She is a voting member of the Linguistics Committee of the Hungarian Academy of Sciences’ Section I for Linguistics and Literary Studies, and served as chair of the Hungarian Academy of Sciences’ Working Committee on Applied Linguistics from 2021 to 2024. From 2018 to 2024, she served as a Board member and as a member of the University Professors’ College of the Hungarian Higher Education Accreditation Committee, and as the chair of its Committee for the Humanities; from 2014 to 2017, she was a member of the Teacher Training Committee. She has served as vice president (since 2018) and a member of the board (since 2008) of the Hungarian Association of Applied Linguists and Language Teachers. She is a member of the European Society for Translation Studies and the Hungarian Society for Linguistics; she used to be a member of the Teacher Training Committee of the Hungarian Rectors’ Conference (2014–2018) and of the Supervisory Board of the Tempus Public Foundation (2014–2019).

For several years, she has served as a member or chair of numerous ELTE university bodies, including the ELTE Senate, the Faculty Council of the Faculty of Humanities and the Scientific Committee of the Faculty. She is a member of ELTE’s University Doctoral Council (2024‒), the Faculty Habilitation Committee (2021‒), the Faculty Awards Committee (2024–), and the Faculty Council of Professors (2017–); she is chair of the Doctoral Council of the Faculty of Humanities (2024–), chair of the Council of the Doctoral School of Linguistics (2024–) and member of the School Council of the School of English and American Studies. From 2015 to 2019, she served as an external member with voting rights on the Habilitation Committee and the Doctoral Council of the Doctoral School of Multilingual Linguistics at the University of Pannonia.

She plays an active role in founding and editing academic journals. She used to be co-founder and co-editor (2000–2024) of, and more recently has been editor-in-chief (2025–) of Across Languages and Cultures (Akadémiai Kiadó), a Q1 peer-reviewed and indexed international journal. In 2025, she served as an associate editor of the D1-ranked International Journal of Applied Linguistics (Wiley). She was founding editor with Dorottya Holló of the peer-reviewed online journal Working Papers in Language Pedagogy‒WoPaLP (published by the School of English and American Studies, ELTE) (2014‒2019). She is a member of the editorial board of the Hungarian journals Fordítástudomány and Alkalmazott Nyelvtudomány, and a member of the advisory board of the journal Modern Nyelvoktatás. She is a member of the Advisory Board of Benjamins Translation Library, the prestigious English-language book series in translation studies, published by John Benjamins.

== Research ==
Since 1993, she has been engaged in the study of foreign language and translation-related discourse production. In the field of foreign language (English) discourse production, she has examined the text-organizing role of lexical repetition. Her quantitative and qualitative corpus analyses confirmed three key findings: if the notion of lexical repetition is used in a broad sense (to include not only verbatim repetition but also the repeated mentions of discourse entities via other linguistic means), then lexical cohesion can be interpreted as various forms of lexical repetition; the patterns (networks) lexical repetitions form in discourse may serve distinct text-organizing functions; based on the networks lexical repetitions form, it is possible to measure certain subjective intuitions related to text quality in an objective manner (i.e., based on linguistic elements identifiable on the textual surface).

At the intersection of the science of text and translation, one of the key outcomes of her research is the creation of the Complex Translational Discourse Analysis Model, which identifies and describes the shifts in coherence that occur during translation between Hungarian and English and maps out the consequences these shifts entail in text structure generally, and in the text’s global semantic structure specifically (as well as ultimately in text meaning). She tested the analytical model on English translations of Hungarian news articles and, with its help, defined the concept of “discourse-level translation strategies” and proposed a taxonomy of such strategies. She identified four main groups of discourse-level translation strategies: strategies related to cohesive structure, macropropositional structure, topical structure, and rhetorical structure.

Another area of her translation-oriented research relates to academic translation. The significance of her work lies in that the translation of scientific knowledge is not merely a philological task, because it influences scientific communication and thinking, and through these, it affects culture, society, as well as science at large. She argues that the translation strategy (localization or foreignization) chosen by the translator (be it the scholar, the trained translator, or the machine) has an impact on the sustainability of the epistemological diversity of humankind. She has presented the results of her analyses at the conference entitled “Mit tehet nyelvünk a magyar tudományért?”, organized as part of the programme series marking the 200th anniversary of the founding of the Hungarian Academy of Sciences. She discussed the potential epistemological consequences of the translation strategies selected in the areas of knowledge creation, information transfer between knowledge systems, and the preservation of various kinds of knowledge. Her Academic Translation Competence Model designed to aid the training of translators and scholars engaged in academic translation outlines the discipline-specific, epistemic, as well as general and specialized translation competencies that enable the translator to make epistemologically responsible and informed decisions while producing a target language text that is functionally equivalent to the source text and fits into the disciplinary praxis of the target culture. She argues for the significance of the preservation of academic multilingualism and epistemological diversity, as opposed to academic monolingualism based on the exclusive use of a lingua franca.

Her research has received regular funding: from Országos Tudományos Kutatási Alap ‒ OTKA (the Hungarian Scientific Research Fund, 1998–2001, 2002, 2003–2008, 2004–2008, 2011–2014), the Pro Renovanda Cultura Hungariae Foundation’s “In Memory of Kuno Klebelsberg” Special Fund (2001), the World-Language Programme: Language+Profession at the Secondary Level Grant (2006), the EU’s Comenius Programme (2008–2010), the TMB (Tudományos Minősítő Bizottság / Scientific Qualification Committee) Scholarship of the Hungarian Academy of Sciences (1993–1995), János Bolyai Research Fellowship (2010–2013), TÁMOP-„Országos koordinációval a pedagógusképzés megújításáért” (2014–2015), EFOP-„Nyelvtanulással a boldogulásért” (2017–2018).

She has shared the results of her research in a number of countries (in the United States, Australia, Austria, Belgium, the Czech Republic, the United Kingdom, France, China, Poland, Germany, Russia, Portugal, Serbia, Slovakia, Slovenia, Thailand, Turkey) and in Hungary, too. She has over 130 scientific publications. She has organized more than 30 national and international conferences in Hungary and in other countries of the world.

== Awards and honors ==
- Bolyai Certificate of Merit awarded by the Board of Trustees of the Hungarian Academy of Sciences’ János Bolyai Research Scholarship (2014)
- Rector’s Special Award for Excellence, ELTE (2016)
- Faculty Award for Publication Excellence, Faculty of Humanities, ELTE (2021, 2024)
- “Pro Universitate” Memorial Medal, Gold Degree awarded by ELTE’s Senate (2021)
- Pro Facultate Philosophiae Award of the Faculty Council of the Faculty of Humanities, ELTE (2024)
- ELTE University Excellence Fund, Prestigious Research Publication Prize (2025)
- Sámuel Brassai Award of the Hungarian Association of Applied Linguists and Language Teachers (2025)

== Selected publications ==
=== Monographs ===
- Károly K. (2002). Lexical repetition in text. Peter Lang.
- Károly K. (2007/2018). Szövegtan és fordítás [Text linguistics and translation]. Akadémiai Kiadó.
- Károly K. (2011). Szöveg, koherencia, kohézió. Szövegtipológiai és retorikai tanulmányok [Text, coherence, cohesion. Studies on text typology and rhetoric]. Tinta Könyvkiadó.
- Károly K. (2014). Szövegkoherencia a fordításban [Discourse coherence in translation]. ELTE Eötvös Kiadó.
- Károly K. (2017). Aspects of cohesion and coherence in translation. The case of Hungarian-English news translation. John Benjamins.

=== Research articles and book chapters ===
- Klaudy K. & Károly K. (2000). The text-organizing function of lexical repetition in translation. In M. Olohan (ed.), Intercultural faultlines. Research models in translation studies 1. Textual and linguistic aspects (pp. 143‒159). St. Jerome.
- Klaudy K. & Károly K. (2002). Lexical repetition in professional and trainees’ translation. In E. Hung (ed.), Teaching translation and interpreting, 4, Benjamins Translation Library, Vol. 42 (pp. 99‒113). John Benjamins.
- Klaudy K. & Károly K. (2005). Implicitation in translation: Empirical evidence for operational asymmetry in translation. Across Languages and Cultures, 6(1), 13‒28.
- Károly K. (2010). Shifts in repetition vs. shifts in text meaning: A study of the textual role of lexical repetition in non-literary translation. Target, 22(1), 40‒70.
- Károly K. (2013). Translating rhetoric: Relational propositional shifts in the Hungarian-English translations of news stories. The Translator, 19(2), 245‒273.
- Károly K. (2013). News discourse in translation: Topical structure and news content in the analytical news article. META, 57(4), 884‒908.
- Károly K. (2013). Rhetoric in translation. Research methods for a genre-oriented analysis of rhetorical structure in Hungarian—English news translation. Sprachtheorie und germanistische Linguistik, 23(2), 175‒202.
- Károly K. (2014). Referential cohesion and news content: a case study of shifts of reference in Hungarian—English news translation. Target, 26(3), 406‒431.
- Károly K. (2017). Logical relations in translation: the case of Hungarian-English news translation. Perspectives: Studies in Translatology, 25(2), 273‒293.
- Károly K. (2018). Media and translation: adapting traditional concepts to news-centered multimedia. In C. Cotter & D. Perrin (eds.), The Routledge handbook of language and media (pp. 388‒402). Routledge.
- Károly K. (2021). Láthatatlan fordítás? A tudományos szakfordítás empirikus kutatásának eredményeiről funkcionális megközelítésben. Fordítástudomány, 23(1), 21‒48.
- Károly K. (2022). A tudományos szakfordításról fordítástudományi megközelítésben. Magyar Tudomány, 183(3), 359‒367. https://doi.org/10.1556/2065.183.2022.3.10
- Károly K. (2022). Translating academic texts. In K. Malmkjær (ed.), The Cambridge handbook of translation (pp. 340‒362). Cambridge University Press.
- Károly K. (2022). A nyelvi közvetítés empirikus kutatásának módszerei. In Klaudy K., Robin E. & Seidl Péch O. (szerk.), Bevezetés a fordítás és a tolmácsolás kutatásának módszertanába I. Általános rész (pp. 27‒58). ELTE FTT–MANYE Fordítástudományi Szakosztály. https://doi.org/10.21862/kutmodszertan1
- Károly K. (2024). Research methods in the study of linguistic mediation. Alkalmazott Nyelvtudomány, 2024(3), 15–43. http://dx.doi.org/10.18460/ANY.K.2024.3.002
- Károly K. (2024). A fordítás mint szöveg(re)produkció kutatásának elméletei és módszerei. In Klaudy K., Robin E. & Seidl Péch O. (szerk.), Bevezetés a fordítás és a tolmácsolás kutatásának módszertanába II. Speciális rész (pp. 11‒30). ELTE FTT–MANYE Fordítástudományi Szakosztály. https://doi.org/10.21862/kutmodszertan2
- Károly K. (2025). Tudományos többnyelvűség és fordítás: fordítási kompetenciák, stratégiák és episztemológiai kihívások. Magyar Tudomány, 186(2), 303‒312. https://doi.org/10.1556/2065.186.2025.2.10
- Károly K. (2026). Towards a conceptual model of academic translation competence. International Journal of Applied Linguistics, 36(1), 175–195. http://dx.doi.org/10.1111/ijal.12644
- Károly K. (2026). Tudományfordítás: episztemológiai kérdések, kutatási módszerek és eredmények. In Klaudy K., Robin E. & Seidl Péch O. (szerk.), Bevezetés a fordítás és a tolmácsolás kutatásának módszertanába III. Speciális rész 2 (pp. 11‒39). ELTE FTT–MANYE Fordítástudományi Szakosztály.
- Károly K. (2026). Magyar nyelv és tudomány. A retorikai szerkezet és a paradigmatikus megközelítések tudásformáló sajátosságairól a fordítástudományban. In Dávidházi P. & Kertész A. (szerk.), Mit tehet nyelvünk a tudományért?. A humán tudományok alapkérdései c. sorozat. Gondolat Kiadó.

=== Edited volumes ===
- Károly K. & Fóris Á. (szerk.). (2005). New trends in translation studies. Akadémiai Kiadó. 218 pp
- Károly K. & Fóris Á. (szerk.). (2010). Nyelvek találkozása a fordításban. Doktori kutatások Klaudy Kinga tiszteletére. ELTE Eötvös Kiadó. 300 pp.
- Frank T. & Károly K. (szerk.). (2010). Gateways to English. Current doctoral research. ELTE Eötvös Kiadó. 376 pp.
- Csizér K., Holló D. & Károly K. (szerk.). (2011). Dinamikus csoport - dinamikus tanulás: A csoportdinamika szerepe a nyelvtanulásban. Tinta Könyvkiadó. 280 pp.
- Frank T. & Károly K. (szerk.). (2012). 125 éves a budapesti angol szak. Doktorandusz tanulmányok. Talentum Sorozat, 16. kötet. ELTE Eötvös Kiadó. 160 pp.
- Frank T. & Károly K. (szerk.). (2013). Az angol tudománya. 125 éves az angol szak az Eötvös Loránd Tudományegyetemen. ELTE Eötvös Kiadó. 360 pp.
- Holló D. & Károly K. (szerk.). (2015). Inspirations in foreign language teaching – Studies in applied linguistics, language pedagogy and language teaching in honour of Péter Medgyes. Pearson Education. 298 pp.
- Károly K. & Perjés I. (szerk.). (2015). Diszciplínák tanítása – a tanítás diszciplínái 2. Tanulmányok a tanárképzés tudományos műhelyeiből. ELTE Eötvös Kiadó. 359 pp.
- Károly K. & Perjés I. (szerk.). (2015). Diszciplínák tanítása – a tanítás diszciplínái 1. Jó gyakorlatok a tudós tanárképzés műhelyeiből. ELTE Eötvös Kiadó. 327 pp.
- Károly K. & Fóris Á. (szerk.). (2015). A fordítás titkos ösvényein. Doktori kutatások Klaudy Kinga tiszteletére II. ELTE Eötvös Kiadó. 341 pp.
- Károly K. & Homonnay Z. (szerk.). (2016). Diszciplínák tanítása – a tanítás diszciplínái 3. Kutatások és jó gyakorlatok a tanárképzés tudós műhelyeiből. ELTE Eötvös Kiadó. 239 pp.
- Károly K. & Homonnay Z. (szerk.). (2017). Diszciplínák tanítása – a tanítás diszciplínái 5. Mérési és értékelési módszerek az oktatásban és a pedagógusképzésben. ELTE Eötvös Kiadó. 323 pp.
- Károly K. & Homonnay Z. (szerk.). (2017). Diszciplínák tanítása – a tanítás diszciplínái 4. A tanulás és a tanítás értékelése. ELTE Eötvös Kiadó. 356 pp.
- Károly, K., Lázár, I. & Gall, C. (szerk.). (2020). Culture and intercultural communication. Research and education.: ELTE BTK Angol-Amerikai Intézet. 238 pp.
- Holló D. & Károly K. (szerk.) (2025). From mirrors and windows to bridges in intercultural competence development. ELTE Eötvös Kiadó. 243 pp.
