= Gábor Kósa =

Hungarian professor

- Born: 31 January 1971 (age 55); Budapest, Hungary
- Occupations: Historian of Religion, Sinologist

Education
- Education: Eötvös Lóránd University (M.A., Ph.D., Dr. habil.); Zsigmond Király Főiskola (M.A.)
- Website: https://www.btk.elte.hu/en/staff/gabor-kosa

Gábor Kósa (born 31 January 1971) is a Hungarian historian of religions, a professor at the Faculty of Humanities of the Eötvös Loránd University, Department of Chinese Studies, (Chinese name: Kāng Gāobǎo; Traditional Chinese: 康高寶; Simplified Chinese: 康高宝.) and is also a member of the Academia Europaea.

== Career ==
Born in Budapest, Gábor Kósa holds MA degrees in English (1995) from the School of English and American Studies of the Faculty of Humanities of the ELTE, Chinese (1997) and religious studies (2011). In 2006 he defended his doctoral dissertation entitled ʻThe Terminological Analysis of Chinese Texts Related to Manichaeism’ (in Hungarian: A manicheizmussal kapcsolatos kínai nyelvű szövegek terminológiai elemzése).

Between 1999 and 2008, he was teaching at the Dharma Gate Buddhist College. He has been working at Eötvös Loránd University from 2009 to 2024 as an associate professor, and then from 2024 as a professor.

Kósa was awarded the postdoctoral scholarship of the Japan Society for the Promotion of Science (JSPS, 2008–2009) and the Taiwanese Chiang Ching-kuo Foundation for International Scholarly Exchange (2010–2012). In 2014–15, he was an EURIAS fellow at Centre for Research in the Arts, Social Sciences and Humanities (CRASSH), Cambridge University. In 2020–21, he was Roger E. Covey Member in East Asian studies at the Institute of Advanced Study (IAS, Princeton).

He is member of the Silk Road Research Group at ELTE University, he is partner investigator in the Australian Research Council Project titled „Manichaean Liturgical Texts and Practices from Egypt to China". He is one of the editors of the Hungarian journal entitled Távol-keleti Tanulmányok (East Asian Studies). From 2019 he serves as the editor-in-chief of the Acta Orientalia Academiae Scientiarum Hungaricae. He is member of the Committee on Oriental Studies at the Hungarian Academy of Sciences.

His main research field includes Chinese mythology, ancient Chinese shamanistic (wu) practices, and Chinese Manichaeism.

== Notable publications ==
in Hungarian:

- „A manicheizmus Kínában.” In: Hamar Imre (szerk.) 2000. Mítoszok és vallások Kínában. [Sinológiai Műhely 1.] Budapest: Balassi Kiadó, 90–122.
- „Sámánizmus és mitológia az ókori Chu államban.” In: Puskás Ildikó (szerk.) 2000. Állandóság a változásban. T'ung-pien. Tőkei Ferenc születésnapjára. Budapest: Politika + Kultúra Alapítvány, 398–428.
- „Matuzsálem a Jangce partján.” In: Birtalan Ágnes – Yamaji Masanori (szerk.) 2001. Orientalista Nap 2000. Budapest: MTA Orientalisztikai Bizottság – ELTE Orientalisztikai Intézet, 78–95.
- „Exorcizmus és sámánizmus az ókori Kínában.” In: Csonka-Takács Eszter – Czövek Judit – Takács András (szerk.) 2002. Mir-susnē-khum. Tanulmánykötet Hoppál Mihály tiszteletére. Budapest: Akadémiai Kiadó. 2. kötet, 806–833.
- „A mágikus, a szellemi és a varázslatos. A ling szó jelentésének vizsgálata a Jiuge versciklus alapján.” In: Hamar Imre – Salát Gergely (szerk.) 2003. Kínai nyelv és irodalom.Tanulmányok Csongor Barnabás születésének 80. évfordulójára. [Sinológiai Műhely 4.] Budapest: Balassi Kiadó, 38–65.
- „Halandó halhatatlanok. A xian-halhatatlanság képzete a Baopuzi 2. fejezetének tükrében.” In: Hamar Imre – Salát Gergely (szerk.) 2004. Kínai filozófia és vallás a középkor hajnalán. Budapest: Balassi Kiadó, 77–136.
- „Sámánizmus a Tang-kor előtti Kínában.” In: Hoppál Mihály – Szathmári Botond – Takács András (szerk.) 2006. Sámánok és kultúrák. Budapest: Gondolat Kiadó, 296–360.
- „Creatio ex gigante – a kínai Pangu-mítosz forrásai.” Vallástudományi Szemle 2007/2: 142–174.
- „A létezők átváltozása” –– A pillangó motívuma a Zhuangziben.” Vallástudományi Szemle 2008/1: 91–106.
- „Az öröklét gyümölcsei” − Kínai nyelvű manicheus töredékek a Turfán-medencéből.” Távol-keleti Tanulmányok 2009/1: 49–68.
- „A Hatalmas Felhő Fényessége” – áttekintés a kínai buddhizmus és manicheizmus viszonyáról a történeti források tükrében. (Buddho-Manichaica III).” In: Hamar I. – Salát Gergely (szerk.) 2009. Kínai történelem és kultúra – Tanulmányok Ecsedy Ildikó emlékére. (Sinológiai Műhely 7.) Budapest: Balassi Kiadó, 115–135.

in English:

- “In Search of the Spirits. Shamanism in China before the Tang dynasty. Part I.” Shaman (Journal of the International Society for Shamanistic Research) 8.2. (2000) 131–179.
- “Open Wide, Oh, Heaven's Door! Shamanism in China before the Tang dynasty. Part II.” Shaman (Journal of the International Society for Shamanistic Research) 9.2. (2001) 169–197.
- “The Shaman and the Spirits. The Meaning of the Word ‘ling’ in the Jiuge poems.” Acta Orientalia Hung. 56.2–4. (2003) 275–294.
- “Pangu’s Birth and Death as Recorded in a Tang Dynasty Buddhist Source.” Archiv Orientální / Oriental Archive: Quarterly Journal of African and Asian Studies 77.2. (2009) 169–192.
- “Peacocks under the Jewel-tree − New hypotheses on the Manichaean painting of Bezeklik (Cave 38).” Journal of Inner Asian Art and Archaeology 4 (2011) 135–148.
- “The ‘Sea of Fire’ as a Chinese Manichaean metaphor — Source materials for mapping an unnoticed image.” Asia Major 24.2 (2011) 1–52.
- “The protagonist-catalogues of the apocryphal Acts of Apostles in the Coptic Manichaica –– a re-assessment of the evidence.” In: Bechtold E. and Gulyás A. and Hasznos A. (eds.) 2011. From Illahun to Djeme. Papers Presented in Honour of Ulrich Luft. Oxford: Archaeopress, 107–119.
- “Buddhist and pseudo-Buddhist motifs in the Chinese Manichaean Hymnscroll.” In: Bellér-Hann, Ildikó and Rajkai Zsombor (eds.) 2012. Frontiers and boundaries –– Encounters on China’s margins. Wiesbaden: Harrassowitz, 49–69.
- “Atlas and Splenditenens in the Cosmology Painting.” In: Michael Knüppel und Luigi Cirillo (eds.) 2012. Gnostica et Manichaica. Festschrift für Aloïs van Tongerloo. Anläßlich des 60. Geburtstages überreicht von Kollegen, Freunden und Schülern. (Studies in Oriental Religions 65.) Wiesbaden: Harrassowitz, 63–88.
- “Translating the Eikōn. Some considerations on the relation of the Chinese Cosmology painting to the Eikōn.” In: Laut, Jens Peter / Röhrborn, Klaus (Hrsg.) 2014. Vom Aramäischen zum Alttürkischen. Fragen zur Übersetzung von manichäischen Texten. Vorträge des Göttinger Symposium vom 29./30. September 2011. Berlin, New York: De Gruyter (Abhandlungen der Akademie der Wissenschaften zu Göttingen, N. F.), 49–84.
- “Buddhist Monsters in the Chinese Manichaean Hymnscroll and the Pumen chapter of the Lotus sūtra.” The Eastern Buddhist 44 (2014) 27–76.
- “The Iconographical Affiliation and the Religious Message of the Judgment Scene in the Chinese Cosmology Painting.” In: Zhang Xiaogui 张小贵 (chief editor)，Wang Yuanyuan 王媛媛 and Yin Xiaoping 殷小平 (eds.) 2015. San yi jiao yanjiu –– Lin Wushu jiaoshou guxi jinian wenji 三夷教研究——林悟殊教授古稀纪念文集 (Researches on the Three Foreign Religions ––Papers in Honour for Prof. Lin Wushu on His 70th Birthday.) Lanzhou: Lanzhou Daxue Chubanshe (Ou-Ya lishi wenhua wenku 欧亚历史文化文库》[Treasures of Eurasian History and Culture]), 77–161.
- "The Manichaean ‘New Paradise’ in Text and Image." Crossroads 13 (2016) 27–113.
- "Near Eastern Angels in Chinese Manichaean Texts." Orientierungen / Zeitschrift zur Kultur Asiens 30 (2018 [2019]) 43–71.
- "The Qing Corpus of Manichaean Texts from Fujian." Ming Qing Studies 2020: 85–126.
- "Zarathuštra in the Chinese Manichaean Manuscripts from Fujian." Quaderni di Studi Indo-Mediterranei XII (2019 [2021]): 135–171.

In Chinese:

- "Monijiao shenpan huihua er zhen 摩尼教审判绘画二帧 [Two Manichaean Judgment Scenes]." [Trans. You Xiaoyu] Zhongshan Daxue Xuebao (Shehui kexue ban) 中山大学学报(社会科学版) 61/4 (2021): 120–130.
- "ʻXiabuzan’ yiti tanmi –– Fujian Monijiao wenshu zhong de Xiabuzan yinwen bianxi 《下部赞》异本探秘–––福建摩尼教文书中的《下部赞》引文辨析 [Another Hymnscroll? Some Hymnal Quotations in the Manichaean Corpus from Fujian]." (Trans. Ma Xiaohe 马小鹤) Shaoxing Wenli Xueyuan xuebao 绍兴文理学院学报 41/9: 1–12.

In Japanese:

- “Uchū-zu no ‘Kōki no hojisha’ ni tsuite 宇宙図の「光輝の保持者」について [Splenditenens in the Cosmology painting]." (Trans. Dr. Inoue Takami) In: Yoshida Yutaka 吉田豊 and Furukawa Shōichi 古川 攝一 (eds.) 2015. Chūgoku kōnan Manikyō kaiga kenkyū 中国江南マニ教絵画研究 [Studies of the Chinese Manichaean paintings of South Chinese origin preserved in Japan]. Kyoto: Rinsen, 292‒302.
- “Uchū-zu no Atorasu ni tsuite 宇宙図のアトラスについて [Atlas in the Cosmology painting]." (Trans. Dr. Inoue Takami) In: Yoshida Yutaka 吉田豊 and Furukawa Shōichi 古川 攝一 (eds.) 2015. Chūgoku kōnan Manikyō kaiga kenkyū 中国江南マニ教絵画研究 [Studies of the Chinese Manichaean paintings of South Chinese origin preserved in Japan]. Kyoto: Rinsen, 261‒274.
- “Chūgoku no Manikyō uchū-zu ni egakareta sabaki no bamen: zuzō no kigen to shūkyō-tekina messēji 中国のマニ教宇宙図に描かれた裁きの場面: 図像の起源と宗 教的なメッセージ.” [The Judgment Scene in the Chinese Manichaean Cosmology Painting and its Religious Message]." (Trans. Ikematsu-Papp Gabriella 池松パプガブリエラ and Ikematsu Hiroshi 池松 裕史) In: Yoshida Yutaka 吉田豊 and Furukawa Shōichi 古川 攝一 (eds.) 2015. Chūgoku kōnan Manikyō kaiga kenkyū 中国江南マニ教絵画研究 [Studies of the Chinese Manichaean paintings of South Chinese origin preserved in Japan]. Kyoto: Rinsen, 275‒291.
