= Arthur Yolland =

English literary historian (1874–1956)

Arthur Battishill Yolland
- Born: 24 August 1874; Hoylake, Merseyside, England
- Died: 12 November 1956 (aged 82); Budapest, Hungary
- Occupations: academic, referee

Academic background
- Education: Rossal School; University of Cambridge; Budapest University (Eötvös Loránd University)

Arthur Battishill Yolland (24 August 1874, Hoylake - 12 November 1956, Budapest) was an English literary scholar, tennis coach, footballer and international referee.

== Life ==
His parents were John Yolland and Emma Pace. He was born in Hoylake, Merseyside, England on 24 August 1874. He attended Rossall School, Fleetwood, Lancashire between 1888 and 1893. He continued his studies at the University of Cambridge and in 1896 he earned a Bachelor's degree. In the same year, he was invited by Mihály Demeczky to become an English teacher at the József Ferenc Institute.

In 1898, he became a lecturer at the Budapest University. In 1914, he was appointed as the head of the Department of English. Between 1945 and 1947, he became the head of department once again.

In 1905, he obtained a Doctor of Philosophy degree at the Budapest University.

== Referee career ==
On 11 June 1903, he was appointed as the referee for the match between Hungary national football team and Austria national football team. The match was played at Margitsziget stadion in Budapest and ended with a 3-2 home win in front of 700 spectators.

== Major works in English language ==
He wrote more than 74 works during his lifetime.

- Yolland, A.B. (1906). Shakespeare or Bacon? Budapest
- Yolland, A.B. (1907). The Constitutional Struggle of the Magyars. London.
- Yolland, A.B. (1908). The National Spirit in Hungarian Literature. Cambridge, (Modern History. Vol. XI.)
- Yolland, A.B. (1908). The Queen Elisabeth Memorial Museum. Ford. Budapest.
- Yolland, A.B. (1908). Education in Hungary. Budapest.
- Yolland, A.B. (1917). Hungary. London
