= Péter Medgyes =

- Medgyes Péter
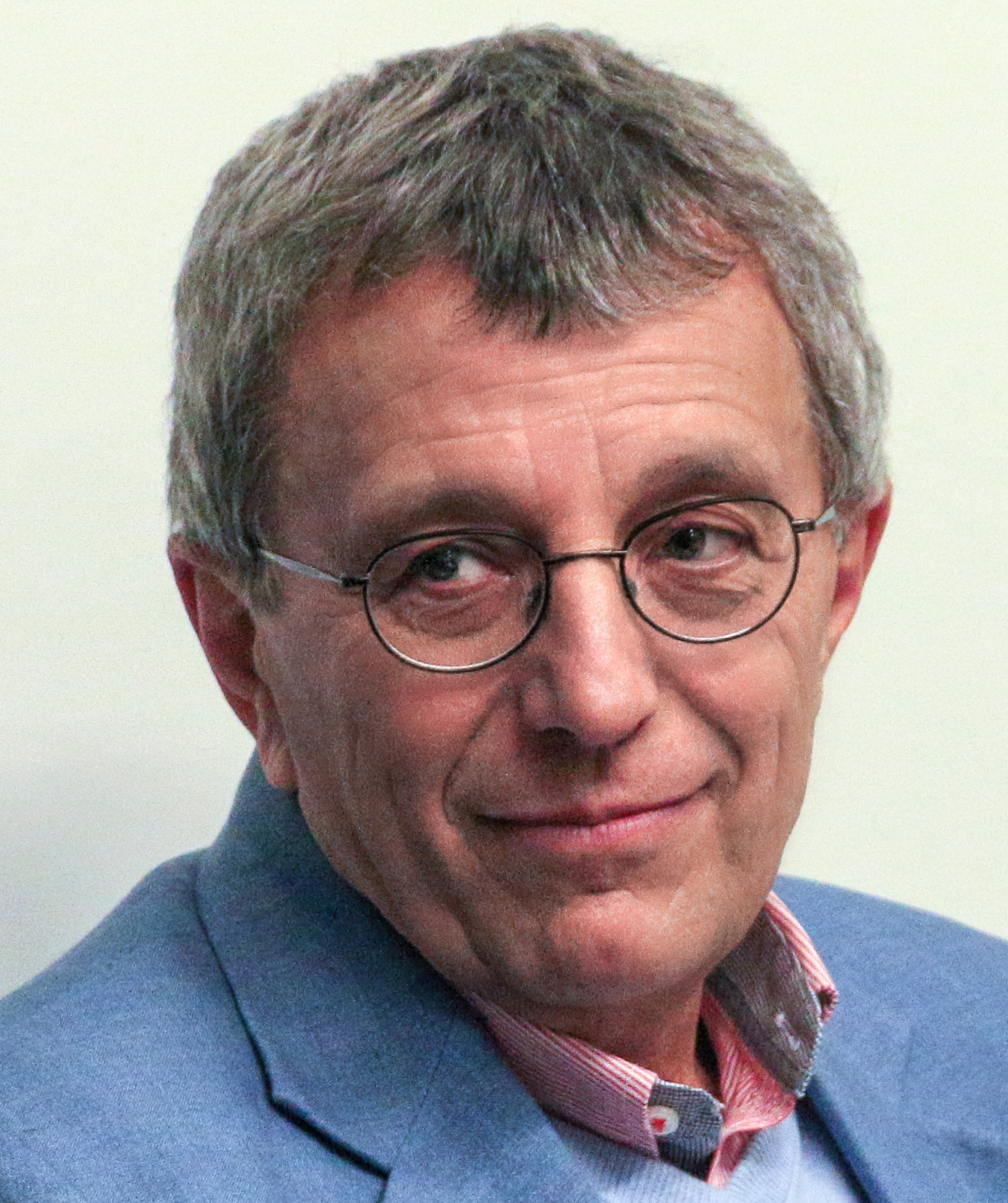
- Born: 6 August 1945 (age 81); Budapest, Hungary
- Citizenship: Hungarian
- Occupations: linguist, academic, diplomat
- Spouse: Valéria Árva
- Children: Réka (1971); Kata (1975); Bálint (2001)
- Awards: Duke of Edinburgh English Language Book Competition (1995)

Academic background
- Education: Eötvös Loránd University
- Alma mater: Budapest University (Eötvös Loránd University)

Academic work
- Discipline: Applied linguistics, Language education
- Institutions: Eötvös Loránd University

Péter Medgyes (6 August 1945, Budapest) is a professor emeritus at the School of English and American Studies of the Faculty of Humanities of Eötvös Loránd University.

== Career ==
After obtaining an English-Russian teacher degree from Eötvös Loránd University, he started teaching in one of the ELTE's practice school, Radnóti Miklós Secondary School in Budapest. After teaching 15 years at secondary level, he received a position at the Department of English of the Eötvös Loránd University.

After the end of communism in Hungary, he established the Centre for English Teacher Training (CETT) at the ELTE. He was also the director of the CETT.

After earning a Doctor of Philosophy degree in language pedagogy, he became a university professor. Since 2013, he has been an Emeritus at the ELTE.

He has written 42 books that were published in Hungary, the United Kingdom, and the United States. In 1991, his book entitled 'When in Britain', co-written with Rob Nolasco, was published by Oxford University Press. One of his most successful book, entitled 'The non-native teacher' was published in 1994 by Macmillan Publishers. In 2003, his book entitled 'Laughing matters: Humour in the language classroom' was published by Cambridge University Press.

He was also the chief editor of the Hungarian journal entitled Modern Nyelvoktatás (in English: Modern Language Teaching).

He founded the International Association of Teachers of English as a Foreign Language-Hungary in 1990 and he has been the patron of the organisation for many years.

== Political career ==
He was the Ambassador of Hungary in Damascus, Syria between 2005 and 2009.

== Major works ==
- Linda and the Greenies; Tankönyvkiadó, Bp., 1984
- Medgyes Péter–Helen Thomas: Osztály, vigyázz! Iskolai kifejezések gyűjteménye angol és magyar nyelven; Tankönyvkiadó, Bp., 1985
- Medgyes Péter–Rob Nolasco: When in Britain; Oxford University Press, 1990
- The non-native teacher; Macmillan, 1994
- A kommunikatív nyelvoktatás; Eötvös, Bp., 1995
- Medgyes Péter–Angi Malderez (szerk.): Changing perspectives in teacher education; Heinemann, 1996
- A nyelvtanár. A nyelvtanítás módszertana. Dialógus; jegyz., feladatok Major Éva; Corvina, Bp., 1997 (Egyetemi könyvtár)
- Laughing matters: Humour in the language classroom; Cambridge University Press, 2002
- Medgyes Péter–Major Éva: A nyelvtanár. A nyelvtanítás módszertana. Dialógus; 2. átdolg. kiad.; Corvina, Bp., 2004 (Egyetemi könyvtár)
- Mi ebben a vicc? Angol–magyar humor nyelvtanulóknak; Corvina, Bp., 2008
- Aranykor. Nyelvoktatásunk két évtizede, 1989-2009; Nemzeti Tankönyvkiadó, Bp., 2011
- Töprengések a nyelvtanításról; Eötvös, Bp., 2015
- The non-native teacher; 3. kiadás; Swan Communication, 2017
- Világgá mentem, avagy hogy kerül egy angoltanár 100 országba?; Corvina, Bp., 2018
- Milyen a jó előadó?; Corvina, Bp., 2020

== Awards ==
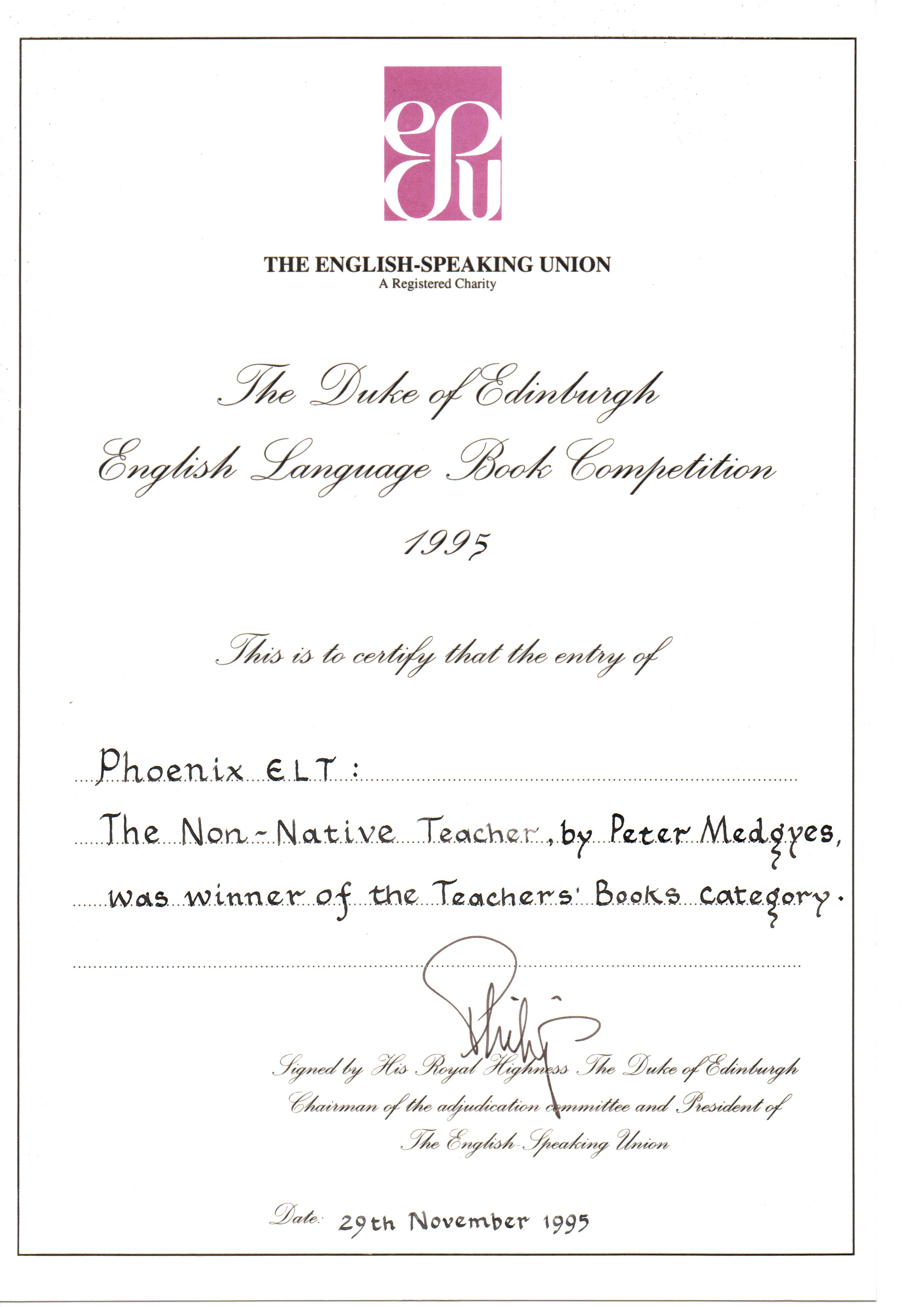
Péter Medgyes's book, a The Non-Native Teacher, won the Duke of Edinburgh prize in 1995

- Language course book award (1979, 1986)
- Soros research scholarship (USA) (1987)
- Fulbright scholarship (USA) (1988-1989)
- Visiting professor at Lancaster University (UK) (1993–94)
- Duke of Edinburgh Book Competition Award (UK) (1995)
- Hungarian gold medal (1998)
- Honorary doctor of State University of New York (USA) (1998)
