= Acta Orientalia Academiae Scientiarum Hungaricae =

- Discipline: Oriental studies
- Language: English
- Edited by: Gábor Kósa

Publication details
- History: 1950-present
- Publisher: Akadémiai Kiadó
- Frequency: Quarterly

Standard abbreviations
- ISO 4: Acta Orient. Acad. Sci. Hung.

Indexing
- ISSN: 0001-6446 (print); 1588-2667 (web)
- LCCN: 54016073
- JSTOR: 00016446
- OCLC no.: 904484908

Links
- Journal homepage

Acta Orientalia Academiae Scientiarum Hungaricae is a quarterly peer-reviewed academic journal published by Akadémiai Kiadó (Budapest, Hungary). It covers oriental studies, including Turkic, Mongolian, Manchu-Tungusian, Chinese, Japanese, Tibetan, Indian, Iranian and Semitic philology, linguistics, literature, and history of the pre-modern era. It was established in 1950. The editor-in-chief is Gábor Kósa (Eötvös Loránd University).

== Abstracting and indexing ==
The journal is abstracted and indexed in the Arts & Humanities Citation Index, Bibliographie linguistique/Linguistic Bibliography, Historical Abstracts, MLA International Bibliography, and Scopus.
