= Dürer Kert =

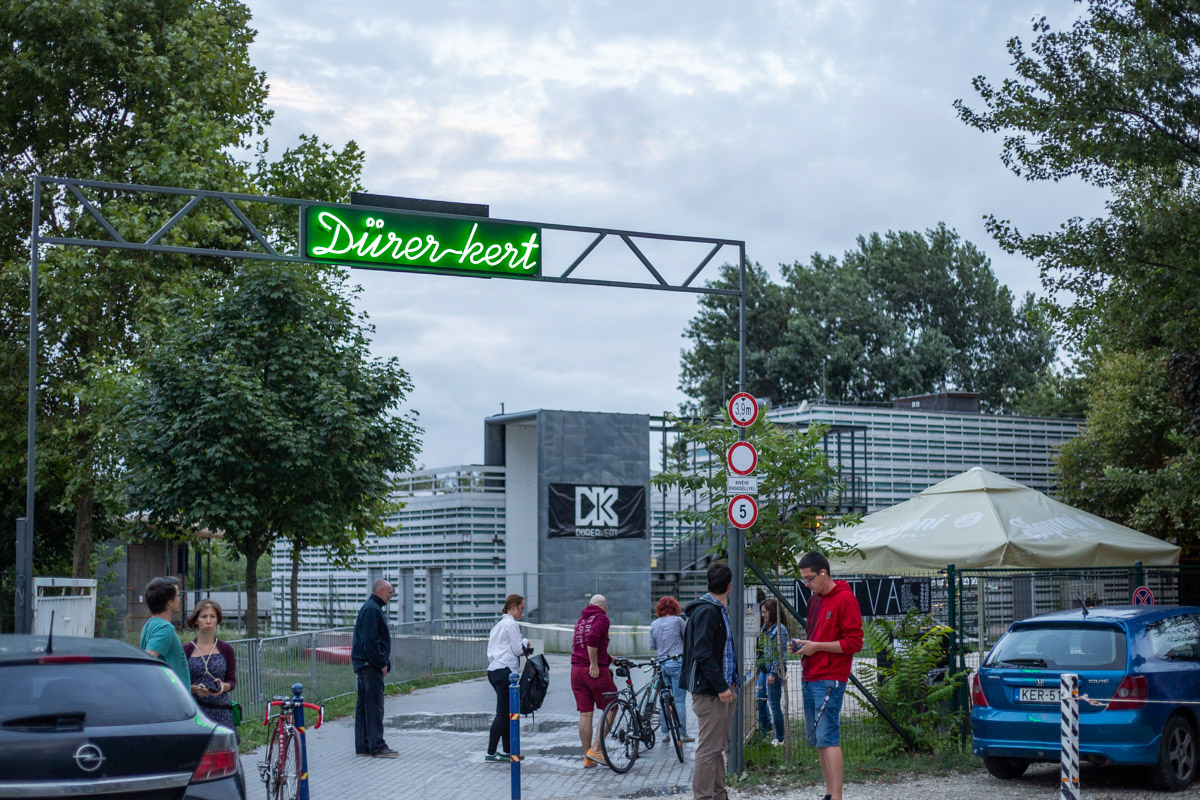
- Interactive map of Dürer Kert
- Address: Öböl utca 1. Budapest; Hungary
- Coordinates: 47.460021°N 19.05738°E
- Operator: Dürer-Part Kft.
- Capacity: main hall: 950 small hall: 270
- Type: music venue

Construction
- Opened: 2008; 2022

Website
- durerkert.com

Dürer Kert is a music venue in Budapest, Hungary, that plays a significant role in the music life of the city. It started operating in 2008 under Ajtósi Dürer sor but had to move to Újbuda due to property development of the building.

== History ==
The building on Ajtósi Dürer sor used to be a Sacré Coeur Girls' School, later functioned as a socialist party school and then was occupied by Eötvös Lorand University. When the university moved out, an Israeli businessman bought the property in 2007. The building and the practice studios that belonged to it were subsequently rented out to Dürer Kert since 2008. From 2014, the club had a five-year contract to rent the space, but had to fight to keep their tenant rights every year, as property developers envisioned the space as a living quarters and an office building. It was also suggested at one point that the property would host the Capital Circus of Budapest. In 2018, the building was acquired by István Garancsi's property development business and Dürer Kert started looking for another place to rent. During the COVID-19 pandemic, the club had to close down and eventually had to leave the premises. The building was torn down to give way to a modern office building and apartment block.

The club found a new place to rent in Újbuda in the former techno and house club Rio II, which was leased to them by BudaPart Office and Residential Park. The building was remodeled to fit the vibe and profile of Dürer Kert and to harmonize with its surroundings, namely the Kelenföld power station nearby. The new venue has two music halls; one can host 950 spectators, the smaller one is fit for 270 people. The main hall has a panorama window to the Danube, while the second floor hosts an exhibition space, a bar and the backstage. The building is surrounded by a large green space, where an open-air stage is hosted, along with areas for barbecue and a street food court.

== Gallery ==
The former Dürer Kert on Ajtósi Dürer sor

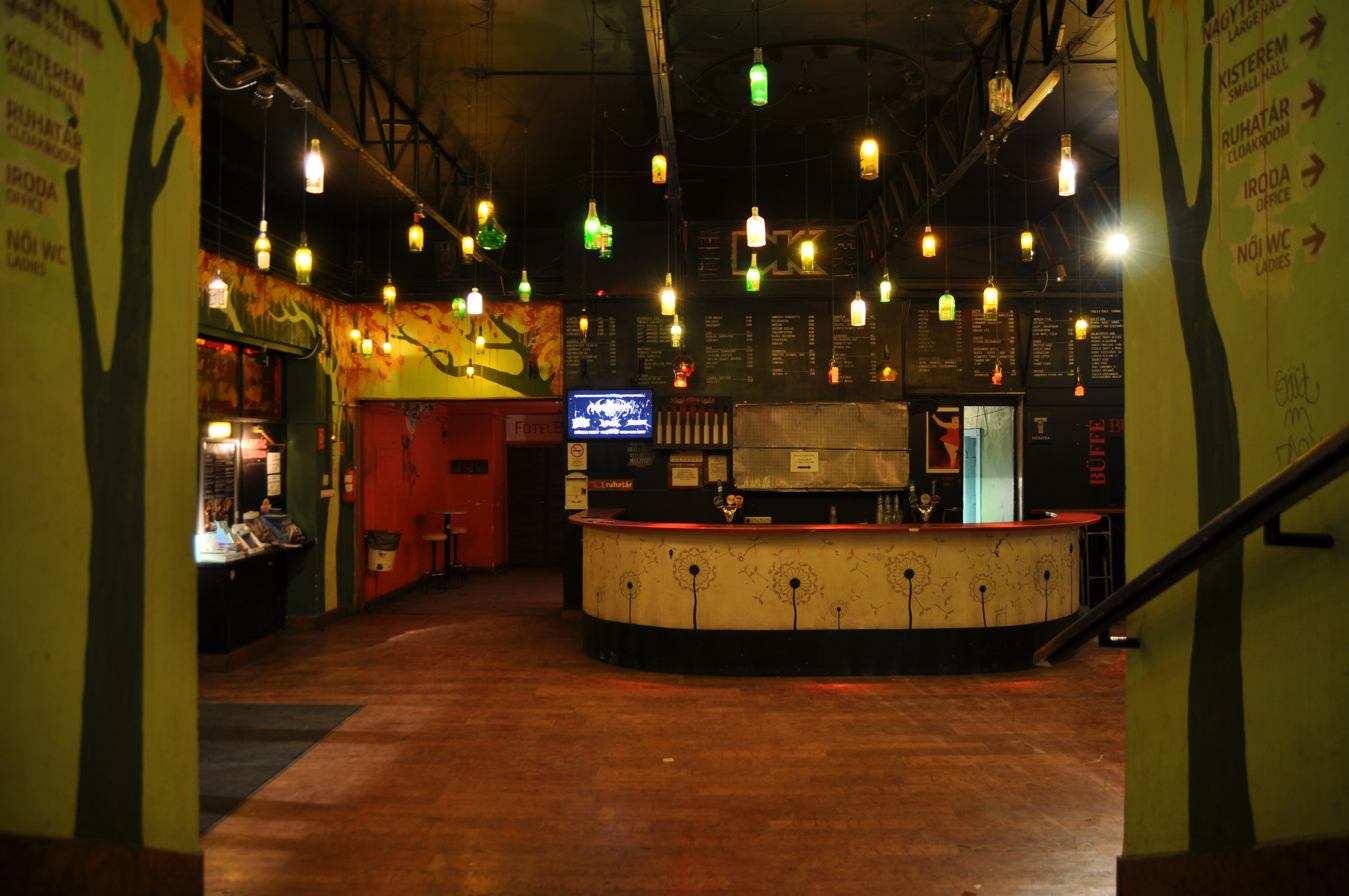
The former lobby

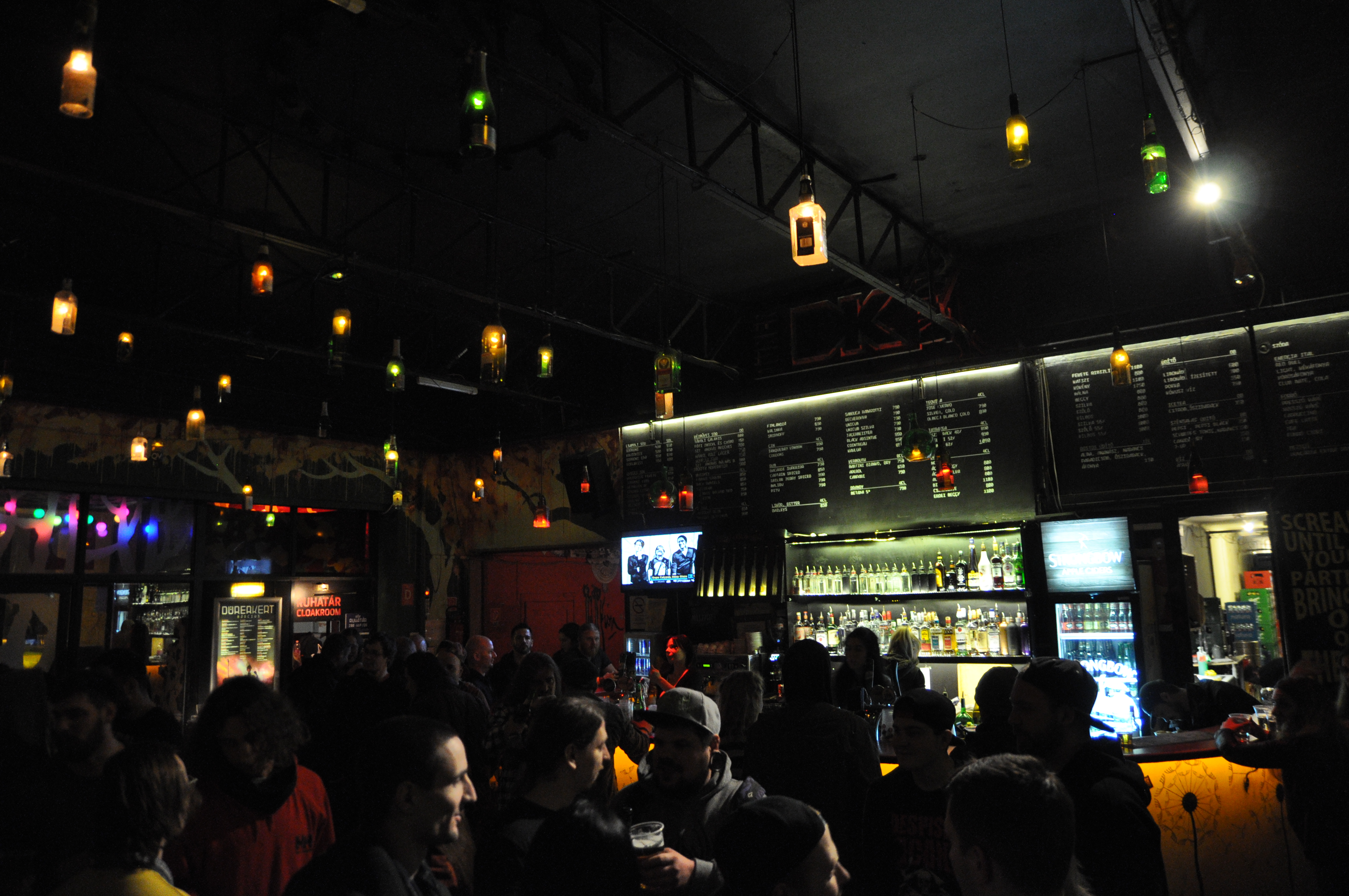
The bar

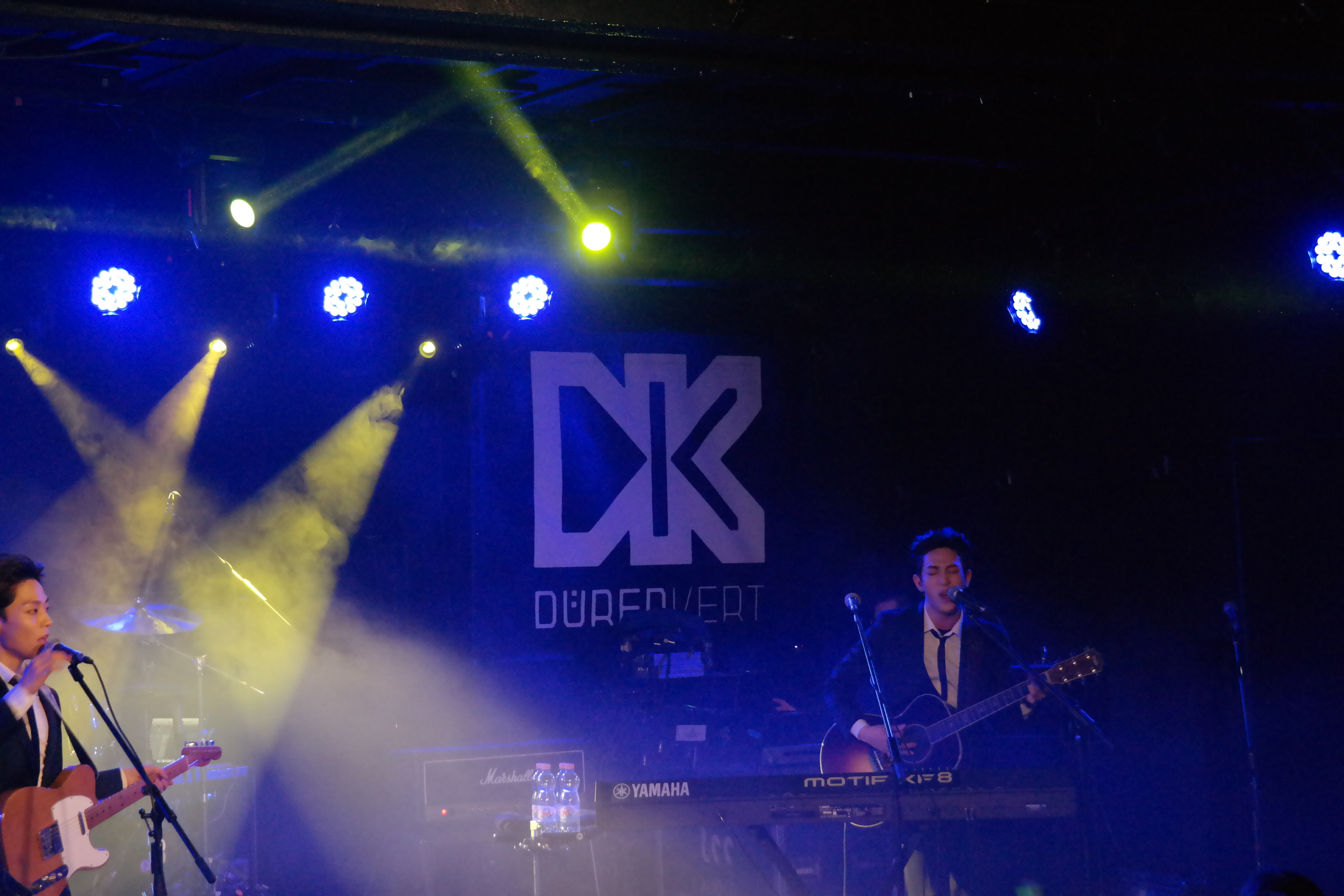
The main stage with The Rose performing
The new Dürer Kert

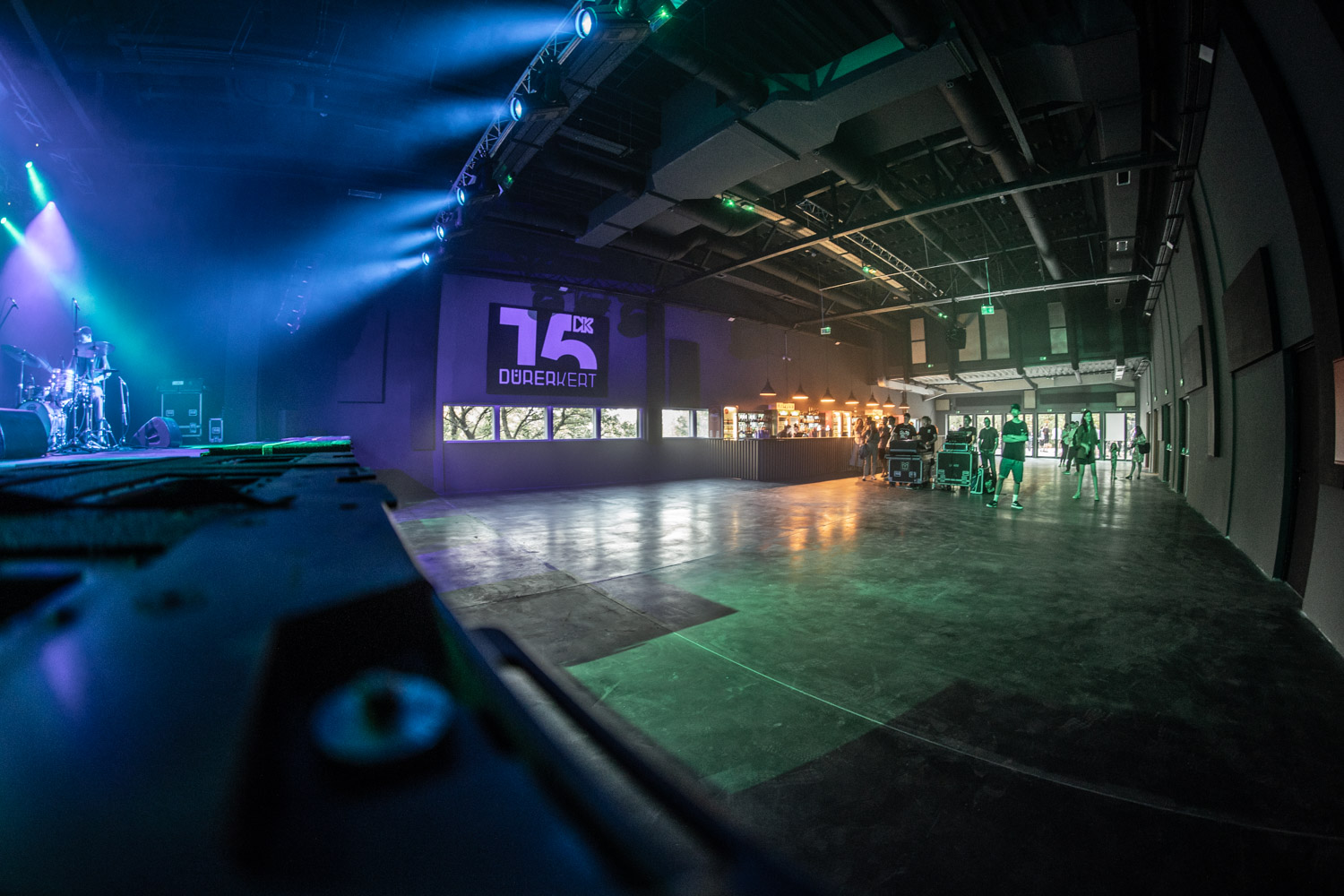
The bigger hall

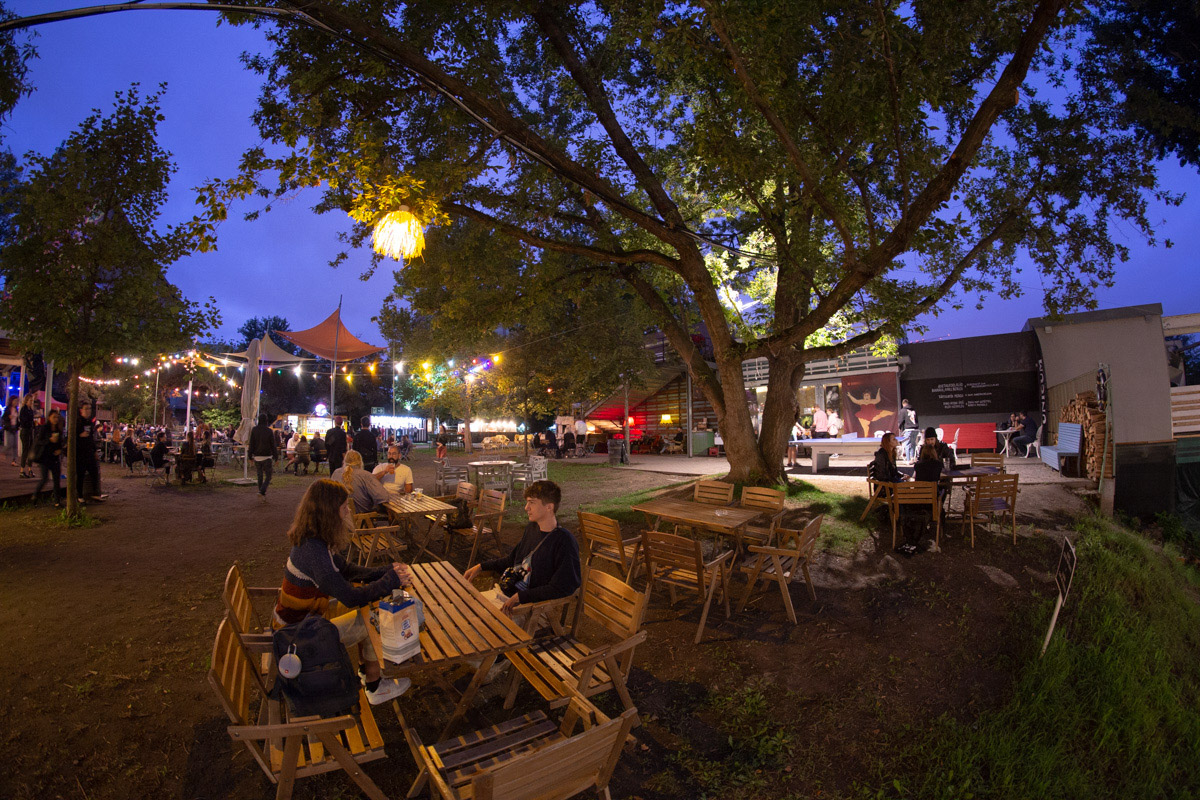
The garden
