= Ajtósi Dürer sor =

Road in Budapest, Hungary

Coordinates: 47°30′38″N 19°5′27″E

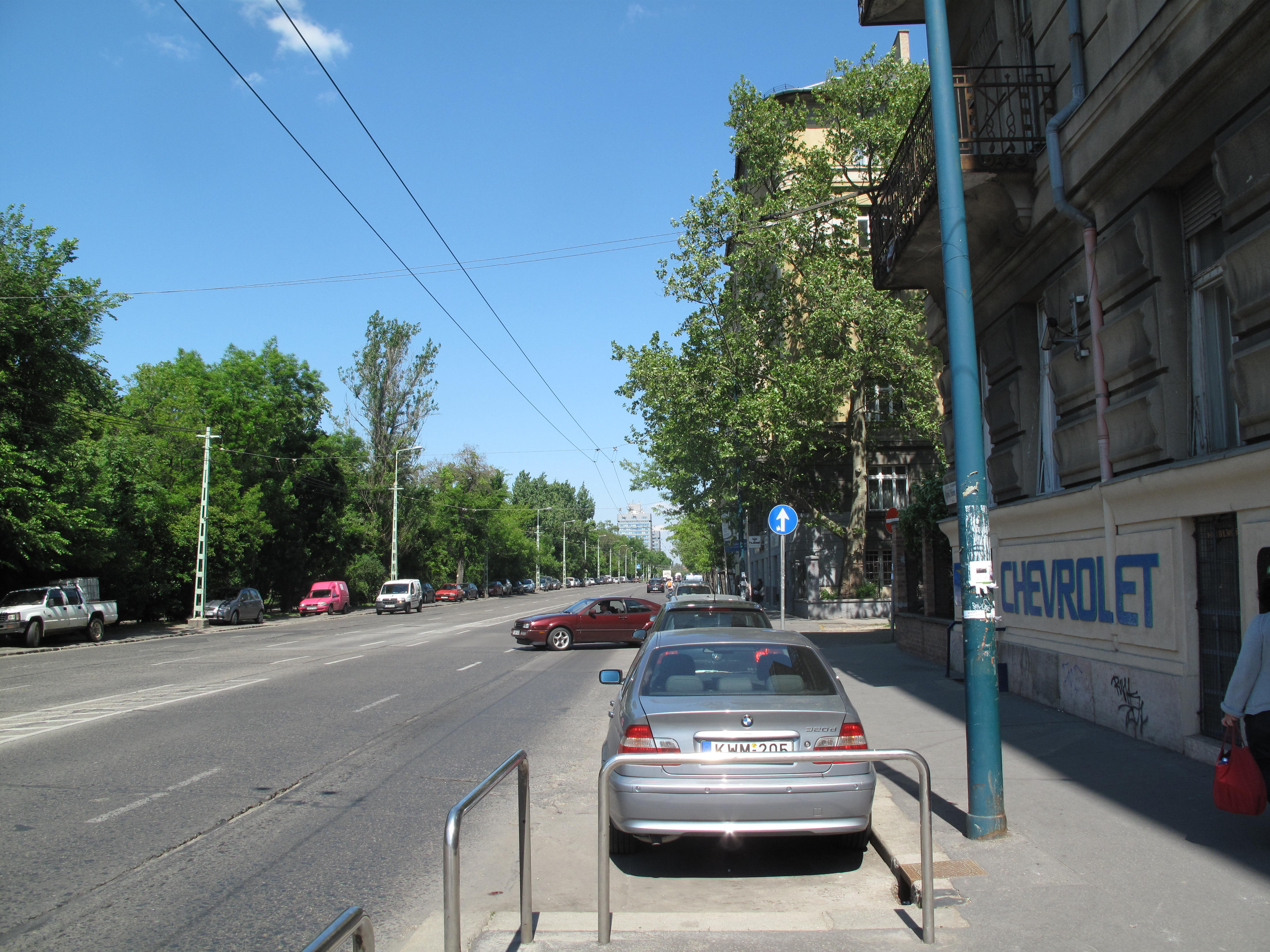
Ajtósi Dürer sor in Budapest District XIV

Ajtósi Dürer sor is a road in the XIV. district of Budapest, Hungary, along the south-eastern edge of Városliget, between Dózsa György út and Hungária körút (Hungary Boulevard). The buildings date back from the end of the 19th century and the interwar period. Its name was given in 1929 on the occasion of the 400th anniversary of Albrecht Dürer's death.

== History ==
It was built 1847 originally named István sor/ German: Stephans Weg (Stephan Road) after Archduke Stephen, making reference to the neighboring quarter of Herminamező, which is named after his twin sister Archduchess Hermine of Austria, who in 1842 died. The same logic lead to the quarter name of Istvánmező; István sor being part of the borderline in between them.

The connection between the Dózsa György út to Hermina was rebaptized Ajtósi Dürer sor to commemorate the 400 years anniversary of Albrecht Dürer's death, referring to his family's place of origin at Ajtós. The short section between Hermina út and Francia út remained István sor until 1949, when it was also restyled due to the anti-nobility ideology of the communist regime.

== Buildings ==
- No. 15.: Building of Saint Stephen Secondary Grammar School. Built by Sándor Baumgartner in 1902.
- No. 19–21.: Building of the ex Sacré Coeur School for Young Ladies designed by Gyula Rimanóczy in 1938. This is where music venue Dürer Kert operated, before the building was demolished for property development purposes.
- No. 23. : Ajtósi Dürer Dormatory, maintained and owned by ELTE
- No. 25.: Villa of sculptor György Zala designed by Ödön Lechner, Zoltán Bálint and Lajos Jámbor in 1900.
- No. 37.: Erzsébet School for Women designed by Sándor Baumgarten in 1902
- No. 39.: School and Dormitory of Blind, built by Sándor Baumgartner and Zsigmond Herczegh in 1907
