= Sapientia University =

Private university in Cluj-Napoca, Romania

Coordinates: 46.7677°N 23.5911°E

- Sapientia Erdélyi Magyar Tudományegyetem (in Hungarian); Universitatea Sapientia (in Romanian)
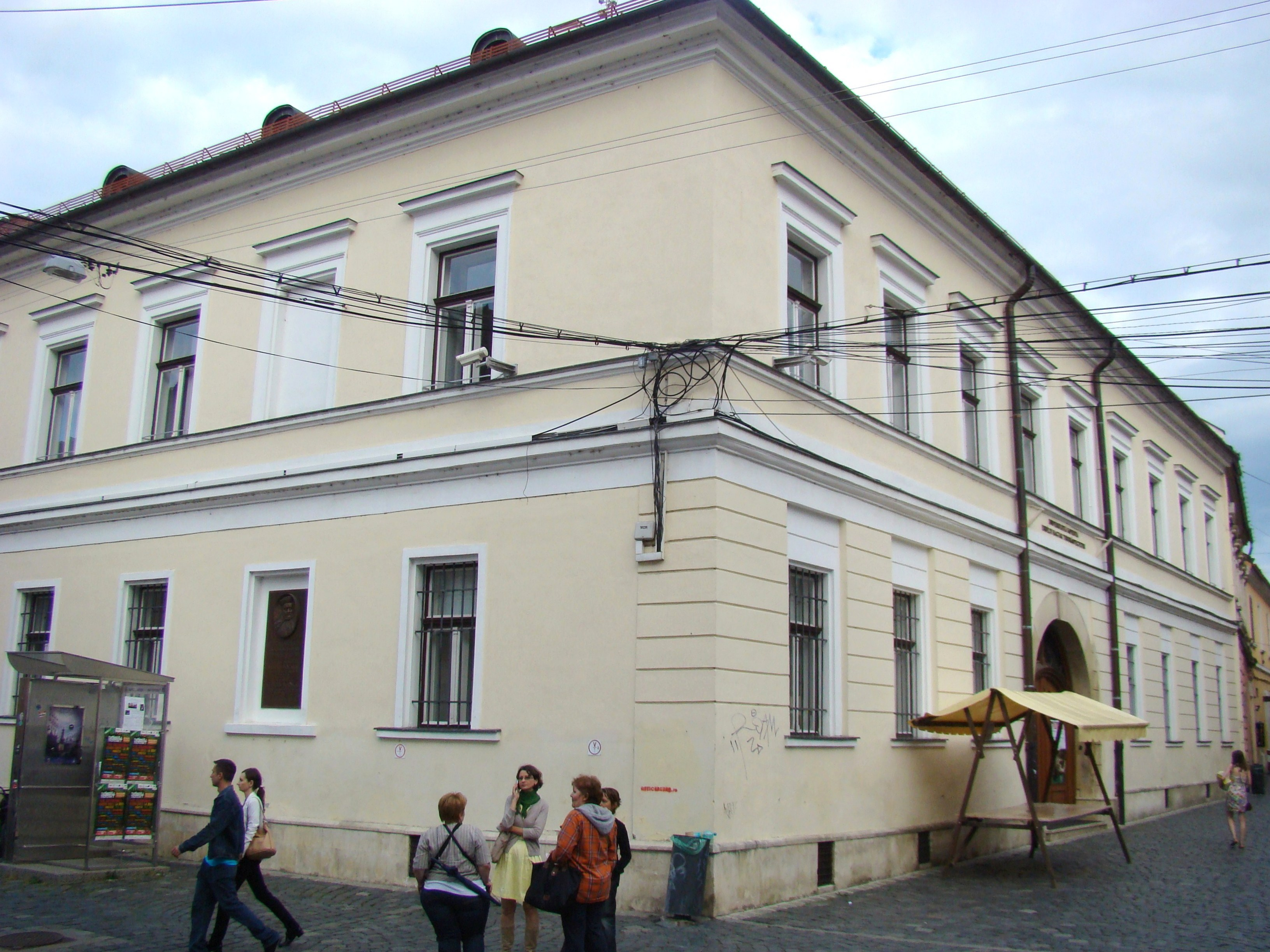
- Rector's office in Cluj-Napoca
- Type: Private
- Established: 2001
- Rector: Tonk Márton
- Students: 2,239 (2016-2017)
- Location: Cluj-Napoca, Romania
- Campuses: Cluj-Napoca, Miercurea Ciuc, Târgu Mureș
- Website: www.sapientia.ro

The Sapientia – Hungarian University of Transylvania is a private higher education institution in Hungarian language in the historic region of Transylvania, Romania.

== History ==
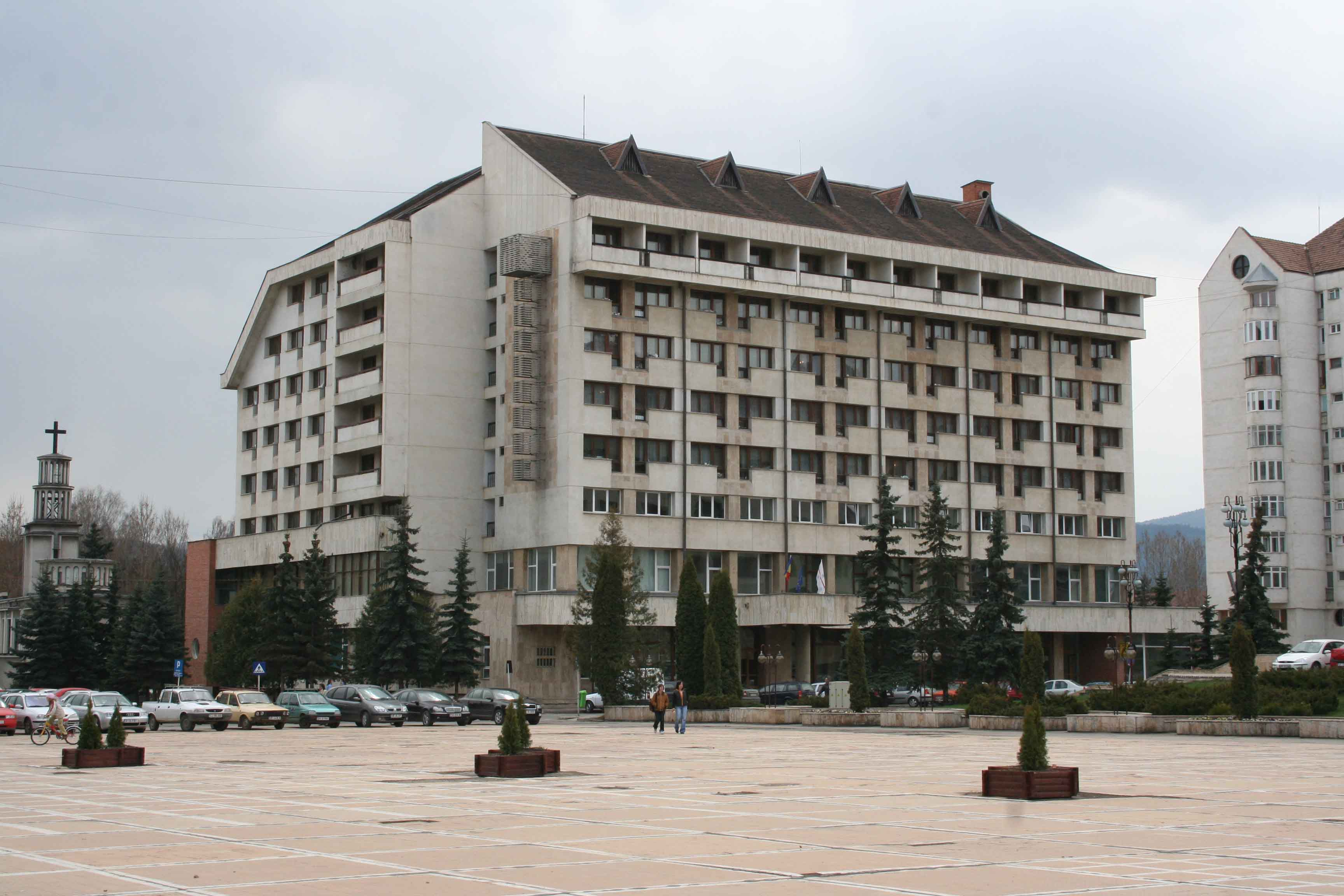
University building in Miercurea Ciuc

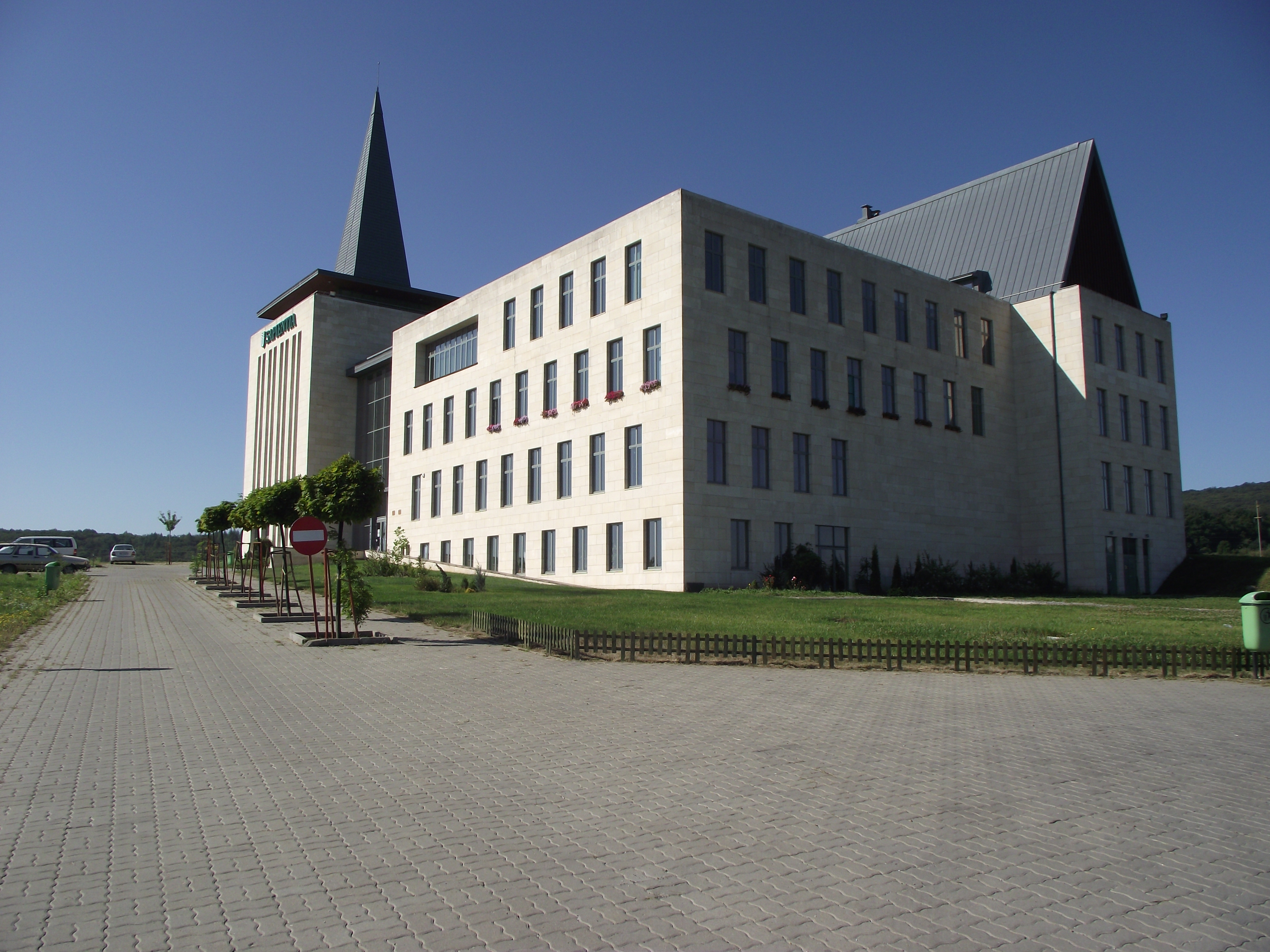
University building in Târgu Mureș

Sapientia University was established with the support of the Hungarian Government and funded by the Sapientia Foundation. The latter, in turn, was founded by the four Hungarian historical churches of Transylvania: the Roman Catholic Church, the Calvinist Reformed Church in Romania, the Unitarian Church of Transylvania and the Hungarian-speaking Evangelical Lutheran Church.

Its establishment was motivated by needs outgrowing the present choice of Hungarian university education in Romania, especially that the percentage of Hungarian students in Romanian university life does not represent the percentage of Hungarian population in Romania, and university education in Hungarian does not cover the range of necessary specializations. From among the 25,000 Hungarian students in Romania only one of three may study in their mother language.

To fill what it saw as this gap and fulfil the needs described above, the Board of Trustees of the Sapientia Foundation founded by the eight leaders of the Hungarian Historic Churches in Transylvania on April 14, 2000, decided to establish the Hungarian University of Transylvania. The university is open to qualified students of any nationality who meet the required admissions.

The university was accredited by the Romanian Law 58/2012.

== Structure ==
Sapientia University is made up of 3 faculties and one department:

- Faculty of Economics, Socio-Human Sciences and Engineering, in Miercurea Ciuc, with programmes in Agro-alimentary Economy, Management Accounting and IT, Sociology (Rural Development Studies), Romanian and English Language and Literature, Food Engineering, Environmental Protection and Engineering in Industry, General Economics, Social Communication and Public Relations, Environmental Economics.
- Faculty of Sciences and Arts, in Cluj-Napoca, with programmes in Environmental Geography, Film and Media Studies, International relations – European Studies, Legal Studies (Law School).
- Faculty of Technical and Human Sciences, in Târgu Mureș.
- with BSc study programmes in Informatics, Mechatronics, Machine Manufacturing Engineering, Computer Science, Automation and Applied Informatics, Telecommunication Systems and Technologies, Communication and Public Relations, Horticultural Engineering, Landscape Architecture, Translation and Interpreting, Public Health Services and Policies; Also Agricultural Engineering and Forestry at Sfântu Gheorghe location.
- MSc study programmes in Advanced Mechatronics Systems, Intelligent Control Systems, Software Development and Plant Protection.
- Scientific Research Department, in Cluj-Napoca.
