= Ágnes Szokolszky =

Hungarian psychologist (born 1956)

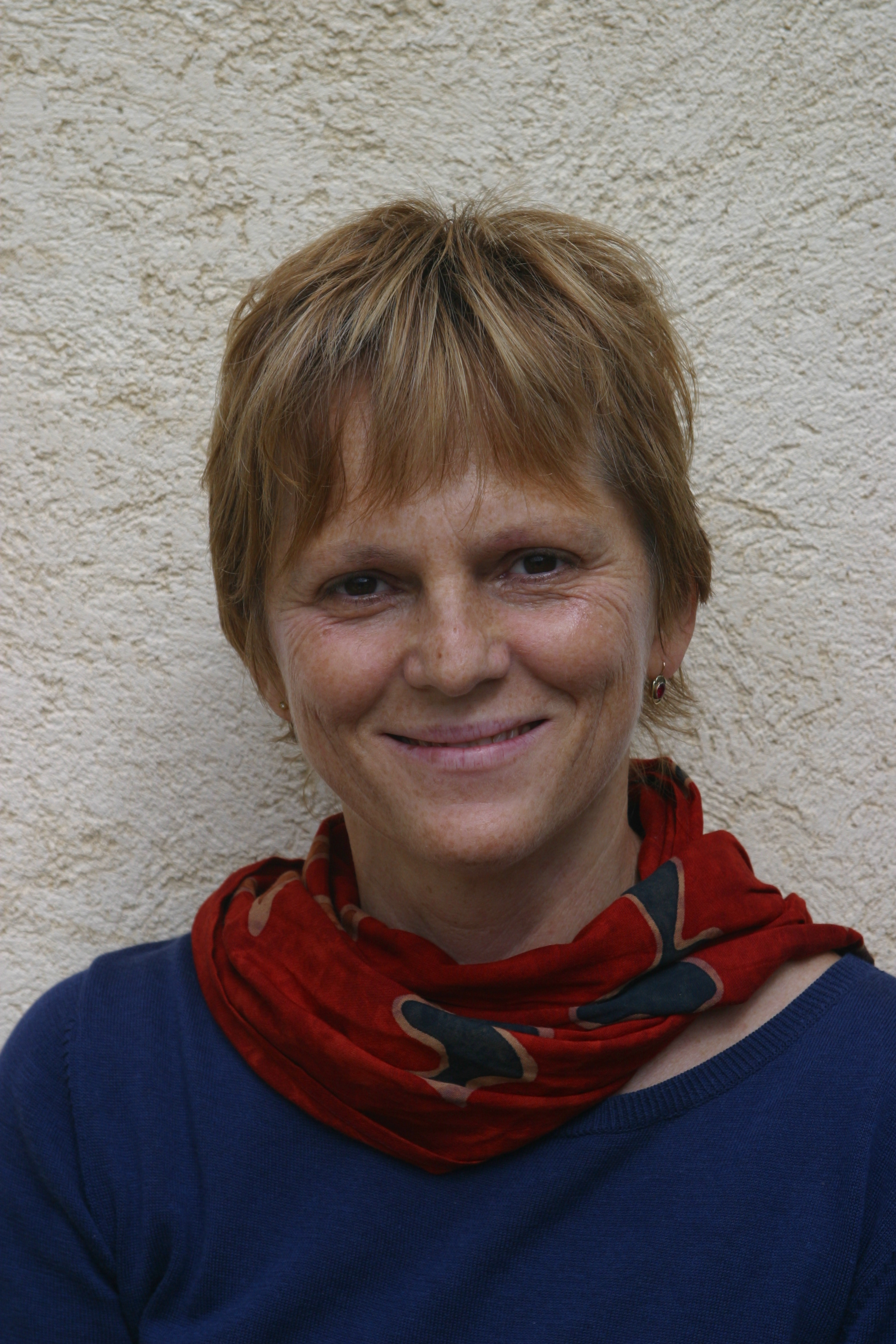
- Born: July 6, 1956 (age 70); Budapest, Hungary
- Spouse: Tamás Fellegi
- Children: 2
- Awards: Soros Foundation‑Open Society Fellowship, New York, (1988); University of Connecticut Predoctoral Fellowships, (1987-1992); P.E.O. International Scholarship, United States, (1990-1993)
- Scientific career
- Fields: Ecological psychology; Cognitive science; History of psychology and its methods of research
- Workplaces: Eötvös Loránd University; University of Connecticut; University of Szeged; Institute of Psychology, Szeged

Notes
- Conductor of Institute of Psychology in Szeged from (2006)

Ágnes Szokolszky (6 July 1956) is a Hungarian educator and psychologist, a habilitated associate professor and director of the Institute of Psychology, Szeged.

Her fields of research are ecological psychology (with special regard to James and Eleanor J. Gibson’s schools), cognitive science (inside this certain theories of cognitive developmental psychology), history of psychology and its methods of research. Empirical research interests: symbolic play and metaphor production of childhood.

== Biography ==
Ágnes Szokolszky was born in an educator family, her father, István Szokolszky (1915–1968) was one of the significant representatives of Hungarian pedagogy, her grandfather Rezső Szokolszky held a position of instructor and royal school-inspector. For Ágnes Szokolszky it was natural to carry on the family's tradition of following a profession in education. This was also pressed by her father's untimely death. She made her studies at the Faculty of Humanities of the Eötvös Loránd University in English literature, history, and pedagogy specializations. After the end of her studies she started to teach at Vörösmarty Mihály Grammar School, then at the Department of Pedagogy of the Eötvös Loránd University.

She obtained her Ph.D. degree in experimental psychology at the Psychological Department of the University of Connecticut, United States. She made her PhD studies and defended her dissertation at the Center for the Ecological Study of Perception and Action (CESPA) which works as a part of the Department of Psychology, University of Connecticut.

From 1996 Ágnes Szokolszky is an instructor and researcher of the Department of Psychology, József Attila University, Szeged (from 2000 it is called University of Szeged). In 1999 she became a member of the Cognition Science Group, engaged in the Cognitive Programme of Szeged, organized by Csaba Pléh. From 2006 she is the director and associate professor of the Department of Psychology, Szeged. From 2007 she is a habilitated associate professor, from 2008 director of the Institute of Psychology, Szeged.

In connection with her fields of research she participates in numerous international and national conferences, her lectures are being published.

== Selected works ==
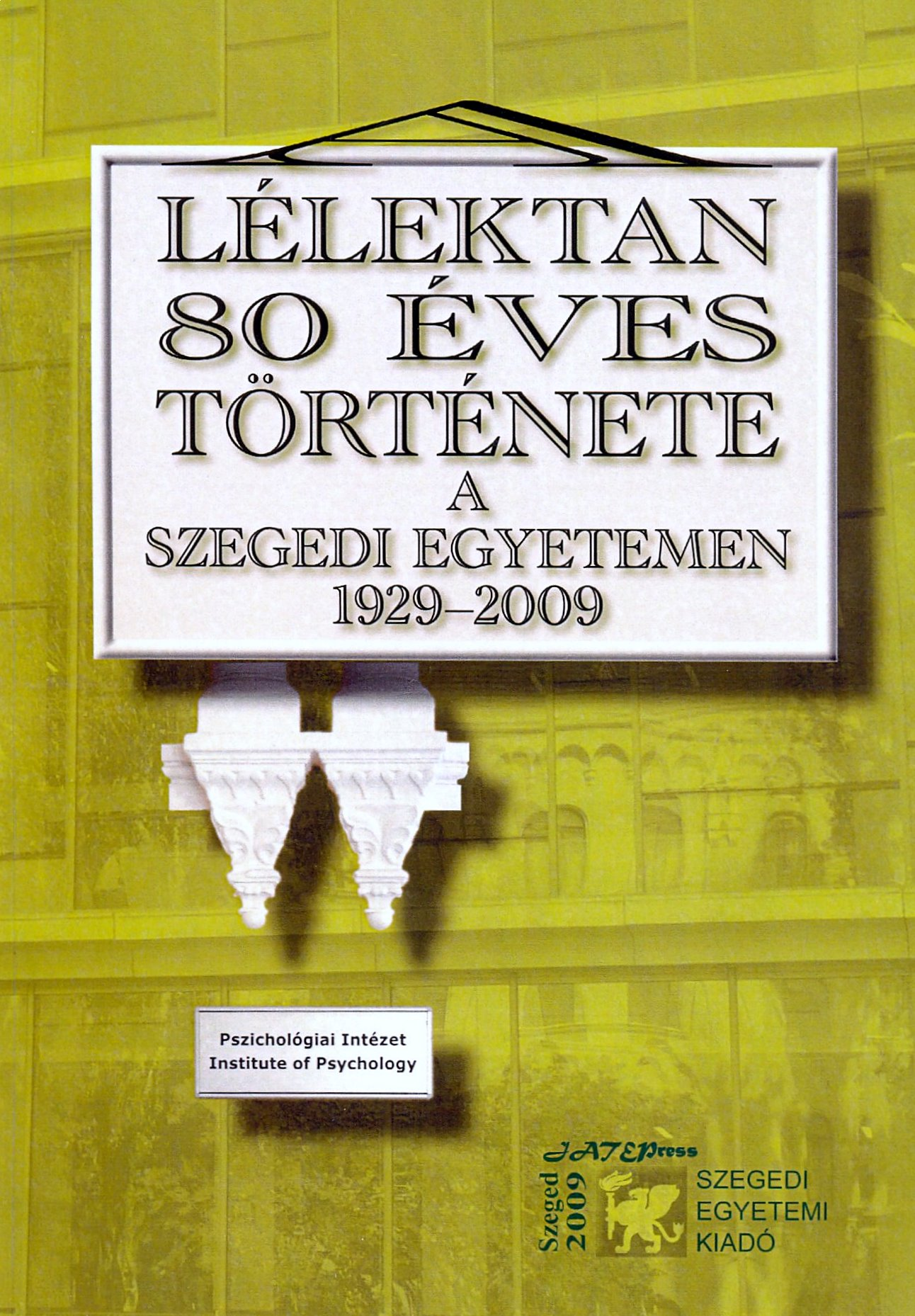
The Institute of Psychology at the University of Szeged is 80 years old (1929-2009)/ ed. by Ágnes Szokolszky

=== In Hungarian ===
- Tankönyvekről mindenkinek. [by György Horváth ... et al.]; compiled and edited by János Karlovitz; [bibliography compiled by Ágnes Szokolszky] (1980). Budapest, Tankönyvkiadó
- "Az iskola élő alternativái: alternativ iskolák az Egyesült Államokban". (1989). In: Valóság, 1, pp. 77–87.
- Pedagógiai és pszichológiai tárgyak: a nevelési folyamat pszichológiája : Interperszonális kapcsolat és kommunikáció a tanár-diák szerepviszonylatban. With Edit Bauer (1990). Budapest, Aula
- Kutatómunka a pszichológiában: metodológia, módszerek, gyakorlat (2004). Budapest, Osiris Kiadó
- "Környezet - pszichológia. Egy ökológiai rendszerszemléletű szintézis körvonalai". With Andrea Dúll (2006). In: Magyar Pszichológiai Szemle, 61. köt. 1. sz. 9-34.
- A lélektan 80 éves története a szegedi egyetemen. = The Institute of Psychology at the University of Szeged is 80 years old (1929–2009)/ ed. by Ágnes Szokolszky; authors Szokolszky Ágnes, Pataki Márta, Polyák Kamilla et al. Szeged, JATEPress, 2009. 302 p. ISBN 978-963-482-959-1
- "A lélektan 80 éve a szegedi egyetemen (1929-2009)" = 80 years' history of psychology in the University of Szeged, with Pataki M., Polyák K., Németh D. Magyar Pszichológiai Szemle, vol. 64. No. 4. December 2009. 671–676. p.

=== In English ===
- The direct realist core in G. Lakoff's and M. Johnson's theory of concepts and metaphors. (1992) Jean Piaget Society, Philadelphia
- "Where do metaphors come from? Metaphor and Symbolic Activity". With Dent-Read, C. Special Issue on Visual Rhetoric. 8/3, 1993. 227–242.
- "An Interview With Eleanor Gibson", Ecological Psychology, 2003, 15(4), 271–281.
- "Pretend Object Play - Symbolic or Functional?" In: Doing things with things : the design and use of everyday objects edited by Alan Costall and Ole Dreier. Aldershot, England; Burlington, VT : Ashgate, 2006. 242 p. (Ser. Ethnoscapes) ISBN 0-7546-4656-4 (alk. paper); ISBN 978-0-7546-4656-3; ISBN 978-0-7546-4656-3 (alk. paper)
- Using scholarly literature in psychology : how to find what you need, read what you have found, and how to write it up (2009). Szeged, JATEPress, 214 p.

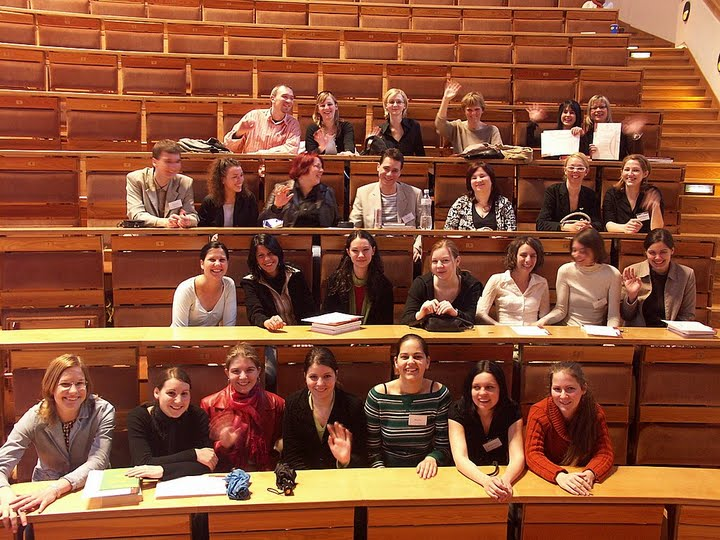
The National Scientific Conference for University Students, Piliscsaba, 2007

=== Conference lectures and publications ===
- "Using An Object As If It Were Another: The Perception And Use Of Affordances In Pretend Object Play" (1997) In: M. A. Schmuckler & J. M. Kennedy (Eds.), Studies in Perc, LEA, Mawah, N.J.
- "A gyermeki észlelés dinamikája: tárgyi mintha játék és metafóra használat". (Előadás 1998). A Magyar Pszichológiai Társaság XIII. országos tudományos nagygyűlése, Budapest, 1998. április 15–18.
- "The development of spoon-use in the daily routine of infants - A naturalistic observation study", with Devánszki, É. (2007) LEA, Mawah, N. J, 241–248.

=== Editing ===
- Környezet-pszichológia, with Andrea Dúll (2006). Budapest, Akadémiai Kiadó
- Szegedi pszichológiai tanulmányok, with Dezső Németh and Attila Krajcsi (2007). Szeged, SZEK JGYF Kiadó

== Social memberships ==
- MTA II. Filozófiai és Történettudományok Osztálya Pszichológiai Bizottság
- Magyar Pszichológiai Társaság (The Hungarian Psychological Association)
- The International Society for Ecological Psychology (ISEP)

== See also ==
- Cognitive Science and Neuropsychology Program of Szeged
- Institute of Psychology (Szeged)
