= Cognitive Science and Neuropsychology Program of Szeged =

- Megismeréstudományi és Neuropszichológiai program
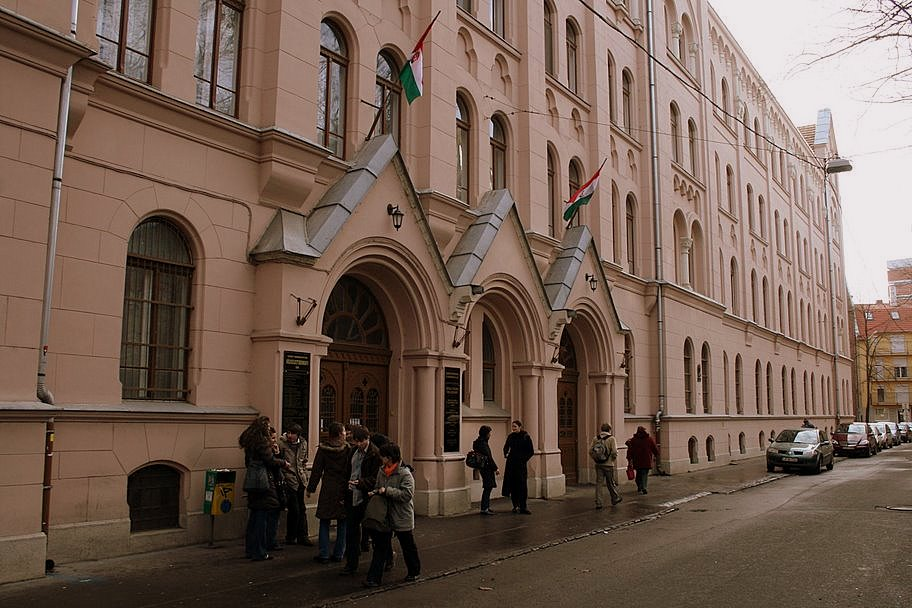
- Portal of Faculty of Arts, University of Szeged. Location in Hungary Location in Szeged downtown
- Parent institution: University of Szeged; Institute of Psychology; Cognitive Science and Neuropsychology Group, Szeged
- Address: 6722 Szeged, Egyetem utca 2. Pszichológia Intézet, Hungary
- Fields of teaching and research: Neuropsychology, Cognitive science, Cognitive science of mathematics, Neuropsychology of the subcortical structures and the cerebellum, Memory disorders, Evolutionary psychology
- Website: kognit.edpsy.u-szeged.hu

The Cognitive Science and Neuropsychology Program was organised by Csaba Pléh, in 1999 at the Institute of Psychology, University of Szeged. The aim of the program is to introduce the theories and methods of cognitive science and neuropsychology both to undergraduate students and researchers from other fields. The program welcomes guest professors, international students and other interested students and researchers for participation and collaboration. The program has the intent of becoming an interface between cognitive labs and disciplines in cognitive science, broadly conceived in Central Europe. In 2011-2012 the members of this group left University of Szeged. This group does not exist anymore. The members went to the University of Debrecen, the Hungarian Academy of Sciences, Eötvös Loránd University, etc.

== Cognitive Science and Neuropsychology Group in Szeged ==
=== Members (until 2011) ===
- WINKLER, István
- SZOKOLSZKY, Ágnes
- RACSMÁNY, Mihály
- KRAJCSI, Attila
- NÉMETH, Dezső
- TISLJÁR, Roland
- CSIFCSÁK, Gábor
- JANACSEK, Karolina

== See also ==
- Institute of Psychology (Szeged)
