= Institute of Psychology (Szeged) =

Coordinates: 46°14′51″N 20°08′25″E

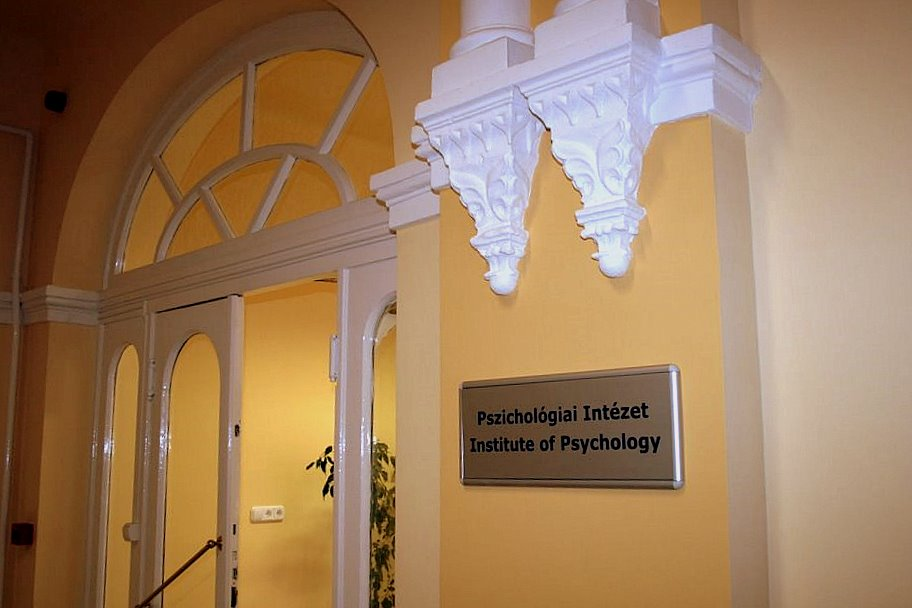
Institute of Psychology
University of Szeged; Faculty of Arts
Built:	in 1912, in Neo-Roman style
Address:	6722 Szeged, Egyetem utca 2.
Founded:	18 December 1929.
Anniversary:	80th (1929–2009)
Official homepage:	http://www.pszich.u-szeged.hu/

Institute of Psychology of the University of Szeged, Szeged, Hungary, is located at 2 Egyetem Street, at the Szeged University Campus of the Faculty of Arts. The Institute of Psychology in Szeged is the longest-standing psychology institute in Hungary (founded on 18 December 1929).

Today, the Institute provides a three-year Psychology Bachelor of Arts (BA) training, followed by a two-year Master of Arts (MA) course in 2 possible majors: Cognitive and Neuropsychology, or Counseling and Educational Psychology.

== The beginnings (1872-1919) ==
The legal predecessor of the University of Szeged was the University of Cluj-Napoca (Kolozsvár) (Franz Joseph University), which was founded in 1872, by Franz Joseph as the second university in Hungary of that time. Psychology-oriented studies existed from the earliest days, but were taught by professors of Philosophy and Pedagogy. Psychology was first recognized as a separate subject by Professor Imre Sándor at the University of Szeged.

== The beginnings of psychology education in Szeged (1921-1929) ==
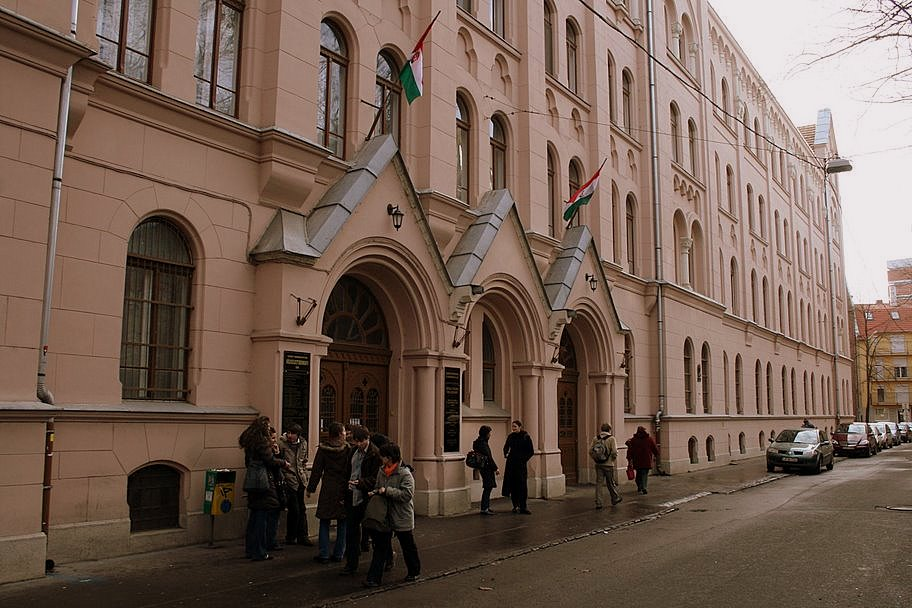
The Faculty of Arts, University of Szeged

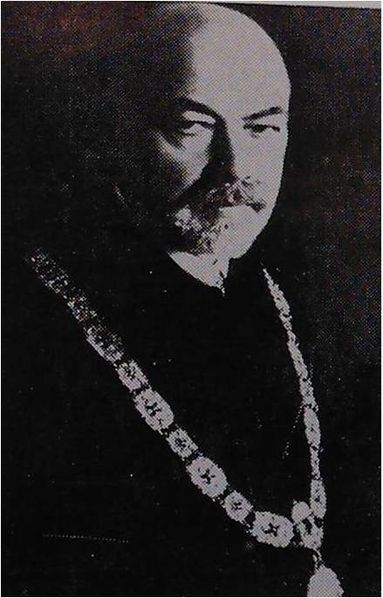
Sándor Imre (1877–1945) pedagogue

By 1919, the turmoils of history forced the University of Cluj-Napoca to relocate, and in 1921, the Hungarian National Assembly (according to the terms of Act XXV of 1921) designated the town of Szeged as the temporary location of the university. The former campus site was the Neo-Renaissance building in Szeged's Dugonics Square, originally built as a secondary school for modern languages and sciences in 1873. From 1925, the Faculty of Arts and part of the Faculty of Sciences were moved to the Neo-Roman building at 2 Egyetem Street, formerly a railway discount broker's office. The three-story building was built in 1912, according to the plans of Ottoway István and Winkler Imre.

Psychology was first recognized as a major subject at the university by Professor Imre Sándor, who realized that the study of psychology is just as important as that of pedagogy. Accordingly, on 20 October 1926, he filed his petition to the directors of the university for the establishment of a fundamentally different, modern Department of Pedagogy and Psychology. György Málnási Bartók, the Professor of the Department of Philosophy, was an avid supporter of the petition, since the tuition of Psychology had been the responsibility of his department at that period. In his petition, Imre Sándor listed the following fields and branches as belonging to the new Department's sphere of competence: General Psychology, Developmental Psychology, Psychology of Differences, Education of Backward Children, Psychotechnics, and Pedagogical Somatology.

== Psychology education between 1929 and 1940 ==
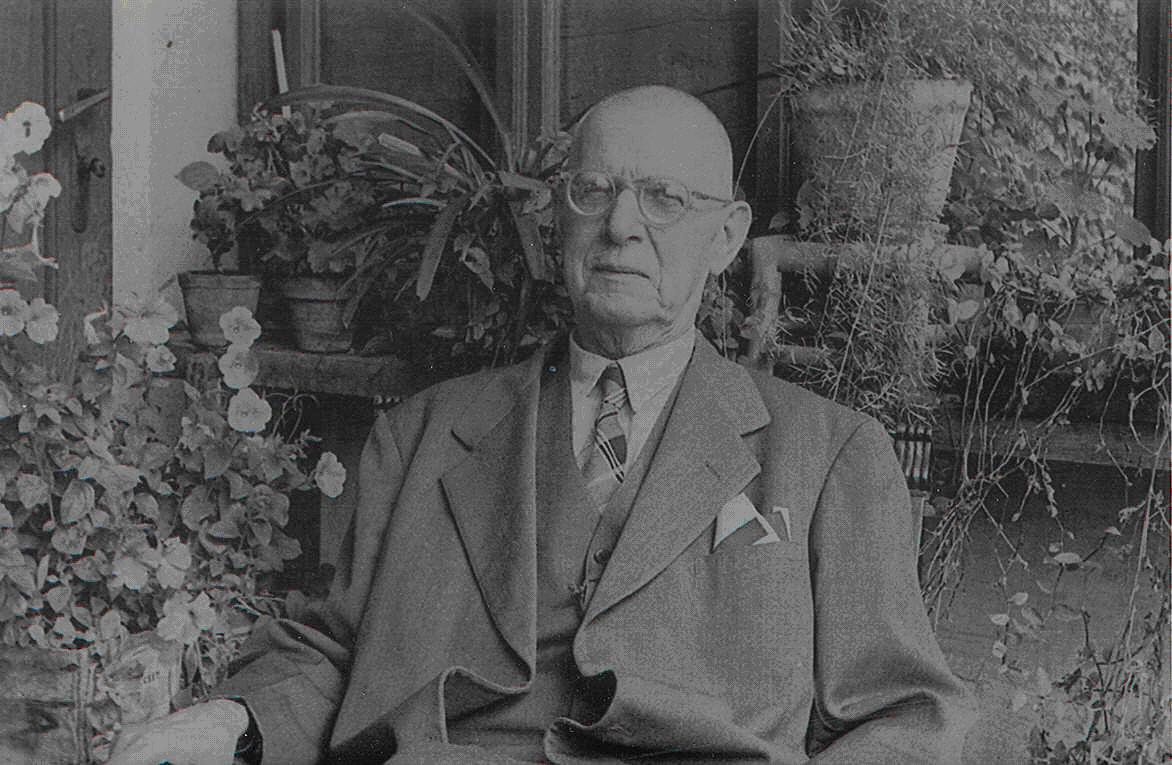
Málnási Bartók György (1882–1970) Portrait from Mikes International Foundation

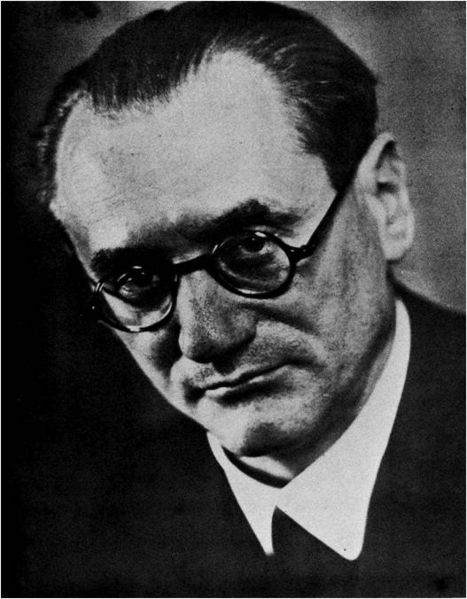
Dezső Hildebrand Várkonyi (1888–1971)

In 1929, the establishment of the Second Department of Pedagogy and Psychology was brought about by lucky circumstances, given that the petition of Imre Sándor and György Málnási Bartók would not have been sufficient by itself. At the University of Szeged, which had been relocated from Cluj-Napoca, the Faculty of Arts had a very low number of attending students, which threatened the very existence of the university. In the fall of 1928, to aid the foundering university, the Minister of Culture, Kuno Klebelsberg, ordered the relocation of the Paedagogum and the academic section of Erzsébet Girls’ School to Szeged. Thus, the Teacher Training College for secular elementary schools was founded. As part of their curriculum, students of the college had to complete a part of their training – essentially one of the two compulsory majors – at the university, hence boosting the number of students there. At the same time, the Minister abrogated secular teacher training at nun schools, which meant that nuns also had to attend the University of Szeged to receive such training.

Kuno Klebelsberg himself did not consider religion an important factor in university appointments. However, under the pressure of Catholic bishops, he founded separate Catholic departments. Thus, the first head of the Second Department of Philosophy was János Mester (1879–1954), a Catholic professor, while the First Department of Philosophy was led by the Protestant György Málnási Bartók. Likewise, the Second Department of Literature and the Second Department of Pedagogy and Psychology were founded with the leaderships of Catholic professor Sándor Sík and Dezső Várkonyi Hildebrand from the Benedictine Order respectively, on the other hand, the Protestant First Department of Literature and the First Department of Pedagogy and Psychology were led by Lajos Dézsi and Sándor Imre respectively. A very useful followed. Both Dezső Várkonyi Hildebrand and Sándor Sík were excellent educators at the university and besides Philosophy, János Mester also engaged himself in studies of Psychology and Pedagogy.

On 18 December 1929, Dezső Hildebrand Várkonyi, a Benedictine monk was appointed as the Head of the Independent Institute of Pedagogy and Psychology. His appointment brought changes to the education at the University of Szeged. In Hungary, such an Independent Institute of Pedagogy and Psychology was founded in Szeged for the first time, only later to be followed by the establishment of the Department of Psychology at the University of Budapest, under the supervision of Pál Schiller Harkai in 1936.

Following the appointment of Várkonyi, psychology training at the University of Szeged could develop further, primarily focusing on the mainstream Psychology of that time, namely on questions of Paedology, Developmental Psychology and Educational Psychology.

Várkonyi introduced more modern fields of Psychology, including the work of Sigmund Freud, Alfred Adler, Carl Gustav Jung and Jean Piaget. According to the recollections of his students, his lectures sometimes deviated from the formal rhetorical style and took on a more familiar character.

In the 1930s, István Boda, a Privatdocent at the University, held a series of lectures on the survey of the intellectuals, and the practical psychology of self-development.

The year 1940 brought another change in the life of the Institute and the university itself. Following the re-annexation of Northern Transylvania, the Franz Joseph University of Sciences was relocated back to Cluj-Napoca, together with the majority of its teachers, Dezső Várkonyi Hildenbrand among them.

== Psychology education at Horthy Miklós University of Sciences ==
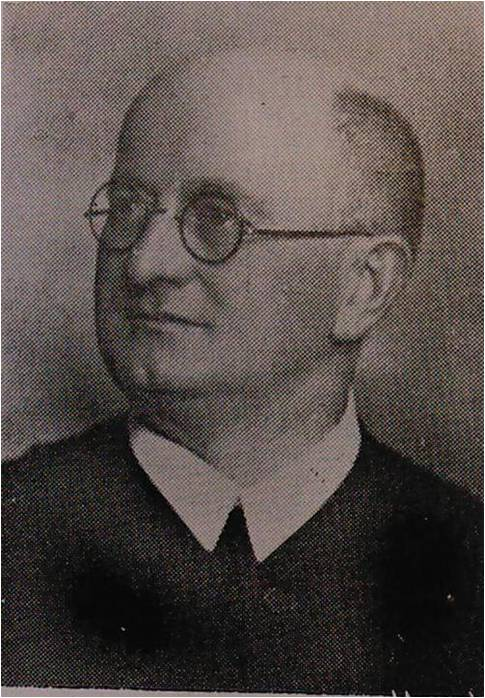
Pál Cecil Bognár (1883–1967) psychologist

In 1940, a new university was founded in Szeged, named after Horthy Miklós. The Institute of Psychology was established in 1941, as a new unit, with the Bendectine Pál Bognár Cecil – well known in the scientific circles of the time - appointed as Head of Institute.

Cecil Bognár's work at the Institute was focused on Child Psychology and Educational Science; in his publications, he primarily examined the idiosyncrasies of primary school children, and the issues of child personality types.

== The decades following World War II ==
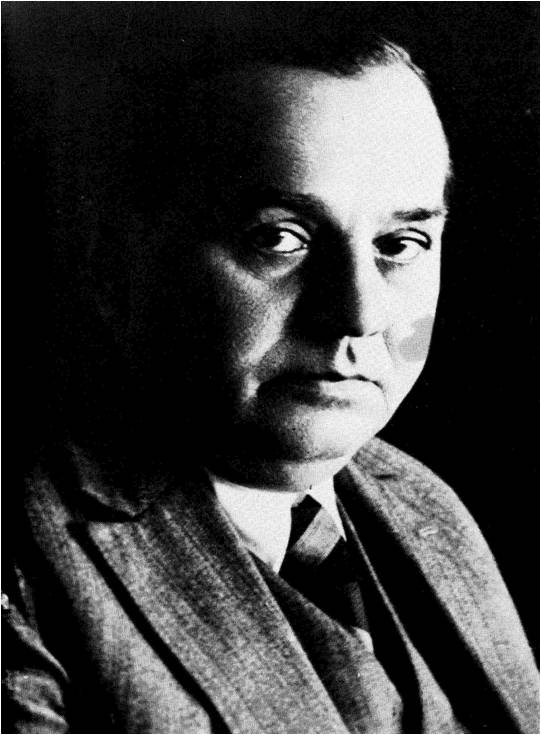
Béla Tettamanti (1884–1959)

Following the retirement of Cecil Bognár, the Institute of Psychology was incorporated into the Institute of Education and Psychology, in the academic year of 1950-1951. It was led by the university's former Privatdocent, Béla Tettamanti (1884–1959).

The amount of Psychology in the curriculum was reduced in the 1950s, mainly due to political reasons. It was taught at a rate of merely two lectures per week, and only the study of General Psychology was allowed. This was due to the influence of high Party echelons, who disapproved of Psychology. Psychology, together with Sociology, was claimed to be seditionary and counter-ideological, and was generally thought of as a media of bourgeois ideology. Thus, under the leadership of Béla Tettamanti, the only possible approach for the Institute was to mimic the Soviet example, and teach in accordance with the ideology prescribed by Karl Marx, Friedrich Engels, Vladimir Lenin and Joseph Stalin.

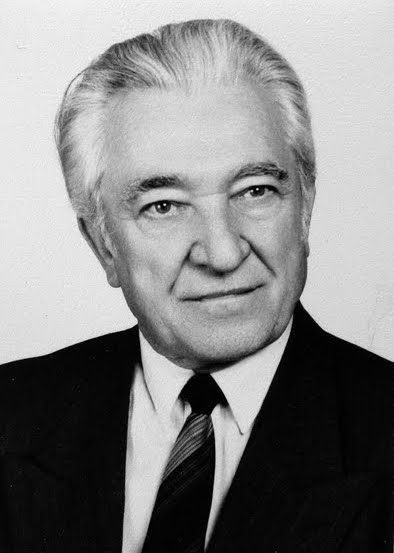
Lajos Duró leadership (1970–1990)

In 1959, Béla Tettamanti was replaced by the new director of the Institute of Education and Psychology, György Ágoston. Ágoston presented the Marxist pedagogy, nearly eliminated the teaching of mainstream psychology. György Ágoston directed the Institute of Education and Psychology from 1959 to 1970 and the Department of Education between 1970 and 1. January 1990.

== The restitution of psychology ==
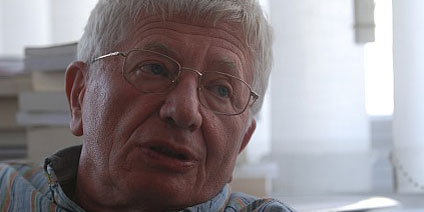
Ferenc Erős leadership 1992–1994

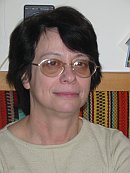
Zsuzsanna Vajda leadership 1994–2005

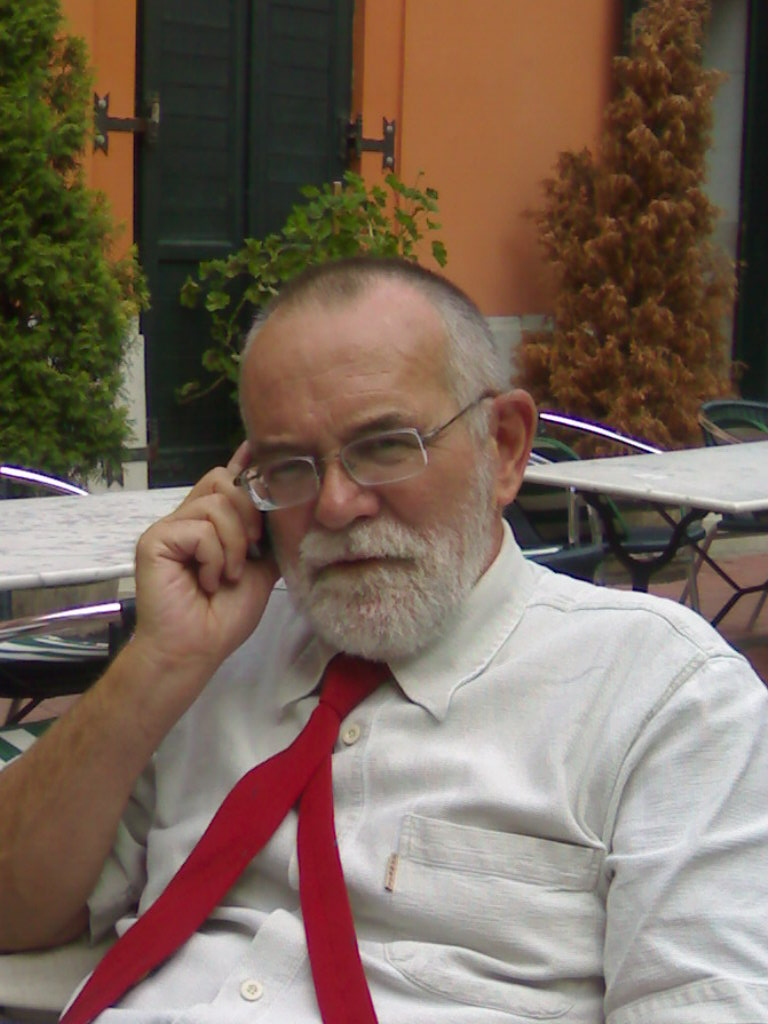
Csaba Pléh MTA, BME

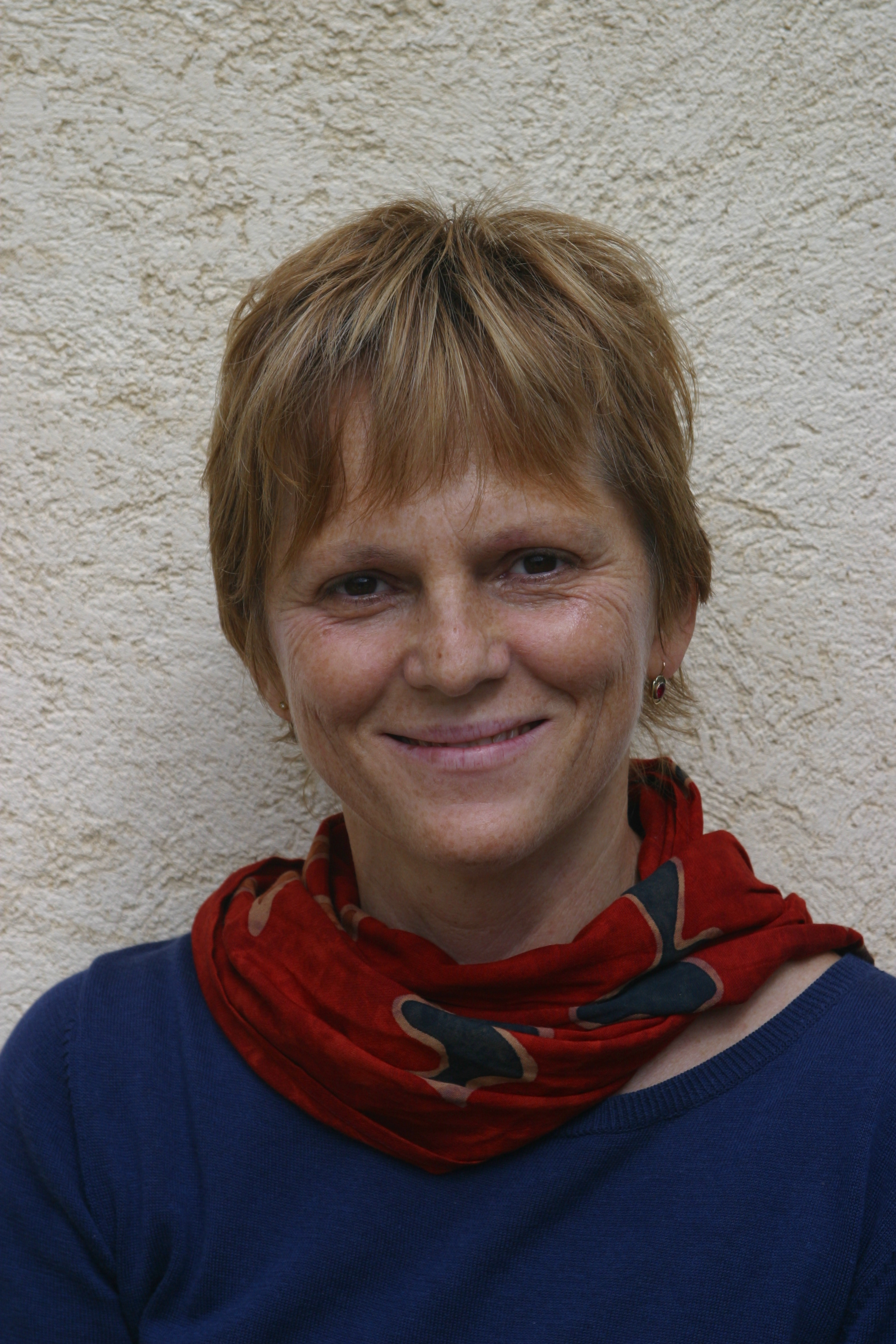
Ágnes Szokolszky Director of Institute of Psychology

The Department of Psychology became independent from other disciplines in 1970, under the leadership of Lajos Dúró, until 1990. During that period, research and tuition was mainly focused on Educational and Developmental Psychology.

In the early 1990s, the Faculty of Arts of the József Attila University of Sciences called for the reorganization of its departments as institutes. As a result, the Department of Education and the Department of Psychology were merged as the Institute of Education and Psychology.

Under Vajda Zsuzsanna's leadership, Psychology was made available as a major from the academic year 1996/1997; initially under the aegis of the Institute of Psychology (director: Zoltán Kovács) of the Kossuth Lajos University of Sciences (now University of Debrecen).

The founding father of the independent Psychology major, available from the turn of the millennium, is Professor Csaba Pléh, member of the Hungarian Academy of Sciences, who organized the Cognitive Science Group at the Department of Psychology, and in 1999, started the Cognitive Science and Neuropsychology Program of Szeged, or in short, the Cognitive Program. He laid the foundation for a professional psychology training course at the University of Szeged. The university's Medical Faculty and the Cognitive Science Group, led by Csaba Pléh, organized the VIII. Conference of the Hungarian Cognitive Science Association (MAKOG), titled The Development and Disorders of Cognitive Functions for 4–6 February 2000 in Szeged.

From 1 September 1999, the independent Department of Psychology functioned as an independent department at the József Attila University of Sciences (now University of Szeged).

Following previous changes to Psychology tuition and research in Szeged, Psychology training is again conducted within the Institute of Psychology. The Head of the Institute – and formerly Head of the Department of Psychology – is Associate Professor Ágnes Szokolszky.

In the summer of 2008, the Institute was moved to a new location, into a recently renovated wing of the Faculty of Arts. Currently there are three research laboratories on the premises:

- The Kardos Lajos Laboratory of Cognitive Sciences
- The Grastyán Endre EEG Laboratory
- Mérei Ferenc Behavior Analysis Laboratory (a reference laboratory of Noldus Information Technology)

== The Institute of Psychology today ==
István Winkler is Professor of Psychology at Institute of Psychology, University of Szeged from 2008. He's the Head of the Department of General Psychology, Institute for Psychology, Hungarian Academy of Sciences.

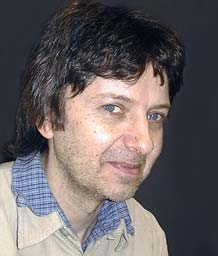
István Winkler (1958-)

The institute has strong ties to the international Psychology mainstream, as is proven by the lectures given by visiting professors and the large number of students spending months at foreign universities on Erasmus grants.

== Present-day affiliations ==
=== Renowned guest lecturers in recent years ===
- Alan Baddeley (Bristol): Human Memory
- Csibra Gergely (London): Cognition of Newborns
- Csányi Vilmos (Eötvös Lóránd University): Human Ethology
- Kovács Gyula: Neurobiology and Computational Bases
- Kovács Ilona, Káldy Zsuzsanna (New Jersey): The Development of Perception
- Csibra Gergely: The Cognitive View of Counting
- Pléh Csaba: The Evolution of Cognition
- Kónya Anikó: Autobiographic Memory and Narration
- Ehmann Bea: Narrative Psychology
- Csépe Valéria: Language Usage, Language Disorder and the Neural Network
- Bánréti Zoltán (Linguistic Institute, Hungarian Academy of Sciences): Defective Grammatical Principles in Agrammatic Aphasia
- Winkler István (Psychology Institute, Hungarian Academy of Sciences): The Intelligent Basic Processes of Auditory Perception (Spring Semester, 2005)
- Fiser József (Dept. of Brain and Cognitive Sciences, University of Rochester): The Computational Principles of Cognitive Neurosciences
- Mérő László: Economic Psychology

=== ERASMUS relations ===
- Universidad de Salamanca (Spain)
- University of Klagenfurt (Austria)
- Bielefeld University (Germany)
- Martin-Luther-Universität Halle-Wittenberg, Institute of Psychology (Germany)
- Katholieke Universiteit Leuven, Faculty of Psychology and Pedagogy (Belgium)
- University of Portsmouth, Department of Psychology (Great Britain)
- Aalborg Universitet, Department of Communication, Psychology (Denmark)
- University of Helsinki (Finland)
- Luleå Tekniska Universitet (Sweden)
- Abant Izzet Baysal University (Turkey)

=== Cooperation with foreign and Hungarian universities ===
- Georgetown University (Washington, D.C.)
- University of Connecticut
- Harvard University, Harvard Medical School (Boston)
- University of Reims Champagne-Ardenne (Applied Psychology Lab)
- Budapest University of Technology and Economics, Department of Cognitive Science
- University of Pécs, Evolutionary Psychology Group
- Hungarian Academy of Sciences, Research Institute for Psychology

== Gallery ==
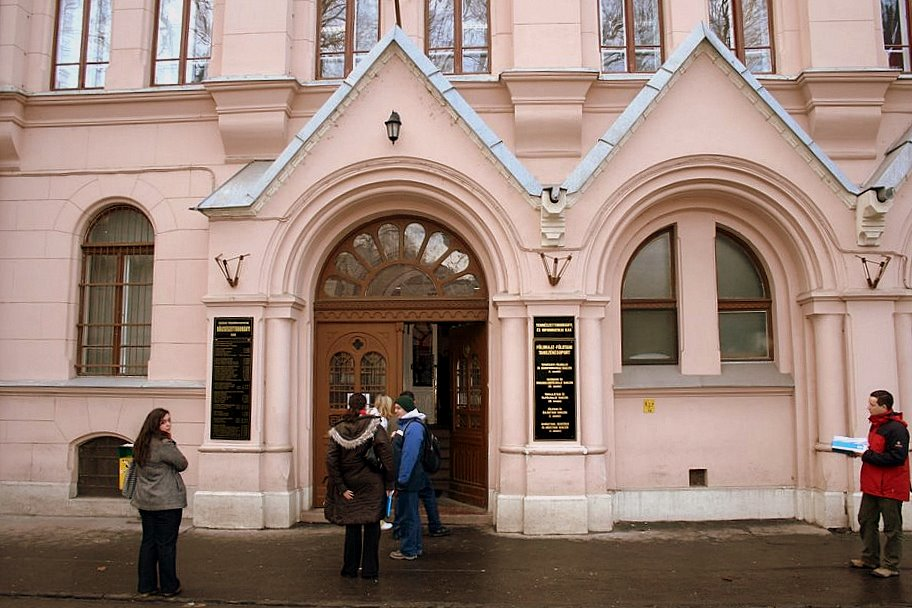
Entrance of the Faculty of Arts, University of Szeged

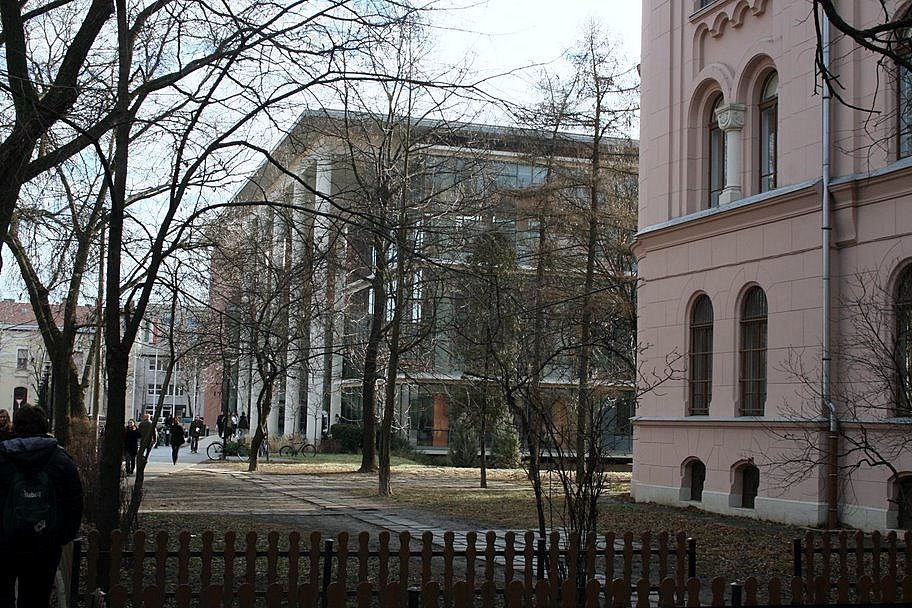
The Faculty of Arts, Szeged University and the József Attila Educational and Information Center Together

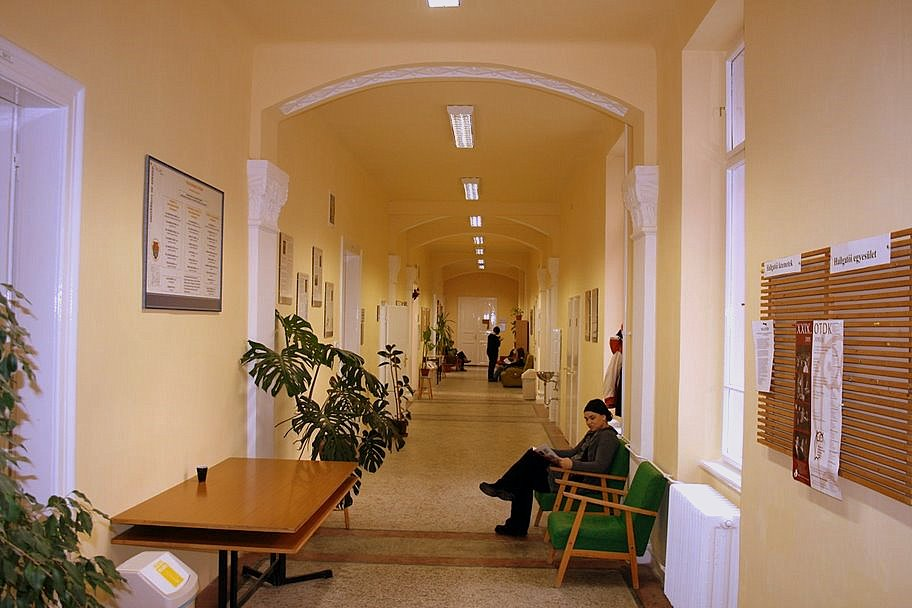
Institute of Psychology, Szeged University

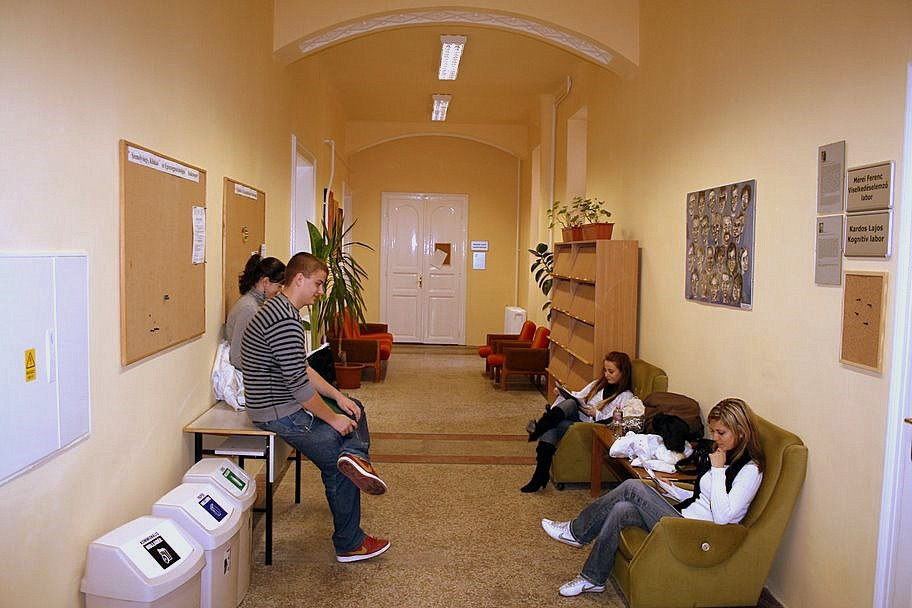
Institute of Psychology, Szeged University

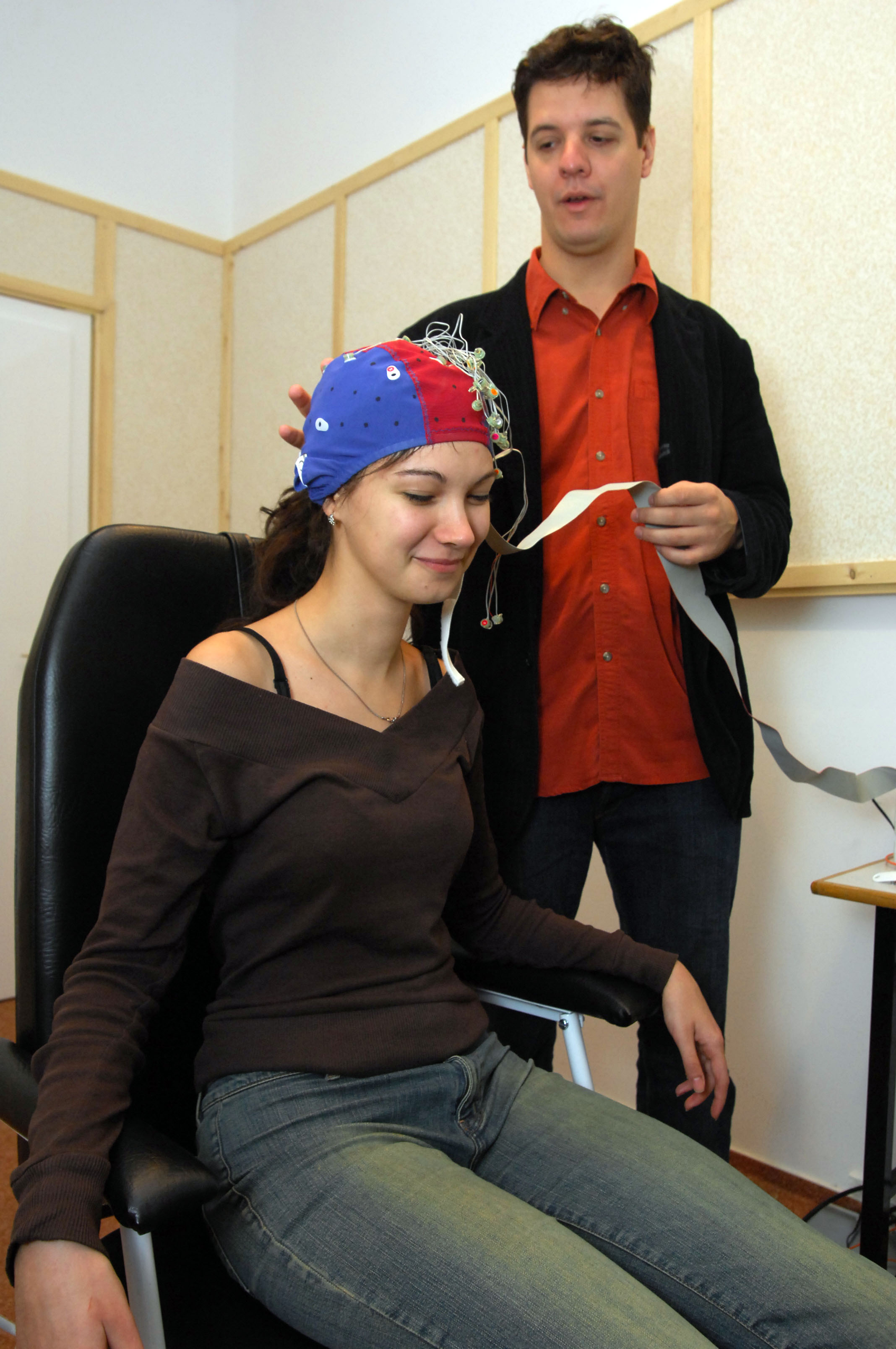
The Grastyán Endre EEG Laboratory

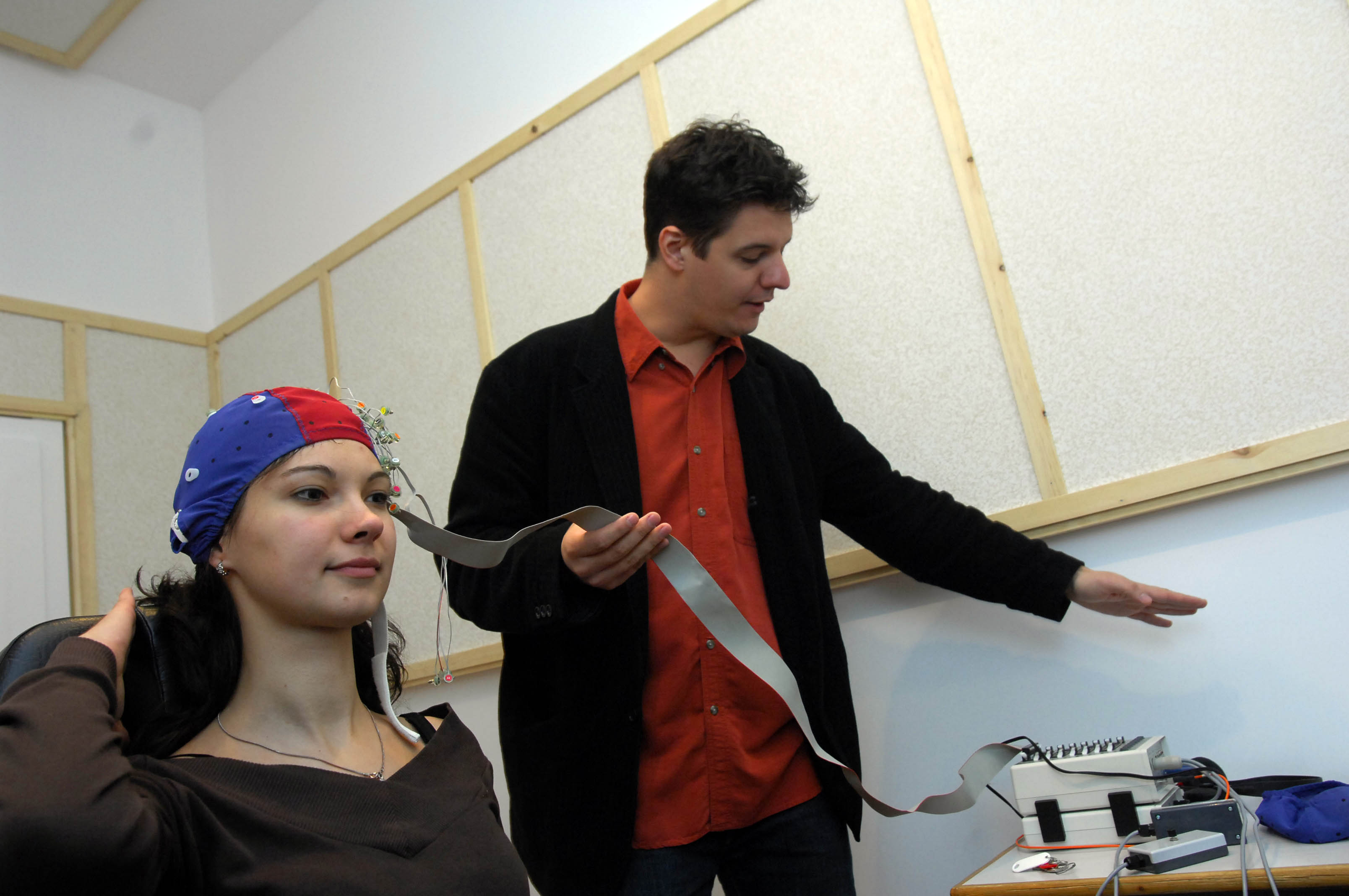
The Grastyán Endre EEG Laboratory

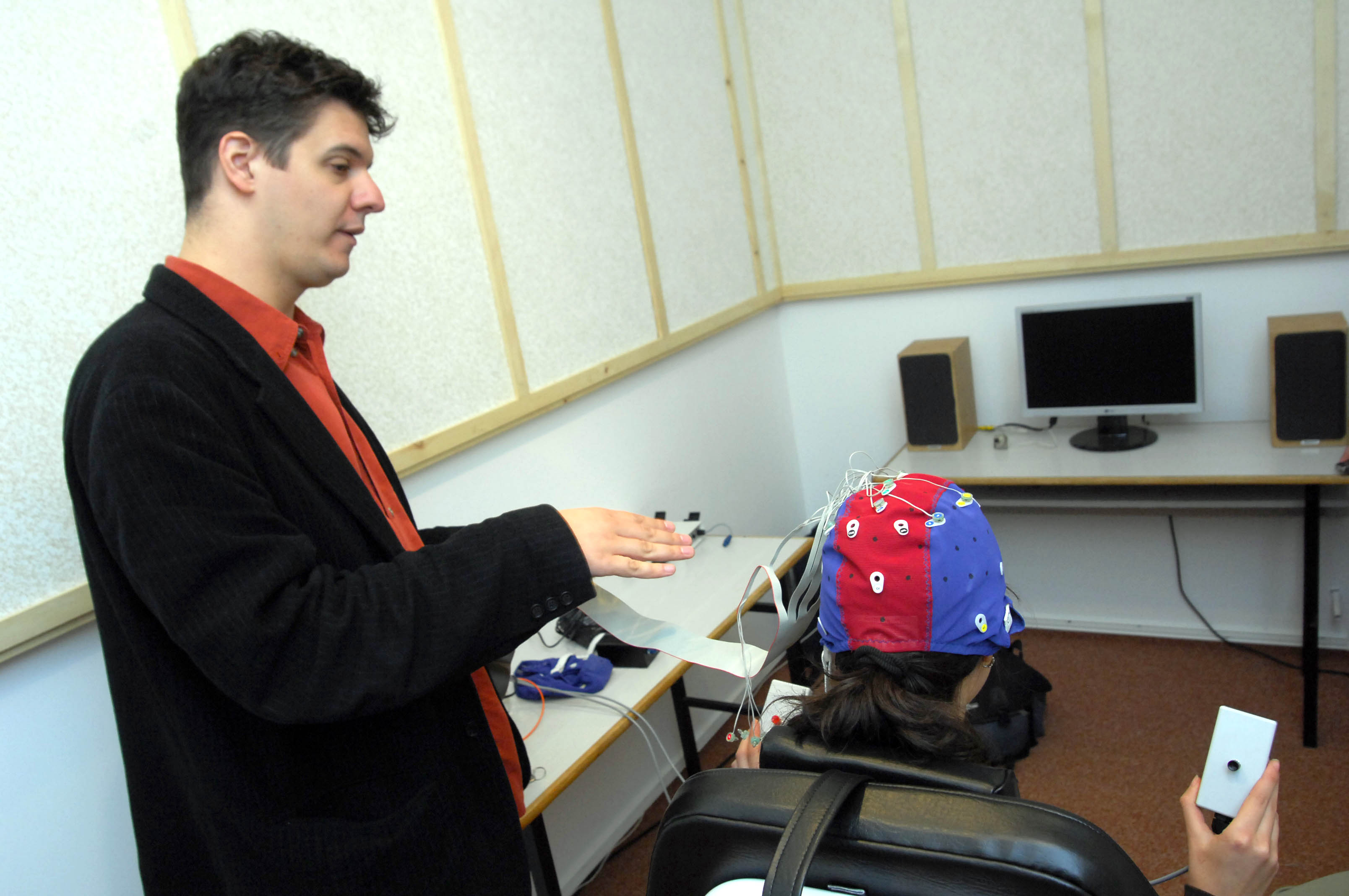
The Grastyán Endre EEG Laboratory

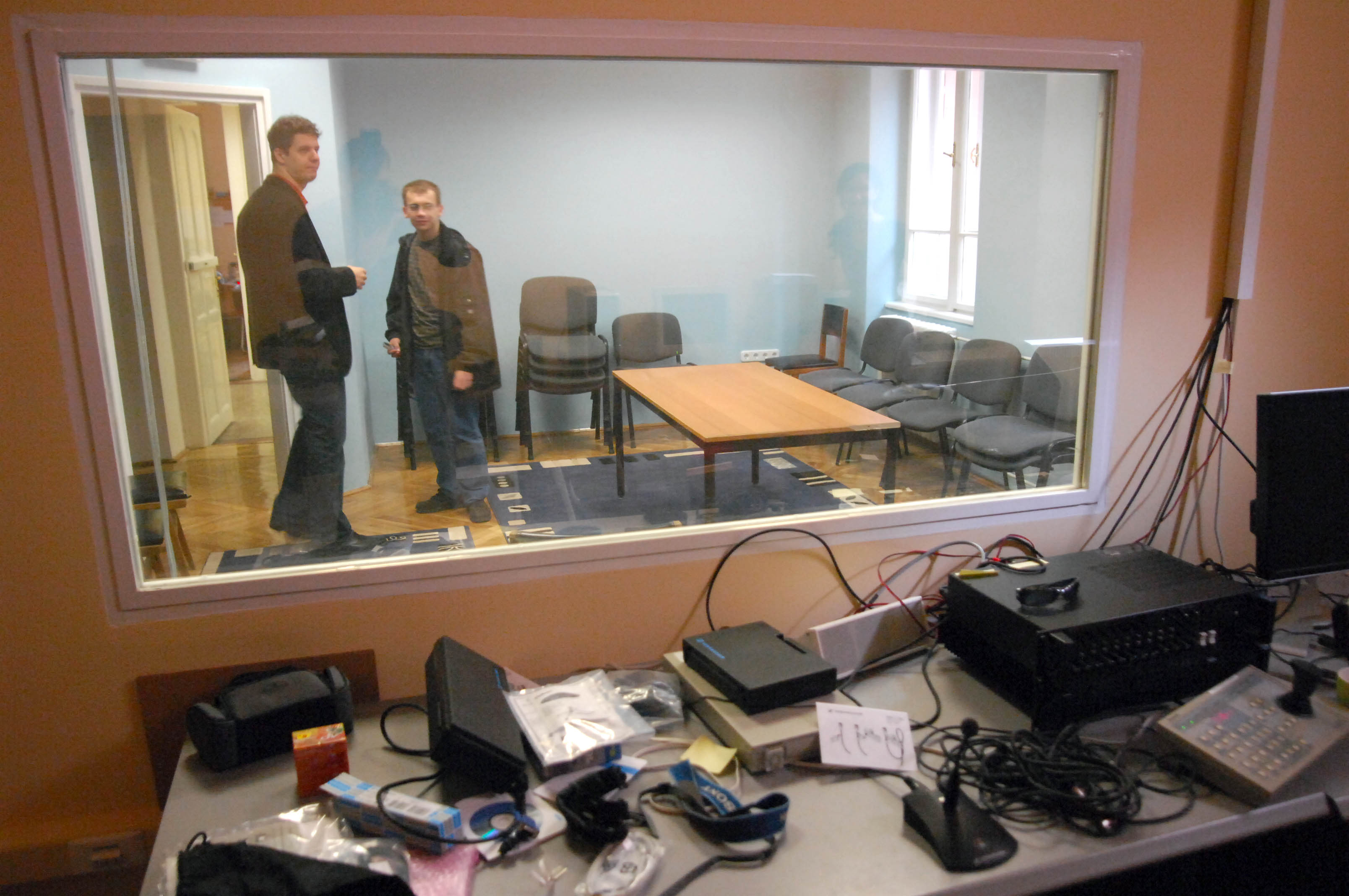
Mérei Ferenc Behavior Analysis Laboratory (a reference laboratory of Noldus Information Technology)

== See also ==
- Cognitive Science and Neuropsychology Program of Szeged
- Beat induction
