= Hildebrand Dezső Várkonyi =

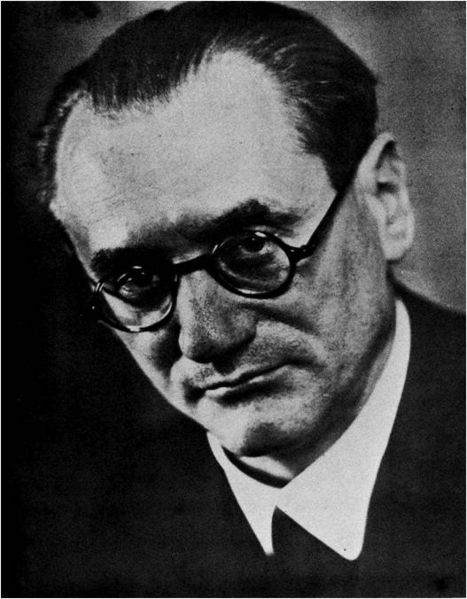
- The psychologist's pensioner age portrait
- Born: Dezső Várkonyi; 3 August 1888; Kéménd, Austria-Hungary
- Died: 20 May 1971 (aged 82); Budapest, People's Republic of Hungary
- Education: Sorbonne; University of Budapest
- Occupation: psychologist
- Spouse: Piroska Kisfaludy
- Writing career
- Language: Hungarian
- Period: Franz Joseph University, Szeged (1929-40)

Hildebrand Dezső Várkonyi (3 August 1888 – 20 May 1971) was a monk and a teacher of the Bencés order. Várkonyi was also a respected and well-known Hungarian philosopher, pedagogue and psychologist.

He was elected a private teacher at the Magyar Királyi Szent Erzsébet Tudományegyetem (Hungarian Royal Saint Elisabeth University) in Pécs. Between 1929 and 1940, he became the head of the Pedagogical and Psychological Institute at the University of Szeged. From 1940, Várkonyi was a professor in Kolozsvár and later in Budapest.

== Career ==
Várkonyi pursued his academic studies at The Teacher Training College of Bencés Abbey in Pannonhalma between 1906 and 1911 and graduated as a secondary school teacher (qualification). He completed his doctoral studies at the University of Budapest in 1913 and became a private teacher at the University of Pécs. Between 1928 and 1929, he was on a study tour at the Sorbonne in Paris.

Várkonyi was promoted to a university professor on 27 December 1929, and from this time, he was the Head of Pedagogical and Psychological Institution at Ferenc József University in Szeged, where he held the Dean's Office for years. Between 1930 and 1940, Paul Schiller Harkai, László Tihamér Kiss, Hildebrand Dezső Várkonyi, and Ferenc Mérei (he did so after 1945) were in Hungary, Jean Piaget's theories of psychological popularizers.

On 19 October 1940, Várkonyi moved to Kolozsvár to teach at the Hungarian Royal Franz Joseph University, which had just then been reorganised. In Kolozsvár, he was the Head of Psychological Institution for 7 semesters. Várkonyi fled to Budapest towards the end of the Second World War. In 1947, he left the Bencés Order because he started a family. He acquired a degree of Academy of Sciences in 1952, following the new academic system based on the Soviet model. He was a professor at the University of Budapest until his retirement in 1954.

== Work ==
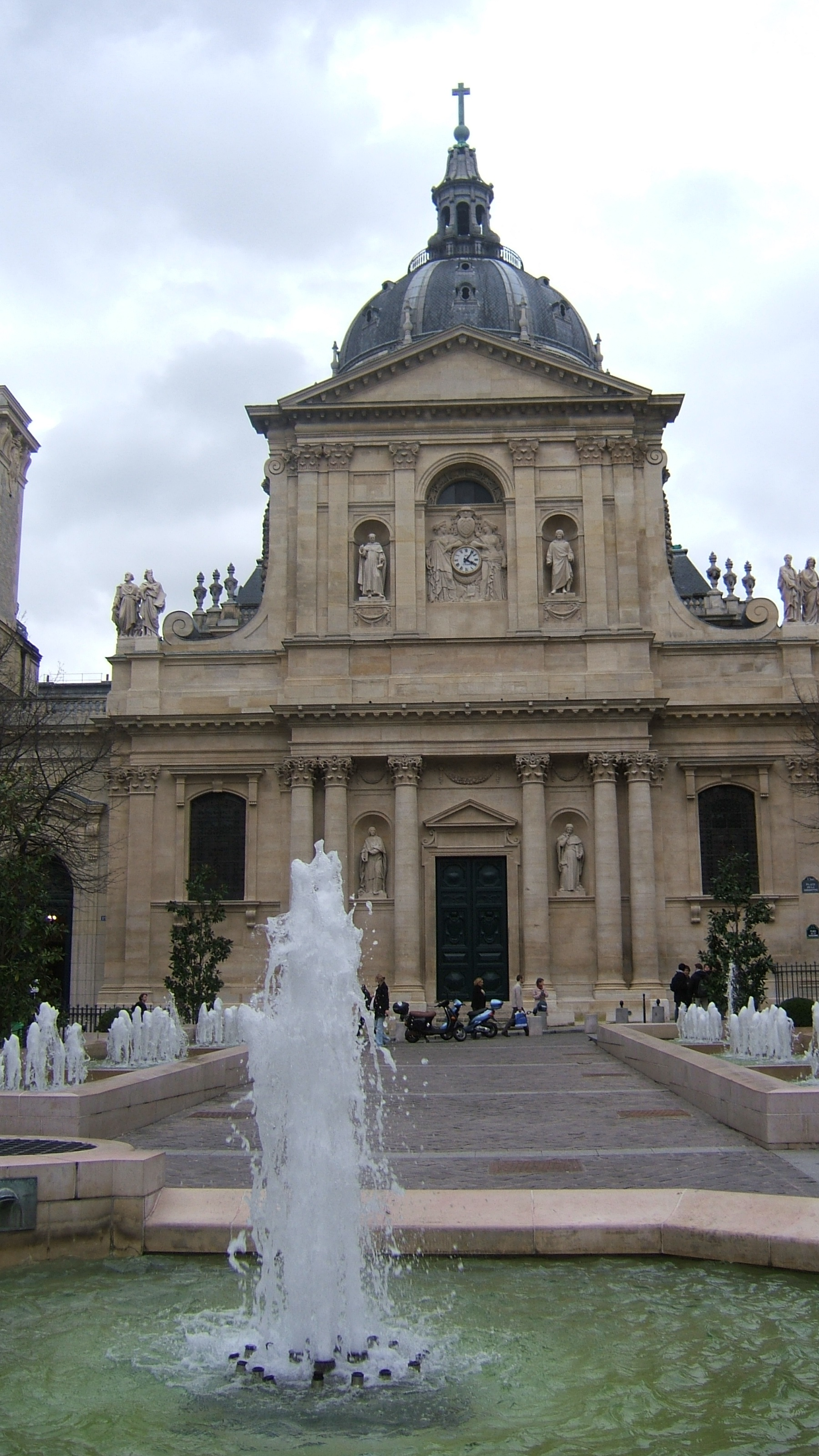
Sorbonne, Paris

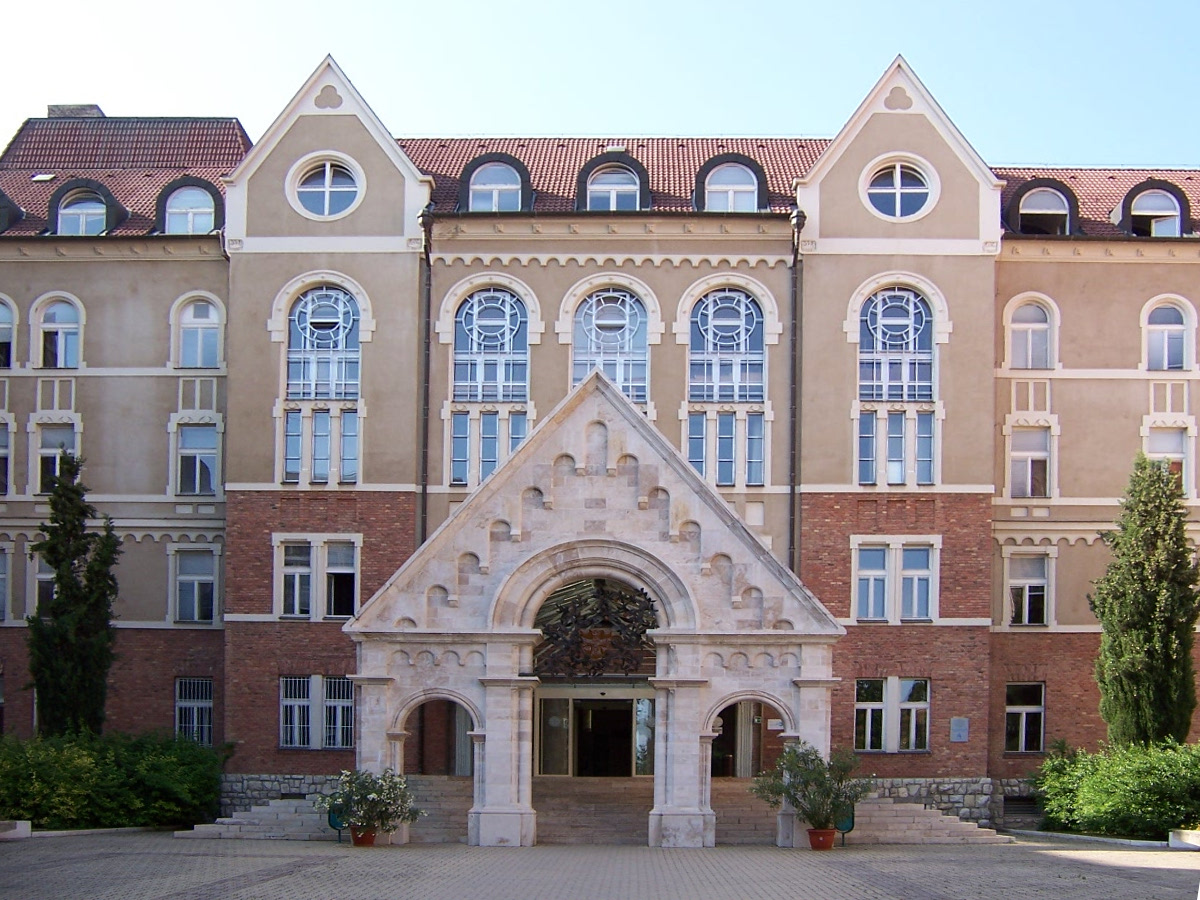
St. Elisabeth University, Pécs

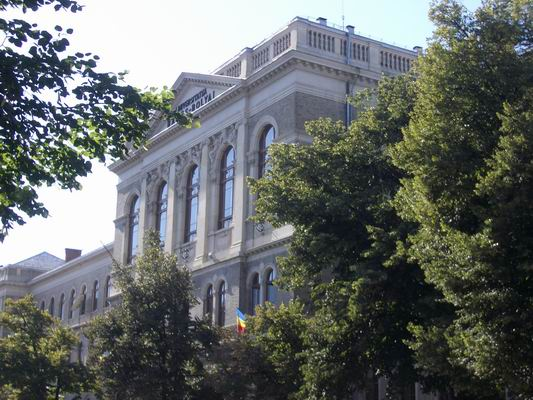
Babeş-Bolyai University was the Franz Joseph University during World War II, in Cluj-Napoca

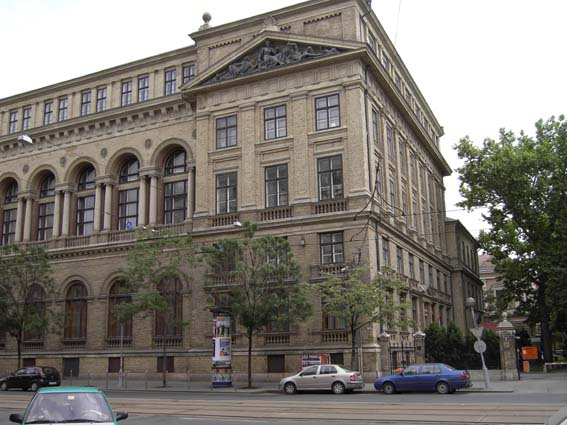
Eötvös Loránd University, Budapest

"I do not doubt that it is humanity again after the big crises of our age, the ghost and truth will yearn and after the treasures of the soul, than himself, Pascal and his age."

Besides being a teacher, Várkonyi was a researcher of philosophy, pedagogy, psychology, and infant behaviourism. Among his well-known students were Viola Tomori and Béla Reitzer. Other famous Hungarians such as Miklós Radnóti, Gyula Ortutay and Dezső Baróti, who were impressed by Várkonyi's intellectuality, attended his lectures. Radnóti, for example, a famous Hungarian poet, was deeply influenced by Várkonyi's lectures on infant behaviourism. Later in his career, Radnóti discusses his gloomy childhood experience in his poems.

Várkonyi continued teaching at the University of Kolozsvár during the years of war. Várkonyi was a philosopher, psychologist, and pedagogue in one person. For him, philosophy was not only a discipline but a struggle for the answers to the ultimate questions of human existence.

== His recollection ==
In 1988, on the occasion of his 100th anniversary of his birth, the Institute of Psychology (Szeged) leader Lajos Duró and his colleagues published a memory volume in his honour and named a lecture hall after him. Várkonyi Hildebrand Dezső lecture hall is an integral part of the Institute of Psychology today.

In 2008, it was issued on the occasion of the 120th anniversary of his birth, the Várkonyi Hildebrand Dezső medallion, and it was handed over to those who are willing to make sacrifices for those who are involved in the research of educational psychology and its dissemination area.

== Studies (selection) ==
- A tudat fogalmáról. Filozófia-történeti és ismerettani tanulmány. Győr, 1912. (=From the concept of the consciousness. Philosophy story and knowledge doctrine study.)
- A tudati adottság filozófiája. Budapest, 1922. (=The philosophy of the consciousness conditions.)
- Aquinói Szent Tamás filozófiája. Budapest. 1923. (=St. Thomas Aquinas's philosophy.)
- Tér és térszemlélet. Pécs, 1925. (=Space and space-perception.)
- A pszichológia alapvetése. Pécs, 1926. (The establishment of the psychology.)
- Az indukció filozófiája. Pécs, 1927. (=The philosophy of the induction.)
- A lélektan mai állása. Budapest, 1928. (=The today's position of the psychology.)
- Intelligencia (értelem). [Lexikon szócikk.] In Magyar pedagógiai lexikon I. köt. – Bp.: Révai, 1933. 914–915. hasáb. (=Intelligence (sense). [Encyclopaedia dictionary entry.] In the Hungarian pedagogic encyclopaedia)
- Tehetség, tehetségesség. [Lexikon szócikk.] In: Magyar pedagógiai lexikon II. köt. – Bp. : Révai, 1934. 784–785. hasáb. (=Talent, talented. [Encyclopaedia dictionary entry.] In: Hungarian pedagogic encyclopaedia.)
- Tehetségesek iskolái. [Lexikon szócikk.] = Magyar pedagógiai lexikon II. köt. – Bp. : Révai, 1934. 785–786. hasáb. (The schools of talented ones. [=Encyclopaedia dictionary entry.] = Hungarian pedagogic encyclopaedia.)
- A cselekvő iskola lélektani alapja. A Cselekvés Iskolája, Szeged, 3. évf. (1934–35) 101. o. (=The psychological basis of the acting school. The school of the act.)
- A kiválasztás és értelmességvizsgálat újabb kérdése. Szeged, 1936. (=The newer question of the selection and an intelligence examination.)
- Bevezetés a neveléslélektanba. Budapest, 1937. (=Introduction into the educational psychology.)
- A nevelés néhány alapelve. Kecskemét, 1939. (=Some basic principles of the upbringing.)
- Védekező magatartások a gyermekkorban. A Cselekvés Iskolája, Szeged, 1939–40. (=Defensive behaviours in the childhood. )
- Fejezetek a serdülés és ifjúkor lélektanából : Lényegszemlélet : Második közlemény. A Cselekvés iskolája, Szeged, [Ablaka ny.] 9. tanév 1940–41. 1–4. sz. (=Chapters from the psychology of the puberty and youth : Essence view : The second is communication. The school of the act.)
- A gyermek testi és lelki fejlődése. Budapest, 1942. (=The child bodily and his spiritual growth.)
- A lelki élet zavarai. Budapest, 1943. (=The disturbances of the spiritual life.)
- Válogatott pedagógiai tanulmányok. Szerző: Makarenko. Ford Szöllősy Klára. Szerk. és az előszót írta Várkonyi H. Dezső egyetemi tanár. Budapest : Új Magyar Könyvkiadó N. V., 1948. pp. 322 (változatlan utánnyomás 1949, 1950.) (=Chosen pedagogic studies.)
- Ranschburg Pál és a magyar gyógypedagógia. Gyógypedagógia, 1960. (=Pál Ranschburg and the Hungarian remedial education. Remedial education.)
- Felfogás és absztrakció. In: Tanítóképző Intézetek Tudományos Közleményei. 6. Debrecen, 1969. (=Notion and abstraction.)
- Naplótöredékek. Budapest, 1973. (=Diary fractions.)

== Literature (selection) ==
- Magyar Irodalmi lexikon. 3. köt. Budapest, 1965. (=Hungarian literary encyclopaedia.)
- Bardócz András: Várkonyi Hildebrand Dezső tudományos közleményeinek és kéziratainak bibliográfiája. Budapest, Magyar Padagógiai Társaság, 1979. 38 p. (=András Bardócz: Dezső Hildebrand Várkonyi's bibliography of scientific communications and his manuscripts.)
- Szántó Károly: Várkonyi Hildebrand Dezső életútja és munkássága. Pedagógiai Szemle, 1984. (=Károly Szántó: Dezső Hildebrand Várkonyi's path of life and his working class.
- Várkonyi Hildebrand Dezső emlékkötet / szerk. Zakar András. Szeged, 1988. (Acta Universitatis Szegediensis de Attila József Nominatae. Sectio Paedagogica et Psychologica, 0324-7260; 30.) (=Dezső Hildebrand Várkonyi's memory volume)

== Scientific function ==
- Hungarian Psychological Review (his editor, 1934–1939)

== Social membership ==
- Hungarian Pedagogic Company
- Hungarian Psychological Company (president, 1940–1947)
- Paedology company (co-chairman)

== See also ==
- Institute of Psychology (Szeged)
