= Pál Harkai Schiller =

Pál Harkai Schiller (4 November 1908 in Budapest – 1949 in United States), also known as Paul von Schiller, was a Hungarian philosopher and psychologist. In 1936, he organized the Psychological Institute at Budapest University.

== Career ==
He acquired a doctorate in philosophy at Faculty of Humanities of Budapest University in 1930. Obtained research experiences in Ranschburg Pál Budapest Institute. Obtained a university private tutor qualification at Budapest University in 1936, he went to the University of Berlin to get some experience in the institution of the Gestalt psychology Wolfgang Köhler.

In 1936 he graduated as a private teacher at Budapest University and organized Psychological Institute. Hungarian Psychological Association organized his practical psychological department. He edited book series named Psychological Studies which was published by Psychological Institute. Pál Schiller Harkai valuable input to his studies by Wolfgang Köhler, Jean Piaget and Karl Bühler teachings. Between 1930 and 1940 Pál Schiller Harkai, Ferenc Mérei, László Tihamér Kiss and Hildebrand Dezső Várkonyi was in Hungary Jean Piaget's theories of psychological popularizers.

He took part in the establishing of Aptitude-Institute for Soldier and helped to equip the psychotechnological station of MÁV and some other companies. He emigrated in 1947 into the United States of America. He perished in a ski accident. More of his posthumous studies appeared, between anything else single Alpha name from the drawing experiments of a female carried out with a chimpanzee, that the drawing development induced many debates his biological bases.

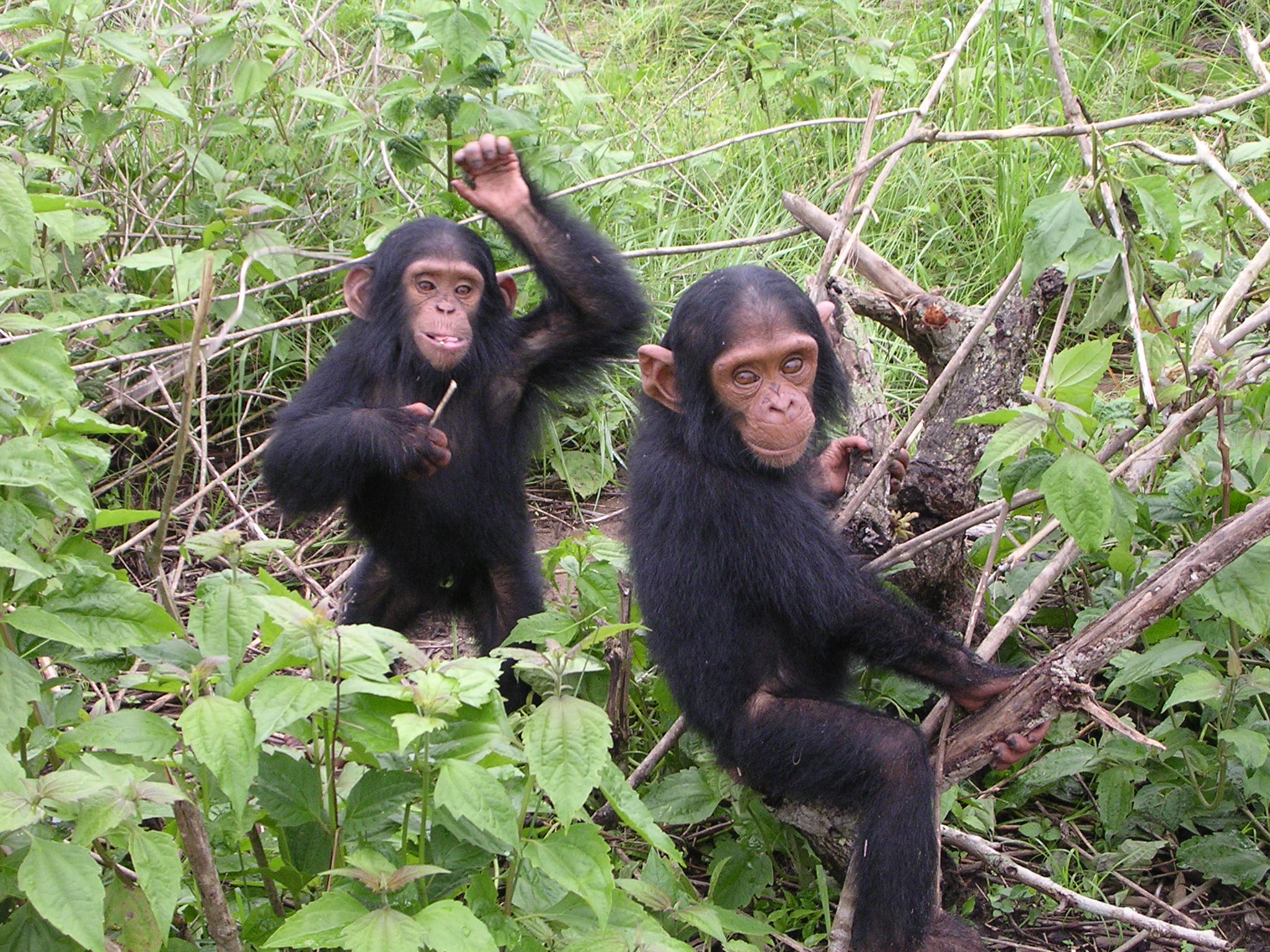
Young chimpanzees are playing.

== Legacy ==
- One of the Semmelweis University Library takes Pál Schiller Harkai name.

== Memberships ==
- Hungarian Psychological Association

== Works ==
- A lélektani kategóriák rendszerének kialakulása. Budapest, 1930. p. 107. (The conformation of psychological categories' systems.)
- Pszichológia és emberismeret: Bevezetés a pszichológiába és a pszichotechnikába. Budapest, 1934. p. 146. (Psychology and anthropology: Introduction to psychology and psychotechnology.)
- Dohányzási szokások Budapesten: Gazdaságpszichológiai tanulmány. Budapest, 1938. p. 78. (Smoking habits in Budapest: Economic psychological study.)
- Értelempróbák szerkesztése. (Komjáthy Zoltánnal) Magyar Pszichológiai Szemle, 1938. (Editing of intelligence probes -with Zoltán Komjáthy)
- A cselekvéstan alaptételei. A cselekvés motivációs elmélete. In Athenaeum, 1939. (Fundamentals of Action's science. The theory of action's motivation.)
- A lélektan feladata. (The function of psyche.) Budapest, 1940. (It was also published in 2002 with the epilogue of Csaba Pléh)
- Bevezetés a lélektanba : A cselekvés elemzése. Budapest, 1944. (Introduction to psychology: The assay of action.)
- Lélektani tanulmányok: Jelentés a Kir. Magy. Pázmány Péter Tudományegyetem Lélektani Intézetéből / Kornis Gyula és Brandenstein Béla közreműködésével szerk. Harkai Schiller Pál, Budapest, 1937–1947. (Psychological studies: Report from the Psychological Institute of the Kir. Magy. Pázmány Péter University / with the contribution of Gyula Kornis and Béla Brandenstein)
- Paul Ranschburg: 1870–1945. Ithaca, N.Y., Cornell Univ. 1947. From The American Journal of Psychology . pp. 444–446.
- A Hungarian survey on sympathetic attitudes. (Mexico, 1947)

== Sources ==
- Pedagógiai Lexikon. Főszerk. Báthory Zoltán, Falus Iván. 1. köt. Budapest : Keraban Könyvkiadó, 1997. Harkai Schiller Pál lásd. 644. p.
- Magyar Életrajzi Lexikon 1000–1990. Javított, átdolgozott kiadás. Főszerkesztő: Kenyeres Ágnes. HTML változat: Magyar Elektronikus Könyvtár. Harkai Schiller Pál.
