= István Winkler =

Hungarian psychologist (born 1958)

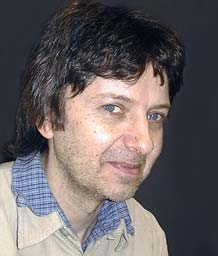
- Born: February 8, 1958 (age 68); Budapest, Hungary
- Awards: Annual Award for Best PhD Thesis (University of Helsinki, 1994); Samuel Sutton Award for Distinguished Contribution to Human ERPs and Cognition (Samuel Sutton Foundation, 1995); Kardos Lajos Commemorative Medal (Institute for Psychology, Hungarian Academy of Sciences, 2004)
- Scientific career
- Fields: perception memory event-related brain potentials
- Workplaces: Budapest University of Technology and Economics; Eötvös Loránd University; Institute for Psychology of the Hungarian Academy of Sciences; University of Helsinki; University of Szeged; Institute of Psychology, Szeged

István Winkler (born 8 February 1958) is a Hungarian psychologist. He is Scientific Advisor (2005–present) and Head of the Department of General Psychology (2000–present) at the Institute for Psychology of the Hungarian Academy of Sciences and Professor of the Institute of Psychology, Szeged, since 2008.

His fields of research are perception, memory and event-related brain potentials.

== Biography ==
Winkler was born in Budapest and graduated from the Radnóti Miklós Training High School of the Eötvös Loránd University. He then studied at the Budapest University of Technology and Economics, Faculty of Electrical Engineering, and graduated in 1981. From 1980, he studied psychology at the Faculty of Humanities of the Eötvös Loránd University, and went on to attain a diploma in psychology in 1985.

Having made a commitment to psychology, he entered the psychology PhD program at the University of Helsinki in 1990, and received his PhD degree there, in 1993. In 1996, he was qualified as a Docent at the University of Helsinki. He defended his DSc dissertation in Budapest, at the Hungarian Academy of Sciences, in 2005. He has been a professor at the Institute of Psychology, Szeged, since 2008.

He has published over 100 papers in leading psychophysiological journals (such as the European Journal of Neuroscience, Journal of Psychophysiology, Journal of Cognitive Neuroscience, Cognitive Brain Research and Proceedings of the National Academy of Sciences, United States). He is an internationally well-known researcher of auditory electrophysiology with widespread research collaborations both with Hungarian and foreign researchers.

In 2009, together with Henkjan Honing, he showed that newborn infants already have a sense of rhythm. These results suggest that innate perceptual processes support early preference for music and fast acquisition of communications skills.

== Selected studies ==
=== In Hungarian ===
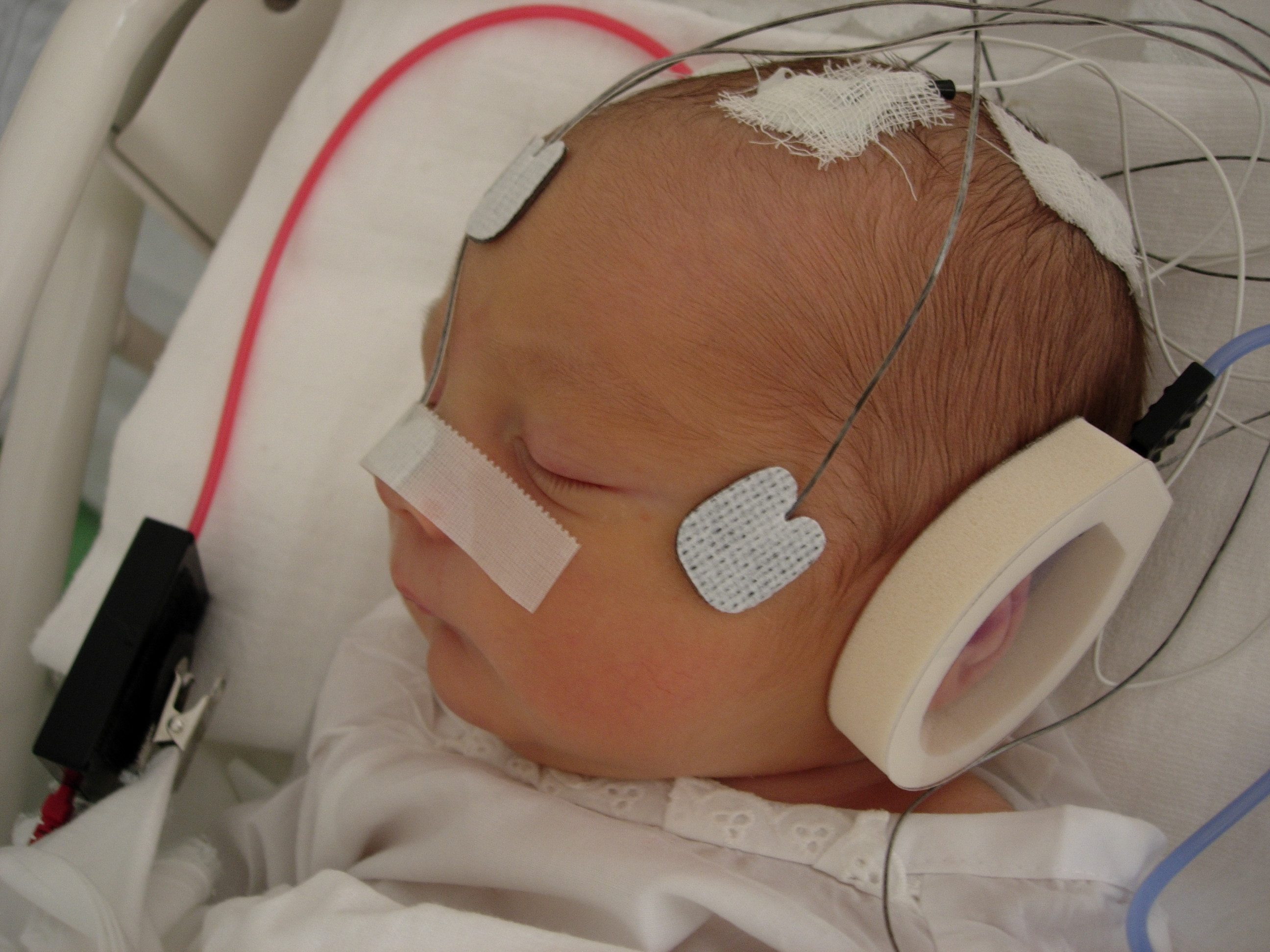
Sleeping newborn infant participating in the experiment, the mother of the baby was present during the procedure

- Winkler, I. & Czigler I. (1997). "Kognitív pszichofiziológia: Agyi elektromos változások és humán megismerési folyamatok". Magyar Tudomány, 4. (Cognitive psychophysiology: brain responses and human cognitive processes)
- Czigler, I. & Winkler, I. (1998). "Független modulok és feldolgozási függőség: alulnézet". In: László, L. (Ed.), Élettörténet és megismerés. (pp. 22–32). Budapest: Scientia Humana. (Independent modules and processing dependency: bottom-view)
- Winkler, I. et al. (2002). "Automatikus válaszdetekció a látásban". In: Czigler, I., Halázs, L. & Marton, M. (Eds.). Az általánostól a különösig (pp. 132–148). Budapest: Gondolat. ISBN 963-9450-16-2 (Automatic response detection in vision)
- Winkler, I. Érzékelés, észlelés : "Hangok szervezése és leképezése". In: Pléh, Csaba et al. (Ed.) Kognitív idegtudomány. (2003) Budapest : Osiris. ISBN 963-389-313-5 (Sensation, perception: the structuring and mapping of sounds)
- Winkler, I. et al. (2009). "Már az újszülötteknek is van ritmusérzékük c. cikkének visszhangja". (reflections on his article "Newborn infants detect the beat in music")

=== In English ===
- István Winkler’s articles published in English
- Winkler, I., Cowan, N., Csépe, V., Czigler, I. & Näätänen, R. (1996). "Interactions between transient and long-term auditory memory as reflected by the mismatch negativity". Journal of Cognitive Neuroscience, 8, 403–415.
- Winkler, I., Kujala, T., Tiitinen, H., Sivonen, P., Alku, P., Lehtokoski, A., Czigler, I., Csépe, V., Ilmoniemi, R.J. & Näätänen, R. (1999). "Brain responses reveal the learning of foreign language phonemes". Psychophysiology, 36, 638–642.
- Czigler, I., Balázs, L., & Winkler, I. (2002). "Memory-based detection of task-irrelevant visual changes". Psychophysiology, 39, 869–873.
- Winkler, I., Kushnerenko, E., Horváth, J., Čeponienė, R., Fellman, V., Huotilainen, M., Näätänen, R., & Sussman, E. (2003). "Newborn infants can organize the auditory world". Proceedings of the National Academy of Sciences USA, 100, 1182–1185.
- Kushnerenko, E., Winkler, I., Horváth, J., Näätänen, R., Pavlov, I., Fellman, V., & Huotilainen, M. (2007). "Processing acoustic change and novelty in newborn infants". European Journal of Neuroscience, 26, 265–274.
- Winkler, I. (2007). "Interpreting the mismatch negativity (MMN)". Journal of Psychophysiology, 21, 60–69.
- Winkler, István; Háden, Gábor P.; Ladinig, Olivia; Sziller, István; Honing, Henkjan (17 February 2009). "Newborn infants detect the beat in music". Proceedings of the National Academy of Sciences. 106 (7): 2468–2471. Bibcode:2009PNAS..106.2468W. doi:10.1073/pnas.0809035106. PMC 2631079. PMID 19171894. S2CID 216051178.

== Society fellowships ==
- Member of the Society for Psychophysiological Research
- Member of the editorial board of Pszichológia, the journal of the Hungarian Academy of Sciences, Research Institute for Psychology

== Awards ==
- Annual Award for Best PhD Thesis (University of Helsinki, 1994)
- Samuel Sutton Award for Distinguished Contribution to Human ERPs and Cognition (Samuel Sutton Foundation, 1995)
- Kardos Lajos Commemorative Medal (Institute for Psychology, Hungarian Academy of Sciences, 2004)

== See also ==
- Beat induction
- Henkjan Honing
- Hungarian Academy of Sciences
- Institute of Psychology (Szeged)
