= János Szentágothai =

Hungarian politician and academic (1912–1994)

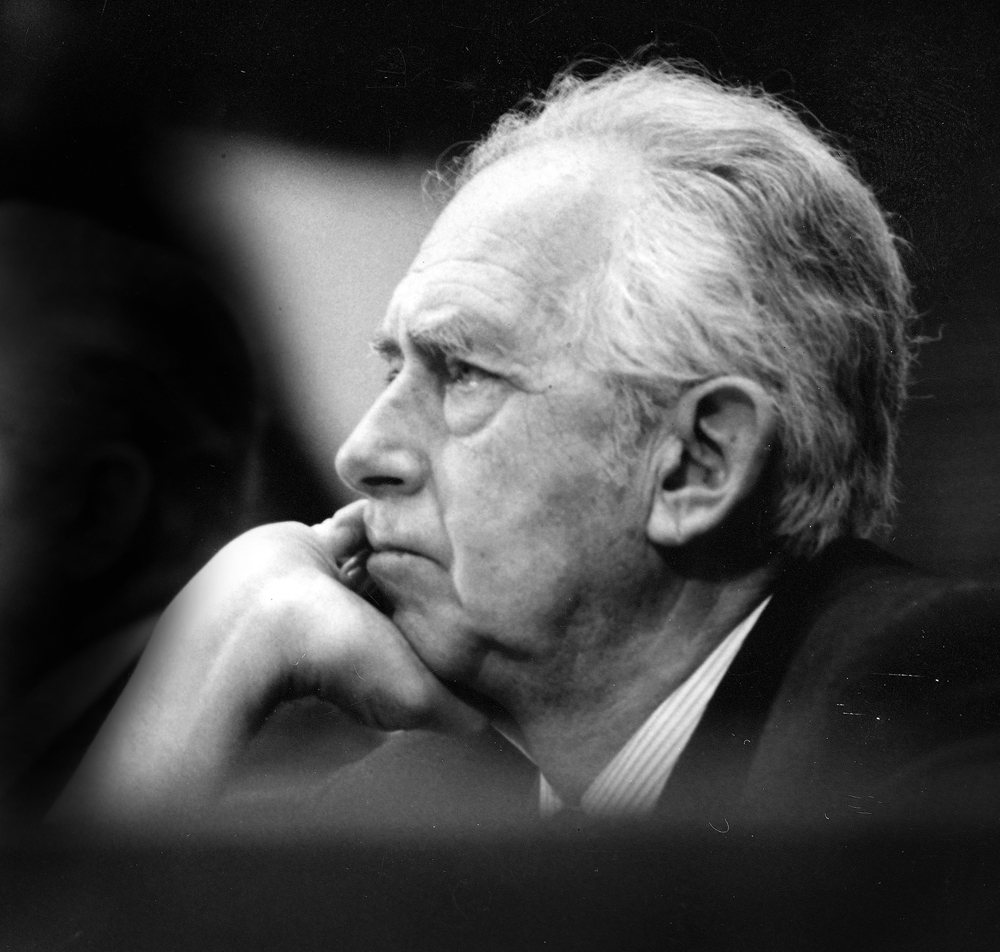
- János Szentágothai in 1981
- Born: 31 October 1912; Pestújhely,
- Died: 8 September 1994 (aged 81); Budapest
- Spouse: Alice Biberauer
- Children: Katalin; Klára; Mária Krisztina
- Scientific career
- Workplaces: Semmelweis University

János Szentágothai FRS (31 October 1912 – 8 September 1994) was a Kossuth Prize-winning Hungarian anatomist, Professor, Member of Parliament, and President of the Hungarian Academy of Sciences.His father was Antal Géza MD, great-grandfather was Alexander Lumniczer (whose brother-in-law was Schöpf-Merei Ágost). The general assembly of UNESCO decided the year 2012 to be dedicated to honour the 100th birthday of János Szentágothai.

== Biography ==
He was born as János Schimert, in Budapest in 1912, to Dr Gustav Schimert and Margit Antal, in a family of doctors. He was descended from Transylvanian Saxons on his father's side and Székely on his mother's side. He was admitted to the German grammar school in Budapest in 1930, and was admitted to the Peter Pázmány University Medical School. Four brothers also studied in the same place. Doctors was inaugurated in 1936.

== Family ==
On 7 June 1938 he married Alice Biberauer, who he met in the Pro Christo Student Association. They had three daughters, Catherine (1939), Clare (1941) and Maria Christina (1951), all three of whom entered the medical field. John Szentágothai four doctor's brother lived in the United States and Germany. In his free time with pleasure fumbling with in Révfülöp weekend on the same property with plants.

== Academic career ==
Schimert started his medical studies at the Budapest University Medical School in 1930, and was accepted in the first year by Professor Mihály Lenhossék as a research student in the Department of Anatomy. He received his MD in 1936 and continued to teach at Budapest, becoming Associate Professor in 1942. During the Second World War (karpaszományos) he was a physician, airman, and a prisoner of war. He returned in 1946. He then attended Pécs University Medical School, where he was later Head of the Anatomy Department. After the war, he resumed study of the vestibular system and dealt with the topic of neuroendocrinology. During his study at Pécs, he pursued innovative work in the field of neuroanatomy. In 1948 he was elected a corresponding member of the Hungarian Academy of Sciences. In 1961, he started the department of electron microscopy in brain research in Hungary.

In 1963, he returned to Budapest to lead the Semmelweis University School of Medicine Department of Anatomy. There he mainly addressed the cerebellum and functioning of the cerebral cortex. In addition, he performed experimental research on the spinal cord and brainstem reflex mechanisms. In 1967 he was elected a full member of the Hungarian Academy of Sciences. He headed the department until 1977, and in 1986 officially retired from teaching. Ferenc Kiss, famous for his work produced for the human anatomy atlas, drew his textbook, which was translated into thirteen languages and more than a hundred editions. He proclaimed that half the age of most of the people speaking the development of one and a half years of age, and it will need to communicate is the most important factor.

== Public career ==
In 1956 at Pécs, he was chairman of the Revolutionary Committee of Intellectuals. He did not return to public life until 1973, when he was elected vice-president of the Hungarian Academy of Sciences. Four years later he became its president and therefore left the position of University department head. In 1985, he entered parliament as a member of the Presidential Council of the Hungarian People's Republic. He was (later a member of its abolition), involved in the work of the Hungarian Democratic Forum during the transition. She was a member of the Foreign Affairs Committee. Szentágothai and his wife are buried in Budapest.

== Main works ==
- Eccles, John Carew, Masao Ito, and János Szentágothai. The cerebellum as a neuronal machine. New York: Springer-Verlag, 1967.
- Szentágothai, János. "The modular architectonic principle of neural centers." Reviews of Physiology, Biochemistry and Pharmacology, Volume 98. Springer Berlin Heidelberg, 1983. 11–61.
- Szentágothai, János. Hypothalamic control of the anterior pituitary: an experimental-morphological study. Akadémiai Kiadó, 1968.
- Arbib, Michael Anthony, Péter Érdi, and János Szentágothai. Neural organization: Structure, function, and dynamics. The MIT Press, 1998.
- Szentágothai, János. "Synaptology of the visual cortex." Visual Centers in the Brain. Springer Berlin Heidelberg, 1973. 269–324.

== Awards and recognition ==
- Kossuth Prize (1950)
- I state fee degree (1970) – achievements in the functional structure of the nervous system research.
- Honorary member of the American Association for Anatomy (1975)
- Karl Spencer Lashley Award (1973)
- Academic Gold Medal (1985)
- The Hungarian Order of Merit Cross with the Star (1992)
- Fellow of the Royal Society

== Sources ==
- Réthelyi Nicholas John Szentágothai. In: Zs to Hungarian scientist from the lexicon. Spices. Ferenc Nagy. Budapest: Better, MTESZ; OMIKK. 1997th 762–764. P.. ISBN 963-85433-5-3
- Bela Flerkó John Szentágothai. Budapest: Academic Press, 1998th (The last Hungarian scientists) ISBN 963-05-7490-X
- Bela fisherman John Szentágothai (1912–1994), In: Famous Hungarian doctors. Eds. Kapronczay Charles E. Water New Year's Eve. Bp: Galen, 2000, 126–131.
- Réthelyi Nicholas John Szentágothai. In: National anniversary 2012th Editor: John Eston. Bp: Balassi Institute, 2012. 5–8. (PDF format. Anniversary National 2012)
- Hungary nagylexikon XVI. (Sel-Sat). Spices. Lamb Lászlóné. Budapest: Hungarian Grand Lexicon. 2003rd 644 of P.. ISBN 963-9257-15-X
- Choice – Parliamentary Almanac 1990, Budapest: Local Propaganda and Publishing Company, 1990, 233 old.

Cultural offices
Preceded by Tibor Erdey-Grúz	President of the Hungarian Academy of Sciences; 1976–1985	Succeeded by Iván T. Berend
