= Péter Érdi =

Hungarian-American computational neuroscientist

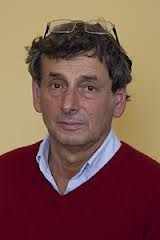
- Born: December 12, 1946 (age 79); Budapest, Hungary
- Education: Eötvös Loránd University, Budapest
- Awards: Henry R. Luce Professor (2002-); Széchenyi Professorship (1998-2002); Honorary Professor, Obuda University
- Scientific career
- Fields: Complex Systems, Computational Neuroscience, Cybernetics
- Workplaces: Kalamazoo College, Wigner Research Centre for Physics of the Hungarian Academy of Sciences
- Self-introduction recorded in January 2014

Péter Érdi (born December 12, 1946) is a Hungarian-born computational neuroscientist who now lives in Michigan, United States where he is a Henry R. Luce Professor at Kalamazoo College. In his career he wrote several books and published (co-published) many scholarly articles in the fields of chemical kinetics, computational neuroscience and complex systems.

== Background ==
Érdi was born in 1946 in Budapest, Hungary. He was the only son of Pál Érdi, a chief engineer at the tannery factory and Magdolna Friedmann, an office manager at the journal Nagyvilág. He has two children and two grandchildren. His mentors were Pál Benedek and János Szentágothai

After graduating in 1965 at János Bolyai High School, Budapest, he went on to study Chemistry at Eötvös Loránd University and Chemical Cybernetics at Budapest University of Technology and Economics where he completed Master's degrees in both disciplines. Eventually, in 1991 he received Doctor of Science (DSc) for his paper on "Kinetics of Chemical and Biological Networks".

In 2002, he and his family moved to Michigan, USA where he holds the Henry R. Luce professorship at Kalamazoo College while he kept his position in his home institution in Budapest.

== Career ==
In 1992, Érdi began working as a scientific advisor of the KFKI Research Institute for Particle and Nuclear Physics of the Hungarian Academy of Sciences. He filled the role of the leading scientist on the project Big Data. Érdi's team was working on a method of predicting future technologies by analysing historical data of (mainly) US held patents.

In 1995 he began to hold a position as a University Professor at University of Debrecen and later, also at Budapest University of Technology and Economics. In between 1999 and 2002, he served as Széchenyi Professor at the Department of History and Philosophy of Science, Eötvös Loránd University, Budapest. After leaving Hungary and moving to the United States in 2002, he began his career as the Henry R. Luce Professor of Complex Systems Studies at Kalamazoo College. He has been awarded by the 2018 Florence J. Lucasse Fellowship for Excellence in Scholarship.

Érdi also prides himself as the co-founder and co-director of BSCS (Budapest Semester in Cognitive Sciences), which is a Hungarian study program for undergraduate students, mainly from USA, that are interested in Cognitive Science and its disciplines.

== ELMOHA ==
In 1990, Érdi established with János Tóth the informal organization ELMOHA (Hungarian acronym of the three words: Theory, Model, Tradition) with the primary goal of the group to establish a proper discussion between humanities and natural sciences. A group of intellectuals from various fields of sciences and humanities met up regularly and discussed science and the interpretations of science.

Early members of the group were Péter Balassa, János László Farkas, Péter Hraskó, György Kampis, József Lázár, János Malina, László Ropolyi, Róbert Schiller, Péter Marton. Also psychologist and linguist Csaba Pléh and Gábor Hraskó who is the president of Hungarian Skeptics Society, have also attended on several ELMOHA meetings. These meetings are often the subject of newspaper articles, books and university courses.

== Memberships ==
- Editorial and Programme Advisory Board of the Springer Complexity publishing program
- Executive Committee of the European Neural Network Society (2005-2007)
- Member of the Board of Governors of the International Neural Network Society (2012-2020)
- Vice President of Membership of the (2017-2018)
- Co-Director of BSCS - Budapest Semester in Cognitive Science
- Associate Editor of BioSystems, Elsevier
- Editor-in-Chief (2015-2019) of Cognitive Systems Research, Elsevier
- College of Fellow Member, International Neural Network Society
- Secretary and Vice President Protocol, International Society for the Systems Sciences (ISSS)

== Books ==
- P. Érdi: Feedback: How to Destroy or Save the World, Springer 2024
- P. Érdi, Zs. Szvetelszky: Repair: When and How to Improve Broken Objects, Ourselves, and Our Society, Springer 2002
- P. Érdi: Ranking: The Unwritten Rules of the Social Game We All Play, Oxford University Press, 2020

Translations: German: Redline Verlag, Münchner Verlagsgruppe GmbH: Japanese: Nippon Hyoron Sha Co: Korean: Writing House: Taiwanese: Babelbook: Hungarian: Typotex: Chinese with simple characters: Shanghai Educational Publ, House (in preparation)

- P. Érdi, Bhattacharya BS and Cochran AL: {Editors): Computational Neurology and Psychiatry (Springer Series in Bio-/Neuroinformatics Book 6
- P. Érdi: Complexity Explained, Springer, 2008
- P. Érdi: Teremtett valóság, Typotex, Budapest, 2000
- Michael A. Arbib, P. Érdi and János Szentágothai: Neural Organization: Structure, Function Dynamics, MIT Press, A Bradford Book, 1997
- P. Érdi, J. Tóth: Mathematical Models of Chemical Reactions. Manchester Univ. Press., 1989. Princeton University Press, 1989
- P. Érdi: Racionális kémiai termodinamika, ELTE TTK Kémiai Kibernetikai Laboratórium, Budapest, 1978
- J. Tóth, P. Érdi: A formális reakciókinetika modelljei, Akadémiai kiadó, Budapest, 1978
- P. Érdi, J. Tóth: A kémiai reakció termodinamikájának sztochasztikus formulázásáról, Akadémiai kiadó, Budapest, 1976
- P. Érdi, G. Lente: Stochastic Chemical Kinetics
