= Dezső Németh =

Hungarian psychologist

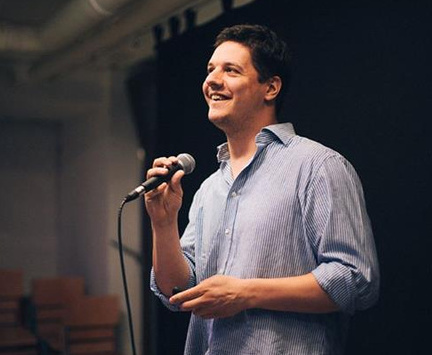
- Born: September 1, 1975 (age 50); Szeged, Hungary
- Awards: Master Teacher Gold Medal (2009)
- Scientific career
- Fields: Implicit learning; Psycholinguistics; Alzheimer's disease, Huntington's disease, autism and experimental neuropsychological testing
- Workplaces: INSERM, Lyon Claude Bernard University Lyon 1, Lyon Eötvös Loránd University, Budapest; Georgetown University (Washington DC); University of Szeged Institut of Psychology University of Texas, Austin

Notes
- memoteam.org

Dezső Németh (1 September 1975, Szeged) is a Hungarian psychologist and cognitive neuroscientist at INSERM, research team leader in Lyon Neuroscience Research Center (CRNL).

== Education ==
Dezső Németh graduated from the Endre Ságvári High School, in 1994, Szeged. He learned psychology at the Eötvös Loránd University, 1994–1999. He graduated in 1999.

Németh obtained his PhD at ELTE (Budapest, 2005), habilitation at University of Pécs (Pécs, 2011) and DSc at Hungarian Academy of Sciences (Budapest, 2018).

== Career ==
He worked as a visiting professor at the Department of Neuroscience of Georgetown University (Washington DC) in 2007-2008 and in 2011–2012 at University of Texas, Austin (Russell Poldrack's Lab).

He worked at the University of Szeged, Hungary (1999–2012) and the Institute of Psychology at Eötvös Loránd University (2012–present).

== Awards ==
- Mérei Ferenc Award (2005)
- MTA Bolyai Research Fellowship (2007)
- Hungarian State Eötvös Scholarship (2007)
- Certificate of Appreciation (Pro Scientia, teacher) (2009)
- Master Teacher Gold Medal (2011)
- Kardos Lajos Commemorative Medal (Institute for Psychology, Hungarian Academy of Sciences, 2016)

== See also ==
- Google Scholar Profile of Dezső Németh
