= Óbuda Jewish Cemetery =

Jewish cemetery in Budapest, Hungary

- Óbudai zsidó temető
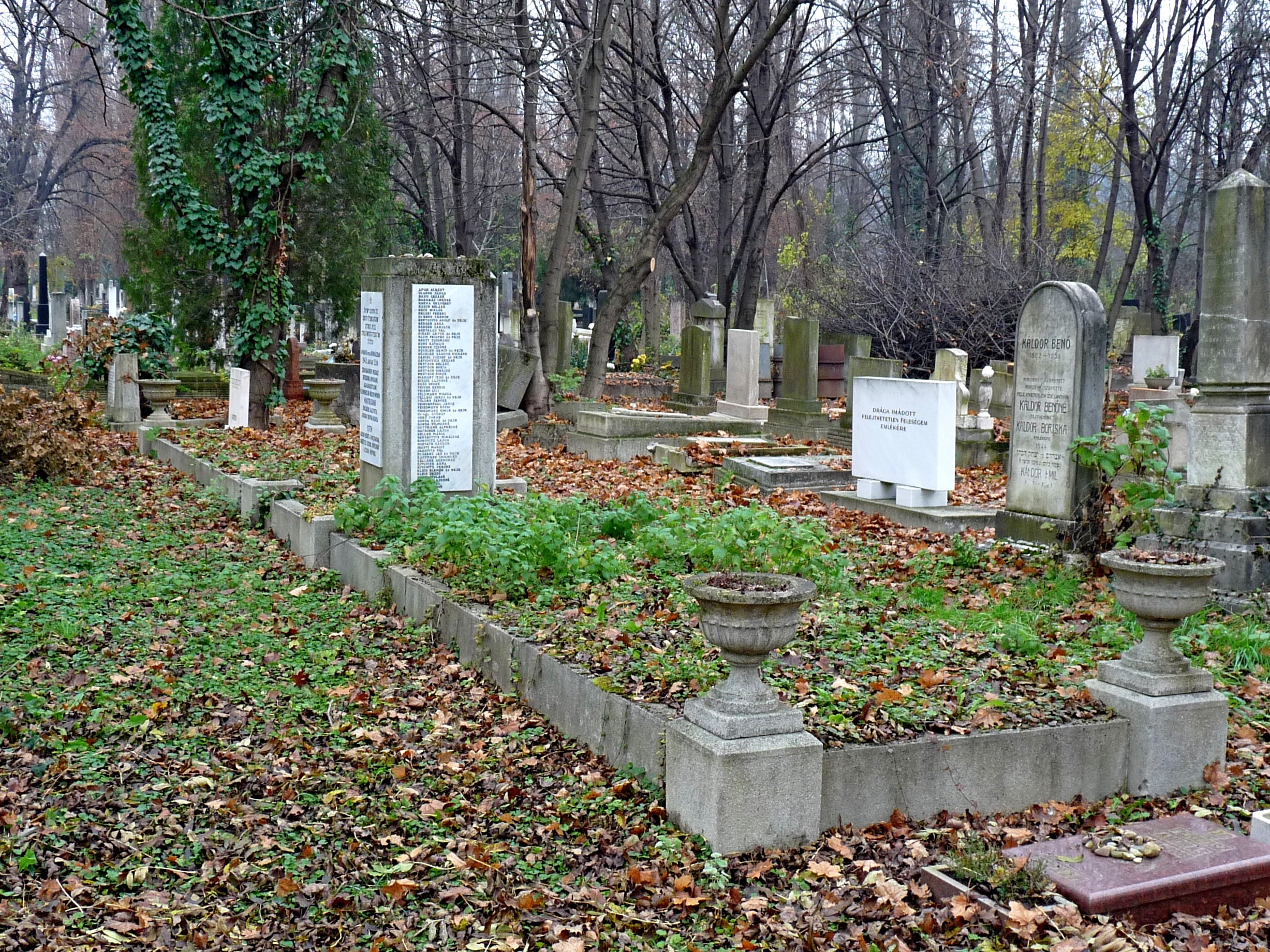
- Common grave of the victims of the Jewish Hospital Massacre on Maros Street in the Óbuda Jewish Cemetery
- Interactive map of Óbuda Jewish Cemetery

Details
- Established: 1922
- Location: Budapest District III
- Country: Hungary
- Coordinates: 47.5717°N 19.0189°E
- Type: Jewish
- Find a Grave: Óbuda Jewish Cemetery

The Jewish Cemetery of Óbuda in Budapest, Hungary, was opened by the Jewish community in 1922 in the Óbuda-Békásmegyer district (District III) of Budapest. The opening speech was delivered by Ignác Schreiber, a young rabbi, who died only three days later, becoming the first person to be buried there.

Later the remains of Moses Münz, Gyula Wellesz and Gyula Klein, chief rabbis of Óbuda, were brought there. The tomb of Moses Münz is a significant place of pilgrimage. Renowned Jewish Hungarian artists and scientists are also buried here, including the writer, Andor Endre Gelléri, and the psychologist, Ferenc Mérei.

The mass grave of the Maros Street Hospital's 149 victims, patients, doctors and nurses alike, who were murdered in January 1945 by the members of the Hungarian Arrow Cross Party, during the Holocaust in Hungary, are located in this cemetery.
