= Ferenc Mérei =

Hungarian psychologist

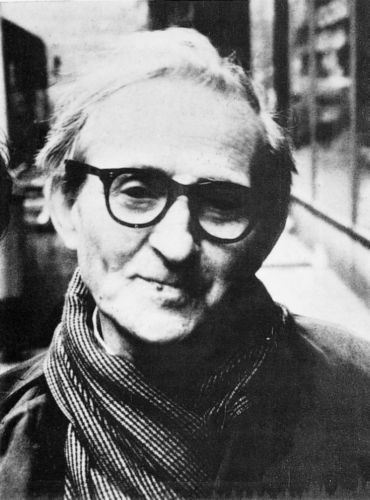
Ferenc Mérei

Ferenc Mérei (24 November 1909 – 23 February 1986) was a Hungarian psychologist and educator.

== Early life ==
Born in Budapest into a bourgeois family, Mérei often spent time in his parents' photography studio at the Garay Bazaar. He did not like school, where he felt excluded and his teachers' brutality caused him much pain. He read a lot, even 4-500-page books in one sitting. His mother's liaisons with several men disturbed him.

After graduating from high school, he studied at the Sorbonne from 1928, even though his mother wanted him to study in Berlin. He specialised in political economy, statistics and literature and studied eleven languages. It was child psychology and vocational guidance that really captivated his interest. Henri Wallon received him at the university as his pupil, and directed him in studying child psychology. He joined the French Communist Party in 1930.

He gave his first scientific lecture in 1932. The lecture, in which he criticised Jean Piaget, attracted Wallon's disapproval, and it was then that Mérei developed his key idea, the essence of which is the social determination of humans.

He obtained two degrees, one from a career advising college, and one from the Sorbonne Faculty of Arts in philosophy, sociology, psychology and pedagogy. He made lifelong friends in Paris, where they and his teachers shaped his ideals and his world view.

== Career ==
After his return to Hungary in 1934 for a time he became a pupil of Leopold Szondi, as a fresh graduate he could not find employment, so he worked as a psychologist without pay at the Állami Gyermeklélektani Intézet (State Children's Psychological Institute), founded by János Schnell) until 1938. He was the first to research the social experience affecting the individual and the social role of the formation of rules and norms. He published two theses in 1937: Child playing with buttons and The country-building child.

Between 1938 and 1940 he worked at the Special Education Teacher Training College, once again without a salary, so he lived on the money he received from teaching languages. He married a teacher of special education (Vera Mérei née Molnár). They learned the organisation of examinations and worked together.

He was expelled from the laboratory because of the anti-Jewish laws. From 1940 he worked at the outpatient department of the Patronage Association led by Júlia György. In 1942 he wrote his first book, The Psychology of Choosing a Career, before he was sent away to do labour service. In 1944 he escaped, crossed the front line and joined the Soviet army, where he attained the rank of captain by the time his military service ended.

From 1945 until 1948 he was the leader of the Fővárosi Lélektani Intézet (Budapest Institute of Psychology), a teacher at the Pedagógiai Főiskola (Pedagogical College) and at the Eötvös Kollégium, and the leader of the central seminar of NÉKOSZ (People's National Association of Colleges). He was appointed the head of Országos Neveléslélektani Intézet (National Institute of Educational Psychology) in 1949. During these years he wrote several studies and three books: The Child's World View (1945), Collective Experience (1947) and Study of the Child (1948). His collective experience experiments are among the most important psychological experiments.

In 1949 he was awarded the Kossuth Prize (silver medal) for his pedagogical work. In 1950 the institute was liquidated, Mérei was discharged from his position, and he became a translator for a living. He was rehabilitated in 1956, becoming a key scientific scholar at the Hungarian Academy of Sciences Institute of Psychology, then in 1958 at the Institute of Biochemistry.

He was arrested in October 1958 and charged with seditious organisation and was sentenced to 10 years. He spent his imprisonment first in Budapest, then Sátoraljaújhely and finally in Vác. He started his "Psychological Diary" at the National Prison in Sátoraljaújhely in 1960 (he wrote it on toilet paper for want of any other paper). His health deteriorated while he was in prison and he had a stroke. He received an amnesty in March 1963.

From February 1964 he worked at the National Neurological and Mental Hospital where he founded and became the leader of the clinical psychology laboratory. With the aim of having a workshop, he gathered his colleagues and students around him, including Ferenc Szakács, Lívia Nemes and Ágnes Binét. His laboratory became the centre for the training of psychologists in Hungary. Ágnes Binét became the co-author of two of his successful books, Child Psychology and the Ablak-Zsiráf child encyclopedia.

His sociometric examinations focused on the inner dynamics of groups and the roles of the individual. In his book Child Study he writes about the world view of children and the logic of the child's mind, based on his own experiments. It contains his theories about the development of the knowledge of mores and ethics, social behaviour, the sociometric analysis of the classes, the world view of the children and the development of values.

Between 1965 and 1970 fifty issues of the serial Vademecum, founded by Mérei, were published. Most of these were written by him for his students. They are still used in the education of psychologists. In the 1970s he wrote several significant books: The hidden network of communities (1971), Clinical methods in psychodiagnostics (1974) and Clinical Psychology (1974). From 1976 he led the Hungarian Psychological Society (Magyar Pszichológiai Társaság) and the training of psychodramatists.

In 1982 he was named a doctor of psychology by the Hungarian Academy of Sciences and was awarded the Pál Ranschburg medallion.

An interview film was prepared with him in 1984, when he was recovering after a serious operation. Parts of the interview, in which he was criticising the politics of Hungary, were not shown on TV until 2009.

He first wrote about his views on educational policy in 1948 in the study Democracy in School. This was not published until 1985. The ideal school, according to Mérei, is child-centered, and raises the child to be able to think independently. "If we want to change people, then it is essential to change pedagogy (...) so I studied the possibilities of change during pedagogy." He considered the training of teachers to be very important and did much to improve it.

== Studies in English and German ==
- Indirect modelling: Actometric investigations from the field of developmental social psychology (1980). Akadémiai Kiadó, Budapest. pp. 35–48. From Attitudes, interaction and personality.
- Studies in clinical psychodiagnostics and psychotherapy. Authors Mérei at al.; ed.-in-chief Lajos Kardos (1987). Akadémiai Kiadó, Budapest. 191 p. ISBN 963-05-4068-1
- Ferenc Mérei; Stephen Neiger; Beatrice J. Bouhoutsos: Der Aufforderungscharakter der Rorschach-Tafeln (Innsbruck, 1953)

== Prizes (selected) ==
- Kossuth Prize (1949)
- Ranschburg Pál medallion (1982)

== Literature ==
- Pedagógiai lexikon. Keraban Könyvkiadó, (1997) in Hungarian
- Bagdy E. – Forgács P. – Pál M.: Mérei emlékkönyv. Budapest, (1989) in Hungarian
- Erős F.: Mérei Ferenc fényében és árnyékában. Budapest, (1989) in Hungarian
- Mérei Élet-Mű, Tanulmányok (2006) in Hungarian
- Sárvári Gáborné közlése in Hungarian

== Legacy ==
- The Hungarian Psychological Association founded the Ferenc Mérei Publication Prize, awarded annually to a young scholar.
- By the decision of the Budapest City Assembly, the biggest pedagogical institute of the country bears Mérei's name from the semester starting in Autumn 2008. The naming ceremony was held on 9 October 2008 in the Vas Street building of the institute. Gábor Demszky, the mayor of Budapest opened the exhibition about Mérei's life and unveiled the memorial plaque on the wall of the institute. The ceremony was attended by Mérei's family members.

Mérei is buried in the Óbuda Jewish Cemetery.

== Sources ==
- Auestad, Lene; Treacher Kabesh, Amal (13 September 2017). Traces of Violence and Freedom of Thought. Springer. p. 201. ISBN 978-1-137-57501-2.
- Csaba Pléh: Pszichológiatörténet.(=The History of Psychology) Budapest : Gondolat, 1992. Ferenc Mérei see 221–223. p. ISBN 963-282-467-9
- From Hungarian Wikipedia
