= Csaba Pléh =

Hungarian academic (born 1945)

Pléh Csaba
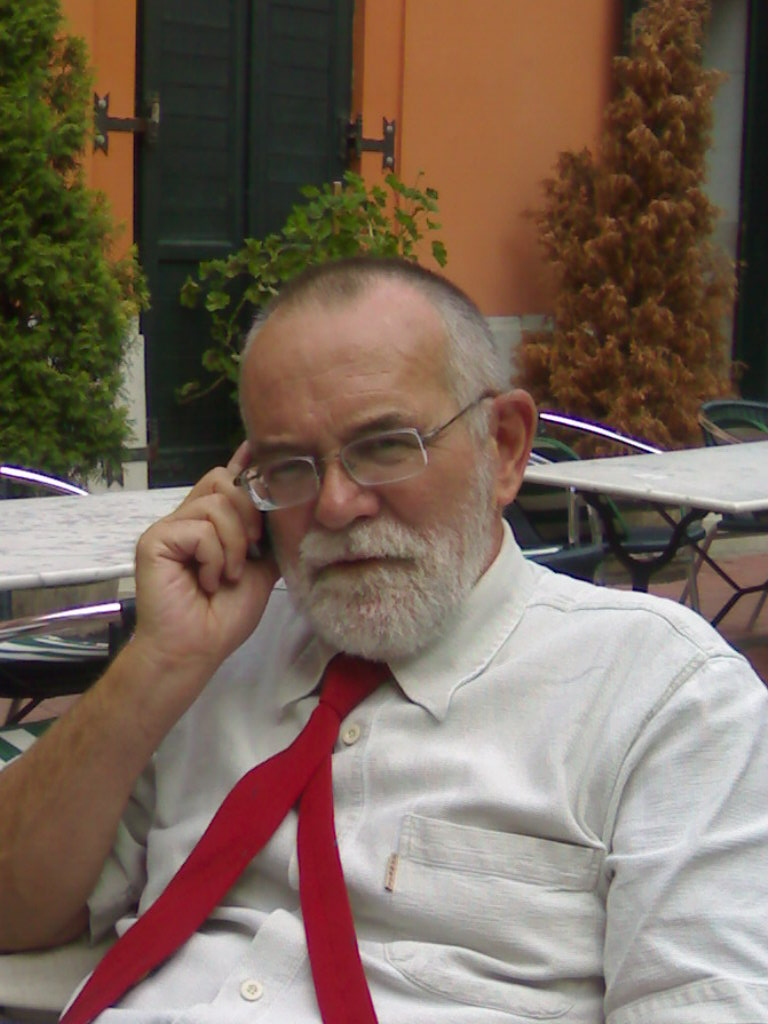
- Born: 29 November 1945 (age 80); Sárisáp, Kingdom of Hungary
- Awards: Academy Prize (HAS); The Middle Cross of the Decoration of Hungarian Republic with the Star; Niveau Prize, (HAS)
- Scientific career
- Fields: Cognitive science Evolutionary models of cognition and language History of psychology
- Workplaces: Budapest University of Technology and Economics; University of Szeged; Eötvös Loránd University

Notes
- Deputy General Secretary, Hungarian Academy of Sciences

Csaba Pléh (born 29 November 1945) is a Hungarian psychologist and linguist, professor at the Department of Cognitive Science, Budapest University of Technology and Economics.

== Academic career ==
He graduated from the Eötvös Loránd University where he earned his degrees in psychology (1969) and linguistics (1973). In 1970 he received his PhD in psychology. He became Candidate of Psychological Science in 1984 and Doctor of Psychological Science in 1997. He obtained his habilitation in 1998. He became a corresponding member of the Hungarian Academy of Sciences is 1998, a full member in 2004.

== See also ==
- Hungarian Academy of Sciences
- Cognitive Science and Neuropsychology Program of Szeged
- Institute of Psychology (Szeged)
- Péter Érdi
