= List of cemeteries in Budapest =

This is a list of cemeteries in Budapest, Hungary. The most famous of them is Kerepesi Cemetery, one of the biggest national pantheons in Europe, where several Hungarian notables are buried in ornate monuments. The second most significant may be Farkasréti Cemetery, including the graves of further illustrious people.

The largest cemetery in Budapest (and one of the largest ones in Europe) is Új köztemető (New Public Cemetery); it comprises an area of about 2.07 km².

- Angeli Street Cemetery
- Budafoki Cemetery
- Cinkotai Cemetery
- Csepeli Cemetery
- Csörsz Street Cemetery (Orthodox Jewish cemetery, out of use since 1961)
- Farkasréti Cemetery
- Gránátos Street Cemetery (Orthodox Jewish cemetery)
- Kerepesi Cemetery (Kerepesi temető; official name: Fiumei úti sírkert)
- Kispesti Cemetery
- Kozma Street Cemetery (the biggest Jewish cemetery in Hungary, with the monument of 600,000 Jewish martyrs, famous for its art nouveau memorials)
- New Public Cemetery, Budapest (Új köztemető; Rákoskeresztúri sírkert)
- Óbuda Jewish Cemetery
- Óbudai Cemetery
- Pestszenterzsébeti Cemetery
- Pestszentlőrinci Cemetery
- Rákospalotai Cemetery
- Salgotarjani Street Jewish Cemetery
- Tamás Street Urn Cemetery
- Újpest, Megyeri Cemetery
