= Museum of National Remembrance =

Museum in Budapest, Hungary

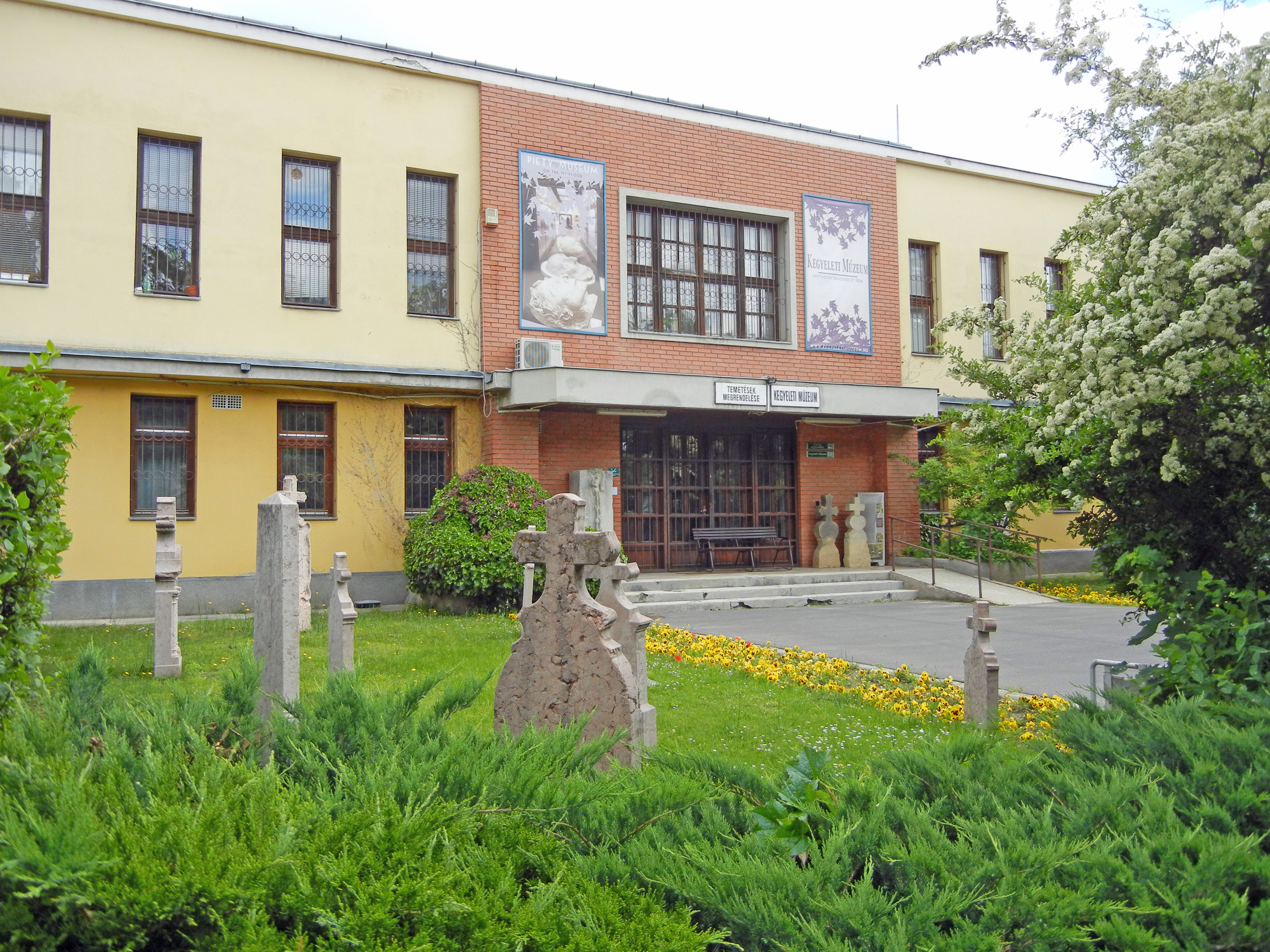
- Coordinates: 47.4956°N 19.0857°E

The Museum of National Remembrance (in Hungarian: Nemzeti Emlékezet Múzeuma), formerly the Mercy Museum — Burial and Mercy Collection (in Hungarian: Kegyeleti Múzeum – Temetkezési és Kegyeleti Szakgyűjtemény), is Hungary's only ethnographic museum specifically dealing with burial history. The Kegyeleti Múzeum is located in the oldest cemetery in Budapest, operating since 1849, in the Fiume Road Graveyard (1086 Budapest, Fiumei út 16–18).

== History ==
The museum was established in 1991 by Jenő Ladányi, director of the Budapest Burial Institute Rt., in cooperation with ethnographer Zoltán Xantus with the aim of collecting the smaller monuments of burial history that can still be found, primarily in Budapest and its surroundings. The employees of the institute also contributed to the collection of objects. The collection area of the museum concerned Budapest and its surroundings until 1993, from 1995 it was extended to the whole of Hungary, and later to the Carpathian basin. A short film about the first 25 years of the permanent exhibition of Hungary's only funeral and eulogy collection is continuously shown in the exhibition space.

In the 2010s, the museum and the cemetery were taken over from the Budapest Burial Institute by the National Heritage Institute. The name of the Mercy Museum was also changed to the Museum of National Remembrance.

== Exhibitions ==
Permanent exhibition:

- Between heaven and earth - From farewell to memory

The museum also often organizes temporary exhibitions related to burial history.

(permanent) open-air art exhibition next to the museum building:

- The Apponyi carriage. A large hearse used in the first half of the 20th century, exhibited in 2017

The Mercy Museum operates with five exhibition spaces and a documentation department.

== Sources ==
- https://fiumeiutisirkert.nori.gov.hu/nemzeti-emlekezet-muzeuma
- Az Apponyi-hintó. NÖRI-füzetek 1., Nemzeti Örökség Intézete, Budapest, é. n. [2010-es évek]
- Kegyeleti múzeum (Piety museum), a Kegyeleti Múzeum Kiadása, Budapest, é. n. [1990-es évek]

== Video ==
- Restoration of the Apponyi carriage – YouTube.com, Közzététel: 2017
- The last journey of Lajos Kossuth – YouTube.com, Közzététel: 2020. nov. 17. – The Museum of National Remembrance's Living History - a short film made for a different competition, which tells the story of the preparation for the funeral of Lajos Kossuth and the events of the funeral.
