= Salgotarjani Street Jewish Cemetery =

Cemetery in Budapest, Hungary

Coordinates: 47.4915°N 19.0991°E

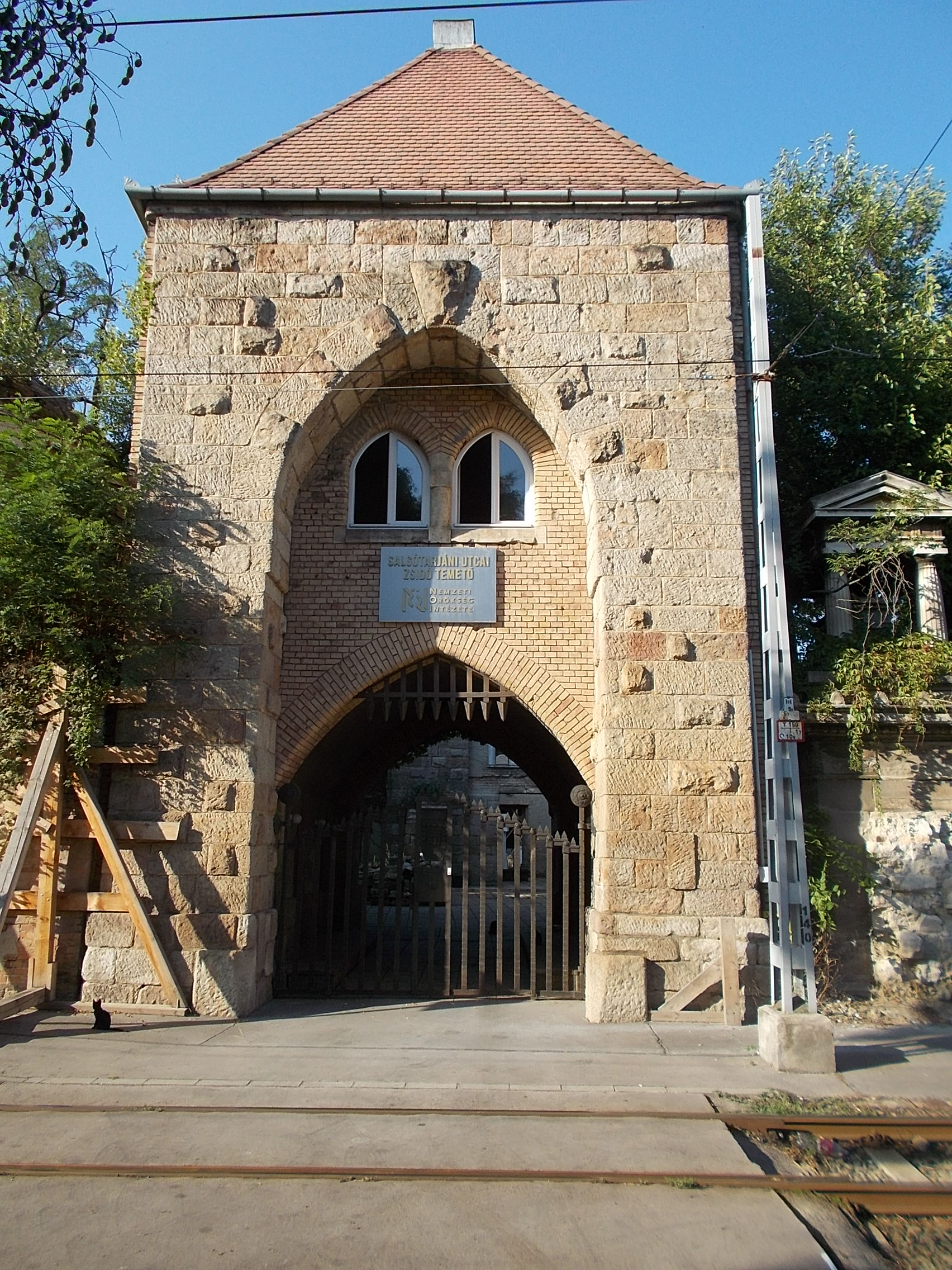
Entrance of Salgotarjani Street Jewish Cemetery

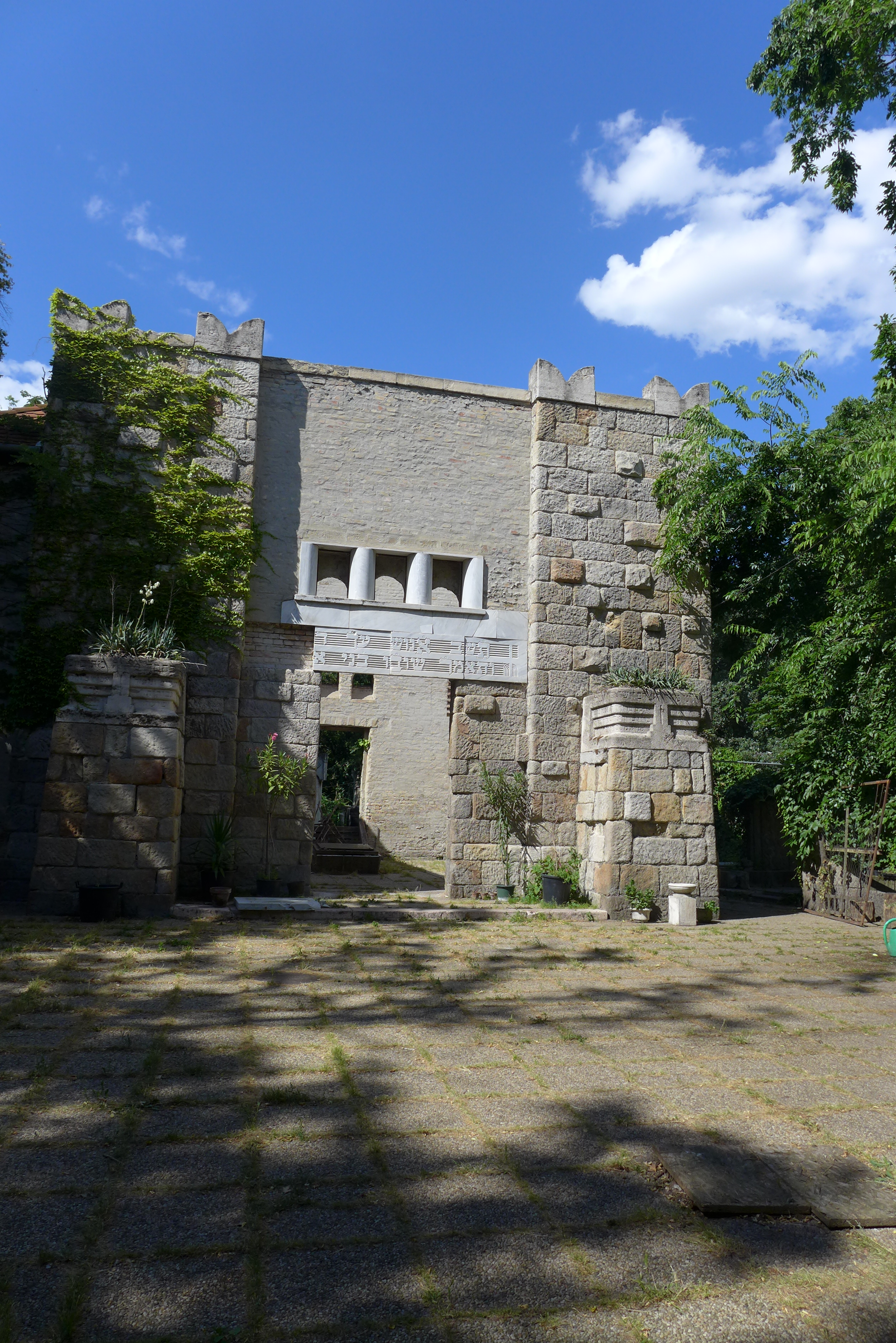
Mortuary of Salgotarjani Street Jewish Cemetery

The Salgotarjani Street Jewish Cemetery (Hungarian: Salgótarjáni úti zsidó temető) is a Jewish cemetery in Budapest, Hungary. It is located in the 8th district of Budapest Józsefváros, besides Kerepesi Cemetery (officially named Fiumei úti nemzeti sírkert), with a stone wall between them.

The cemetery opened in 1874 and is now the oldest remaining Jewish cemetery on the Pest side of the city. When it was created, it was the third Jewish cemetery, after the cemeteries of Vaci and Lehel Streets. The cemeteries of Vaci and Lehe have since been demolished with buildings have been erected there.

== Gallery ==
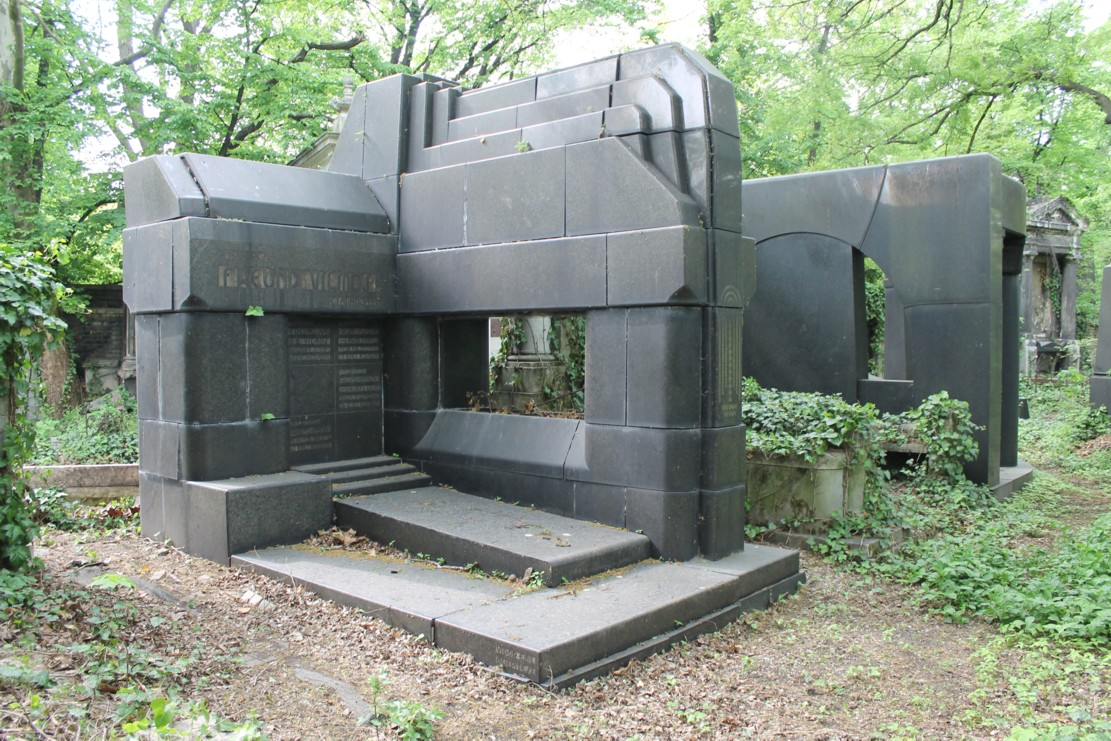

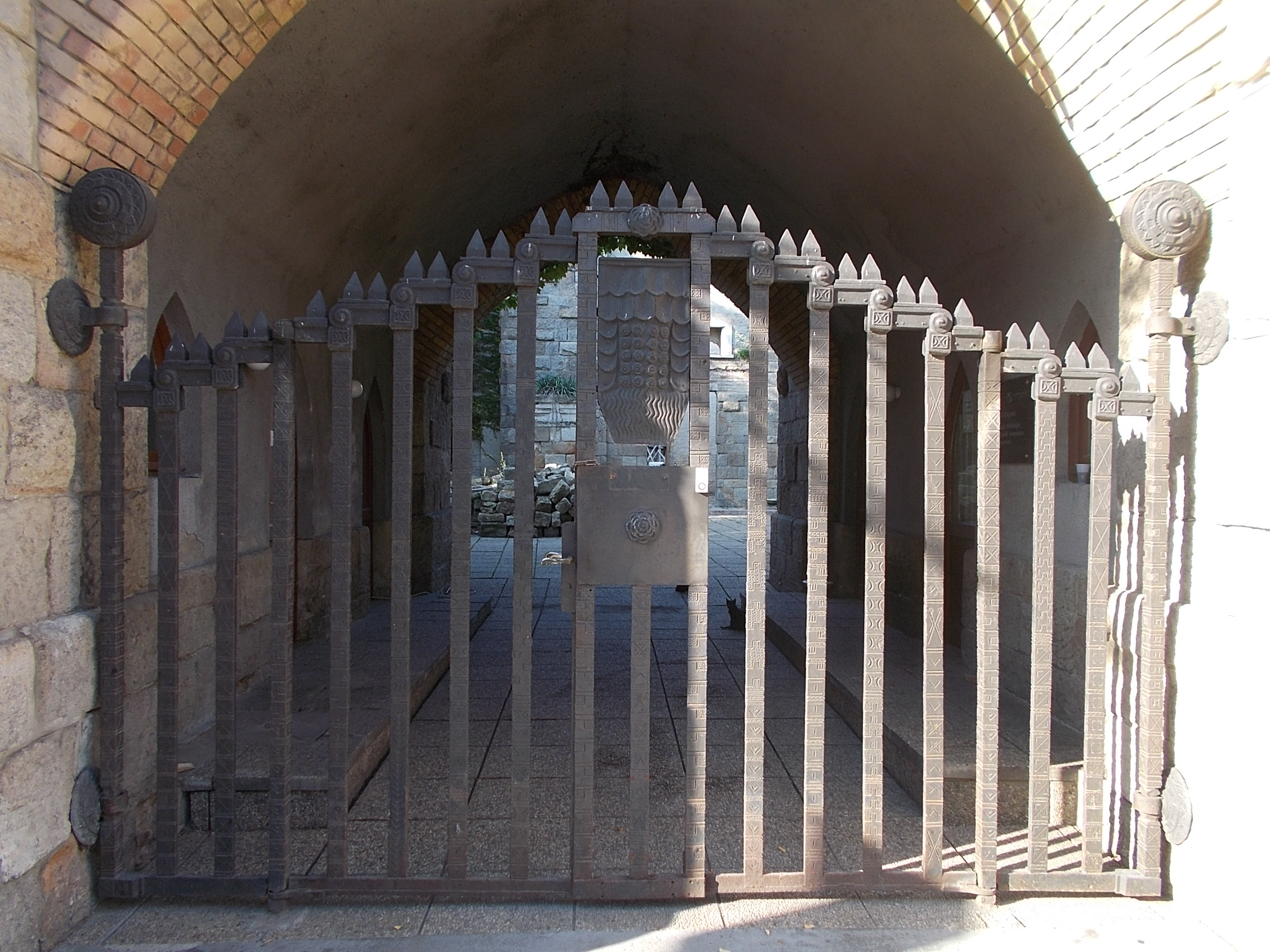

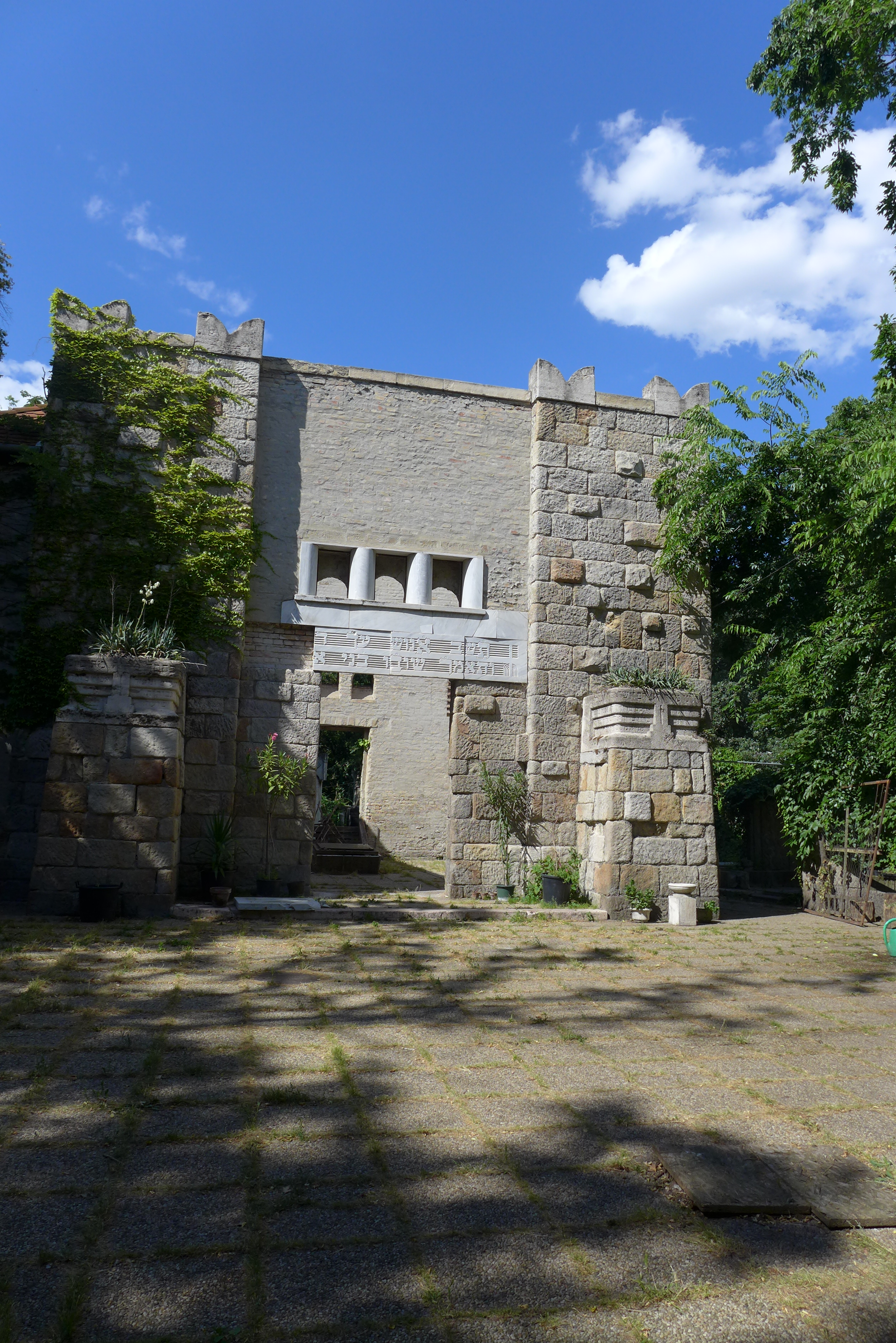

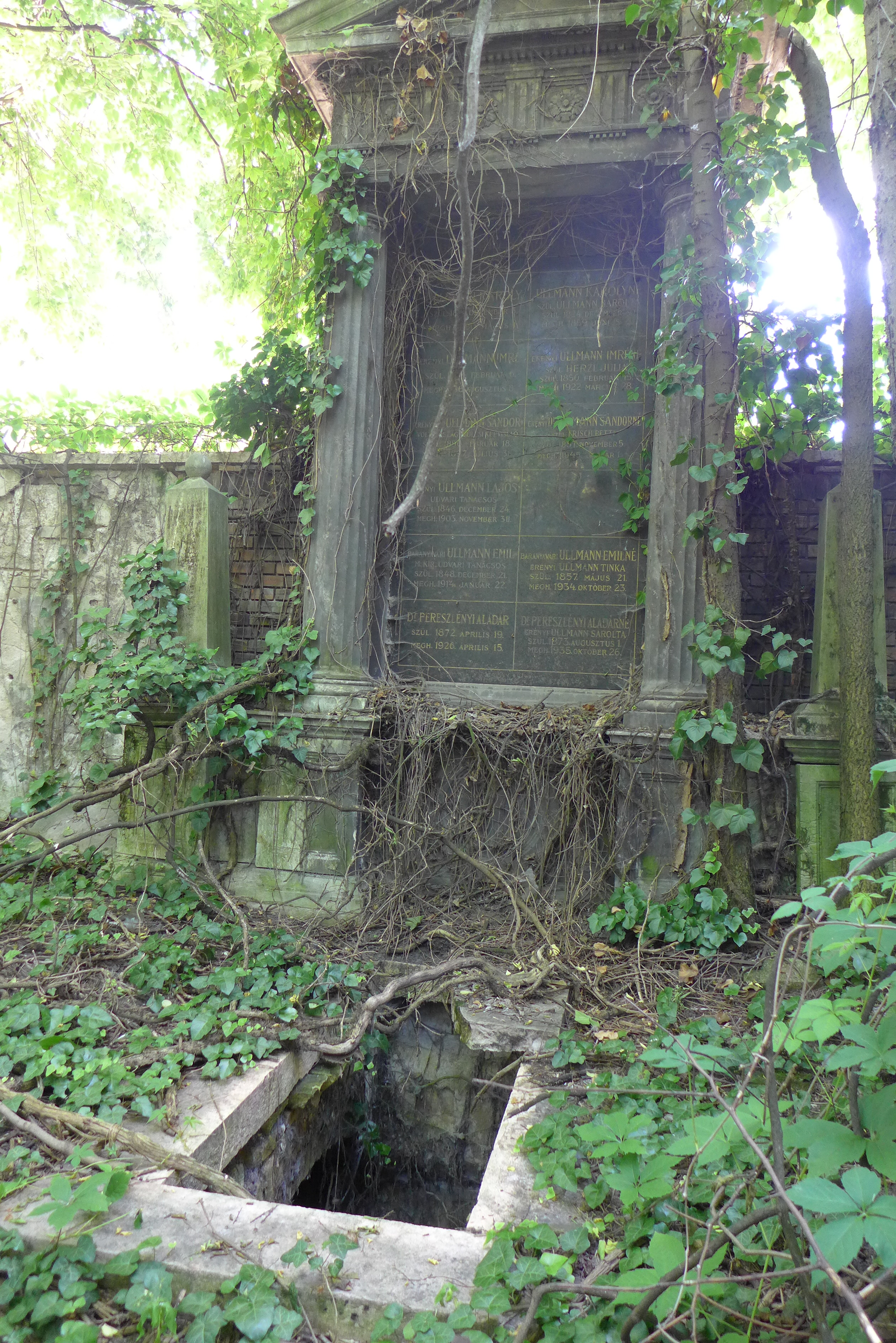

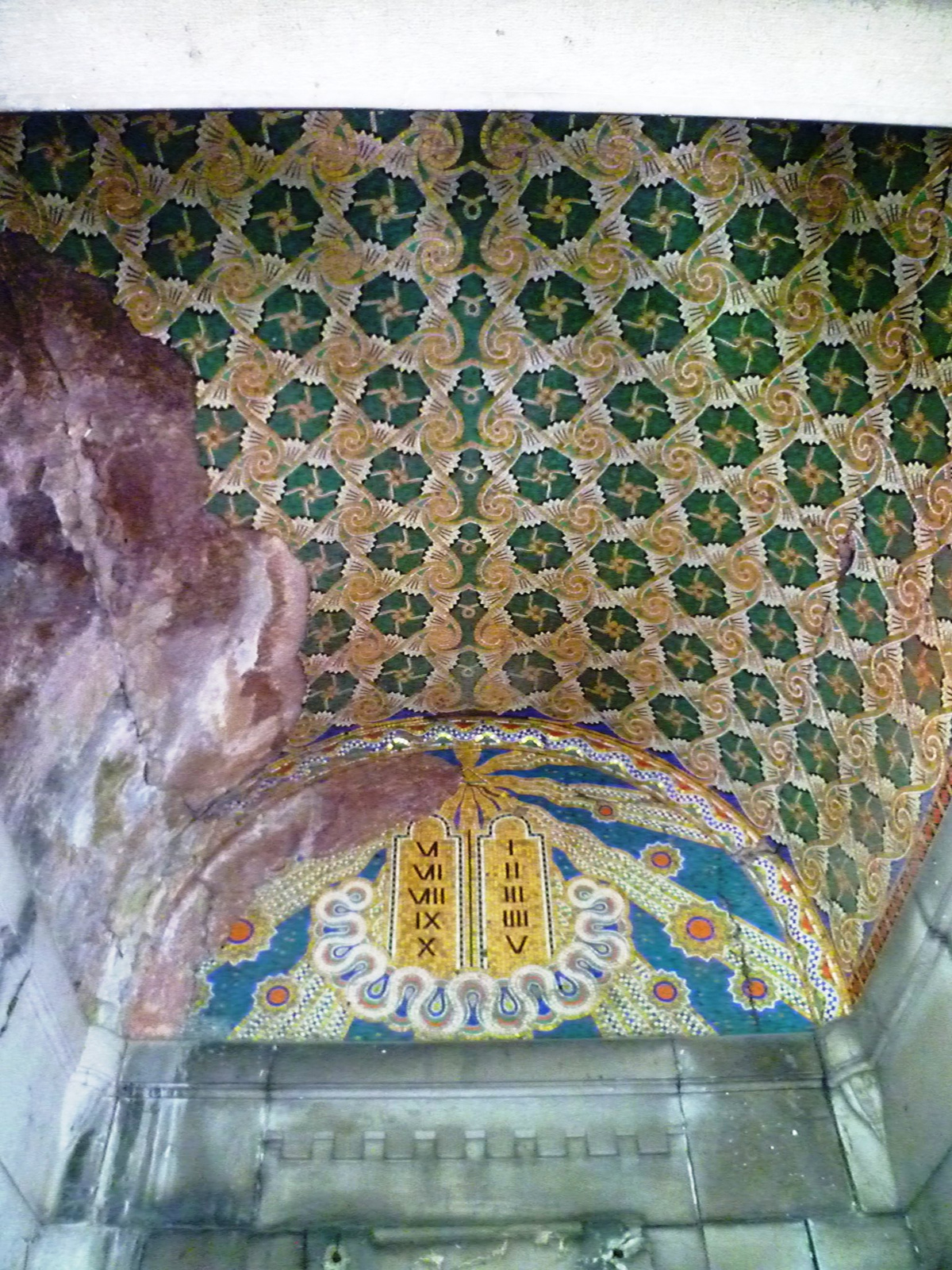

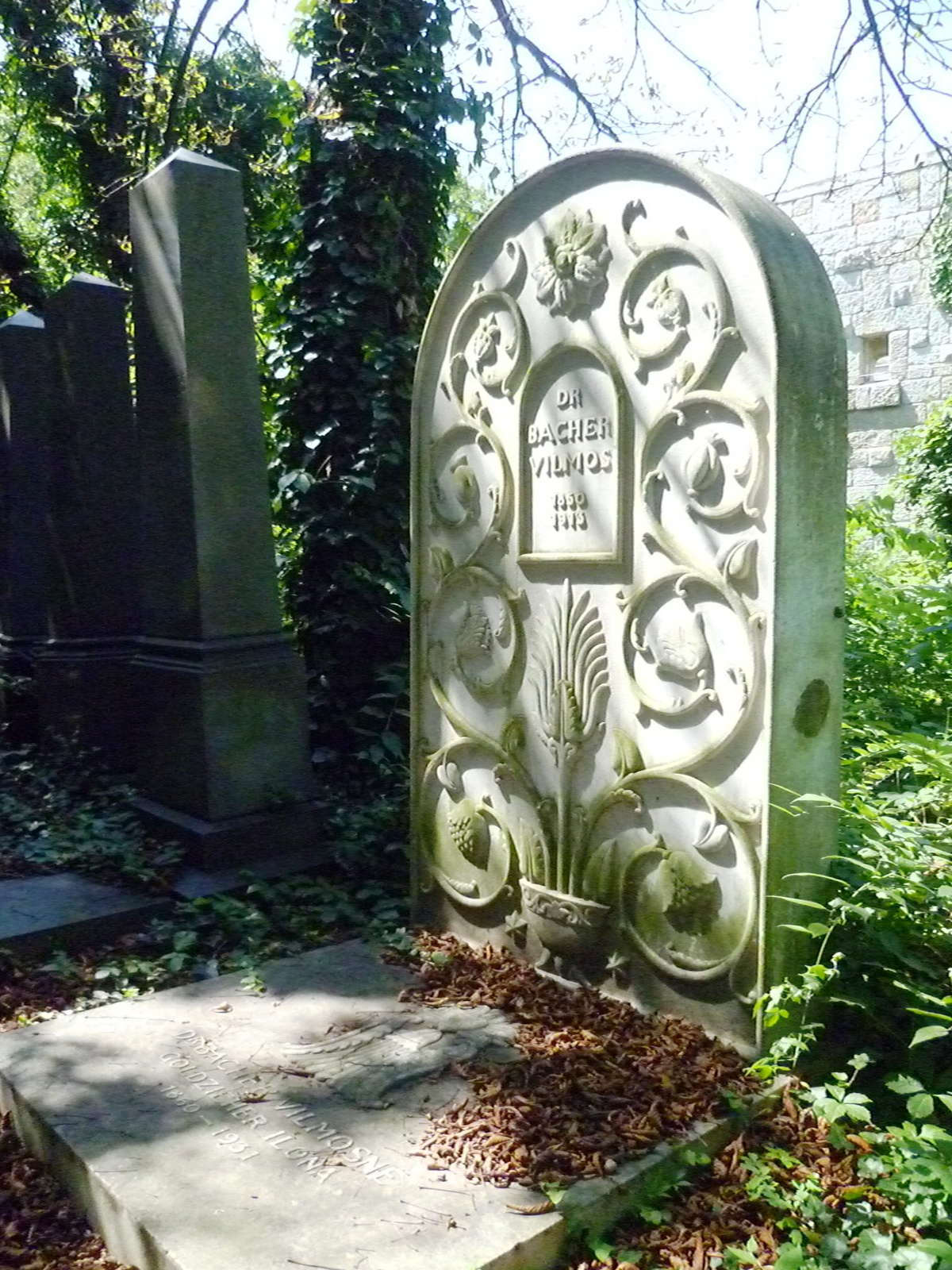

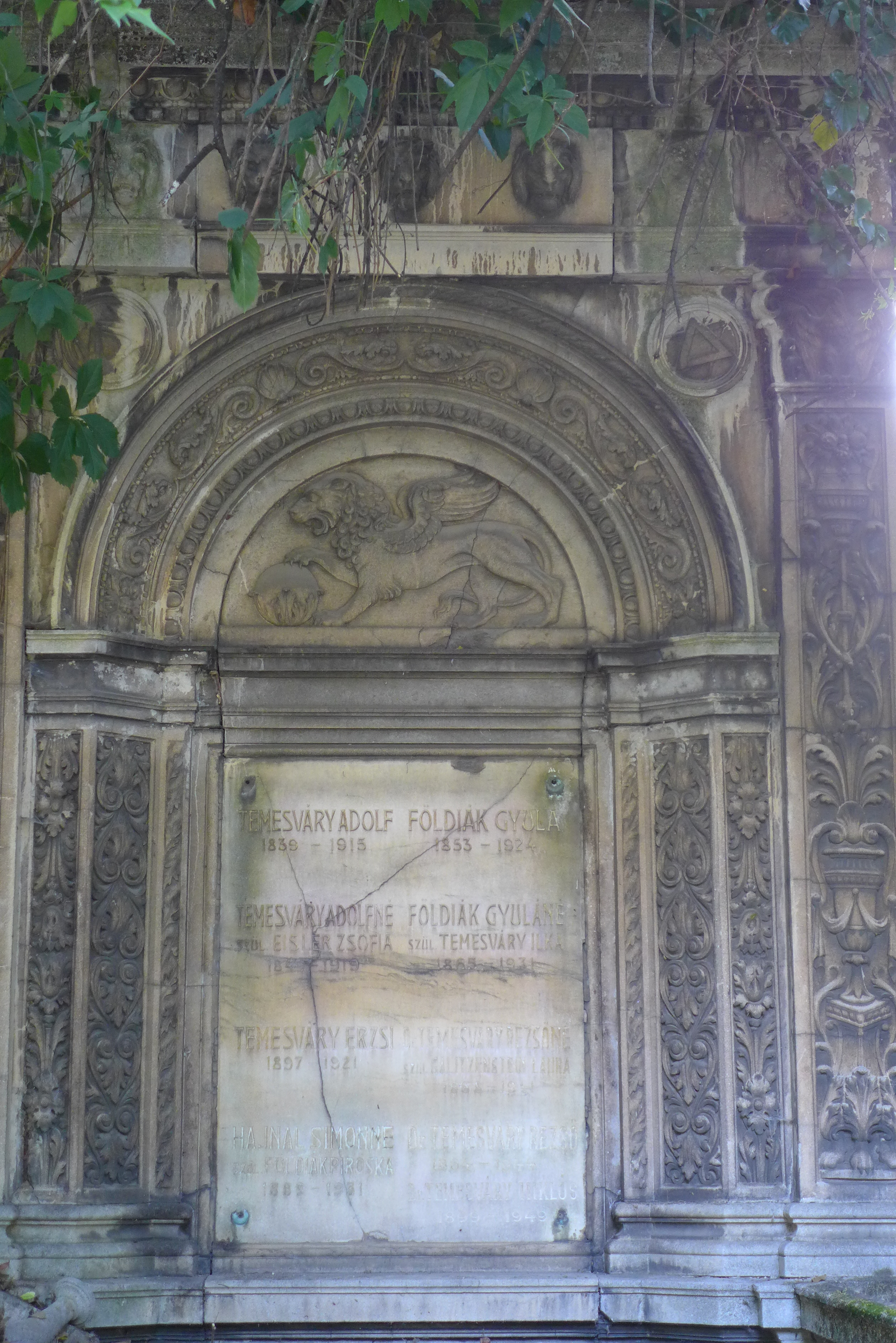

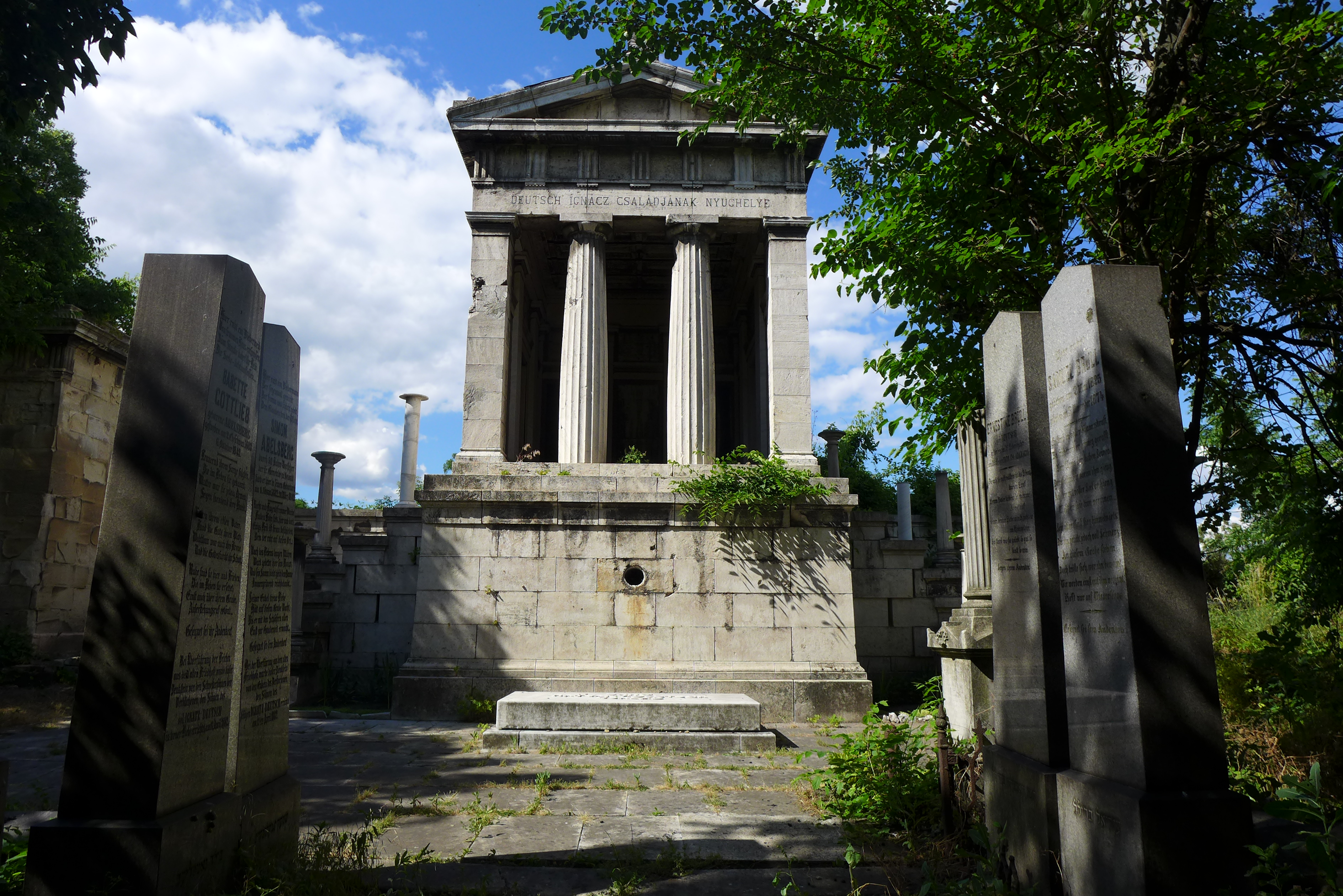

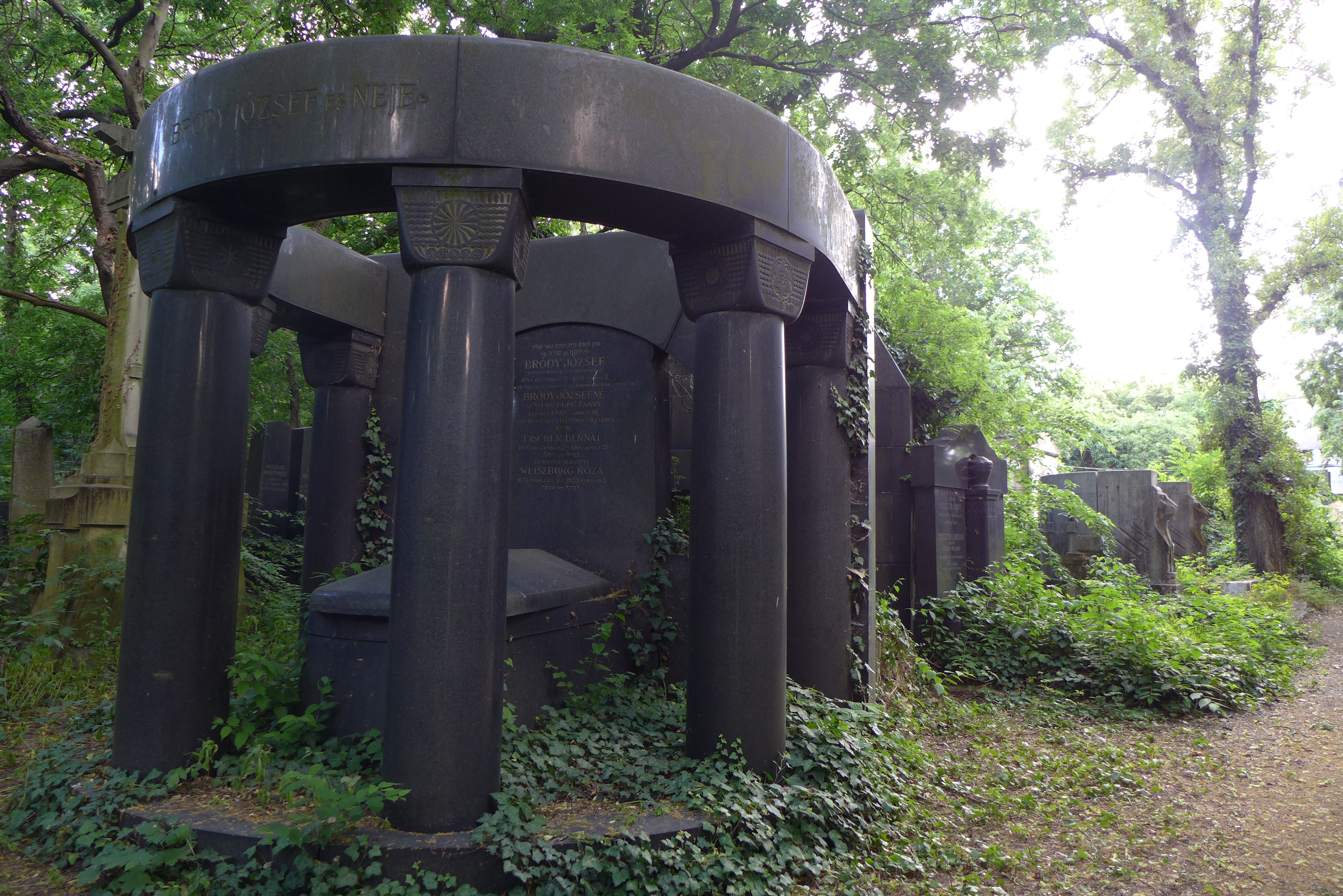

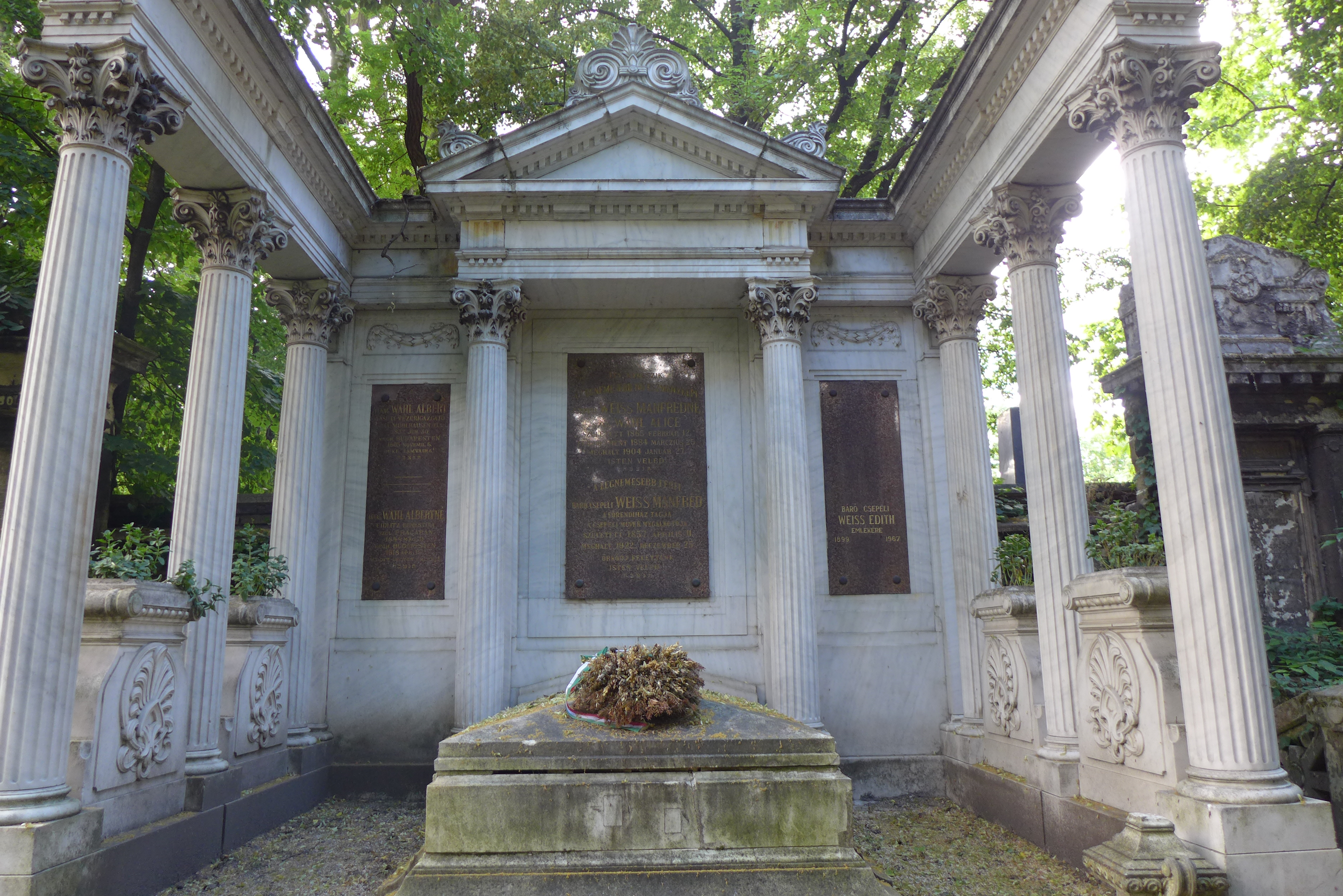

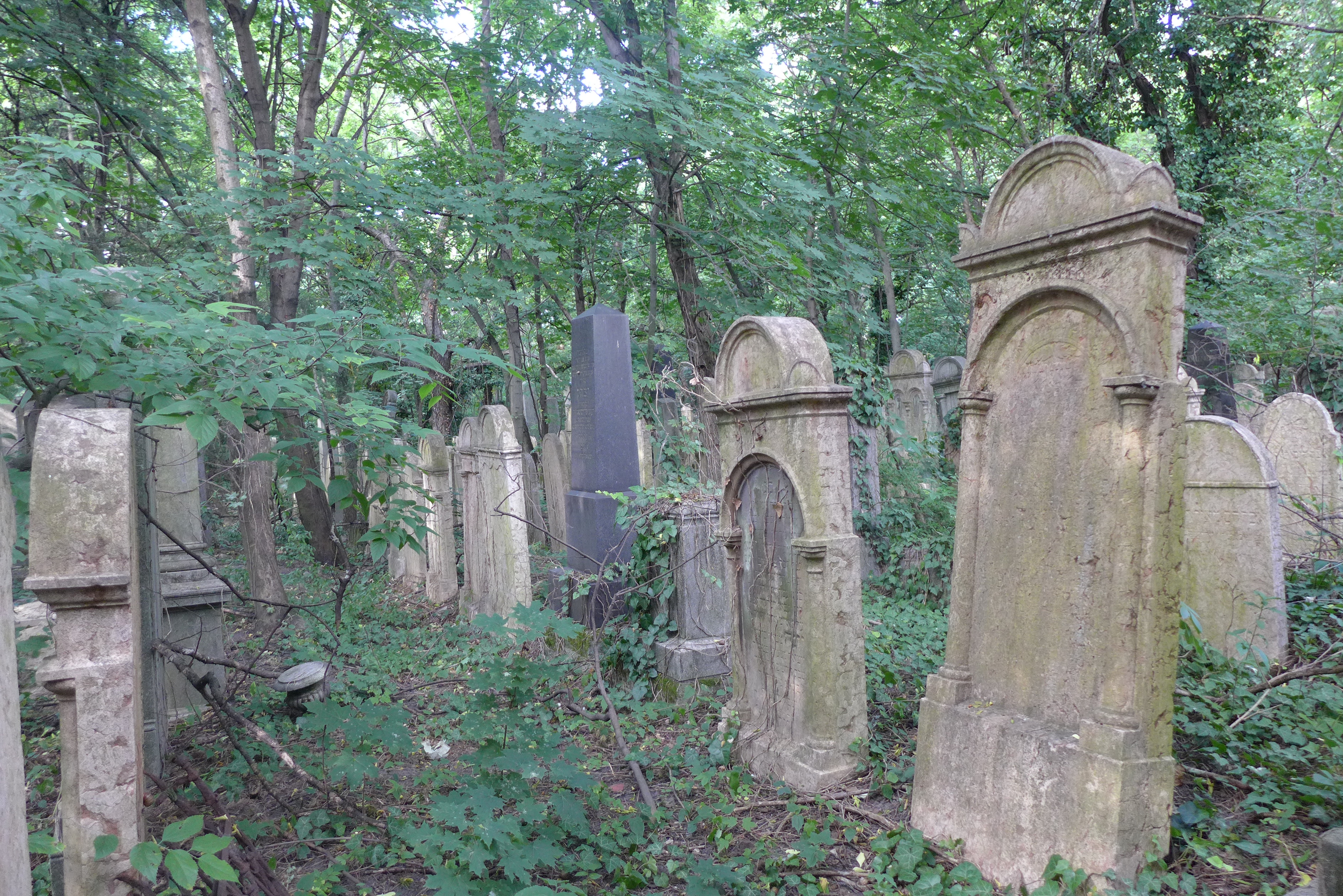

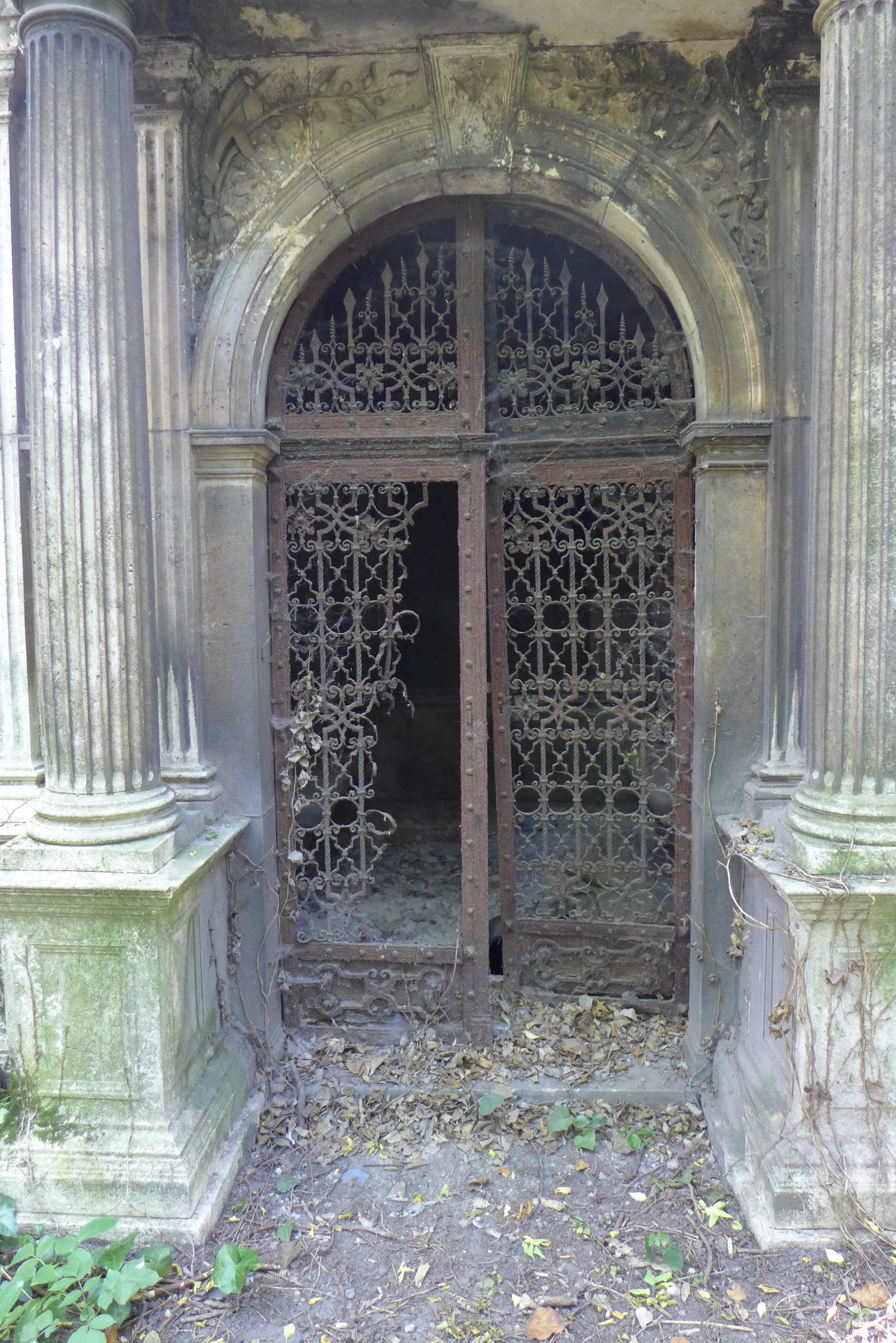

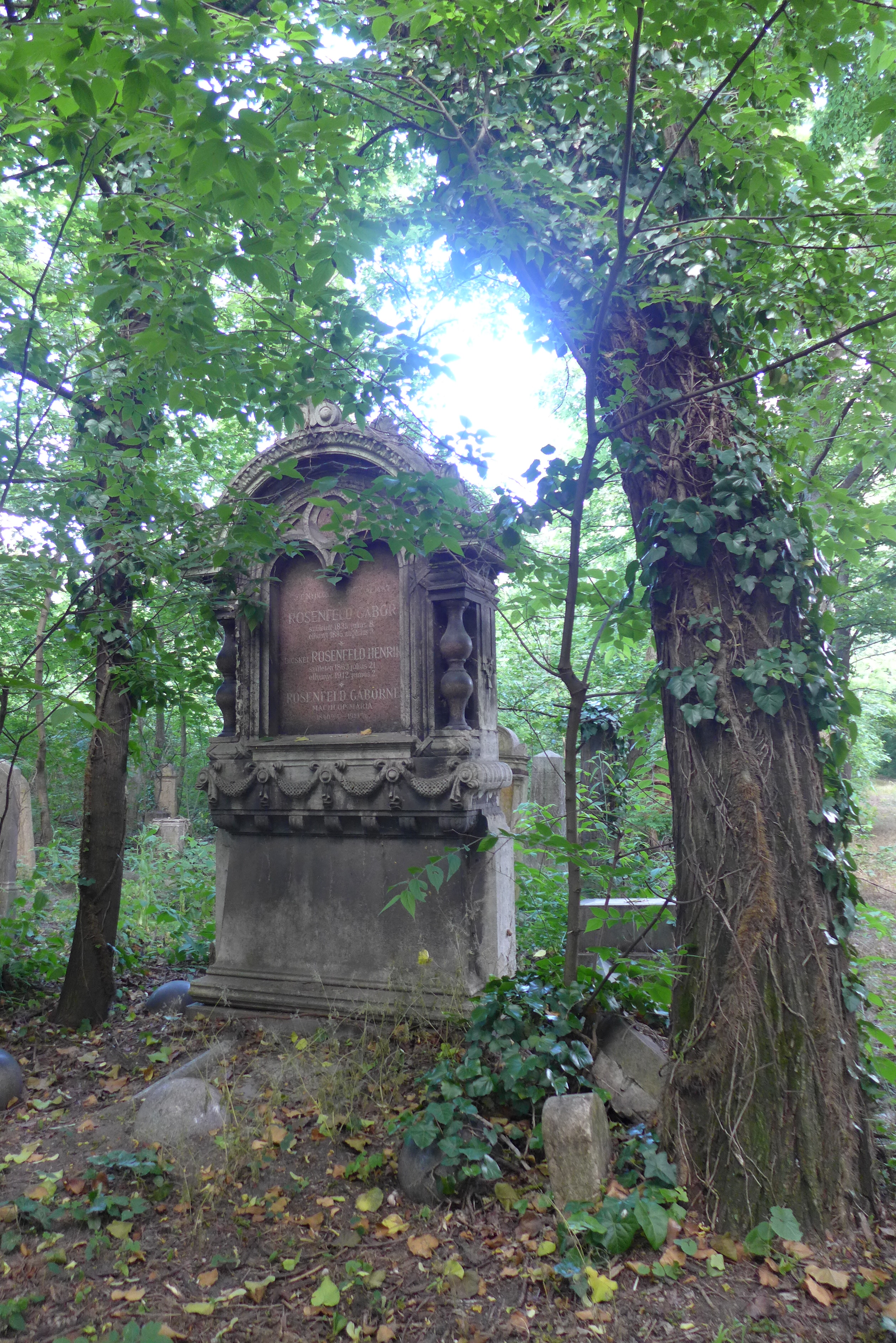

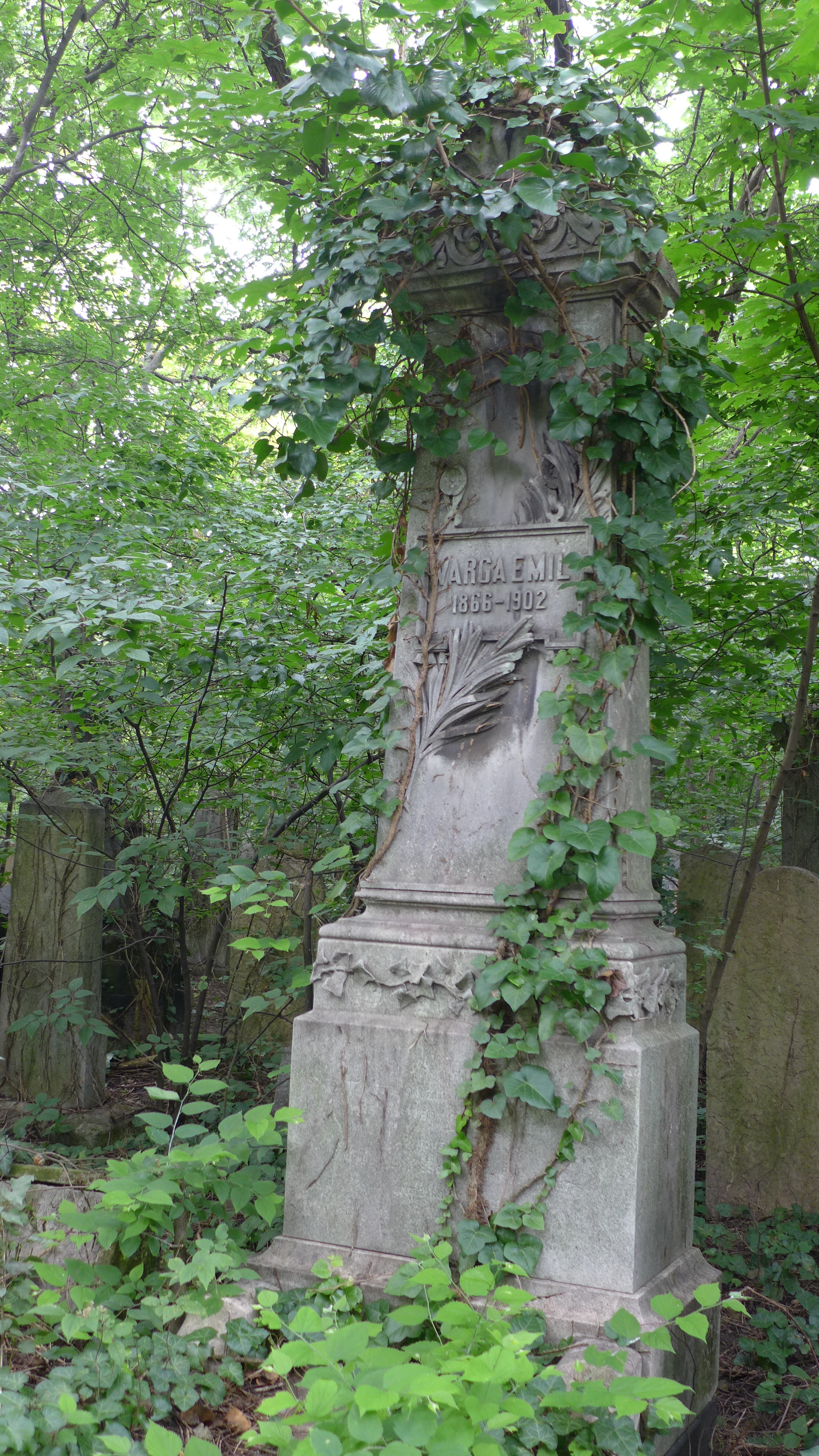

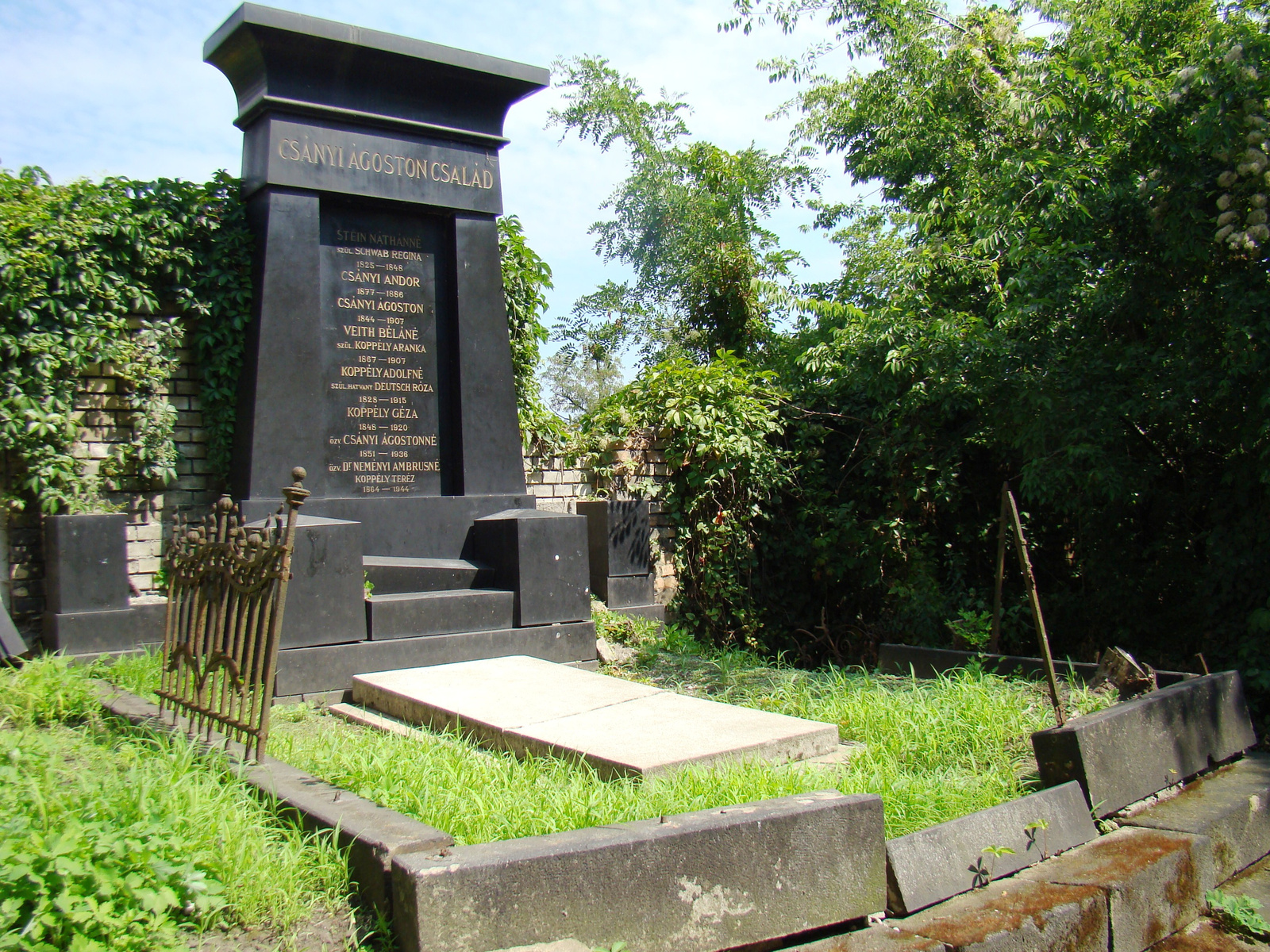

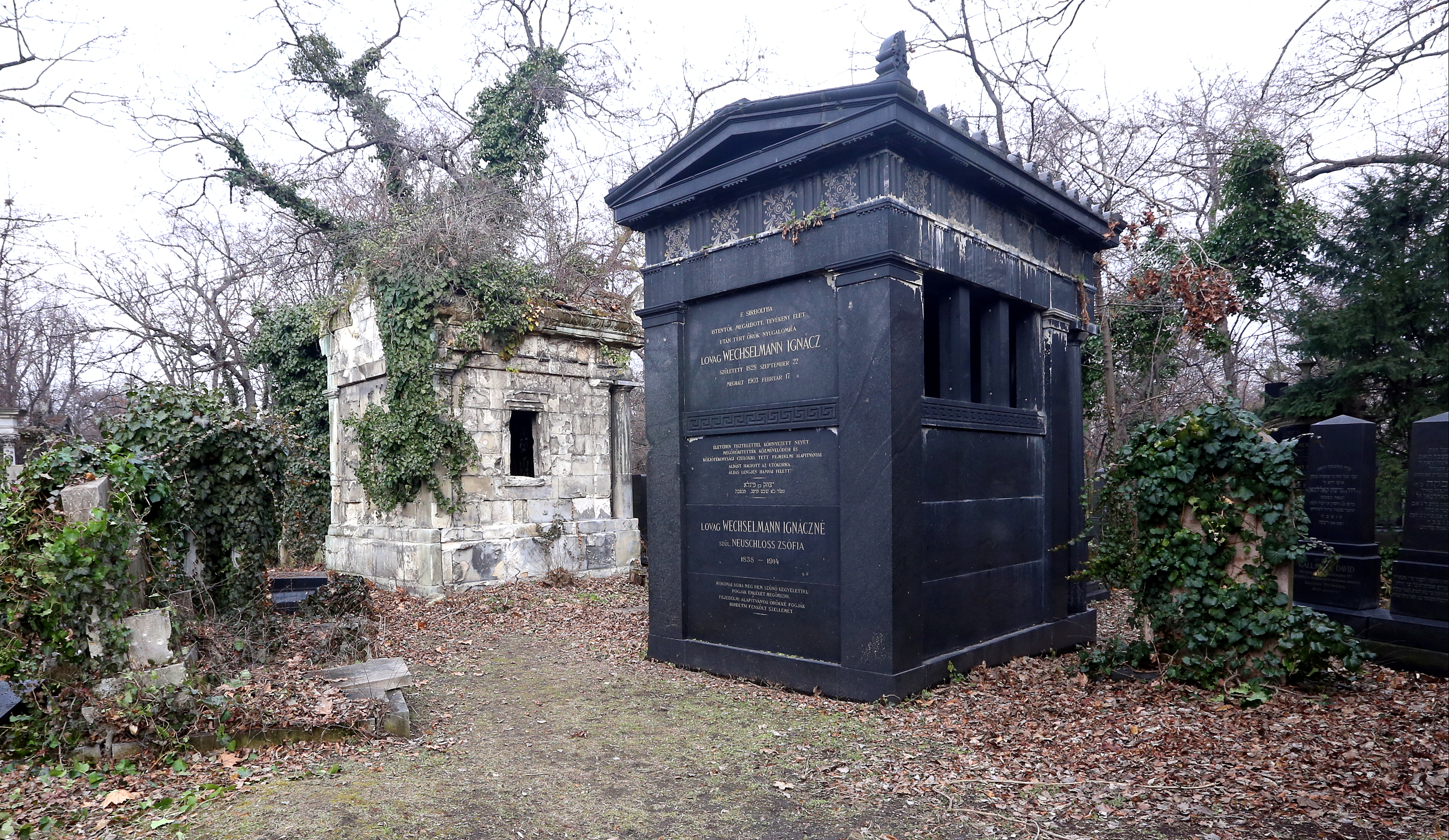

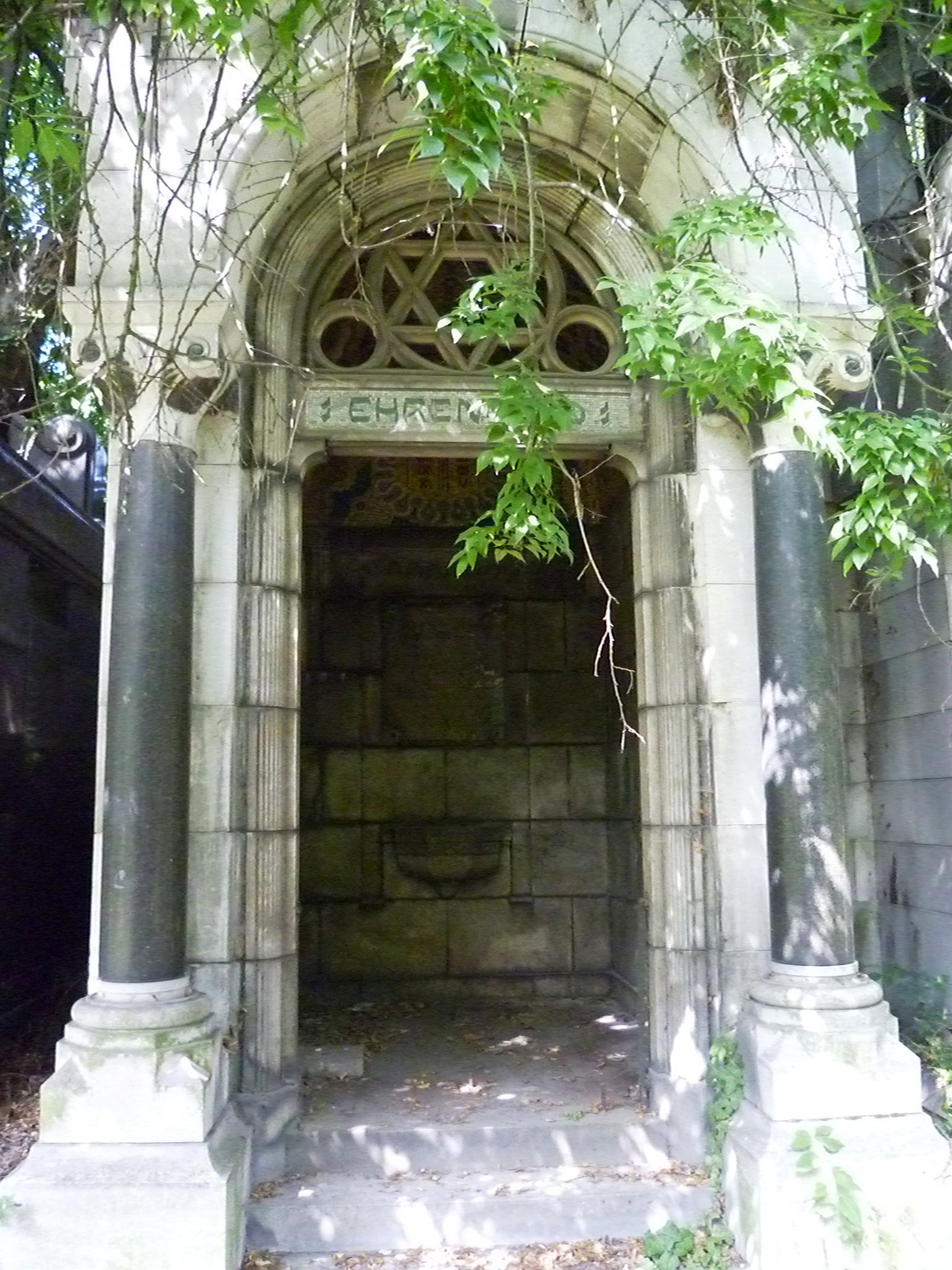

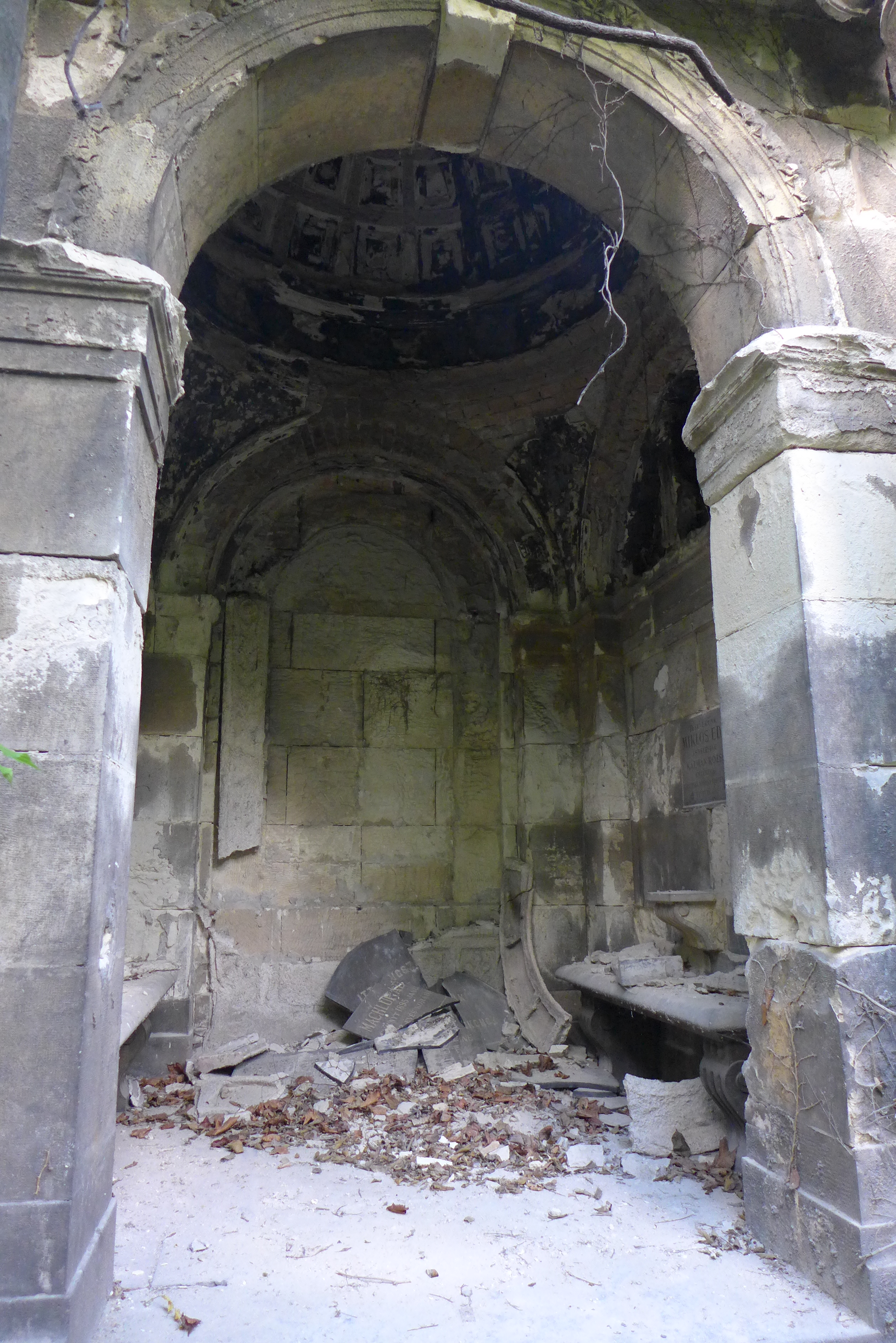

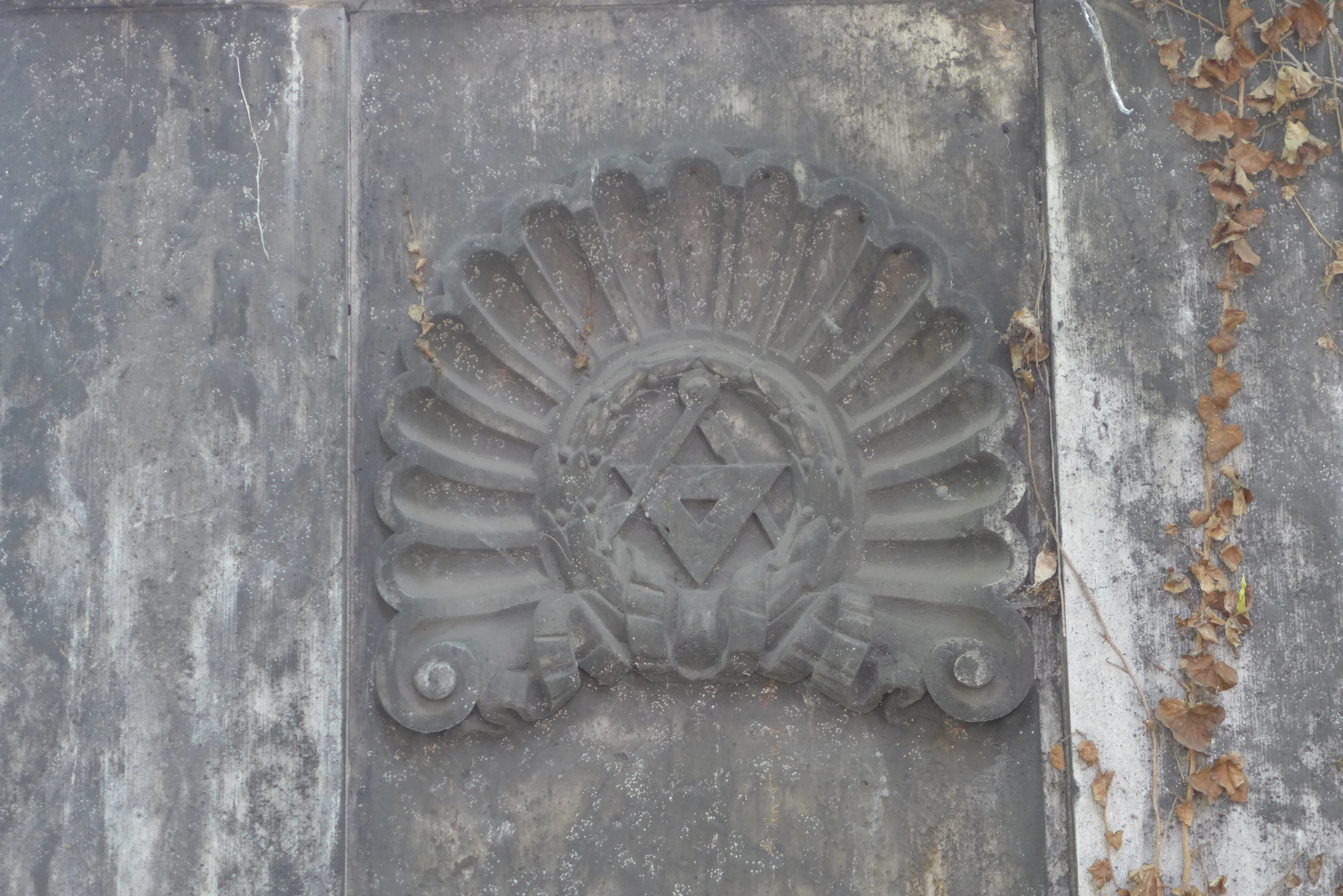

== Another literature ==
- "Lukácsi Attila: Felbecsülhetetlen értékeket rejtenek a fővárosi zsidó temetők". mult-kor.hu.
- "Esemény – Séta a Salgótarjáni úti zsidó temetőben". magyarnarancs.hu.
- "A Salgótarjáni úti zsidó temető épületei és a Lajta Béla által tervezett síremlékek". lajtaarchiv.hu. Archived from the original on 2022-03-23.
- "Izraelita temető". muemlekem.hu.
- "Ideiglenesen zárták be a páratlan sírkertet". muemlekem.hu.
- "Vizler Imre fényképgyűjteménye". fszek.hu.
- Tóth Vilmos: A Salgótarjáni utcai zsidó temető, Nemzeti Örökség Intézete, Budapest, 2014, ISBN 9789630888325
- Fullér Andrea: Egyiptizáló síremlékek a budapesti zsidó temetőkben a 19–20. század fordulóján
- (szerk.) Dr. Fogarasi Katalin – Haraszti György: Zsidó síremlékek Budapesten, Nemzeti Kegyeleti Bizottság, Budapest, 2004, ISBN 963-214-895-9
- Az örökkévalóság háza. Ismeretterjesztő magazin a Salgótarjáni Utcai Zsidó Temetőről, Nemzeti Kegyeleti Bizottság, Budapest, 2017
- Tóth Vilmos: „Nemzeti nagylétünk nagy temetője”. A Fiumei úti sírkert és a Salgótarjáni utcai zsidó temető adattára, Nemzeti Örökség Intézete, Budapest, 2018
- Hüttl Sarolta: A Salgótarjáni úti izraelita temető helyreállítása (epiteszforum.hu, 2014. ápr. 4.)
- Csáki Tamás: A Salgótarjáni utcai temető – a pesti zsidó közösség sírkertje, 1874–1890 In: Urbs – Magyar Várostörténeti Évkönyv 12., Budapest, 2017
- Csáki Tamás: A Salgótarján utcai zsidó temető 1892 utáni története In: Urbs – Magyar Várostörténeti Évkönyv 13., Budapest, 2019

== Video ==
- Ismeretlen temető Budapest közepén (youtube.com)
- Torma Tamás építész bemutatja a temetőt
