= Fiume Road Graveyard =

Cemetery in Budapest, Hungary

Coordinates: 47°29′45″N 19°5′26″E

Kerepesi Cemetery
- Fiume Road Graveyard; Kerepesi (úti) temető Fiumei úti nemzeti sírkert
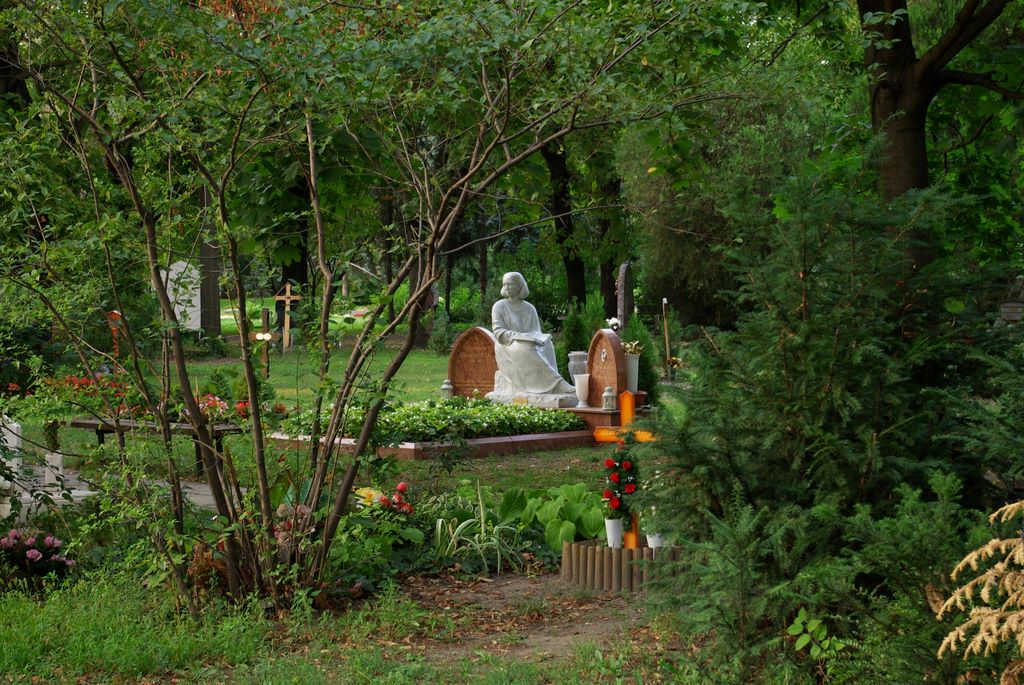
- The cemetery in 2007
- Interactive map of Kerepesi Cemetery

Details
- Established: 1847; 179 years ago
- Location: Józsefváros, Budapest
- Country: Hungary
- Type: Closed to new burials
- Size: 56 hectares (140 acres)
- Website: Btirt.hu

Kerepesi Cemetery (Hungarian: Kerepesi (úti) temető [ˈkɛrɛpɛʃi (ˈuːti) ˈtɛmɛtøː]), officially known as Fiume Road National Graveyard (Fiumei úti nemzeti sírkert), is the most famous cemetery in Budapest. It is one of the oldest cemeteries in Hungary, and has been almost completely preserved.

== Overview ==
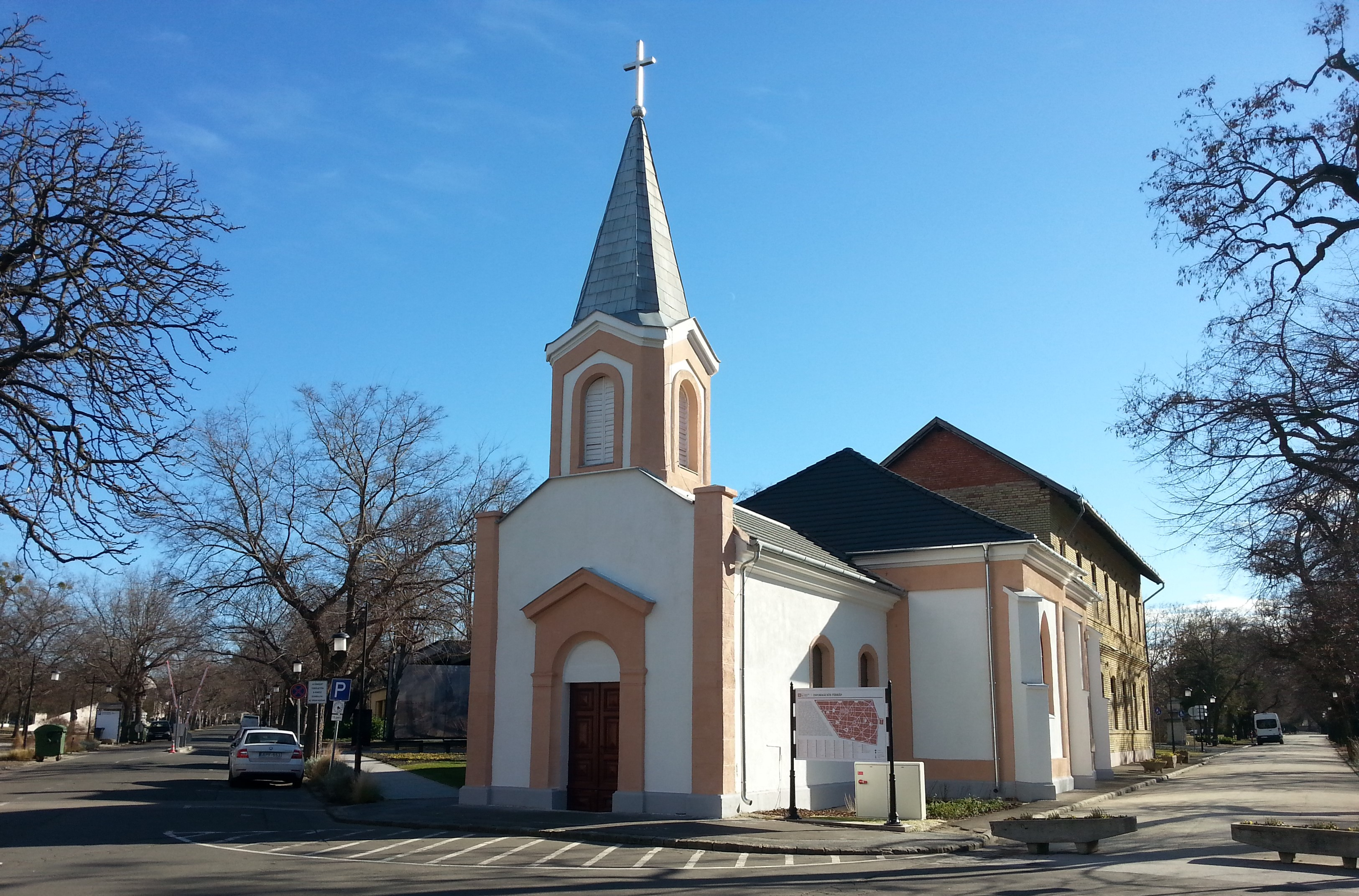
Cemetery chapel (Lőrinc Zofahl, 1857)

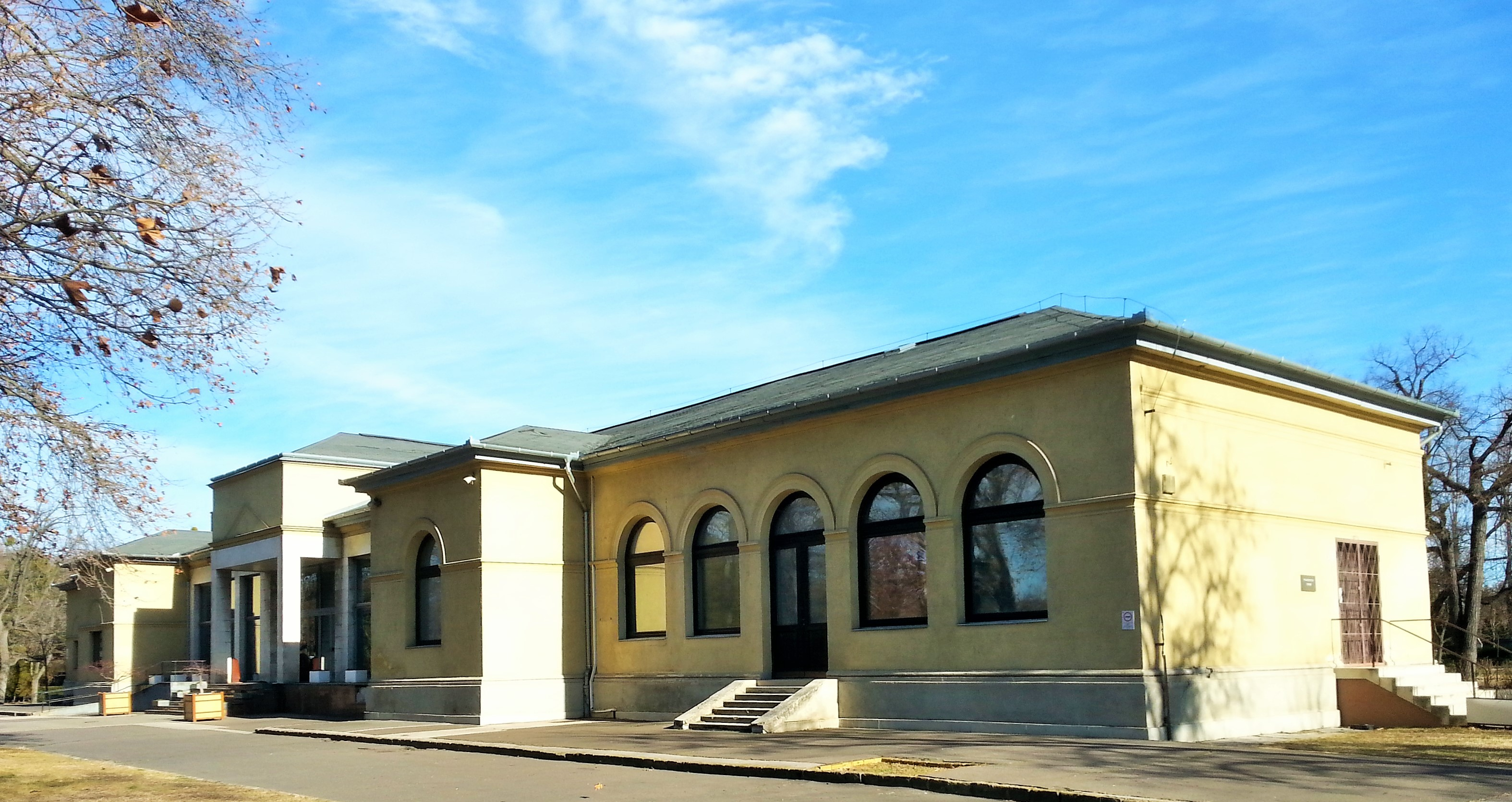
Mortuary (Hugó Máltás, 1880)

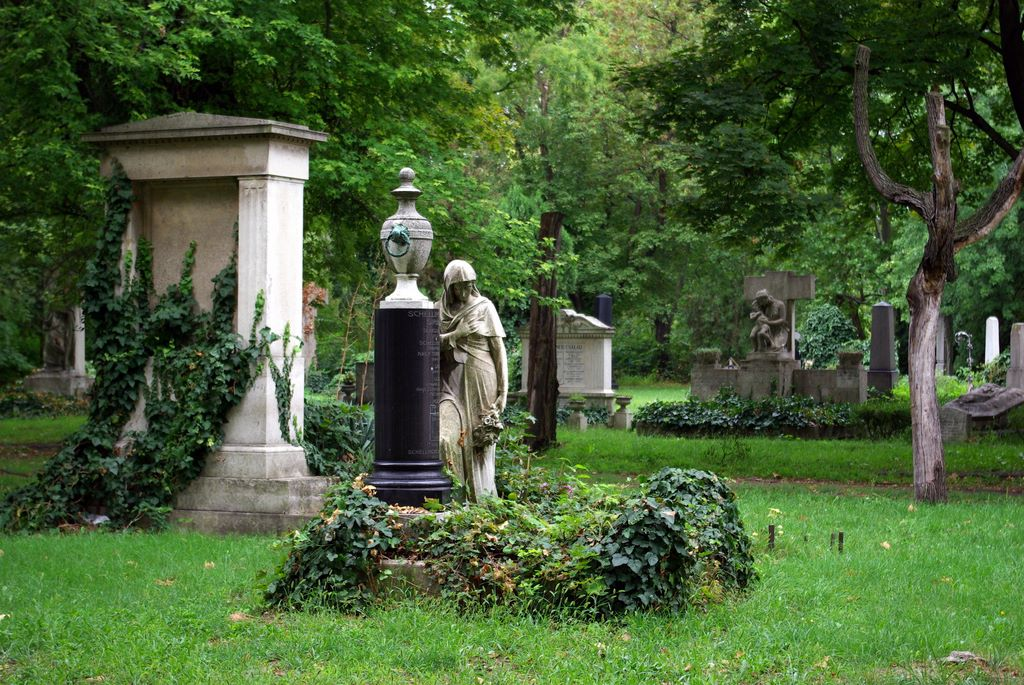
Kerepesi Cemetery

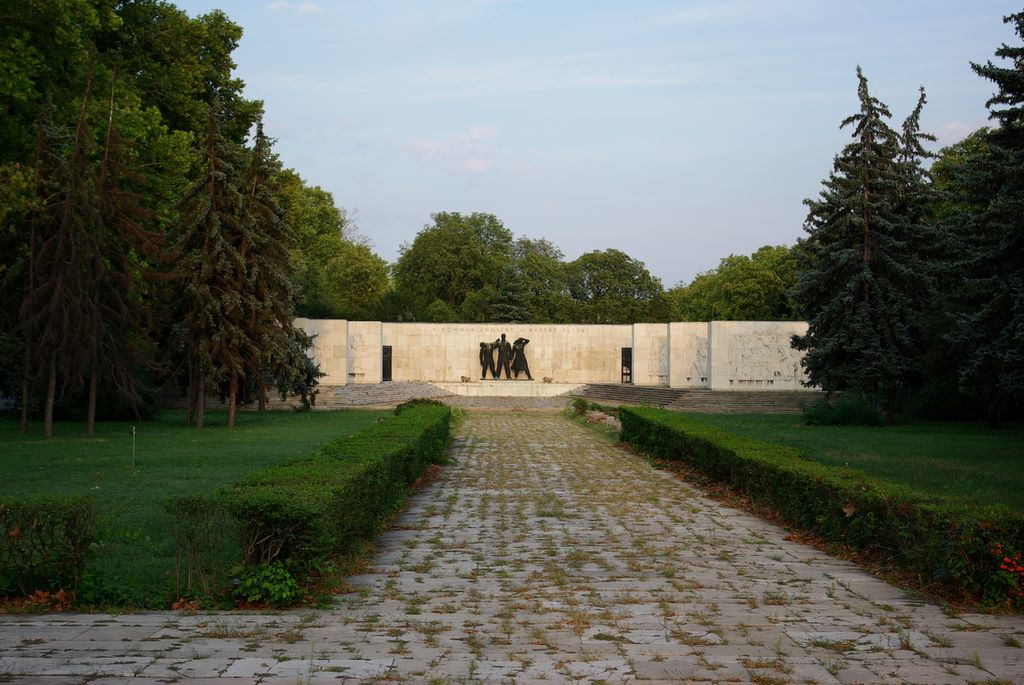
Labor Movement Mausoleum on Kerepesi Cemetery 1. Sculpture: Olcsai-Kiss Zoltán

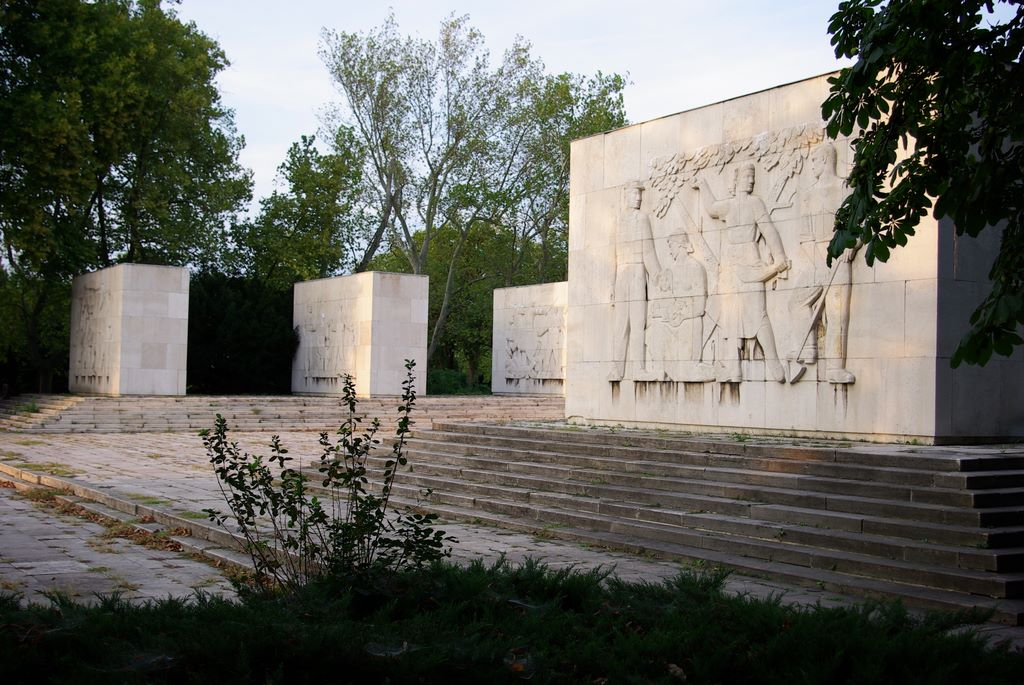
Labor Movement Mausoleum on Kerepesi Cemetery 2

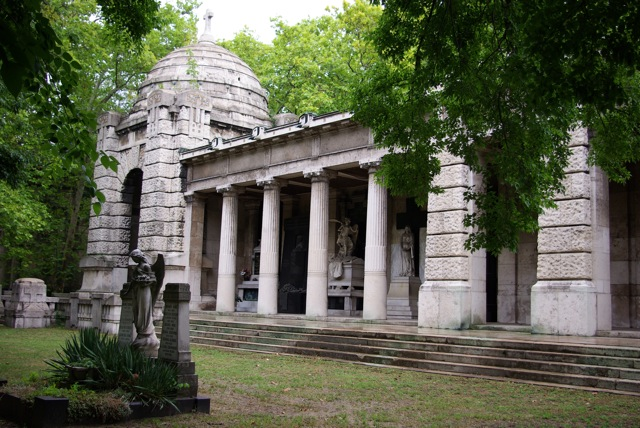
Kerepesi Cemetery Arcades 1

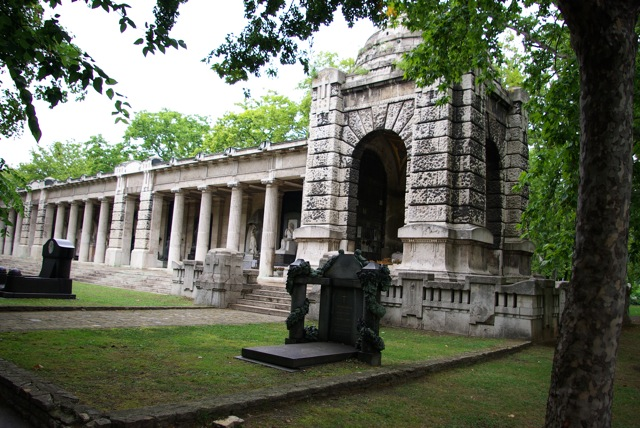
Kerepesi Cemetery Arcades 2

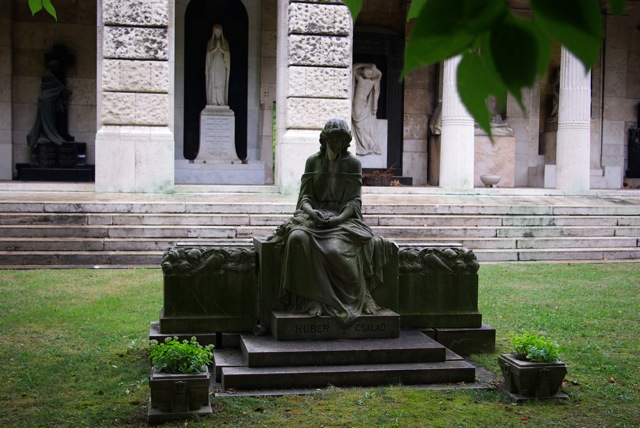
Kerepesi Cemetery Arcades 3

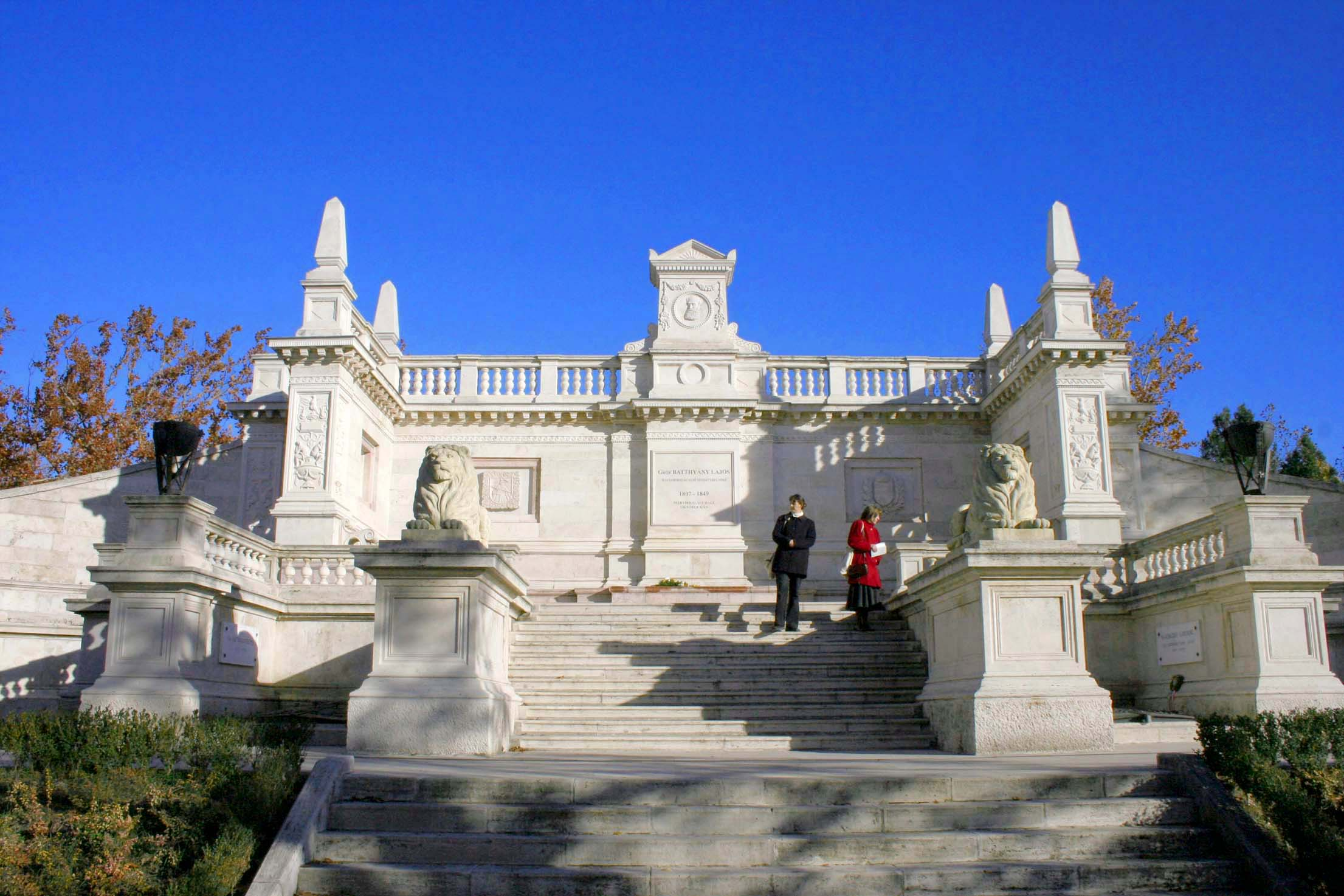
Batthyány mausoleum

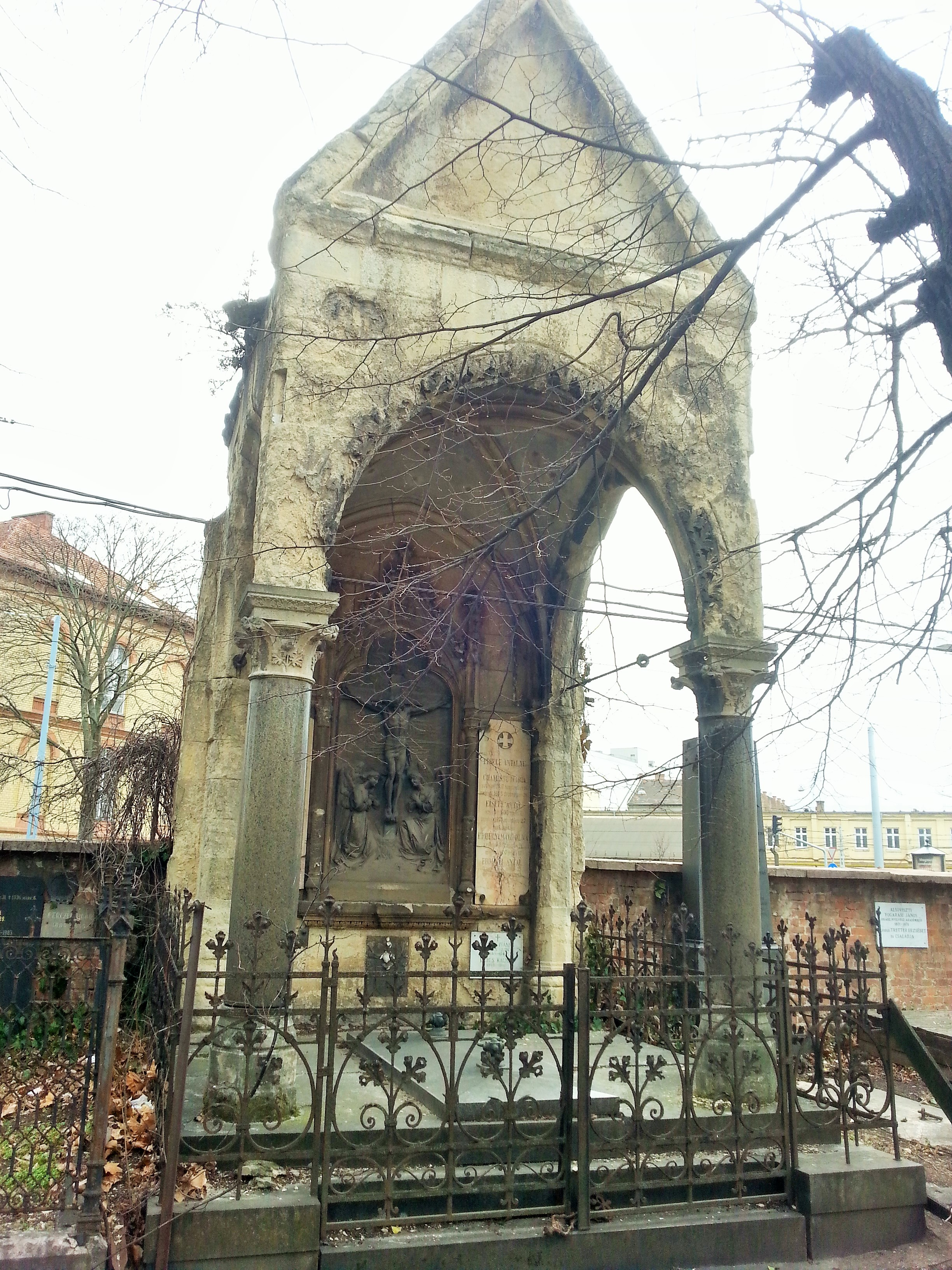
Eisele-Jálics mausoleum

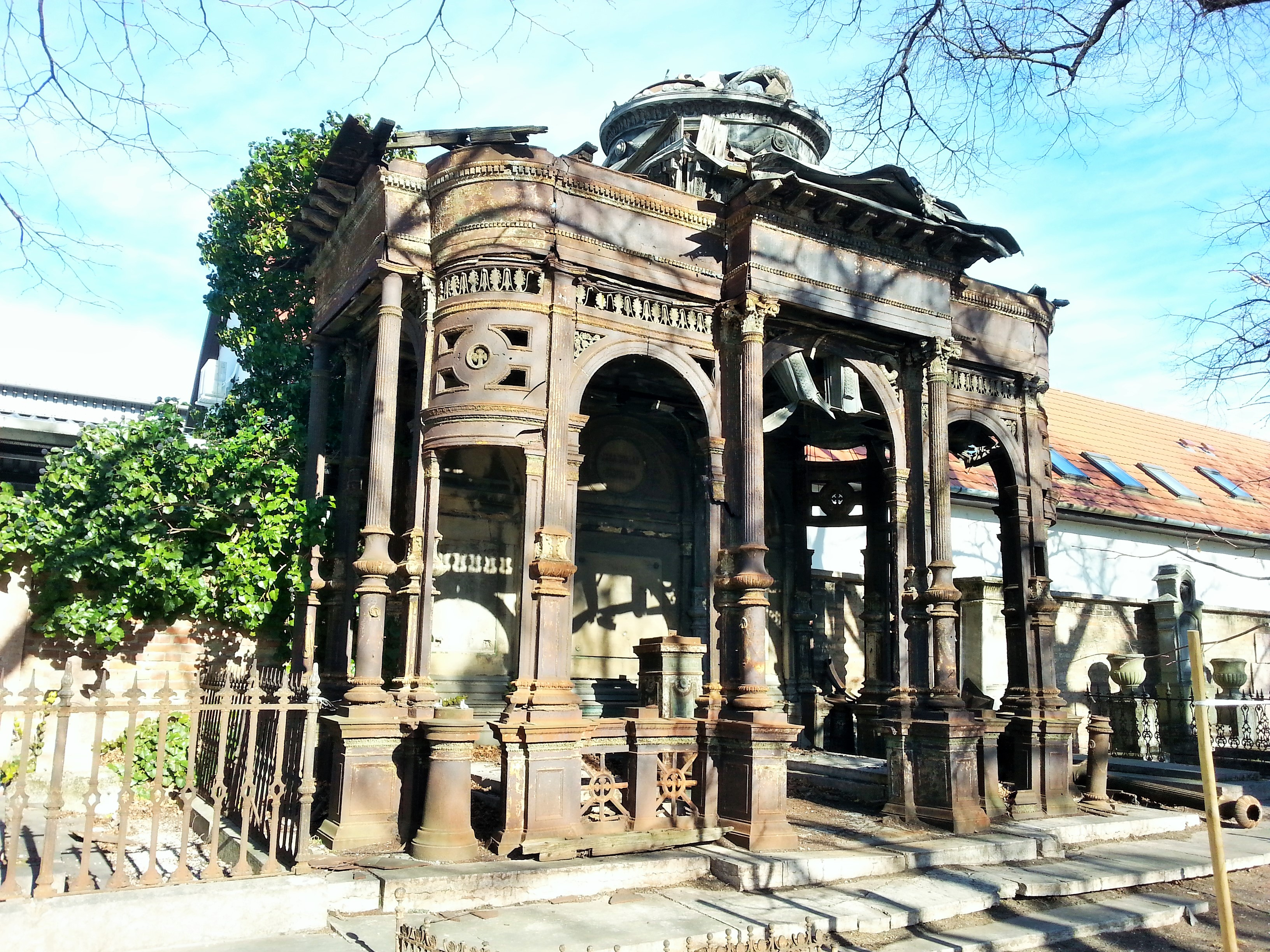
Lyka mausoleum

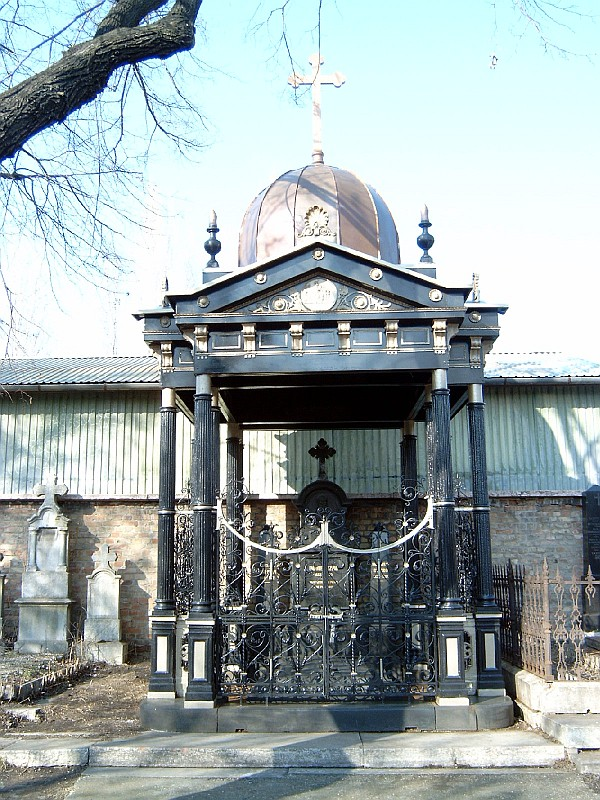
Gozsdu mausoleum

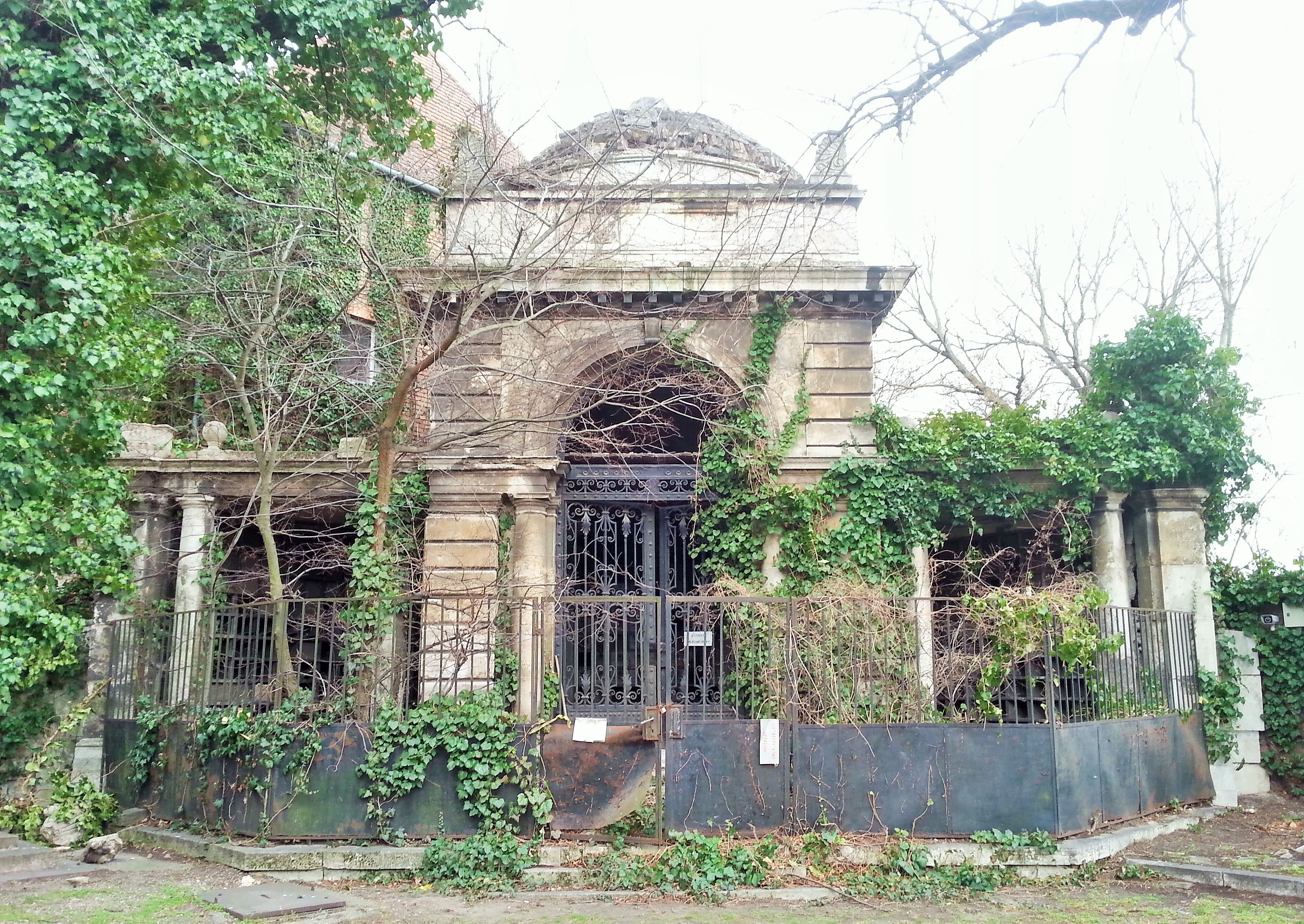
Thalmayer mausoleum

Founded in 1847, Kerepesi is located in outer Józsefváros, near Keleti pályaudvar (Eastern Railway Station), and can be reached via Budapest Metro line 2. It is the innermost cemetery of Budapest, although it still lies about 2 km from the downtown centre. Kerepesi is one of the biggest national pantheons in Europe and the biggest outdoor statue park with its area of about 56 hectares (0.56 km^{2}). It is sometimes referred to as the Père Lachaise of Budapest.

The cemetery's first burial took place some two years after its opening, in 1849. Since then numerous Hungarian notables (statesmen, writers, sculptors, architects, artists, composers, scientists, actors and actresses etc.) have been interred there, several of them in ornate tombs or mausoleums. This was encouraged by the decision of the municipal authorities to declare Kerepesi a "ground of honour" in 1885. The first notable burial was that of Mihály Vörösmarty in 1855.

Until the 1940s, several tombs were removed to this cemetery from others in Budapest – for example, it is the fourth resting place of the poet Attila József.

The cemetery was declared closed for burials in 1952. This was partly because it had become damaged during World War II, and partly for political reasons, as the Communist government sought to play down the graves of those who had "exploited the working class". At one point it was intended to build a housing estate over the cemetery. Part of the grounds were in fact handed over to a nearby rubber factory and were destroyed in 1953.

In 1958, a Mausoleum for the Labour movement was created by Olcsai-Kiss Zoltán. During the Communist period (which lasted from 1948 till 1989 in Hungary) this was the only part of the cemetery highlighted or even mentioned by the authorities. After the fall of communism, Kerepesi was still considered by some to be a Communist cemetery (for example a son of Béla Bartók forbade his father's ashes to be interred there).

The cemetery, with its extended parks among the graves and monuments, is open to the public, but interments have ceased.

The Salgotarjani Street Jewish Cemetery is actually the eastern corner of the Kerepesi Cemetery, but it is separated from it by a stone wall.

In summer 2007, some of the filming for The Boy in the Striped Pyjamas was completed at the cemetery.

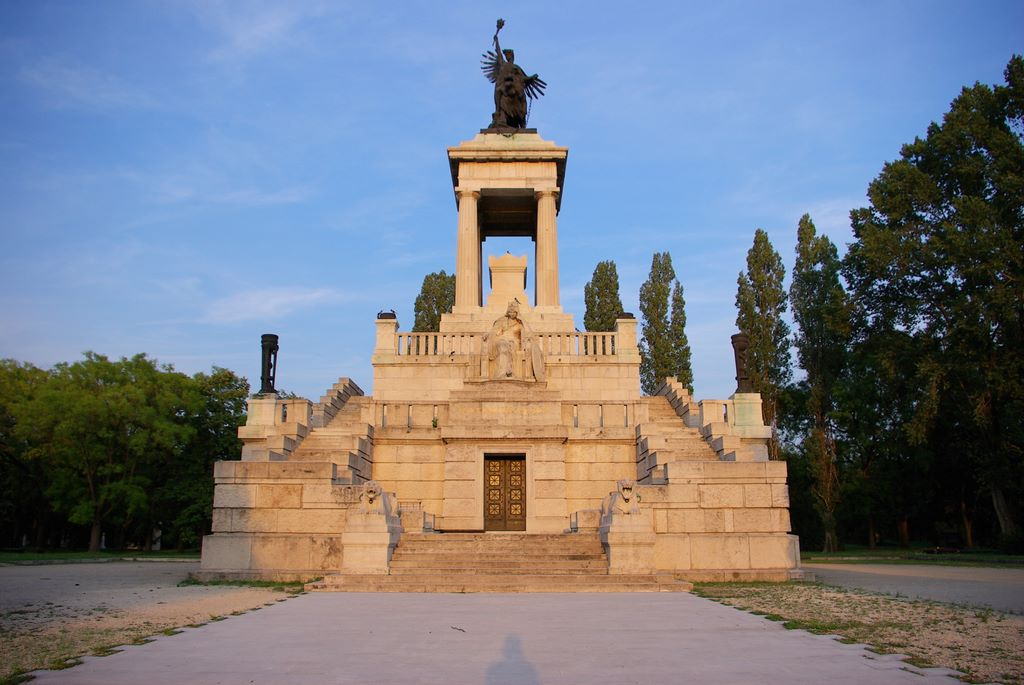
Lajos Kossuth Mausoleum on Kerepesi Cemetery

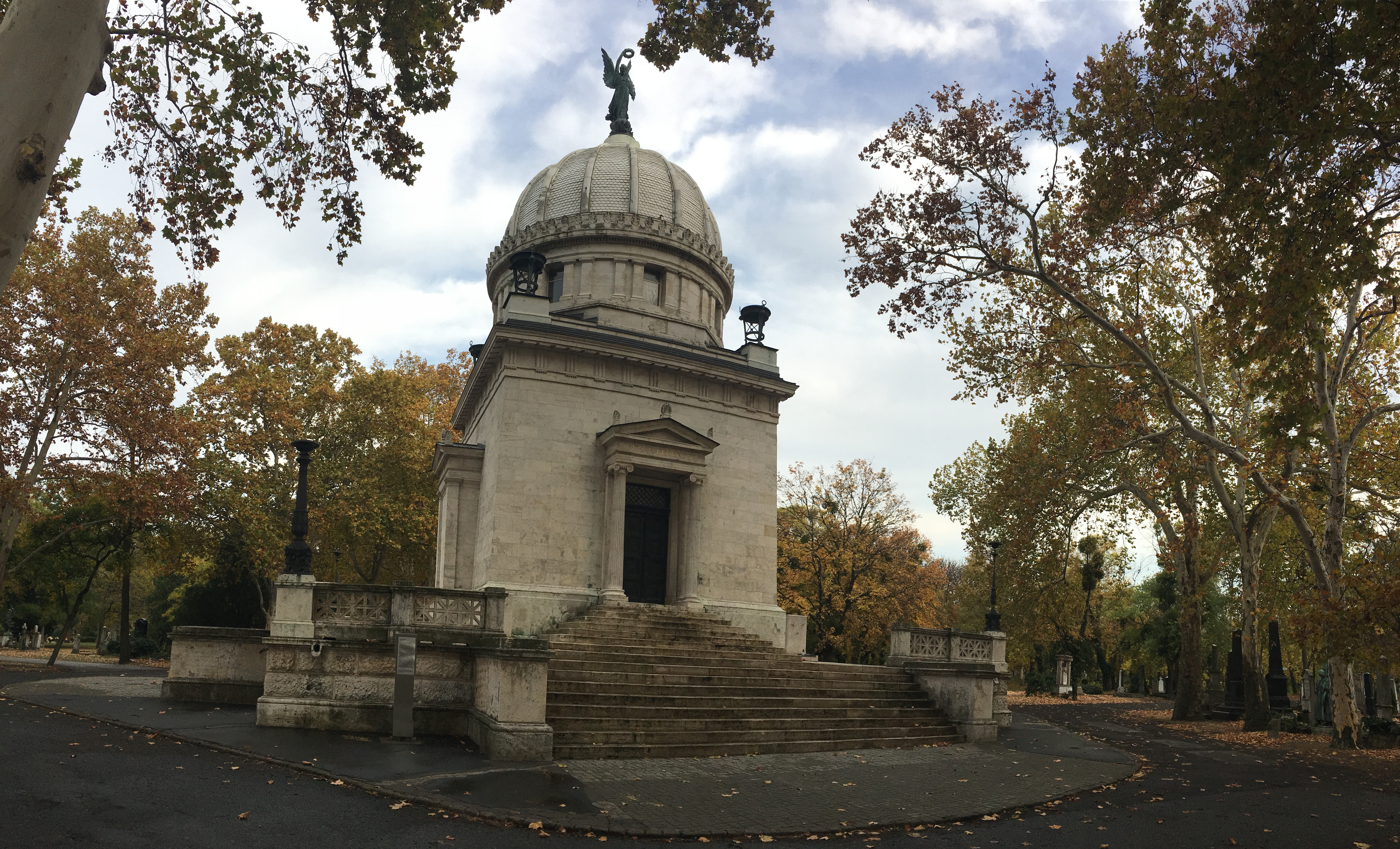
Ferenc Deák Mausoleum on Kerepesi Cemetery

== Special sections ==
In 1874, a special parcel was established for those who were denied a church funeral (those who committed suicide and those executed).

The cemetery is also famous for its arcades, built between 1908 and 1911, recalling the style of Northern Italian cemeteries.

The artists' sector – in which each tomb contains a notable Hungarian representative of the arts – was created in 1929.

== Interments ==
Kerepesi contains mausoleums of three leading Hungarian statesmen:

- Lajos Batthyány
- Ferenc Deák (1876, designed by Kálmán Gerster, the stained glass by Miksa Róth)
- Lajos Kossuth (1894, Kálmán Gerster, sculptures by Alajos Stróbl)

also, the mausoleum of Ábrahám Ganz (iron-foundry pioneer in Hungarian heavy industry), built to the plans of Miklós Ybl in 1868.

Other interments include:

- Endre Ady (poet)
- Ignác Alpár (architect)
- József Antall (Prime Minister, historian)
- János Arany (poet)
- Mihály Babits (poet)
- Béla Balázs (writer, film aesthete)
- Miklós Barabás (painter)
- Jenő Barcsay (painter)
- Gedeon Barcza (chess grandmaster)
- István Bethlen (Prime Minister)
- Lujza Blaha (actress, "the nightingale of the nation")
- Ottó Bláthy (electrical engineer)
- Ferenc Chorin (politician and industrialist)
- Adam Clark (civil engineer)
- Tivadar Csontváry Kosztka (painter)
- Gergely Czuczor (linguist, poet)
- Dezső Szabó (linguist, writer)
- Béni Egressy (composer)
- Loránd Eötvös (physicist)
- Ferenc Erkel (composer)
- János Fadrusz (sculptor)
- György Faludy (writer, poet, translator)
- Ferenc Fejtő (journalist, political scientist)
- Károly Ferenczy (painter, along with Béni Ferenczy and Noémi Ferenczy, his brother and sister)
- Zsa Zsa Gabor (actress and socialite, along with her mother)
- János Garay (poet)
- Artúr Görgei (general)
- Alajos Hauszmann (architect)
- Jenő Heltai (writer)
- George de Hevesy (Nobel Prize winner chemist)
- Gyula Horn (Prime Minister of Hungary (1994–1998))
- Miklós Izsó (sculptor)
- Mari Jászai (actress)
- Mór Jókai (writer)
- Attila József (poet)
- János Kádár (leader of Communist Hungary (1957–1988))
- Pál Kadosa (composer)
- Kálmán Kandó (inventor, engineer)
- Mihály Károlyi (President)
- Károly Mária Kertbeny (writer, translator, coined the words "heterosexual" and "homosexual")
- Géza Kertész (football player and manager, anti-fascist resistant – reburied 1946)
- Károly Kisfaludy (poet, dramatist, painter)
- Dezső Kosztolányi (poet, writer)
- Gyula Krúdy (writer)
- Ödön Lechner (architect)
- Lipót Fejér (mathematician)
- Károly Lotz (painter)
- György Lukács (philosopher)
- Viktor Madarász (painter)
- Ferenc Mádl (President of Hungary (2000–2005), jurist)
- Ignác Martinovics (Franciscan, leader of the Hungarian Jacobin movement)
- Ferenc Medgyessy (sculptor)
- László Mednyánszky (painter)
- Kálmán Mikszáth (writer)
- Zsigmond Móricz (writer)
- Mihály Munkácsy (painter)
- Arthur J. Patterson (academic)
- Karl Polanyi (economist)
- Tivadar Puskás (engineer, inventor)
- Miklós Radnóti (poet)
- Frigyes Riesz (mathematician)
- Ignaz Semmelweis (doctor, "Saviour of Mothers")
- László Sólyom (President, jurist)
- Imre Steindl (architect)
- Alajos Stróbl (sculptor)
- Antal Szerb (writer)
- Leo Szilard (physicist)
- Mihály Táncsics (writer, politician)
- István Tóth (football player and manager, anti-fascist resistant – reburial in 1946)
- Ármin Vámbéry (linguist)
- Mihály Vörösmarty (poet) – his tomb is one of the oldest extant tombs: he was interred in 1855
- Leó Weiner (composer)
- Sándor Wekerle (Prime Minister three times)
- Miklós Ybl (architect)
- György Zala (sculptor)
- Mihály Zichy (painter, graphic artist)

== See also ==
- Farkasréti Cemetery

== Bibliography ==
- Lukacs Csernus and Zsigmond Triff, The Cemeteries of Budapest, Budapest, 1999. ISBN 963-8376-98-8

== Resources ==
- (in Hungarian) Múlt-kor article
