= Mattie the Goose-boy =

Mattie the Goose-boy or Lúdas Matyi may refer to:

- Mattie the Goose-boy (poem), Hungarian epic poem by Mihály Fazekas
- Mattie the Goose-boy (1950 film), Hungarian film based on the poem
- Mattie the Goose-boy (1977 film), Hungarian film based on the poem
- Lúdas Matyi (magazine), a Hungarian satirical weekly
