= Gustav (film series) =

- Genre: Adult animation
- Created by: Attila Dargay; József Nepp; Marcell Jankovics
- Composer: Tamás Deák
- Country of origin: Hungary
- Original language: Hungarian
- No. of seasons: 5
- No. of episodes: 120

Production
- Editors: János Czipauer; Magda Hap
- Running time: 6 minutes (1964-1968); 7 minutes (1975-1979)
- Production company: Pannonia Film Studio

Original release
- Network: Magyar Televízió
- Release: April 3, 1966 – May 12, 1979

Gustav, also known as Gustavus, (Hungarian Gusztáv, 1966-1979) was a Hungarian series of animated short cartoons (5 minutes) for adults.

Each episode tells an adventure of the title character, Gustav, related to the grey realities of urban life. Characteristic feature of the show was that episodes were independent: for example, Gustav is sometimes a bachelor, sometimes has a large family. In Eastern Europe and Yugoslavia the episodes were broadcast on TV in the 80s, usually as airtime filler. The series was also broadcast in Western Europe and even in New Zealand - because it was not using language, other than gibberish sound, it was able to easily transcend boundaries. In 2013 and 2014, Gusztáv was again broadcast in Croatia, on national television, usually as an airtime filler. However, over 40 episodes were broadcast between films in special Christmas/New Year film marathons.

== Episodes and character development ==
The first series (68 episodes) was made between 1964 and 1968 for silver screen. The second series (52 episodes) was made between 1975 and 1979 for TV. Pannonia Film Studio produced the series. The title character, Gustav, had a precursor in 1961, in an 8-minute cartoon Passion by József Nepp, in which the title character tries to quit smoking. Trio of well respected and award-winning authors, Dargay-Nepp-Jankovics, was responsible for the development of the quirky show. However, the title character debuted in the episode "Gusztáv, az "állatbarát"

In Hungary, some episodes were released on DVD.
