= Pannonia Film Studio =

Animation studio in Budapest, Hungary

- Industry: Animation
- Founded: 1951; 75 years ago
- Headquarters: Budapest, Hungary
- Key people: Attila Dargay

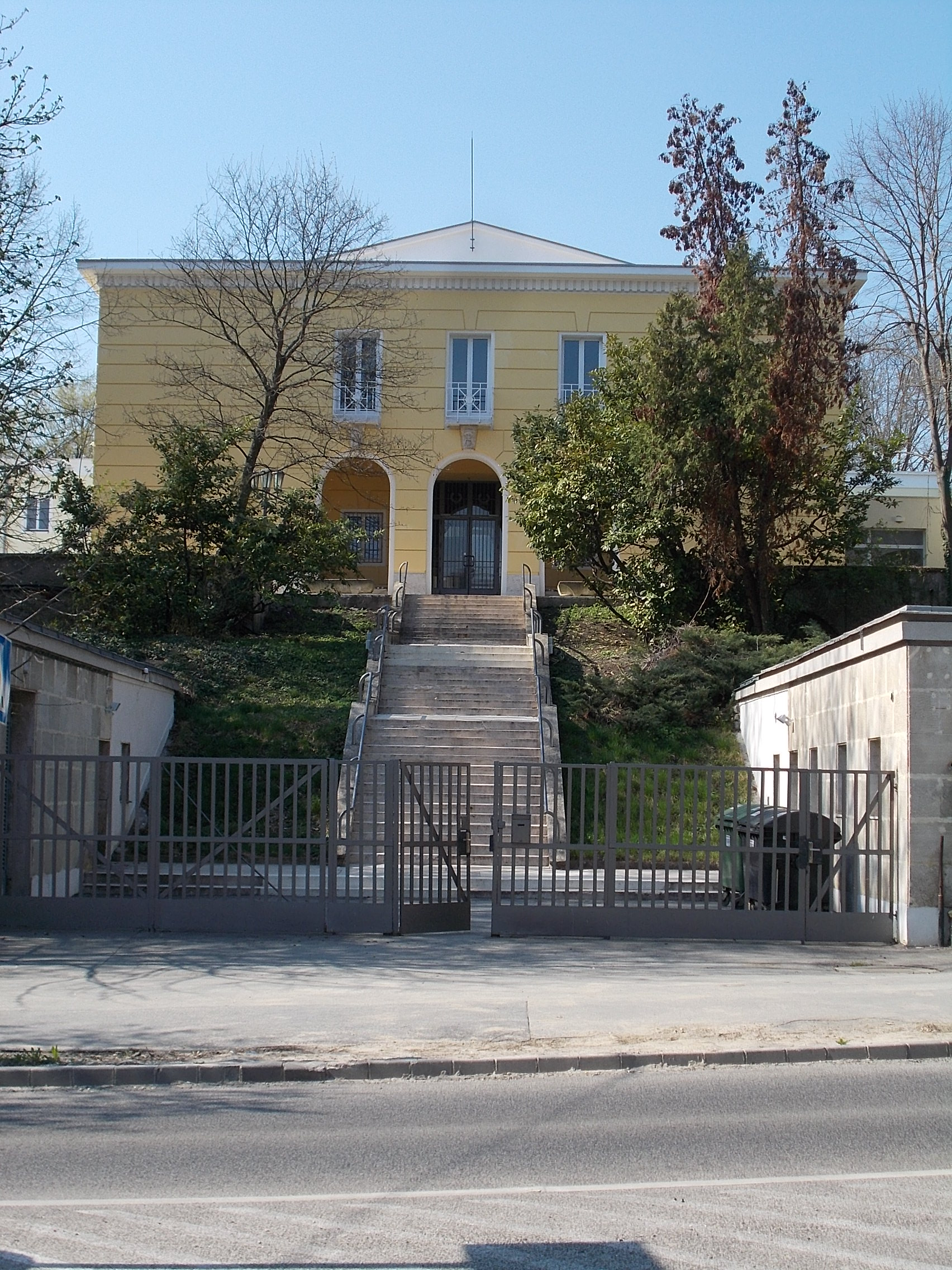
Historical Pannonia Film Studio at 1021 Budapest, Hűvösvölgyi út 64–66, Hungary.

Pannonia Film Studio (also known as MAFILM Pannónia Filmstúdió) was the largest animation studio in Hungary, based in the capital of Budapest. It was formed in 1951, becoming independent in 1957. The animation studio closed sometime around 2015. In 1981, Pannónia's three-minute production, The Fly (A légy) by Ferenc Rófusz, won the Academy Award for Best Animated Short Film.

== Legacy and redevelopment ==
In the late 2010s, the historic studio building was refurbished and repurposed for film and music post-production. The redeveloped site has been described as a post-production hub (Pannónia Film Centre), housing facilities for sound work, editing and music recording, including a larger studio suitable for orchestral sessions. The facility features Hungary's first Dolby Atmos studio and is specifically designed to accommodate full-scale symphonic film scores. Artists and composers who have recorded with the Pannonia Film Orchestra include Mark Isham, Attila Pacsay, Amadour, Eleanor Tomlinson, Raffaella Carrà, Cody Fry, and Hadiqa Kiani. The studio orchestra has also recorded soundtracks for Squid Game, The Nevers, Islands, The Story of My Wife, Blacklight, and Russian Doll. The Pannonia Film Orchestra (and the associated Pannonia Sound Studios) works with major international film houses and streaming platforms, including Netflix, Disney+, and HBO.

== Notable people ==
Pannónia Film's roster of notable animators includes Attila Dargay, Marcell Jankovics, József Gémes, Ottó Foky, Ferenc Rofusz, Gábor Csupó, Sándor Reisenbüchler, István Orosz, Líviusz Gyulai, Dóra Keresztes, and Zsolt Richly.

== Films ==
=== Animated short films ===
- A kiskakas gyémánt félkrajcárja ("The Cockerel's Diamond Coin") - Gyula Macskássy, 1951
- Ceruza és radír ("Pencil and India Rubber") - Gyula Macskássy-György Várnai, 1960
- A három nyúl ("The Three Rabbits") - Attila Dargay, 1972
- Sisyphus - Marcell Jankovics, 1974
- A légy ("The Fly") - Ferenc Rófusz, 1980

=== Animated series ===
- Gusztáv ("Gustav" or "Gustavus") - Dargay-Nepp-Jankovics, 1964
- Mézga család ("The Mézga Family") - József Nepp, József Romhányi (writer), 1969
- Frakk, a macskák réme ("Tails, The Terror of Cats") - Gyula Macskássy, András Cseh, István Imre, 1971
- A Kockásfülű nyúl - Zsolt Richly (director), Veronika Marék (writer), 1974
- Kérem a következőt ("Next, please!") - József Nepp (director, writer), Béla Ternovszky (director), József Romhányi (writer), 1974
- Magyar népmesék ("Hungarian Folk Tales") - Marcell Jankovics, 1977
- Vízipók-csodapók ("Water-Spider, Wonder-Spider") - Szabolcs Szabó, Szombati Szabó Csaba, József Haui, 1978
- Pom Pom meséi ("Tales of Pom Pom") - Attila Dargay (director), István Csukás (writer), 1980
- Meister Eder und sein Pumuckl - Ulrich König (director), 1982
- Leó és Fred ("Leo and Fred") - Pál Tóth, 1984
- Mecki und seine Freunde - Béla Ternovszky, 1995

=== Full-length animated films ===
- János vitéz ("Johnny Corncob") - Marcell Jankovics, 1973
- Hugo, a víziló ("Hugo the Hippo") - Bill Feigenbaum, 1975
- Lúdas Matyi ("Mattie the Gooseboy") - Attila Dargay, 1977
- Habfürdő ("Foam Bath"; "Bubble Bath") - György Kovásznai, 1979
- Fehérlófia ("The Son of the White Mare") - Marcell Jankovics, 1981
- Vuk ("The Little Fox") - Attila Dargay, 1981
- Time Masters ("Az Idő urai") - René Laloux, Tibor Hernádi (technical director), 1982 (French-Hungarian co-production)
- Suli-buli ("Schooltime Blues") - Ferenc Varsányi, 1982
- Vízipók-csodapók ("Water-Spider, Wonder-Spider") - Szabolcs Szabó, József Haui, Szombati Szabó Csaba, 1982
- Háry János ("John the Boaster") - Zsolt Richly, 1983
- Misi mókus kalandjai ("The Adventures of Sam the Squirrel") - Ottó Foky, 1983
- Hófehér ("No-White") - József Nepp, 1983
- Daliás idők ("Heroic Times") - József Gémes, 1984
- Szaffi ("The Treasure of Swamp Castle") - Attila Dargay, 1984
- Mátyás, az igazságos ("Matthias the Just") - László Ujváry, 1985
- Egy kutya feljegyzései ("Gréti...!") - József Nepp, 1986
- Macskafogó ("Cat City") - Béla Ternovszky, 1986
- Es lebe Servatius ("Long Live Servatius") - Ottó Foky, 1986
- Nefelejcs ("Forget-Me-Not") - Elek Lisziák, 1988
- Az erdõ kapitánya ("The Captain of the Forest") - Attila Dargay, 1988
- Felix the Cat: The Movie - Tibor Hernádi, 1988
- Vili, a veréb ("Willy the Sparrow") - József Gémes, 1989
- Sárkány és papucs ("Dragon and Slippers") - Tibor Hernádi, 1990
- A hetedik testvér ("The Seventh Brother") - Jenő Koltai, Tibor Hernádi, 1991
- A hercegnő és a kobold ("The Princess and the Goblin") - József Gémes, 1991
- Vacak 2 - az erdő hőse ("Tiny Heroes") - Jenő Koltai, József Gémes, 1997
- Ének a csodaszarvasról ("Song of the Miraculous Hind") - Marcell Jankovics, 2001
- The Princess and the Pea - Mark Swan, 2002 (American-Hungarian co-production)
- Macskafogó 2 - A sátán macskája ("Cat City 2: The Cat of Satan") - Béla Ternovszky, 2007
- Imre Madách's The Tragedy of Man - Marcell Jankovics, 2011

== Awards ==
- Forest Sports Contest by Gyula Macskássy: 1954 Paris - I. Prize
- Two Little Oxen by Gyula Macskássy: 1957 Warsaw - I. Prize
- Ball with White Dots by Tibor Csermák: 22nd Venice International Film Festival - Golden Lion
- Duel by Gyula Macskássy: 1961 Cannes Film Festival - Special Prize of the Jury
- Double Portrait by György Kovásznai: 1965 Mannheim - Golden Ducat
- Five Minute Thrill by József Nepp: 1967 Oberhausen - Main Prize
- Language Lesson by Béla Vajda: 1968 Oberhausen - Grand Prize
- Homo Faber by Tamás Szabó Sipos: 1968 Phnom-Penh - Golden Lion
- Concertissimo by József Gémes: 1968 Chicago - Silver Hugo
- Variations on a Dragon by Attila Dargay: 1968 Mamaia - Silver Pelican
- Urbanization by Gyula Macskássy: 1969 New York - Blue Ribbon Prize
- Deep Water by Marcell Jankovics: 1971 Annecy - Special Prize
- Success by Gyula Macskássy: 1972 Cracow - Special Prize
- 2 by Sándor Reisenbüchler: 1973 Cannes - Special Prize
- Modern Sports Coaching by Béla Ternovszky: 1974 Munich - Grand Prize
- Kidnapping of the Sun and the Moon by Sándor Reisenbüchler: 1974 New York - Special Prize of the Jury
- Let's Keep a Dog by Béla Ternovszky: 1975 New York - Category I.Prize
- Sisyphus by Marcell Jankovics: 1975 Teheran - Prize of the Critics
- Silence by István Orosz: 1977 Zagreb - The best first film
- Scenes With Beans by Ottó Foky: 1977 Lausanne - Grand Prix
- Fight by Marcell Jankovics: 1977 Cannes Film Festival - Palme d'Or
- New Tenants by Líviusz Gyulai: 1978 Cairo - Golden Nofretete
- I Think Life is a Great Fun... by Kati Macskássy: 1978 Melbourne - I.Prize
- Mattie the Gooseboy Attila Dargay: 1979 Salerno - Silver Cup
- The Fly by Ferenc Rófusz: 1980: Ottawa – Category Prize; 1981: Lille – Main Prize; 1981 Hollywood – Academy Award for Best Animated Short Film; 1982: Espinho – Category Prize
- Moto Perpetuo by Béla Vajda: 1981 Cannes Film Festival - Palme d'Or
- Animalia by Tibor Hernádi: 1981 Melbourne - Special Prize of the Jury
- The Luncheon by Csaba Varga: 1982 Lille - Grand Prix
- Vizipók-csodapók ("Water Spider Wonder Spider"): 1985 Kecskemét - Children's Prize,; 1988 Kecskemét - Jury's Diploma of Merit for backgrounds
- Gravitation by Ferenc Rófusz: 1984 Toronto - Category I. Prize
- Daliás idők ("Heroic Times") by József Gémes: 1985 Annecy - The best animated feature; Kecskemét - Best Animated Feature
- Snow-White József Nepp: 1984 Giffoni - Grand Prize
- Deadlock by Ferenc Rófusz: 1984 Stuttgart - Special Prize of the Jury
- Motorture by Ferenc Cakó: 1985 Antibes - Golden Siren
- Fények virradat elött ("Lights Before Dawn") by Sándor Békési: 1985 Espinho - Category Prize; 1988 Kecskemét - Best First Film
- Ah, Amerika! ("Ah, America!") by István Orosz: 1985 Kecskemét - Best Script; 1986 Oberhausen - Prize of International Film Clubs
- A szél ("The Wind") by Csaba Varga: 1987 Hiroshima - Category I. Prize; 1988 Kecskemét - Best Short Film, Best Music, and Best Graphic Design
- Magic by Dóra Keresztes: 1987 Espinho – Category Prize
- Ab Ovo by Ferenc Cakó: 1988 Cannes - The best animated film
- Dirt by Marcell Jankovics: 1989 Lille - Special Prize of the Jury
- Vili, a veréb ("Willy the Sparrow") by József Gémes: 1989 Chicago - Category II.Prize; 1993 Kecskemét - Prize of the Audience
- Isten Veled, Kis Sziget! ("Farewell, Little Island") by Sándor Reisenbüchler: 1988 Kecskemét - Kecskemét City Award; 1989 Lille - The best short film
- Vigyázat lépcső! ("Mind the Steps!") by István Orosz: 1991 Győr – Mediawave, Main Prize; Los Angeles - International Tournée of Animation; 1993 Kecskemét - Best Short Film
- Ad Rem by Ferenc Cakó: 1991 San Francisco - Category I.Prize
- The Princess and the Goblin by József Gémes: 1994 Fort Lauderdale - The best film for children
- Ecotopia by Sándor Reisenbüchler: 1997 Cairo - Silver Cairo
- A kalókoz szeretője ("The Lover of Pirates") by Zsofia Péterffy: 2002 Venezia - Prix UIP; Kecskemét - Grand Prix
- Ének a csodaszarvasról ("Song of the Miraculous Hind") by Marcell Jankovics: 2002 Kecskemét - Award of the National Radio and Television Commission
