= József Romhányi =

- Born: 8 March 1921; Nagytétény, Hungary
- Died: 7 May 1983 (aged 62); Budapest, Hungary
- Occupations: Poet; writer; translator
- Writing career
- Language: Hungarian
- Notable works: A Mézga család, Dr. Bubó

József Romhányi (8 March 1921 – 7 May 1983) was a Hungarian writer, poet, translator, and artist.

Originally he wanted to be a musician and learned viola in the Székesfővárosi Felsőbb Zenei Iskola musical school. From 1951 he worked as a playreader on Hungarian Radio, and in 1957 he became the director of the art department of the Hungarian State Concert and Programme Directorate. Between 1960 and 1962 he was the director of the popular art section of Hungarian Television. From 1962 he was a playreader in the Main Musical Department of Hungarian Radio.

He wrote several librettos for Hungarian operas, including Hunyady for Rezső Sugár (1953), Báthory Zsigmond for Horusitzky Zoltán (1960), and Muzsikus Péter for György Ránki (1963).

He translated several operas and musicals into Hungarian; the best known is Cats.

He wrote scripts for the cartoons Lúdas Matyi and Hófehér.

He is known for his animal poems that were released after his death with the title Szamárfül ("Earmark" and "Ear of a Donkey").

He is perhaps best known for the scripts of various Hungarian cartoon series, including Mézga Család (The Gums), the Kérem a következőt! ("Next, please!" or "Dr. Bubo", 1973–74) and some translations for dubbed versions of American cartoons, like the rhyming translation of The Flintstones and of Huckleberry Hound. He was nicknamed "Romhányi, a rímhányó", a rhyme meaning "Romhanyi the Rhyme-Caster".

== Sources ==
- Reményi Gyenes István: Ismerjük őket? Zsidó származású nevezetes magyarok arcképcsarnoka, Budapest, Ex Libris kiadó, 2000., ISBN 9638553030
- Magyar életrajzi lexikon
- TheatreDB page, szinhaziadattar.hu
- Kemény Egon
