= Sisyphus (film) =

1974 Hungarian animated short film

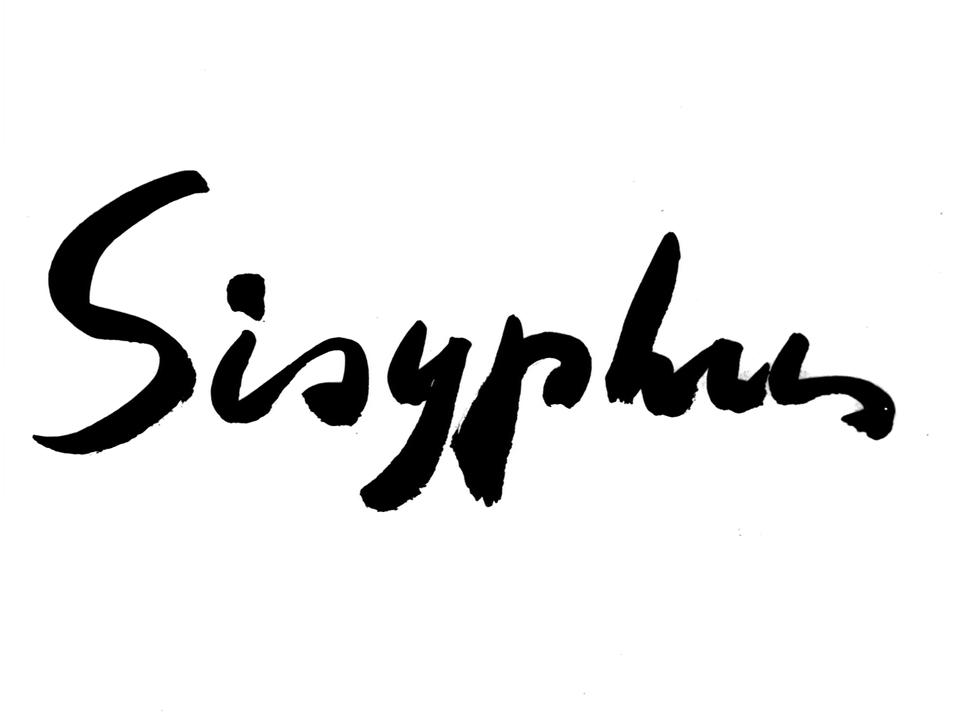
- Opening title card
- Directed by: Marcell Jankovics
- Cinematography: Zoltán Bacsó
- Edited by: János Czipauer; Katalin Gyöpös (assistant)
- Production company: Pannonia Film Studio
- Release date: October 1974 (United States)
- Running time: 2 minutes
- Country: Hungary

Sisyphus is a 1974 Hungarian animated short film directed by Marcell Jankovics. The 2-minute-long black and white short film has no spoken dialogue, and portrays the mythological Greek tale of Sisyphus, rolling an ever growing boulder up a hill. It was purportedly inspired by the immensity of the undertaking of Jankovics' earlier 74-minute-long animated film, Johnny Corncob (1973).

The film was drawn almost entirely by Jankovics, with occasional help by another artist. During an interview in 2005, Jankovics said they managed to produce 1,800 ink drawings in six weeks, and he considered it his best work.

== Reception and legacy ==
Sisyphus was nominated for the Academy Award for Best Animated Short Film at the 48th Academy Awards in 1976, losing to Bob Godfrey's Great (1975).

In 2008, it was used in a commercial for the GMC Yukon Hybrid which was shown at the Super Bowl.

During the 2025 Annecy International Animation Film Festival, in France, a "Tribute to Hungarian Animation" special programme was organized which included the short film, played on 9 and 14 June.

As of 2026, the film has an IMDb rating of 7.0/10 (calculated out of 1,184 user ratings), and a Letterboxd rating of 3.75/5 (calculated out of 4,336 user ratings).

== See also ==
- Johnny Corncob (1973)
