= Erzsi Pártos =

Hungarian actress (1907–2000)

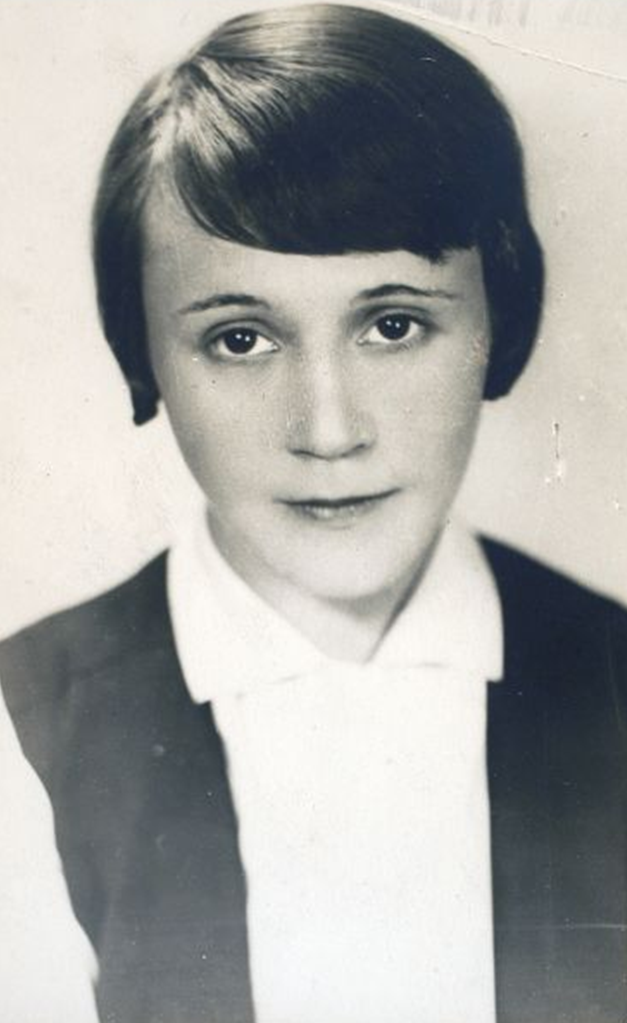
- Pártos, c. 1920s
- Born: Erzsébet Pollák; 2 April 1907; Budapest, Austria-Hungary
- Died: 18 April 2000 (aged 93); Budapest, Hungary
- Occupation: Actress
- Years active: 1932–1993

Erzsi Pártos (born Erzsébet Pollák; 2 April 1907 – 18 April 2000) was a Hungarian actress. She appeared in more than eighty films from 1932 to 1993.

== Selected filmography ==
| Year | Title | Role | Notes |
|---|---|---|---|
| 1933 | The Rakoczi March | | |
| 1934 | Romance of Ida | | |
| 1937 | A Girl Sets Out | | |
| 1937 | There Are Exceptions | | |
| 1937 | Lady Seeks a Room | | |
| 1937 | My Daughter Is Different | | |
| 1938 | The Village Rogue | | |
| 1938 | Magda Expelled | | |
| 1949 | Mattie the Goose-boy | Anyo | |
| 1950 | The Marriage of Katalin Kis | | |
| 1953 | The State Department Store | | |
| 1973 | Johnny Corncob | | |
| 1993 | Whoops | | |
