= The Struggle (1977 film) =

The Struggle (Hungarian: Küzdők) is a 1977 Hungarian animated short film directed by Marcell Jankovics. It tells the story of a sculptor whose statue begins to hack its creator with a chisel. The film is two minutes long. It was awarded the Short Film Palme d'Or at the 1977 Cannes Film Festival.

== Plot ==
A young sculptor with the features of a Greco-Roman statue is carving a statue in stone. As the statue takes form, it comes alive. A struggle begins where the statue fights back and carves the artist with a chisel. As the artist refines the features of his statue and makes it appear young and muscular, the statue carves the artist and makes him take on the features of an old and frail man. When the statue is finished, the artist falls to the ground.

== Production ==
The film was produced by Hungarofilm and Pannonia Film Studio. Unlike Jankovics' feature films it was made quickly.
