= Mattie the Goose-boy (poem) =

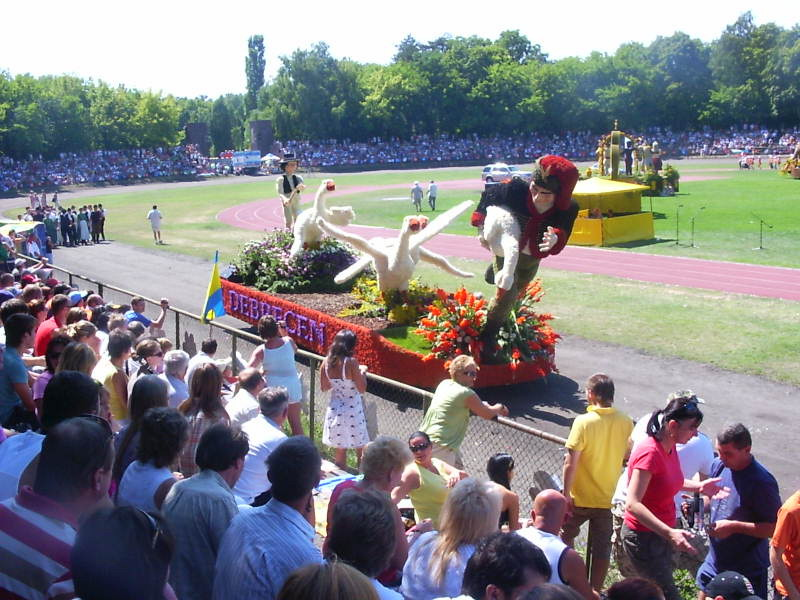
Mattie the Goose-boy

Mattie the Goose-boy, or Lúdas Matyi, is a Hungarian epic poem written by Mihály Fazekas (1766–1828) in 1804 and first released in 1817. It is based on a folk-tale of unknown origins. Most film adaptations place the story to the beginning of the 19th century, however based on hints in the poem, as well as the word "ludas" also being used to depict someone suspected of a crime already in the Tripartitum, the original story can be placed at least to the early 16th century. The story's structure and motifs are similar to the later-discovered Akkadian story Poor Man of Nippur from 1500 BC.

== Plot ==
=== Prologue ===
Matyi, a young peasant boy, is trying to sell his geese at the market. Trouble ensues when the local lord named Döbröghy, offers to underpay for them by about half the price, which Matyi declines. Lord Döbröghy then orders his servants to take the geese by force, and punish Matyi with 50 lashes to his back. Matyi vows to get revenge, proclaiming that he will repay the punishment three times to the lord.

=== The first repayment ===
Three years after Matyi's punishment, Döbröghy begins building a castle for himself. The construction goes on very slowly, because of the lack of carpenters. Matyi dresses as an Italian architect-maestro, and he visits the construction site. He lures the lord and his servants to the nearby forest to gather wood for the structure. After ordering all the servants and guards to harvest the forest, he then lures Döbröghy away, ties him to a tree with a rope, and lashes him for the first time.

=== The second repayment ===
After being lashed, Lord Döbröghy is being cured in his fancy new castle. He orders his soldiers to get him a real doctor, because he claims his wound isn't healing. The servants go to seek a doctor. Matyi dresses as a German battlefield medic, and he is brought to the lord and ordered to cure him. He sends the whole folk of the castle out to the nearby field to collect some special fictional herbs, playing into the ineptitude of the staff. While everybody is out harvesting, Matyi gives Döbröghy the second revenge. After that he frees the geese of the village, which formerly were imprisoned by the lord.

=== The third repayment ===
It's now winter and the date of the annual market. Döbröghy knows that Matyi will surely repay the punishment, so he keeps a garrison of guards with him at all times. Matyi instead makes a deal with a local horse rider boy, who lures the whole army away by loudly claiming to be the real Ludas Matyi. As they give chase, the real one stays behind with Döbröghy and dishes out his last third of the punishment.

== Edification ==
The poem was an ironic advice to the lords of Hungary, not to penalize the peasants needlessly. It also emphasizes the intelligence of the poor.

== Importance ==
Lúdas Matyi was the first folk hero in Hungarian literature who is victorious over his lord. The poem represented the relationship between nobility and the folk as well, and it emphasized the problems of the Hungarian agro-society in the late 18th century.

Much later the communist government created movies of the story and emphasized the superiority of the workers and the poor.

The tale is a bent mirror to the Hungarian society.

== Lúdas Matyi in the media ==
- 1867-1872 - A paper with the title: Ludas Matyi - The entertaining pictured newspaper of the Hungarian folk. The author, Károly Mészáros, was imprisoned for 10 years for showing Franz Joseph as the Crucified Jesus.
- 1922 - The first Lúdas Matyi film, directed by Alfréd Deésy.
- 1950 - Lúdas Matyi film, directed by Kálmán Nádasdy and László Ranódy. Starring: Imre Soós. Music for the film was composed by Ferenc Szabó and arranged as a suite for orchestra.
- 1945-1992 - The weekly paper Ludas Matyi was the only authorized Hungarian satiric paper during the communist era. Lúdas Matyi used irony and satire to portray the dictatorship and Hungarian society with all of its participants. The paper was extremely popular, and sold a record number of about 650,000 papers. It was allowed to publish surprisingly frank caricatures of politicians, military leaders and society, but was suspended between 25 October 1956 and 21 February 1957 during the Hungarian Revolution of 1956 and its aftermath.

In the early times Lúdas Matyi notably included a "Down with Bureaucracy" feature with unusually sharp criticism of the system. Its outlook on foreign affairs was biased towards the Soviet view but was aimed towards humor rather than shrill propaganda. It included an ongoing weekly dialog between two opposing soldiers, the wise and humane "Ivan" and the hapless "Joe".

The magazine also commented on the emerging sexual revolution with a mixture of sexist satire (the Jucika cartoon series being the notable example) and more balanced gender-equality advocacy.

- 1977 - Mattie the Goose-boy, an animated film by Attila Dargay
- 1978-1979 – Over two years (and 24 issues) Ludas Matyi was one of the main characters in the monthly East German comic book magazine Mosaik. His first entrance was in issue 1/1978, last in 12/1979. Setting is the Habsburg monarchy in the beginning 18th century. Ludas Matyi is turned out to be a straying Kuruc characterised by shrewdness and masquerading as someone else to attain a goal.
