= Son of the White Mare =

1981 Hungarian animated surrealist fantasy adventure film by Marcell Jankovics

- Theatrical release poster
- Directed by: Marcell Jankovics
- Produced by: Román Kunz
- Starring: György Cserhalmi; Vera Pap; Mari Szemes; Gyula Szabó; Ferenc Szalma; Szabolcs Tóth; Ottó Ulmann
- Cinematography: Zoltán Bacsó
- Edited by: Magda Hap
- Music by: István Vajda
- Production company: Pannonia Film Studio
- Distributed by: MOKÉP (Hungary); Arbelos Films (United States)
- Release date: 22 October 1981 (Hungary)
- Running time: 82 minutes
- Country: Hungary
- Language: Hungarian

Son of the White Mare (Hungarian: Fehérlófia, lit. "Son of White Horse") is a 1981 Hungarian animated psychedelic fantasy adventure drama romance film directed by Marcell Jankovics. The story's main character is Fehérlófia (Son of the White Mare), who has superhuman powers. It is based on narrative poetry, under the same title, from László Arany and ancient Hunnic, Avaric and Hungarian legends, as a tribute to ancient steppe peoples.

== Plot ==
Fanyüvő (Treeshaker) is the third son of the White Mare, whose horse milk gives him superhuman powers. He listens to old tales about the Forefather whose kingdom was overrun by evil humanoid dragons set loose by the Forefather's three evil daughters-in-law. After the horse's death, Fanyüvő sets out to find and destroy the tyrannical dragons, along with his two equally mighty brothers, Kőmorzsoló (Stonecrusher) and Vasgyúró (Ironbender). In search of the entrance to the dragons' Underworld home, they shelter in a hollow tree, where each day one brother cooks porridge and makes rope while the other two go out to search. An ancient mischief-making gnome, Hétszűnyű Kapanyányi Monyók (Sevenwinged Skullsized Gnome), keeps asking to share their porridge, and when Kőmorzsoló and Vasgyúró refuse, Hétszűnyű attacks them and eats the mush from their belly, but Fanyüvő catches his beard in the tree hollow. When Hétszűnyű's thrashing pulls down the tree, the heroes find the entrance of the Underworld under its roots. They shave his beard — the source of his power — and forge a sword from it for Fanyűvő.

Only Fanyüvő dares to enter the Underworld, and they lower him in a cauldron. There he finds the Gnome; they make a pact, and he shows Fanyüvő to the first princess. After he slays the first dragon, the princess then leads him to the second dragon, which he also kills, and finally the third dragon as well. After the victory, Kőmorzsoló and Vasgyúró pull the cauldron up along with the three princesses. Lowered down once more into the Underworld, Fanyűvő puts in three apples, each containing a princess's castle, but it becomes too heavy for the brothers and the princesses to lift.

The entrance closes and Fanyüvő is trapped in the Underworld. To get his beard back, the Gnome tells him of a griffin who could help. A snake tries to eat the griffin's chicks, but Fanyüvő stops it, and the grateful Griffin Father offers to take Fanyüvő to the Upper World. To sustain him on the journey, he tasks Fanyűvő with getting twelve oxen and twelve barrels of wine. The Forefather, whose power had been restored, grants Fanyűvő the oxen and wine, but the flight to the Upper World is too long, and Fanyűvő has to cut his own leg off to feed the griffin.

After the arrival, the griffin chicks restore Fanyüvő's leg, which gives him more power. He angrily accuses his brothers of deliberately leaving him behind, but forgives them. All three marry each one of the princesses and move into the castles and live happily ever after.

In the final shot, Fanyüvő is walking above a modern cityscape, fading to black as the credits roll.

== Production ==
Son of the White Mare was made from 1979 to 1981 and was Jankovics's second animated feature.

== Comparison with mythology ==
There are slight differences between Arany's Fehérlófia and the film. In Son of the White Mare, Fehérlófia and Fanyűvő (Treeshaker) are the same person. The film contains elements of creation myths, namely Ősanya (Great Mother), Ősapa (Forefather), and the Világfa (World tree).

== Reception and legacy ==
Son of the White Mare was placed #49 on the Olympiad of Animation in 1984. On Metacritic, the film has a weighted average score of 90 out of 100 based on 5 critic reviews, indicating "universal acclaim".

Animation historian Charles Solomon (who first saw it at an Academy screening in 1983) listed it, under the title The White Mare's Son, as one of the best animated films of the 1980s.

The film, under the title The White Mare, premiered at the Los Angeles International Animation Celebration in September 1985.

It soon became a cult classic whose followers include Disney animator Roger Allers (who hired Jankovics for Kingdom of the Sun, before eventually becoming The Emperor's New Groove, after he saw the film screened by Solomon via a bootleg copy) and Aeon Flux creator Peter Chung (who first saw it in 1984).

== Restoration ==
A 4K restoration was done on the film by Los Angeles studio Arbelos Films. The restoration originally screened at the 2019 Fantasia International Film Festival on July 28, and there were plans to release it theatrically, but due to the COVID-19 pandemic these plans were soon cancelled. It was instead released on Vimeo in August 2020, marking the first time that the film was distributed in America in decades. A Blu-ray of the film by Arbelos was released in June 2021, also featuring some of Jankovics' earlier films, including Academy Award-nominated Sisyphus and Johnny Corncob.
