= Felix the Cat: The Movie =

- Theatrical release poster
- Directed by: Tibor Hernádi
- Screenplay by: Pete Brown; Don Oriolo
- Based on: An Original Story by Don Oriolo
- Produced by: József Bujtár; Don Oriolo; Janos Schenk; Christian Schneider
- Starring: David Kolin; Chris Phillips; Maureen O'Connell; Peter Newman; Alice Playten
- Cinematography: László Radocsay
- Music by: Christopher L. Stone
- Production companies: Felix the Cat Creations; Animation Film Cologne; Pannónia Filmstúdió
- Distributed by: New World Pictures
- Release date: January 26, 1989
- Running time: 82 minutes
- Countries: United States; West Germany; Hungary; Poland; Bulgaria; Canada
- Language: English
- Budget: $9 million

Felix the Cat: The Movie is a 1989 animated musical fantasy comedy film directed by Tibor Hernádi (in his directorial debut) and based on the cartoon and comic strip character of the same name.

The film began development in 1985 and was made in Europe between 1986 and 1987. It was not officially released in the United States until 1991 on VHS.

== Plot ==
The film, celebrating the 70th anniversary of Felix the Cat, opens in the Kingdom of Oriana where Princess Oriana, ruler of the kingdom, has been informed by a local fortune-teller Pearl that her evil uncle, the Duke of Zill, is invading the kingdom. To counter the threat of the Duke, Oriana and Pearl descend into the cavern underneath the castle and attempt to use an ancient device called the "Dimensporter" in order to escape to another dimension and find a hero to save the kingdom. However, they are caught by the Duke's robotic army and imprisoned, while the Duke himself seizes control of the kingdom. As the princess is taken away by the Duke's "Cylinder" robots, she sheds a magical tear, which flies into the Dimensporter in her place and is transported to Felix's dimension, where the eponymous feline is taking a nap underneath a palm tree when the tear finds him. The tear wakes and guides him to an abandoned gold mine, where the Dimensporter is located. Felix the Cat, with his magical bag of tricks, is soon transported to the Kingdom of Oriana.

Meanwhile, Felix's nemesis, The Professor, and his nephew Poindexter, who had been spying on him, follow Felix to Oriana in the hopes of catching Felix and stealing his magic bag. Once in Oriana, the tear tells Felix that it cannot guide him any further and vanishes. Felix gets lost and subsequently ends up in a swamp in the Land of Zill. There, he meets Pim, who offers to guide him, but Pim later betrays Felix and hands him over to Wack Lizardi, the owner of a local circus and a lackey of the Duke. At Pim's suggestion, Wack confiscates Felix's bag and puts him to work as a performer, locking Felix in a cell before and after every show.

Eventually, Felix manages to sneak out of his cell and meets with the princess, who is being held in an adjacent cell. She explains to Felix about the Duke's conquest of her kingdom, whom she reveals is actually her uncle. In the past, the Duke was a scientist who disagreed with the pacifistic views the kingdom held. After a laboratory accident left him disfigured, he rebuilt his body into a mechanical shell. For attempting to seize the royal secrets of their ancestors' high technology, he was banished to the Land of Zill. He plotted revenge, meanwhile gaining the allegiance of the strange creatures of Zill, built a robotic army, and stormed Oriana by force. Not content with simply ruling Oriana, he continued his efforts to find the royal secrets contained in the "Book of Ultimate Power", which the princess has refused to reveal the location of. Felix escapes with the princess, using his magic bag to fly away in the middle of a stage performance. Felix, Oriana, and a reformed Pim set off toward the kingdom of Oriana, eventually joined by the Professor and Poindexter after they fail to steal Felix's bag.

The heroes infiltrate the castle, but are quickly subdued and captured by the Duke's army. The Duke forces Oriana to reveal the location of the Book of Ultimate Power to him by threatening to kill Felix and the others, but upon obtaining it, he discovers its contents are of no use to him. Enraged, the Duke unleashes his ultimate creation, Master Cylinder, to destroy the heroes, but Felix throws the book at the Master Cylinder, causing it to short circuit and break down, which in turn shuts down the rest of the Cylinders. With his army gone, the Duke flees, swearing to return. The kingdom saved, Oriana transports Felix, The Professor, and Poindexter home with the Dimensporter.

== Voice cast ==
- David Kolin as Felix the Cat
- Chris Phillips as The Professor / Grumper
- Maureen O'Connell as Princess Oriana
- Peter Newman as The Duke of Zill / Wack Lizardi / Pim
- Alice Playten as Madam Pearl / Poindexter
- Don Oriolo as Creature
- Susan Montanaro, Christian Schneider, and Michael Fremer as Additional voices

== Musical numbers ==
The film features Winston Sharples' theme song from the Felix the Cat TV series, on which the film is based. The score was composed by Christopher L. Stone, with songs by Bernd Schonhoffen, Don Oriolo, and Christian Schneider.

1. "Sly as a Fox"
2. "Together Again" [Instrumental]
3. "All You Need Is Friends"
4. "Who Is the Boss?"
5. "Mizzard Shuffle" [Instrumental]
6. "Face to the Wind (The Princess Song)" [Instrumental]
7. "Something More Than Friends"
8. "End Credits" [Instrumental]

== Production ==
The film began development in the late 1980s, when Don Oriolo (the son of Joe Oriolo, creator of the TV series) began work on a feature-length television special intended as a pilot. After Oriolo took the project to Europe, it ended up with director Tibor Hernádi and his Hungarian crew, at a cost of US$9 million.

The film opens with an introduction by Felix, who is rendered in CGI using then-new motion capture technology; this model also appears throughout the end credits. The rest of the film, however, is rendered in hand-drawn animation. The animation was produced at Pannonia Film Studio in Hungary, with some parts subcontracted to studios in Poland and Bulgaria.

== Release and reception ==
New World Pictures picked up the film in May 1987, some time after completion, and premiered it at the Wadsworth Theatre in Los Angeles in January 1989 as the opening selection of the third Los Angeles Animation Celebration.

Originally slated for a Thanksgiving 1988 release, it was pushed to 1990 before New World shelved the film altogether due to financial issues. In the meantime, it was released in some foreign markets like the UK.

=== Critical reception ===
Felix the Cat: The Movie was widely panned by critics and audiences upon its release. Halliwell's Film Guide called it a "laboured attempt to update the classic cartoon figure". Philip Strick of MFB commented that it was "more likely to bury the ingratiating Felix beyond revival than to stimulate fresh legions of fans". In his 2005 book Television Cartoon Shows, Hal Erickson noted that it "managed to salvage whatever marginal charm the 1960 series has had by dressing it up with first class animation and character design".

== Home media ==
In the United States, it was not officially released until 1991 on VHS. The film was released on VHS on August 23, 1991 by Buena Vista Home Video.

== See also ==
- List of animated feature-length films
