= Tibor Hernádi =

Hungarian animation director (1947–2012)

- Born: 22 August 1947; Budapest, Hungary
- Died: 26 July 2012 (aged 64); Budapest, Hungary
- Occupations: Animator, director, producer, screenwriter, layout artist

Tibor Hernádi (22 August 1947 – 26 July 2012) was a Hungarian animation director, film director, producer, screenwriter and storyboard artist. Hernádi has served as an animation director and layout artist in several animated films throughout his career. He had also directed 86 animated Red Bull commercials between 1992 and 2012. After working as a director on short animated films, Hernádi made his full-length directorial effort in Felix the Cat: The Movie, which was released in the United Kingdom in October 1988. He also served as the layout artist for the film. The film was heavily panned by critics and fans of the original cartoons. In 1990, he directed the Hungarian animated film Sárkány és papucs; an adaptation of the King Arthur legend. In 1991, Hernádi co-wrote and co-directed The Seventh Brother along with Jeno Koltai. He also served as the character designer of the film.

Hernádi died in 2012 in Hungary.

== Filmography ==
- Johnny Corncob (1973) (animator)
- Felix the Cat: The Movie (1988) (director, animation director, layout artist, storyboard artist)
- Sárkány és papucs (1990) (director)
- The Seventh Brother (1991) (co-director, co-writer, character designer, storyboard artist)
