= Goose-boy =

Goose Boy
- Directed by: Kálmán Nádasdy & László Ranódy
- Starring: Imre Soós; Erzsi Pártos
- Release date: 27 February 1950
- Running time: 1h 43min
- Country: Hungary
- Language: Hungarian

Goose Boy (Hungarian: Lúdas Matyi) is a 1950 Hungarian comedy film directed by Kálmán Nádasdy & László Ranódy, based on the epic poem by Mihály Fazekas.

== Cast ==
- Imre Soós - Ludas Matyi
- Erzsi Pártos - Matyi's mother
- Teri Horváth - Piros
- György Solthy - Döbrögy
- Éva Ruttkai - Gyöngyi, Döbrögy's daughter
- Manyi Kiss - Paméla, french governess
- Artúr Somlay - Mohos professzor
- István Bozóky - Nyegriczky Bálint
- János Görbe - Gergely
- Miklós Szakáts - Bogáncs
- Samu Balázs - actor
