= Erzsébet Kútvölgyi =

Hungarian actress (born 1950)

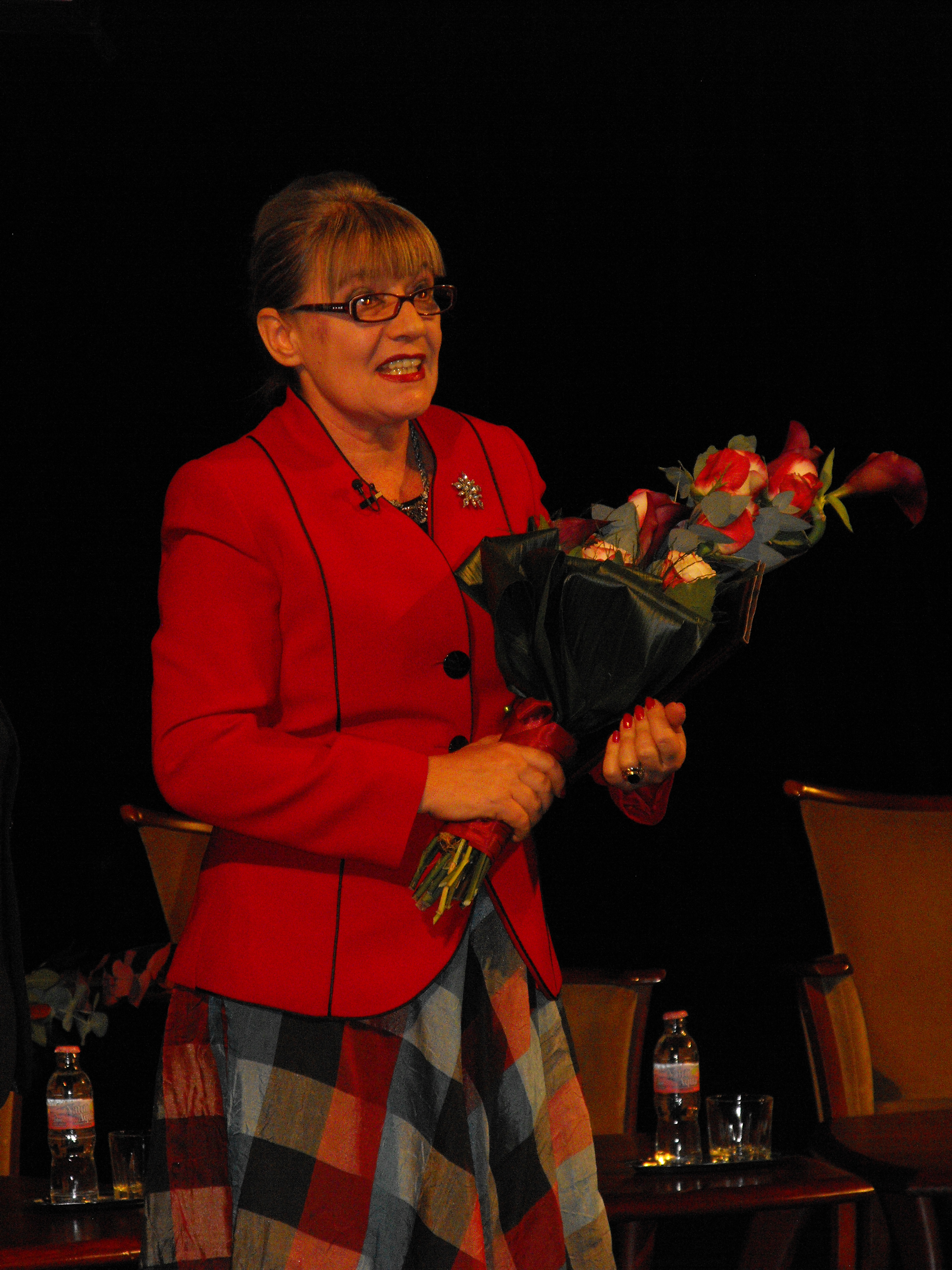
- Kútvölgyi in 2012
- Born: 14 November 1950 (age 76); Budapest, Hungary
- Occupation: Actress
- Children: Örkény Iván

Erzsébet Kútvölgyi (born 14 November 1950) is a Jászai Mari Award and Kossuth Prize-winning Hungarian actress.

== Filmography ==
- Misi mókus kalandjai as Sammy the Squirrel
- Macbeth
- Johnny Corncob as the Princess
- The Little Fox as fox girl
- A Strange Role as Zsófi nővér

== Theatre credits ==
- 1987: Fantine in the original Hungarian cast of Les Misérables
