= Misi mókus kalandjai =

Hungarian animated series

- Created by: Mészöly Miklós
- Directed by: Ottó Foky
- Voices of: Kútvölgyi Erzsébet
- Composer: Pethő Zsolt
- Country of origin: Hungary
- Original language: Hungarian
- No. of seasons: 1
- No. of episodes: 13

Production
- Producer: Laszlo Nádasi
- Editor: Hap Magda
- Running time: 30 minutes

Original release
- Network: Magyar Televízió
- Release: 20 February – 18 May 1982

Misi Mókus kalandjai (lit. The Adventures of Misi, the squirrel) is a Hungarian stop motion animated series, an adaptation of books by Józsi Jenő Tersánszky. The TV series was produced by The Pannonia Film Studio and broadcast on Magyar Televízió in 1982. In 1984, a film, The Adventures of Sam the Squirrel, was produced based on the television series.

== Premise ==
The series follow the adventures of Sam the squirrel (Simi, in the original version) who hates studying.

== Episode list ==
No.	Title	Original release date
1	(Hungarian: Ribillió Mókuséknál)	February 20, 1982
2	(Hungarian: Misi Mókus útra kel)	February 27, 1982
3	(Hungarian: Misi és a ravasz madarász)	March 6, 1982
4	(Hungarian: Szökés a fogságból)	March 13, 1982
5	(Hungarian: Potyautas a tengeren)	March 20, 1982
6	(Hungarian: Találkozás Bumbával és a nagy Krokóval)	March 27, 1982
7	(Hungarian: Kacifánt és a száz banán)	April 3, 1982
8	(Hungarian: A nagy bölcs barlangjában)	April 10, 1982
9	(Hungarian: A nagy barlangon keresztül)	April 17, 1982
10	(Hungarian: Az örökké termő fa szigetén)	April 24, 1982
11	(Hungarian: Hazafelé)	May 1, 1982
12	(Hungarian: Bumba világszám lesz)	May 8, 1982
13	(Hungarian: Legjobb a hazai mogyoró)	May 15, 1982
