= Józsi Jenő Tersánszky =

Hungarian writer (1888–1969)

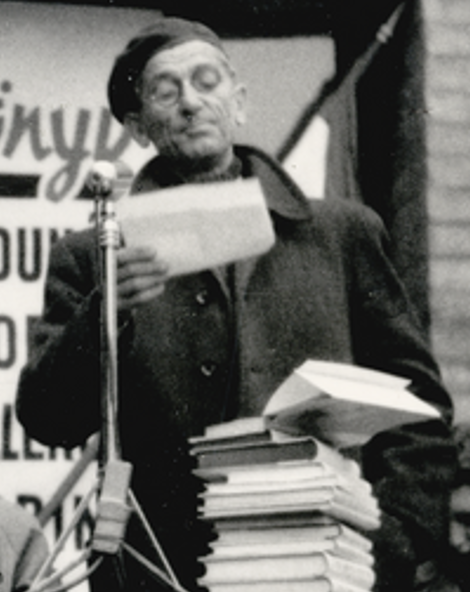
- Bust of Tersánszky (created by Vilmos Fémes Beck)
- Born: Tersánszky József Jenő; 12 September 1888; Nagybánya, Hungary
- Died: 12 June 1969 (aged 80); Budapest, Hungary
- Occupation: Writer
- Writing career
- Genre: Children's literature
- Notable work: Misi mókus kalandjai
- Notable awards: Kossuth Prize for Writing; 1949 Baumgarten Prize for writing 1929

Józsi Jenő Tersánszky (12 September 1888 — 12 June 1969) is a Kossuth Prize-winning Hungarian writer. Tersánszky is considered one of the outstanding icons of 20th century Hungarian literature.
