= A kockásfülű nyúl =

Hungarian animated children series

- Genre: Comedy
- Written by: Veronika Marék
- Directed by: Zsolt Richly; Bakara Barbara
- Theme music composer: Árpád Balázs; Balázs Ádám
- Country of origin: Hungary
- Original language: Hungarian
- No. of seasons: 3
- No. of episodes: 26

Production
- Producer: Imre István
- Production company: Pannónia Filmstúdió

Original release
- Network: Magyar Televízió
- Release: August 26, 1977 – September 22, 1979

A kockásfülű nyúl (English: "The rabbit with checkered ears") is a 26-episode Hungarian animated children's series produced from 26 August 1977 on in the studios of PannóniaFilm. Created by the acclaimed children's literature writer and graphic artist Veronika Marék and animator Zsolt Richly, its protagonist, the rabbit with checkered ears quickly became one of the most prolific mascots of Hungarian animation.

== Format ==
At its debut the series ran every Saturday in the children's programming section of the then only Hungarian television channel, Magyar Televízió. The few-minute long episodes consisted of simple stories in which the main character, a stuffed rabbit with checkered ears, helps one or more of the series' other main characters, four children called Kriszta (dark-haired 9-year old girl), Menyus (red-haired 8-year old boy), Kistöfi (blond 4-year old boy) and Mozdony (big bully) in various situations.

== Episodes ==
1. Kriszta születésnapja (Krisztina's birthday)
2. Menyus és a hóember (Menyus and the snowman)
3. Kistöfi az állatkertben (Kistöfi at the zoo)
4. Kriszta a majálison (Krisztina at the picnic)
5. Menyus és a sportsverseny (Menyus and the sports competition)
6. Kriszta, az indián (Krisztina, the Indian)
7. Kriszta és a jelmezbál (Krisztina and the costume)
8. Kistöfi a tóparton (Kistöfi at the lake)
9. Menyus és a rajzverseny (Menyus and the drawing competition)
10. Kistöfi a hegyekben (Kistöfi in the mountains)
11. Kriszta a játszótéren (Krisztina on the playground)
12. Kistöfi eltéved (Kistöfi gets lost)
13. Menyus meg a foxi (Menyus and the fox terrier)
14. Tulipánok a téren (Tulips in the field)
15. A fényképezőgép (The camera)
16. Az erőművész (The artist's power)
17. A kölcsönkért babakocsi (The borrowed stroller)
18. Kutyasétáltatás (Dog walking)
19. A cirkusz (The circus)
20. A repülő térkép (The airport map)
21. Süt a nap (The sun is shining)
22. A csodakocsi (The wonder car)
23. Az elveszett papagáj (The lost parrot)
24. Kié a ház? (Whose house is this?)
25. Zenedélután (Afternoon music)
26. A nagy bújócska (A great hide and seek)

== Legacy ==
The series was first syndicated in the countries around Hungary, and then in nearly ninety other countries around the world. Having no spoken dialogue, the episodes needed no dubbing (except for text), and the universal storylines were easily comprehensible, making the series adaptable in various countries.

The checkered-eared rabbit's fame rocketed in and around Hungary with the rise in popularity of retro not only in fashion and design but with the rediscovery of the qualities of Central Eastern Europe's pre-1980s culture. It also became somewhat sought after in the U.S., where it is often described as the "bunny in a suitcase" and recalled from its frequent broadcasts on the Pinwheel cable program on Nickelodeon. At the time of the original series, merchandising was an unknown term in Hungary, but with the return of the series (as well as other popular children's programmes of the seventies and eighties from the region) the rabbit can now be found on school accessories, pillows as well as in the form of plush toys.

In Hungary, 2002 and 2003 saw the release of two DVD sets of the series, each holding 13 of the 26 episodes.
