= Song of the Miraculous Hind =

- Directed by: Marcell Jankovics
- Written by: Marcell Jankovics
- Cinematography: Zoltán Bacsó; András Klausz; György Varga
- Edited by: Magda Hap
- Music by: Levente Szörényi
- Production company: Pannonia Film Studio
- Distributed by: Budapest Film
- Release date: 21 February 2002
- Running time: 89 minutes
- Country: Hungary
- Language: Hungarian

Song of the Miraculous Hind (Hungarian: Ének a csodaszarvasról) is a 2002 Hungarian animated mythological and historical film directed by Marcell Jankovics. It tells the story of the Hungarian people, from the creation of the first humans to the expedition of brothers Hunor and Magyar, to the time of Prince Géza, when the nation was Christianized. The narrative is told in four sections, each focusing on a different era. The film was produced by Pannonia Film Studio. It was released in Hungarian cinemas on 21 February 2002.

== Reception ==
David Stratton wrote in Variety: "An animated history lesson for Hungarian schoolkids, Song of the Miraculous Hind has little or nothing to offer non-Magyars. Long-in-production feature from veteran Marcell Jankovics offers good, if very retro, design, and bright use of color, but little in the way of contemporary animation techniques. ... Using a mainly choral soundtrack, pic takes itself very seriously, with no attempts at humor as the lengthy saga unfolds".
