= Di Cavalcanti (film) =

1977 film by Glauber Rocha

- Directed by: Glauber Rocha
- Written by: Glauber Rocha
- Produced by: Glauber Rocha
- Release date: 1977
- Running time: 17 minutes
- Country: Brazil
- Language: Portuguese

Di Cavalcanti, or simply Di, is a 1977 Brazilian documentary short film by Glauber Rocha, about the funeral of the internationally renowned painter Di Cavalcanti.

In the 2010s it was voted number 88 on the Abraccine Top 100 Brazilian films list and also number 9 in its documentary list.

== Plot ==
After hearing news on the radio about the death of Di Cavalcanti, filmmaker Glauber Rocha gathered a small film crew to record the painter's funeral and burial, held respectively in the lobby of the Museum of Modern Art and São João Batista cemetery, both in the Rio de Janeiro.

== Reception ==
The film was first shown on March 11, 1977 during a session at the Modern Art Museum of Rio de Janeiro, along with the feature film "Cabeças Cortadas", also by Glauber, but shortly after its exhibition, Elizabeth Di Cavalcanti (the painter's adopted daughter) asked the Brazilian Court to ban the exhibition of the short film.

The film was also screened at the 1977 Cannes Film Festival, where it received the Special Jury Prize for Best Short Film. But in 1979, Elizabeth succeeded in court that the film was banned from being shown in Brazilian territory.

In 2004, Glauber's family members made the work available on the Internet under the subtitle "Ninguém assistiu ao formidável enterro de sua quimera, somente a ingratidão essa pantera,foi sua companhia inseparável" ("No one watched the formidable Burial of your last chimera. Only the Ingratitude - this panther").

== Accolades ==
List of awards and nominations
Award	Date of ceremony	Category	Recipient(s) and nominee(s)	Result	Ref.
Cannes Film Festival	1977	Short Film Palme d'Or	Di Cavalcanti	Nominated	
Cannes Film Festival	1977	Short Film Special Jury Prize	Di Cavalcanti	Won	
