= The Mézga Family =

- Genre: Sitcom; Science fiction comedy Adventure
- Created by: Nepp József; Béla Ternovszky
- Theme music composer: Deák Tamás
- Country of origin: Hungary
- Original language: Hungarian
- No. of series: 3
- No. of episodes: 39

Production
- Production company: Pannonia Film Studio

Original release
- Network: Magyar Televízió

The Mézga Family (Hungarian: Mézga család) is an animated TV series about fictional Hungarian family made by Pannonia Film Studio in Hungary between 1969 and 1978.

Scripts for the series were written by József Romhányi and József Nepp. Nepp also served as the film director. The series proved to be very popular, reaching cult status and televised, among others, in Czechoslovakia, Bulgaria, Romania, Italy, The Netherlands, Cuba and both German states and, in the 1990s, in Brazil. The series still regularly appears on television. Each series consists of 13 episodes.

== The family ==
The family consists of Géza, the father, a comical and inept figure, his wife Paula who actually dominates family affairs, 14-year-old teenage daughter Kriszta and 12-year-old son Aladár, a child prodigy. The cat Maffia and a dog, Blöki accompany the family. Dr. Máris, their cynical neighbour, is regularly and involuntarily involved in disasters surrounding the family.

The name "Mézga" means glue, mucilage or tree gum in Hungarian and was renamed as rodina Smolíkova in Czech, which is a surname (derived from "smůla", i.e. "tree gum" or "bad luck") used also in fairy tales, La famiglia Mezil in Italian, Familie Metzger in German, which means butcher, Семејството Смола in Macedonian, Семейство Мейзга in Bulgarian, Família Mézga/Mesga in Portuguese, and Miazgovci in Slovak. In Dutch, however, they were quite generically named De familie Sanders; which has no further meaning.

== The series ==
=== Message from the Future – The Strange Adventures of the Mézga Family ===
The first series was shot in 1968–1969 under the name Üzenet a jövőből – A Mézga család különös kalandjai (Message from the Future – The Strange Adventures of the Mézga Family). The family makes contact with MZ/X, their descendant from the 30th century, with whom child prodigy Aladár made contact. MZ/X sends them, through time, various hypermodern gadgets which invariably result in a disaster. (An example is when MZ/X sends them something that makes the fruits in the Mézga's fruit garden grow to exceptional size. The family is happy with the enormous fruits until they realize that they forgot to kill the insects and other parasites, and they are chased away by gigantic locusts and worms. In another episode a house cleaning robot destroys the furniture because he doesn't understand commands in 20th century Hungarian language.) Episodes usually end with Paula's catch phrase "Why didn't I marry Pisti Hufnágel?", implying that she often regrets she chose Géza over another suitor. In the third series she finally accepts that Hufnágel is not what she imagined him to be.

The series were named Odkaz budoucnosti aneb Podivuhodná dobrodružství rodiny Smolíkovy in Czech, Messaggi dal futuro in Italian, Heißer Draht ins Jenseits – Phantastische Abenteuer der Familie Mézga in German, Невероятните приключения на Семейство Мейзга: Послания от Бъдещето in Bulgarian, and Miazgovci I in Slovak.

=== The Adventures of Aladár Mézga ===
The next series was shot in 1972 under the title Mézga Aladár különös kalandjai (The Adventures of Aladár Mézga). Every night Aladár visits a different inhabited planet using an inflatable interstellar spaceship named Gulliverkli. The name of his ship is a pun on (and a portmanteau of) Gulliver and verkli. This space vehicle, both absurd and futuristic, was presumably built by Aladár, based on parts, supplies, and support provided by MZ/X, however the point is not tackled during the series, leaving the watcher to guess. In this series, Blöki can talk, as Aladár has taught him to speak, so he would make a suitable assistant for space travel. The series satirised various human and social vices; for this reason, two episodes were not allowed to be shown in communist Czechoslovakia.

The series were named Podivuhodná dobrodružství Vladimíra Smolíka in Czech, L'astronave in Italian, Adolars phantastische Abenteuer in East Germany, Archibald, der Weltraumtrotter in West Germany, Семейство Мейзга: Невероятните приключения на Аладар in Bulgarian, and Miazgovci II in Slovak.

=== The Mézga Family on Holiday ===
The third series was shot in 1978 under the name Vakáción a Mézga család (The Mézga Family on Holiday). Pisti Hufnágel, a character mentioned a few times in the first series, the first love of Paula and her ideal, invites the family to spend holidays in Australia. A spare ticket is given to the neighbour, Dr. Ottokár Máris. It turns out that Hufnágel is a swindler and the Mézgas are left abandoned and penniless. Their effort to get home flings them into the most strange places, including the South Pole, and into bizarre situations. Pisti Hufnágel secretly follows them and always turns their hopes into catastrophe. Only when they finally arrive home and find out their flat has been completely ransacked by Hufnágel does Paula lose her faith in her ideal.

Unlike the first two series, which consisted of one-story episodes, this series is a single story arc.

The series were named Podivuhodné prázdniny rodiny Smolíkovy in Czech, Le vacanze della famiglia Mezil in Italian, Die Abenteuer der Familie Metzger in German, Семейство Мейзга във ваканция in Bulgarian, Miazgovci na cestách in Slovak, De familie Sanders is anders in Dutch, and La Familia Mezga in Spanish.

=== The Mézga Family and the Computer ===
During 2005, the Ex-Ist studio prepared a new series under the title A Mézga család és a (sz)ámítógép (The Mézga Family and the Computer) where the family gets acquainted with computers and the Internet. However, the show was later canceled due to a lack of funding, as the economic situation in Hungary grew worse. Only two fully-animated episodes were made from the original 13-episode order.
