= Attila Pacsay =

Hungarian composer (born 1970)

Attila Pacsay (born October 30, 1970) is a Hungarian composer who is particularly known for his music written for films, television, and the theatre. His compositions encompass a wide variety of music from chamber music and symphonic works to jazz pieces and contemporary music.

== Career ==
He began his musical studies in piano, trumpet, and trombone at age 7. A few years later, he started preparing for a career as composer. His compositions were performed by his own band. At age 14, he was accepted in the composition class of László Draskóczy and Attila Reményi at the János Richter Conservatory in the city of Győr. He received his college degree in composition at the Budapest Ferenc Liszt Academy of Music, where he studied in the class of Emil Petrovics.

After graduation, Mr. Pacsay began working as freelancer. Initially, he composed music for television and radio programs, and, in 1997, he met his childhood musician friend the director Géza M. Tóth, who was searching for a composer for his animated films. Their collaboration resulted in hundreds of short animated television ID-s and several animated short films. During these years, besides film scores, Mr. Pacsay composed music for theater and prepared symphonic music arrangements.

Pacsay has collaborated on films with such notable directors as Ferenc Rofusz, Ferenc Cako, and Géza M. Tóth. For his work on the film Ergo he won the award for Best Sound Design at the Animanima International Animation Festival in 2008, the prize for Best Film Score at the Kecskemet Animation Film Festival (KAFF) in 2009, the award for Best Film Music at the Asolo Art Film Festival in 2010 and Best Sound Design Award at the ANIFEST ROZAFA 2010, Albania. For the music and sound design of Geza M. Toth's short feature film "Mama" he won "The Leo" Best Music Award at the 23rd Braunschweig Film Festival in 2009, and he was awarded a KAFF prize for Best Music in 2011 for his work on Sophie Tari's Szofita Land. He also notably wrote the music for the animated short film Maestro which was nominated for Best Animated Short Film during the 79th Academy Awards in 2007.

Besides his work as film composer, Mr. Pacsay is constantly present at other areas of the music scene. For example, his classical orchestrations are on the repertoire of, among others, the Mendelssohn Chamber Orchestra of the city of Veszprém. In the lighter genres, Mr. Pacsay is known as the permanent orchestrator for Tibor Tátrai.

Since 2001 he has served on the faculty of the Media Institute at Moholy-Nagy University of Art and Design in Budapest.

== Film and television scores ==
- 2022: Halfway Home (directed by Isti Madarász)
- 2021: Post Mortem (directed by Péter Bergendy)
- 2020: Final Report (directed by István Szabó)
- 2019: Tall Tales (directed by Attila Szász)
- 2018: Trezor (directed by Péter Bergendy)
- 2017: Budapest Noir (directed by Éva Gárdos)
- 2016: The Carer (directed by János Edelényi)
- 2015: Fever at Dawn (directed by Péter Gárdos)
- 2014: The Undesirable (directed by (Michael Curtiz)
- 2014: Six Dance Lessons in Six Weeks (directed by Arthur Allan Seidelman)
- 2013: Heaven's Vanguard (directed by Emil Goodman)
- 2013: "Kispárizs" (directed by Orsi Nagypál)
- 2012: The Lady with Long Hair (directed by Barbara Bakos)
- 2011: "Patrick and Theo" (directed by Márton Nagy, Márton Kovács, Ervin B.Nagy)
- 2011: "Henry Waltz" (directed by Emil Goodman)
- 2011: "It Happened in TLV" (directed by Balazs Juszt)
- 2010: Szofita Land (directed by Szofita)
- 2009: "Orsolya" (directed by Bella Szederkényi)
- 2009: "Freeze" (directed by Balázs Tóth)
- 2009: Mama (directed by Géza M. Tóth)
- 2009: Detti and Drot (directed by István Heim)
- 2009: Touch (directed by Ferenc Cakó)
- 2008: Ergo (directed by Géza M. Tóth)
- 2007: Face (directed by Ferenc Cakó)
- 2006: Ready, Steady, Money! (directed by Miklós Varga and Zoltán Szalay)
- 2006: Deja Vu (directed by Béla Klingl)
- 2005: Maestro (directed by Géza M.Tóth)
- 2005: Felhővadászok (directed by Katalin Riedl)
- 2004: Dog's Life (directed by Ferenc Rofusz)
- 2003: Crash (directed by Zsolt Richly)
- 2001: Piroska's World, Part 5-6 (directed by István Heim)
- 2000: Urasima Taro (directed by Éva Mandula)
- 1999: Piroska's World, Part 1-4 (directed by István Heim)
- 1998: From To (directed by László Hegedűs II)

== Awards and nominations ==
- Hungarian Film Week - Best Original Music for Post Mortem, nominated, 2021
- Parma International Music Film Festival - Violetta d'Oro Best Original Score for Tall Tales, winner, 2020
- Hungarian Film Week - Best Original Music for Tall Tales, winner, 2020
- Parma International Music Film Festival - Violetta d'Oro Best Original Score for Trezor, nominated, 2019
- Hungarian Film Week - Best Original Music for Trezor, Television Film Category, winner, 2019
- Hungarian Film Week - Best Original Music for Budapest Noir, nominated, 2018
- International Music+Sound Awards - Best Original Composition for Budapest Noir, nominated, 2018
- Hollywood Music in Media Awards - Best Original Music for Budapest Noir, Independent Foreign Language Film Category, winner, 2017
- Hollywood Music in Media Awards - Best Original Music for The Carer, Independent Film Category, nominated, 2016
- International Sound & Film Music Festival - Crystal Pine Best Original Score for The Carer, winner, 2016
- International Sound & Film Music Festival - Crystal Pine Best Original Score for Fever at Dawn, nominated, 2016
- Parma International Music Film Festival - Violetta d'Oro Best Original Score for Fever at Dawn, winner, 2016
- International Music+Sound Awards - Best Original Composition for The Carer, nominated, 2016
- International Music+Sound Awards - Best Original Composition for Fever at Dawn, nominated, 2016
- International Jerry Goldsmith Awards - Best Original Music for Patrick & Theo, Animated Short Film Category, nominated, 2012
- Kecskemet Animation Festival - Best Music Award for Szofita Land, winner, 2011
- International Jerry Goldsmith Awards - Best Original Music for Szofita Land, nominated, 2011
- Asolo Art Film Festival - Best Film Music for Ergo, winner, 2010
- Anifest Rozafa - Best Sound Design for Ergo, winner, 2010
- Kecskemet Animation Festival - Best Music Award for Ergo, winner, 2009
- Braunschweig International Film Festival - 'The Leo' Best Music Award for Mama, winner, 2009
