= Pirate TV (TV series) =

- Genre: Sketch comedy
- Country of origin: United States
- Original language: English

Production
- Camera setup: Single-camera
- Running time: 44 mins.
- Production company: MTV Networks

Original release
- Network: MTV
- Release: August 8, 1990

Pirate TV is an American sketch comedy series that aired on MTV. The series premiered January 26, 1990.

== Overview ==
Set on a boat that beamed illegal television signals, Pirate TV consisted of skits and parodies of commercials and television programs, including Rastapiece Theater, a takeoff of Masterpiece Theatre with a dreadlocked, patois-speaking host, and "Reejok" (jockstraps with inflatable pouches, à la Reebok's "Pump" sneaker, popular at the time). It was co-created by Dave Kolin and Steve Kerper.

Originally airing as 13 one-hour episodes, they were later edited down to a half hour. Many of the concepts of the show, and indeed Rastapiece Theater itself, later transferred to Kerper and Kolin's HBO series Hardcore TV (1992-1993)

The crew of the boat were played by, Boyd Hale (himself), James Rosenthal (himself), Gena Rositano (herself), Spruce Henry (himself) and Gregory Wolfe & James Wolfe as "the Wolfe Brothers."

Some episodes had a special guests such as Sgt. Slaughter, Maury Povich and Clarence Clemons. Most notably was Tim Blake Nelson as "Scab O'Hooley". He would race his pet rats to answer the great questions that plagued the world, so you could "...Quit yer blatherin' and get on with yer miserable lives. This is Scab O'Hooley sayin, I'm not laughin atcha...I'm not laughin!"
