= The Seventh Brother =

- Hungarian DVD cover
- Directed by: Jenő Koltai; Tibor Hernádi
- Written by: Attila Dargay; József Nepp
- Edited by: Madga Hap
- Music by: Wolfgang von Henko
- Production companies: PannóniaFilm; Magyar Televízió; RealFilm; Feature Films for Families
- Distributed by: Hungary: Interpannonia Film; Budapest Film; Germany: Beaufilm; United States: Feature Films for Families (VHS/DVD)
- Release dates: 7 September 1995 (Germany); 4 April 1996 (Hungary); 1997 (United States)
- Running time: Hungary: 80 minutes; Germany: 84 minutes; United States: 74 minutes
- Countries: Hungary; Germany; United States
- Languages: Hungarian; German; English

The Seventh Brother (Hungarian: A hetedik testvér; German: Bobo und die Hasenbande) is a 1995 animated comedy-drama film for children directed by Jenő Koltai and Tibor Hernádi and produced at Hungary's Pannonia Film Studio. It was co-produced with Magyar Televízió, Germany's RealFilm, and the United States's Feature Films for Families.

== Plot ==
In spring, a puppy named Tiny, his owner, a little girl named Angie, and her grandpa have just had an enjoyable trip to a big city. On the way home, their car breaks down in the middle of a storm and the grandpa goes out to fix it. Angie goes out to help, telling Tiny to stay in the car, but leaving the door open. Spotting a frog outside, Tiny goes after it, but falls down a hill. Heartbroken, he decides to wait out the storm by sleeping in a little hollowed-out area in a bush (sleeping through Angie calling for him, as she noticed his absence soon and told her grandpa to go back to find him).

The next morning, a group of rabbits discover Tiny. They think that Tiny is a monster, but the leader of the group and ruffian of the family, J.C., feels that he should be left to survive on his own; luckily, one of his sisters, Joanna, decides that they should help him. She quickly convinces her siblings to join up after putting the matter to a vote with the other rabbits --- Rebecca (the eldest sister), Mimi (the sensitive one), Cody (the glutton), Marty (the cautious one) and Tiny is welcomed into the family as a "bunny-puppy". Tiny accepts, but on one condition, they must come back later to see if Angie came back. The bunnies agree and bring him back to their home following a musical number in which they introduce themselves. However, they teach him to act like a rabbit, such as hopping and keeping his ears up straight. J.C. is frustrated with Tiny because he does not act like a rabbit, but when J.C. is caught by a hawk, Tiny scares the hawk away by barking at it, causing it to release J.C. and fly away in a panic. Because of this, the family afterwards decides to accept Tiny as their brother, which makes the puppy very happy, although their parents are afraid at first.

The morning after, Miss Magpie, the nosy leader of the forest, is very scared of the news and tells her friend, Birdie, and the whole forest about it. Most of the forest is scared of Tiny at first, but when they see that he is not vicious, the animals are relieved. The sole exception for this rule is Miss Magpie, who is still heavily convinced that he is a monster. When Tiny smells the scent of his owners and hears Angie calling for him, he runs up the hill to the road where he first met the bunnies. But when he arrives, he is too late, and thinks that his owners do not want him anymore; luckily, his new family is able to cheer him up. Miss Magpie hires a predatory red fox named Mr. Fox to hunt the rabbits, but Tiny teaches them to growl at him, which scares Mr. Fox and sends him running. Human poachers arrive in the forest to try to kill the forest animals, but Tiny teaches the rabbits to howl while hiding in their home, which send the poachers running.

Later that night, a flood reaches the rabbits' home. J.C. and his father stay in their hole trying to dig their way out while the other rabbits climb up a branch, but Cody is caught in the raging waters. Tiny jumps in and saves Cody, and the rabbits hop onto dry land, but J.C. and his father are still in their hole trying to dig. Tiny saves them and is accepted by the parents.

Winter is not far from arrival, and Miss Magpie mocks Tiny for being a dog, and so not knowing how to prepare for winter. However, a weasel attacks Miss Magpie, citing that the rabbits have become too dangerous. The weasel bites Tiny's leg, but he eventually throws the weasel into a pond. Fearing for Tiny's safety, Miss Magpie warns the rabbits. When the rabbits discover that Tiny is alive, they celebrate. But he is sick due to the effects of the bite (as well as being unable to survive on vegetation like all the other forest animals), and he is taken to see Dr. Owl, who tells the parents that he must be returned to his owners. The rabbits carry Tiny back home, but along the way, they come across a big crease between two hills. J.C. uses a large stick to successfully carry the family over the crease, and they finally reach his owners' home. As Tiny is dragged into his doghouse, the rabbits howl and then disappear, causing Angie to wonder if it is her puppy howling. When Angie sees Tiny, she and her grandpa are very happy to see him again and welcome him home.

== Cast ==
=== Hungarian version ===
- Csongor Szalay as Vacak
- Balázs Simonyi as Tasli
- Álmos Előd as Okoska
- Balázs Szvetlov as Malé
- Kata Nemes-Takách as Karotta
- Dani Halasi as Pufi
- Zsófia Manya as Musz-Musz
- Iván Verebély as Nyuszipapa
- Györgyi Andai as Nyuszimama
- Gyula Szabó as Bagoly
- Károly Kassai as Szarka
- György Simon as Nagypapa
- Julcsi Szönyi as Ágnes
- Vilmos Izsóf as Hugó
- Endre Botár as Elek
- Magdolna Menszátor as Anya
- András Stohl aa Sün
- Tibor Kristóf as Héja
- Péter Barbinek as Róka

=== German version ===
- Constantin von Jascheroff as Bobo (Vacak)
- Jan Steilen as Theo (Tasli)
- Shalisar Haftchenari as Julchen (Okoska)
- Matthias Ruschke as Maxie (Málé)
- Lena Krüper as Karotta
- Stanley Dannbrück as Puffer (Pufi)
- Jana Raschke as Coco (Musz-Musz)
- Theo Branding as Hubert (Nyuszipapa)
- Beate Hasenau as Elster (Nyuszimama)
- Renier Baaken as Opi (Nagypapa)
- Katja Liebing as Angie (Ágnes)
- Joachim Kemmer as Habicht (Héja)
- Claus Wilcke as Dr. Eule (Bagoly)
- Gerd Duwner as Max (Hugó)
- Regine Albrecht, Gisela Ferber, Fabian Kärner, Michaela Kametz, Gerd Kilbinger, Jürg Löw, Lou Richter, Christian Rode, Friedrich Schoenfelder, Santiago Ziesmer, and Wolfgang Ziffer as additional voices

=== English version ===
- Aaron Bybee as Tiny (Vacak/Bobo)
- Joey Lopez as J.C. (Tasli/Theo)
- Christina Schaub as Rebecca (Okoska/Julchen)
- Logan Hall as Marty (Malé/Maxie)
- Laura Schulties as Joanna (Karotta) (credited as Laura Schulthies)
- Andrew Soren as Cody (Pufi/Puffer)
- Sarah Baker as Mimi (Musz-Musz/Coco)
- Mary Sperry as Mrs. Rabbit (Nyuszimama/Elster)
- Scott Wilkinson as Mr. Rabbit (Nyuszipapa/Hubert)/Poacher 3/Weasel
- Joe Requa as Dr. Albert E. Owl (Dr. Eule/Bagoly)
- Linda Bierman as Mrs. Magpie (Szarka)
- Dick Canaday as Grandpa (Nagypapa/Opi)
- Danielle Halliday as Angie (Ágnes)
- Don A. Judd as Silly Crow (credited as Don Judd)
- Mary Parker Williams as Mrs. Bird
- Carson Boss as Mr. Bird
- Jim Wright as Groundhog
- Duane Stevens as Father Hedgehog (Sün)
- Karily Baker as Whiny Hedgehog/Sniffing Mouse
- Nate Gee as Spikey 2/Squirrel 3/Tiny 2 (Vacak 2/Bobo 2)
- Justin Martin as Spikey 3/Squirrel 4
- Richard Bugg as Fox (Róka)
- Mark Probert as Hawk (Héja)
- Rick Macy as Stork/Poacher 1 (Hugó)
- Aaron Watson as Alf/Poacher 2 (Elek)
- Aisha Mortimer as Squirrel 1
- Lance Bradshaw as Squirrel 2
- Wade Wisan as Squirrel 5
- Sydney Lowry as Mouse
- Mel Martin as Melk the Elk
- Annie Baker as Forest Animal
- Jacque Pace, Kaye Tolbert, Brooks Holm, Christy Peterson, Cindy Overstreet and Kerri Odom as Ladies Bird Group

== Soundtrack ==
- The Name Song
  - Music by Kurt Bestor, Sam Cardon, Merrill B. Jenson
- The Danger's All Around Us
  - Music by Kurt Bestor, Sam Cardon, Merrill B. Jenson
- There Is A Home
  - Music by Kurt Bestor, Sam Cardon, Merrill B. Jenson
- I Miss You
  - Music by Kurt Bestor, Sam Cardon, Merrill B. Jenson

== Release and reception ==
As a theatrical release, The Seventh Brother began in theaters on 7 September 1995 in Germany and in on 4 April 1996 in Hungary. In 1997, the film was released on home video in the United States.

The English version was re-edited from the German and Hungarian versions, with Angie and her grandfather being established to be Tiny's owners toward the start, and the reason why he disappeared was because he tried chasing a frog rather than being dumped by his old owner, and they even go to try and find him when they realize he's missing but are unable to do so. Another change involves Dr. Albert E. Owl's role being expanded to him being the film's narrator and framing device rather than just being a storyteller owl. One scene where JC is shown fighting a silhouette of Mickey Mouse was removed from the English version for copyright reasons.

It was seen by over 150,000 viewers in Germany, and 3,042 in Switzerland's German-speaking region, during its original theatrical run.

Novelisations of the film were published in Germany (ISBN 3439904679) and Hungary (ISBN 9635488874).

== Sequel ==
A sequel titled Tiny Heroes (original Hungarian title: Vacak, az erdő hőse) was released in 1997.
