= Irén Henrik =

Hungarian cinematographer (1937–2026)

- Born: 11 June 1937; Budapest, Hungary
- Died: 30 June 2026 (aged 89)
- Occupation: Cinematographer
- Spouse: Attila Dargay (m. 1957; died. 2009)

Irén Henrik (11 June 1937 – 30 June 2026) was a Hungarian cinematographer. She was best known for her cinematography work in the 1977 animated film Mattie the Goose-boy, which was directed by her husband Attila Dargay.

Henrik died on 30 June 2026, at the age of 89.
