= Szaffi =

- Directed by: Attila Dargay
- Screenplay by: Attila Dargay; József Nepp; József Romhányi
- Based on: The Gypsy Baron by Mór Jókai
- Cinematography: Irén Henrik; Árpád Lossonczy
- Edited by: Magda Hap
- Production company: PannóniaFilm
- Distributed by: CINAR (Canada)
- Release dates: 11 April 1985 (Hungary); 14 September 1988 (US)
- Running time: 76 minutes
- Countries: Hungary; Canada; United States
- Languages: Hungarian; English

Szaffi (USA titled The Treasure of Swamp Castle) is a 1985 Hungarian-Canadian animated film directed by Attila Dargay. It is based on the 1885 book The Gypsy Baron by Mór Jókai, about the romance between a poor Hungarian aristocrat and a mysterious Romani-looking Turkish girl in the 18th century. Music from Johann Strauss II's operetta The Gypsy Baron, based on the same novel, is used for the film's soundtrack.

== Cast ==
Character	Original	English
Jónás Botsinkay (son)	András Kern	Adrian Knight (Jonathan)
Jónás Botsinkay (son)	Sándor Pálok (young)	Steven Bednarski (Young Jonathan)
Szaffi	Judit Pogány	Michelle Turmel (Sabrina)
Cafrinka (“old witch”)	Hilda Gobbi	Bronwen Mantel (Esmeralda)
Feuerstein	György Bárdy	Vlasta Vrána (Governor)
Puzzola	Gábor Maros	Arthur Grosser (Ollie)
Gáspár Botsinkay (father)	Ferenc Zenthe	Unknown (Sheik Ali Suleiman)
Ahmed	József Képessy	Walter Massey (Ahmed the Fearless)
Arzéna	Judit Hernádi	Jane Woods (Petunia Piglet)
Loncsár	László Csákányi	Unknown (Baron Piglet)
Menyus	János Gálvölgyi	Unknown (Manouche)
Gazsi bácsi	János Gálvölgyi	Unknown
Strázsa	János Gálvölgyi	Unknown
Savoyai Eugén	Sándor Suka	Unknown (General Tubthumper)
Adjutáns	András Márton	Unknown
Strázsamester	Gellért Raksányi	A.J. Henderson (Captain)
Asil	Zoltán Gera	Unknown
Puzzola anyja	Judit Czigány	Unknown (Ollie's Mother)
