= Maestro (2005 film) =

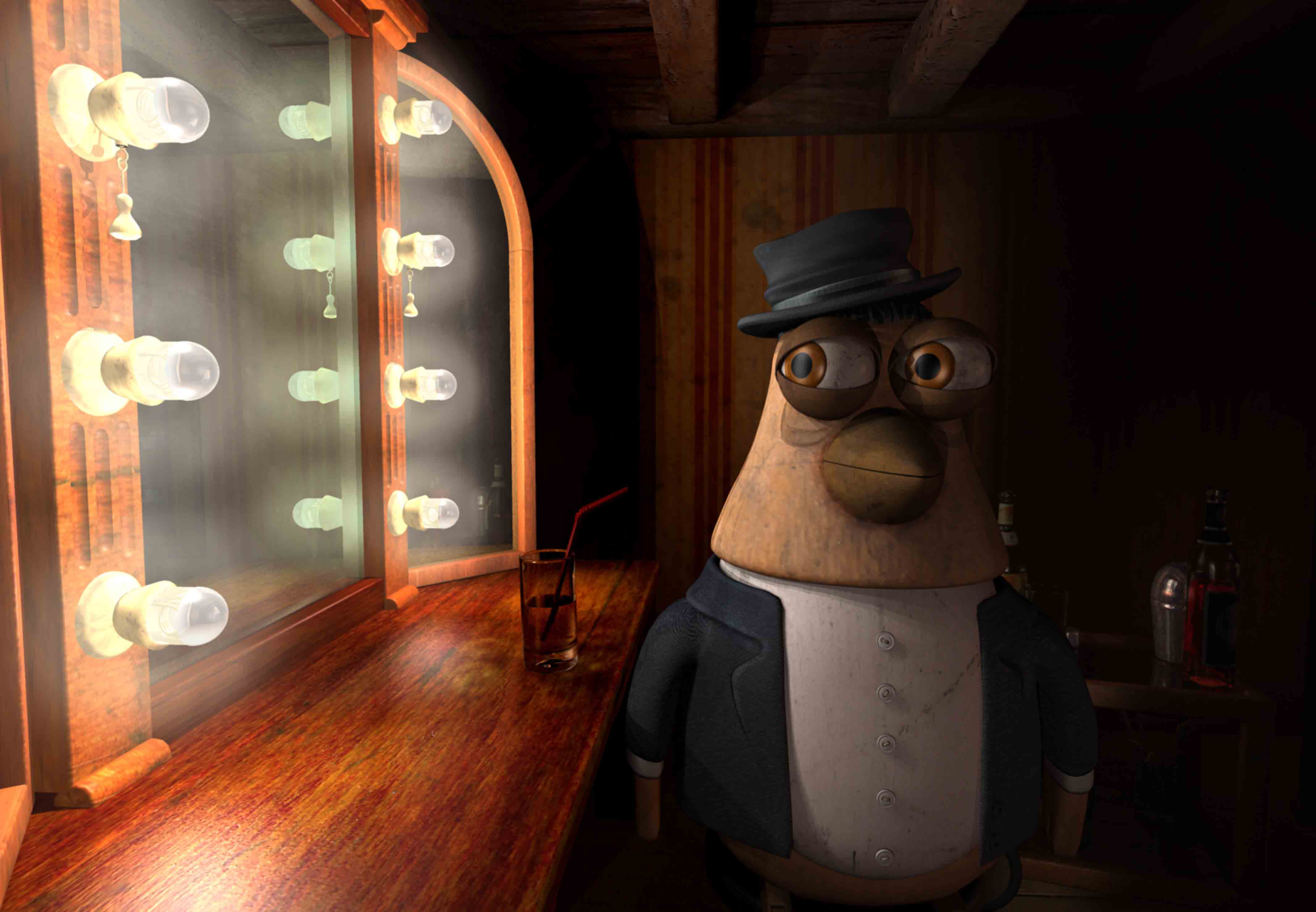
- Still from Maestro
- Directed by: Géza M. Tóth
- Written by: Géza M. Tóth
- Produced by: Géza M. Tóth
- Music by: Attila Pacsay
- Release date: 2005
- Country: Hungary

Maestro is a 2005 Hungarian computer-animated short film written, produced and directed by Géza M. Tóth. It won the Amaryllis Tamás Award at the 7th Kecskemét Animation Film Festival, and was nominated for Best Animated Short Film at the 79th Academy Awards in 2006, but lost to The Danish Poet.

Attila Pacsay wrote the film's music.

The film depicts the minutes before a "maestro"'s show and his preparation for it as aided by a mechanical assistant. It is noted for its use of CGI technology and surprise ending.
