= Zsolt Richly =

Hungarian animator (1941–2020)

Zsolt Richly (March 23, 1941 – 23 January 2020) was a Hungarian animator who worked as a director in PannóniaFilm. He was born in Sopron. His credits include the production of the A kockásfülű nyúl children's series. He also drew comics based on this series.

== Director ==
- Indiában (1966)
- Szvit (1968)
- A páva (1969)
- Medvetánc (1971)
- Molnár Anna (1972)
- A hétpöttyös autó (1973)
- A kecske és a kos (1974)
- A kockásfülű nyúl (1977)
- Háry János (1983)
- Kíváncsi Fáncsi (1984)
- Fabulák (1985)
- Este a székelyeknél (1998)
- Hommage á Vajda Lajos (1999)
- Árgyélus királyfi (2003)
- A hetvenkedő sün (2004)
- A kevély kiskakas (2006)
- Kőműves Kelemen (2009)
