= Ferenc Rófusz =

Hungarian animator (born 1946)

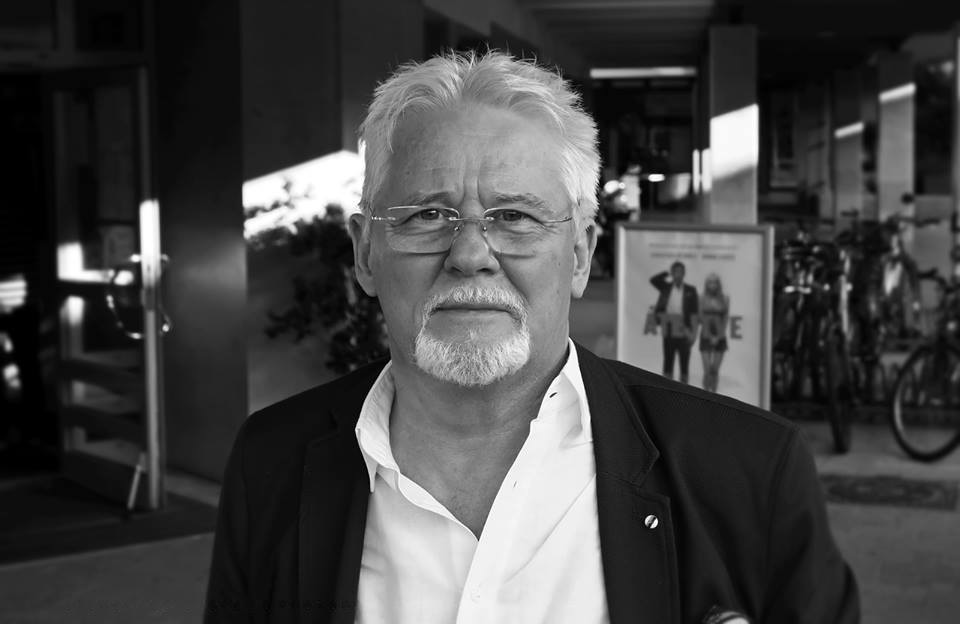
Photo by Gáspár Stekovics

Ferenc Rófusz (born 19 August 1946) is a Hungarian animator. He is known for the 1980 Academy Award-winning animated short The Fly.

== Biography ==
Rófusz was born in 1946 in Budapest. His interest in animation and film making started relatively early. During his studies he took special drawing and animating courses. He started to work at the Hungarian film studio Mafilm as set designer, set painter and animator. In 1968 he joined Pannónia Filmstúdió and partnered Marcell Jankovics on the animation project Gusztáv ("Gustavus"). In 1974 he made his first animated film A kő ("The Stone"), and six years later for A Légy ("The Fly") he received the 1981 Academy Award for Best Animated Short Film.

Hungary was a Communist country at the time, and Rófusz himself was not allowed to leave the country to attend the Oscars. However, without his knowledge, the director of the Hungarian film company, István Dósai presented himself as Rófusz and accepted the award during the show. Later that evening, he was debunked by one of Rófusz's friends, and thus the organizers forced Dósai to give back the award.

== Later works ==
In the early 1980s, Rófusz released two new animated films, Holtpont ("Deadlock", Stuttgart - Special Prize of the Jury 1984) and Gravitáció ("Gravity", OIAF Award, 1984). In 1988 he moved to Canada and began working at Toronto's Nelvana studio. In 2002 he returned to Hungary. Some of his recent works include Tüzet szüntess! ("Cease Fire!", 2003), A Dog’s Life (2005), and Ticket (2010), the latter of which won him the Children's Jury Award at the 10th Kecskemét Animation Film Festival.

== See also ==
- PannóniaFilm (Hungarian animation studio)
