= Pongrác Kacsóh =

Hungarian composer

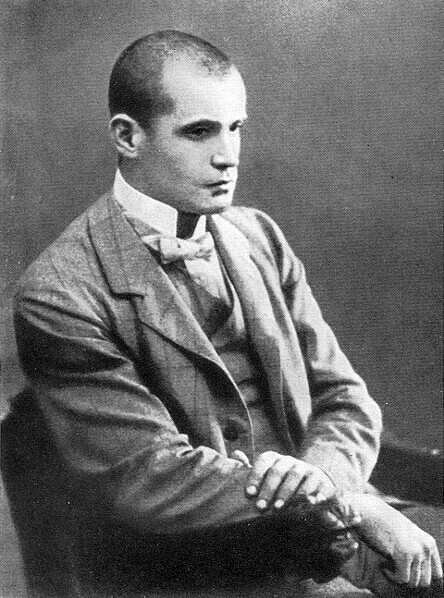
Kacsóh Pongrác

Pongrác Kacsóh (1873-1923) was a Hungarian composer. He is best known for his operetta based on Sándor Petőfi's János Vitéz to a libretto by Jenő Heltai.
