= 1977 Cannes Film Festival =

- Official poster of the 30th Cannes Film Festival, an original illustration by Polish painter Wojciech Siudmak.
- Opening film: The Bishop's Bedroom
- Closing film: Slap Shot
- Location: Cannes, France
- Founded: 1946
- Awards: Palme d'Or: Padre Padrone
- No. of films: 23 (In Competition)
- Festival date: 13 May 1977 – 27 May 1977
- Website: festival-cannes.com/en

Cannes Film Festival
- 1978 1976

The 30th Cannes Film Festival took place from 13 to 27 May 1977. Italian filmmaker Roberto Rossellini served as jury president for the main competition.

Italian filmmakers Paolo and Vittorio Taviani won the Palme d'Or, the festival's top prize, for their drama film Padre Padrone.

A new non-competitive section, Le Passé composé, was held only at this edition, focusing on compilations. This section, along with Les Yeux fertiles and L'Air du temps of the previous two years, were later integrated into the Un Certain Regard in 1978.

The festival opened with The Bishop's Bedroom by Dino Risi, and closed with Slap Shot by George Roy Hill.

== Juries ==
=== Main Competition ===
- Roberto Rossellini, Italian filmmaker - Jury President
- N'Sougan Agblemagnon, author
- Anatole Dauman, French producer
- Jacques Demy, French filmmaker
- Carlos Fuentes, Mexican writer
- Benoîte Groult, French writer
- Pauline Kael, American journalist and film critic
- Marthe Keller, Swiss actress
- Yuri Ozerov, Soviet filmmaker

== Official selection ==
=== In Competition ===
The following feature films competed for the Palme d'Or:

English title	Original title	Director(s)	Production country
3 Women		Robert Altman	United States
The American Friend	Der Amerikanische Freund	Wim Wenders	West Germany, France
An Average Little Man	Un borghese piccolo piccolo	Mario Monicelli	Italy
Backbone	Kičma	Vlatko Gilić	Yugoslavia
Bang!		Jan Troell	Sweden
Black Joy		Anthony Simmons	United Kingdom
Bound for Glory		Hal Ashby	United States
Budapest Tales	Budapesti mesék	István Szabó	Hungary
Car Wash		Michael Schultz	United States
The Duellists		Ridley Scott	United Kingdom
Elisa, My Life	Elisa, vida mía	Carlos Saura	Spain
Group Portrait with a Lady	Gruppenbild mit Dame	Aleksandar Petrović	West Germany, France
The Hunters	Οι Κυνηγοί	Theo Angelopoulos	Greece
Iphigenia	Ιφιγένεια	Michael Cacoyannis	Greece
J.A. Martin Photographer	J.A. Martin photographe	Jean Beaudin	Canada
The Lacemaker	La dentellière	Claude Goretta	France
The Lorry	Le camion	Marguerite Duras	France
The Old Country Where Rimbaud Died	Le Vieux pays où Rimbaud est mort	Jean Pierre Lefebvre	Canada, France
Padre Padrone		Paolo and Vittorio Taviani	Italy
The Purple Taxi	Un taxi mauve	Yves Boisset	France, Italy, Ireland
Solemn Communion	La Communion solennelle	René Féret	France
A Special Day	Una giornata particolare	Ettore Scola	Italy, Canada
Wounded Game	Подранки	Nikolai Gubenko	Soviet Union

=== Out of Competition ===
The following films were selected to be screened out of competition:

- Aïda by Pierre Jourdan
- All This and World War II by Susan Winslow (United States)
- Beethoven - Tage aus einem Leben by Horst Seemann (East Germany)
- La Bible by Marcel Carné (France) (documentary)
- The Bishop's Bedroom (La stanza del vescovo) by Dino Risi (Italy, France)
- Black Shadows on a Silver Screen by Ray Hubbard (United States)
- Bogart by Marshall Flaum (United States)
- Camelamos Naquerar (short) by Miguel Alcobendas (Spain)
- Carrara by Christian Paureilhe (France)
- Catherine by Paul Seban (France)
- The Children of Theatre Street (doc.) by Robert Dornhelm (United States)
- Cine Folies (documentary) by Philippe Collin (France)
- A Simple Heart by Giorgio Ferrara (Italy)
- Dearest Executioners (Queridísimos verdugos) by Basilio M. Patino (Spain)
- Des femmes et des nanas by Jean Pierre Marchand (France)
- Il gabbiano by Marco Bellocchio (Italy)
- Ha-Gan by Victor Nord (Israel)
- Harlan County, USA (doc.) by Barbara Kopple (United States)
- Heinrich by Helma Sanders-Brahms (West Germany)
- Les Lieux d'une fugue by Georges Perec (France) (short)
- Life Goes to the Movies (doc.) by Mel Stuart (United States)
- Mais qu'est ce qu'elles veulent? (doc.) by Coline Serreau (France)
- Meanwhile Back at the Ranch by Richard Patterson (United States)
- Moi Tintin (doc.) by Gérard Valet, Henri Roanne (France, Belgium)
- Mozart - Aufzeichnungen einer Jugend by Klaus Kirschner (West Germany)
- El mundo de Pau Casals by Jean Baptiste Bellsolell (Spain)
- The Naked Civil Servant by Jack Gold (United Kingdom)
- News from Home by Chantal Akerman (France)
- One Man by Robin Spry (Canada)
- Paradistorg by Gunnel Lindblom (Sweden)
- The Passionate Industry (doc.) by Joan Long (Australia)
- The Pictures That Moved (doc.) by Paul Andersen (Australia)
- Le Portrait de Dorian Gray by Pierre Boutron (France)
- Pumping Iron (doc.) by George Butler, Robert Fiore (United States)
- Le ragioni del successo by Luca Verdone (Italy)
- Raoni (doc.) by Jean-Pierre Dutilleux (France, Belgium, Brazil)
- Rhinoceros by Tom O'Horgan (United States, United Kingdom, Canada)
- Le Roi Pelé (doc.) by François Reichenbach (France)
- San Gottardo by Villi Hermann (Switzerland)
- Scott Joplin by Jeremy Paul Kagan (United States)
- Slap Shot by George Roy Hill (United States)
- That's Action by G. David Schine (documentary) (United States)
- Torre Bela by Thomas Harlan (Italy, Portugal)
- An Unfinished Piece for Mechanical Piano by Nikita Mikhalkov (Soviet Union)
- La vie au ralenti by Jean-Christophe Rose (France)

=== Short Films Competition ===
The following short films competed for the Short Film Palme d'Or:

- Arte tairona by Francisco Norden
- Di Cavalcanti by Glauber Rocha
- Envisage by Peter Foldes
- Küzdök by Marcell Jankovics
- Mao, by himself (Mao par lui-même) by René Viénet
- Rumble by Jules Engel
- Stille Post by Ivan Steiger

== Parallel sections ==
=== International Critics' Week ===
The following feature films were screened for the 16th International Critics' Week (16e Semaine de la Critique):

- Ben et Benedict by Paula Delsol (France)
- Caminandos pasos... Caminando by Federico Weingartshofer (Mexico)
- Ethnocide by Paul Leduc (Canada, Mexico)
- Liebe dans leben by Lutz Eisholz (West Germany)
- Le Meurtrier de la jeunesse by Kazuhizo Hasegawa (Japan)
- Omar Gatlato by Merzak Allouache (Algeria)
- Twenty Days Without War by Aleksey German (Soviet Union)

=== Directors' Fortnight ===
The following films were screened for the 1977 Directors' Fortnight (Quinzaine des Réalizateurs):

- 25 by Jose Celso Correa, Celso Luccas (Mozambique)
- Aftenlandet by Peter Watkins (Denmark)
- Ceddo by Ousmane Sembene (Senegal)
- Closet Children (Les enfants du placard) by Benoît Jacquot (France)
- The Devil Probably (Le diable probablement) by Robert Bresson (France)
- The Earth Is Flat (Erasmus Montanus Eller Jorden er flad) by Henrik Stangerup (Denmark)
- Fuera de aquí! by Jorge Sanjinés (Ecuador)
- Gizmo! by Howard Smith (United States)
- La Historia Me Absolvera by Gaetano Pagano (Sweden)
- The Hyena's Sun (Soleil des hyènes) by Ridha Behi (Netherlands, Tunisia)
- The Indians Are Still Far Away (Les indiens sont encore loin) by Patricia Moraz (France, Switzerland)
- Kilenc hónap by Marta Meszaros (Hungary)
- Living On (Continuar a Viver) (doc.) by António da Cunha Telles (Portugal)
- La muerte de Sebastián Arache y su pobre entierro by Nicolas Sarquis (Argentina)
- Near and Far Away (Långt borta och nära) by Marianne Ahrne (Sweden)
- Nós por cá Todos Bem by Fernando Lopes (Portugal)
- Ors Zein by Khaled Siddik (Kuwait, Sudan)
- Peking Duck Soup (Chinois, encore un effort pour être révolutionnaires) (doc.) by René Vienet (France)
- Prata Palomares by André Faria (Brazil)
- Why Shoot the Teacher? by Silvio Narizzano (Canada)
- Zero Hour (Stunde Null) by Edgar Reitz (West Germany)

Short films

- Claude Chauvy, l'art du tournage en bois by Jean-Pierre Bonneau (France)
- Eggs by John Hubley (United States)
- Hors-jeu by Georges Schwisgebel (Switzerland)
- Nights (Nyhtes) by Georges Katakouzinos (Greece)
- Sauf dimanches et fêtes by François Ode (France)
- Windy Day by John Hubley, Faith Hubley (United States)

== Official Awards ==
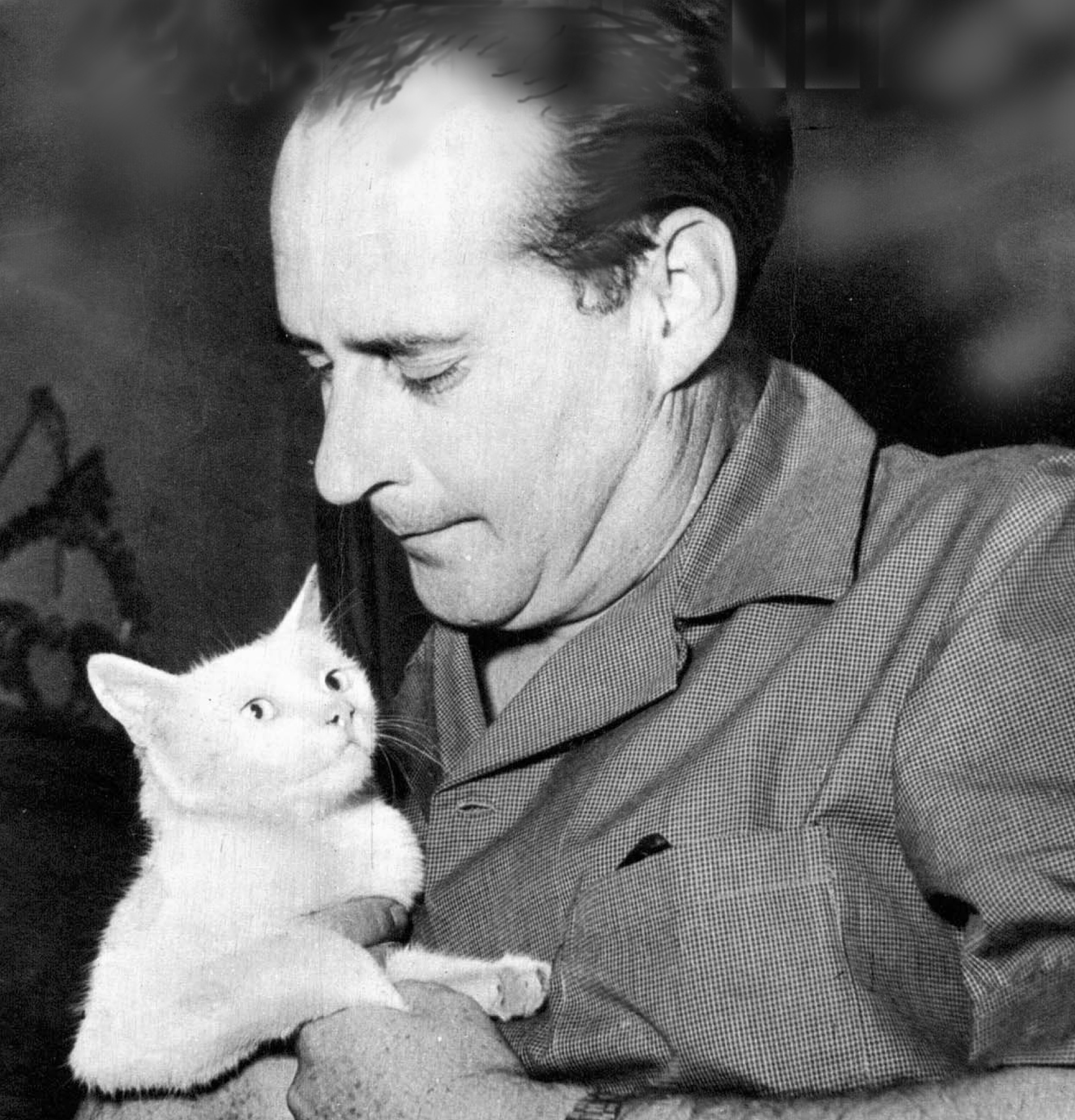
Roberto Rossellini, Jury President

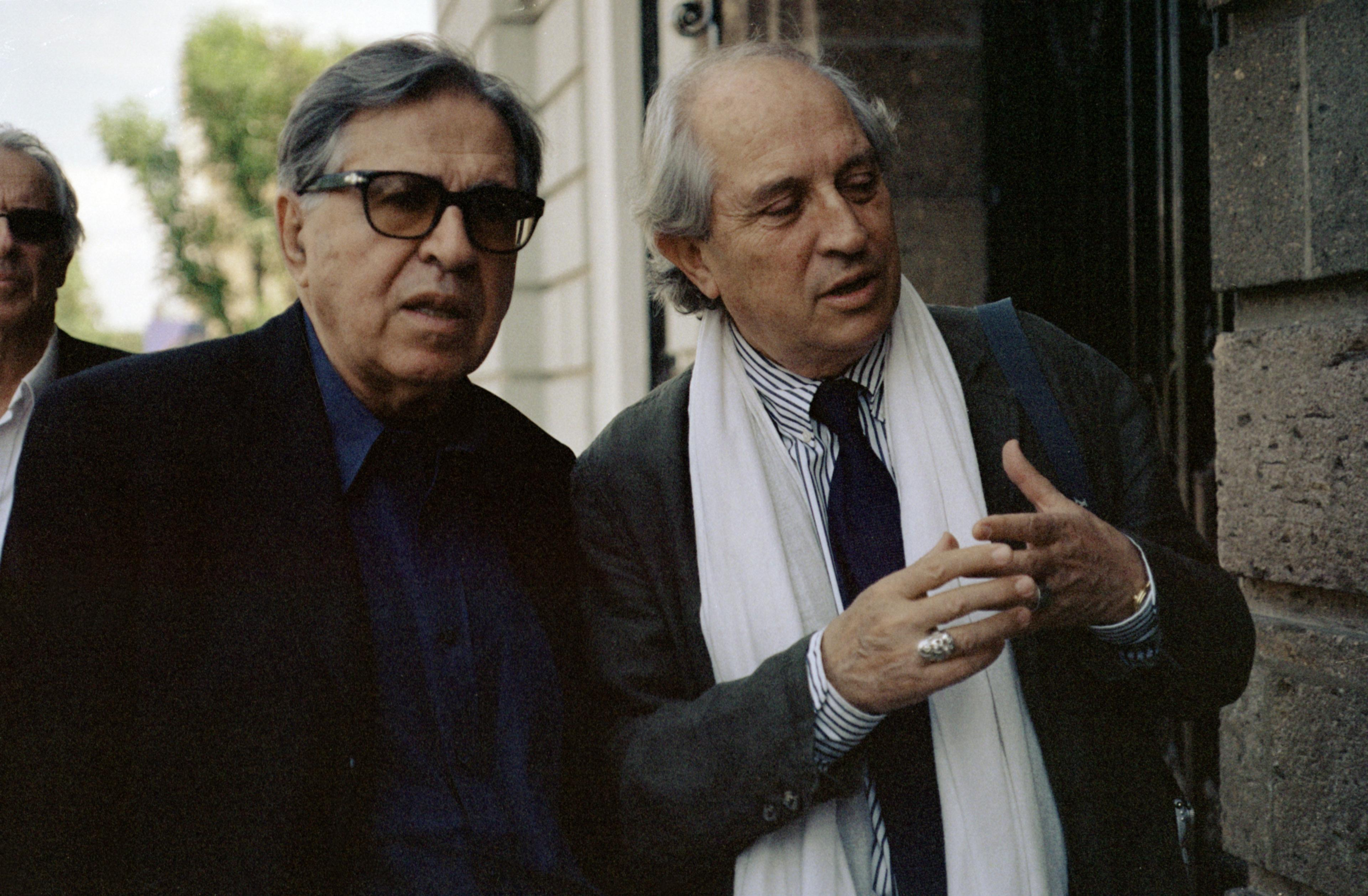
Palme d'Or winner Paolo Taviani with cinematographer Vittorio Storaro

=== In Competition ===
- Palme d'Or: Padre Padrone by Paolo and Vittorio Taviani
- Best Actress:
  - Shelley Duvall for 3 Women
  - Monique Mercure for J.A. Martin Photographer
- Best Actor: Fernando Rey for Elisa, vida mía
- Best First Work: The Duellists by Ridley Scott (Unanimously)
- Best Music: Norman Whitfield for Car Wash

=== Short Film Palme d'Or ===
- The Struggle by Marcell Jankovics
- Jury Prize: Di Cavalcanti by Glauber Rocha

== Independent Awards ==
=== FIPRESCI Prize ===
- Padre Padrone by Paolo and Vittorio Taviani (In competition)
- Kilenc hónap by Marta Meszaros (Directors' Fortnight)

=== Commission Supérieure Technique ===
- Technical Grand Prize: Car Wash by Michael Schultz

=== Prize of the Ecumenical Jury ===
- The Lacemaker by Claude Goretta
- J.A. Martin Photographer by Jean Beaudin

== Media ==
- INA: Opening of the 1977 festival (commentary in French)
- INA: Assessment of the 1977 Cannes festival (interview with France Roche in French)
- INA: Critics' reactions to the 1977 awards (commentary in French)
