= Mihály Fazekas =

Hungarian writer (1766–1828)

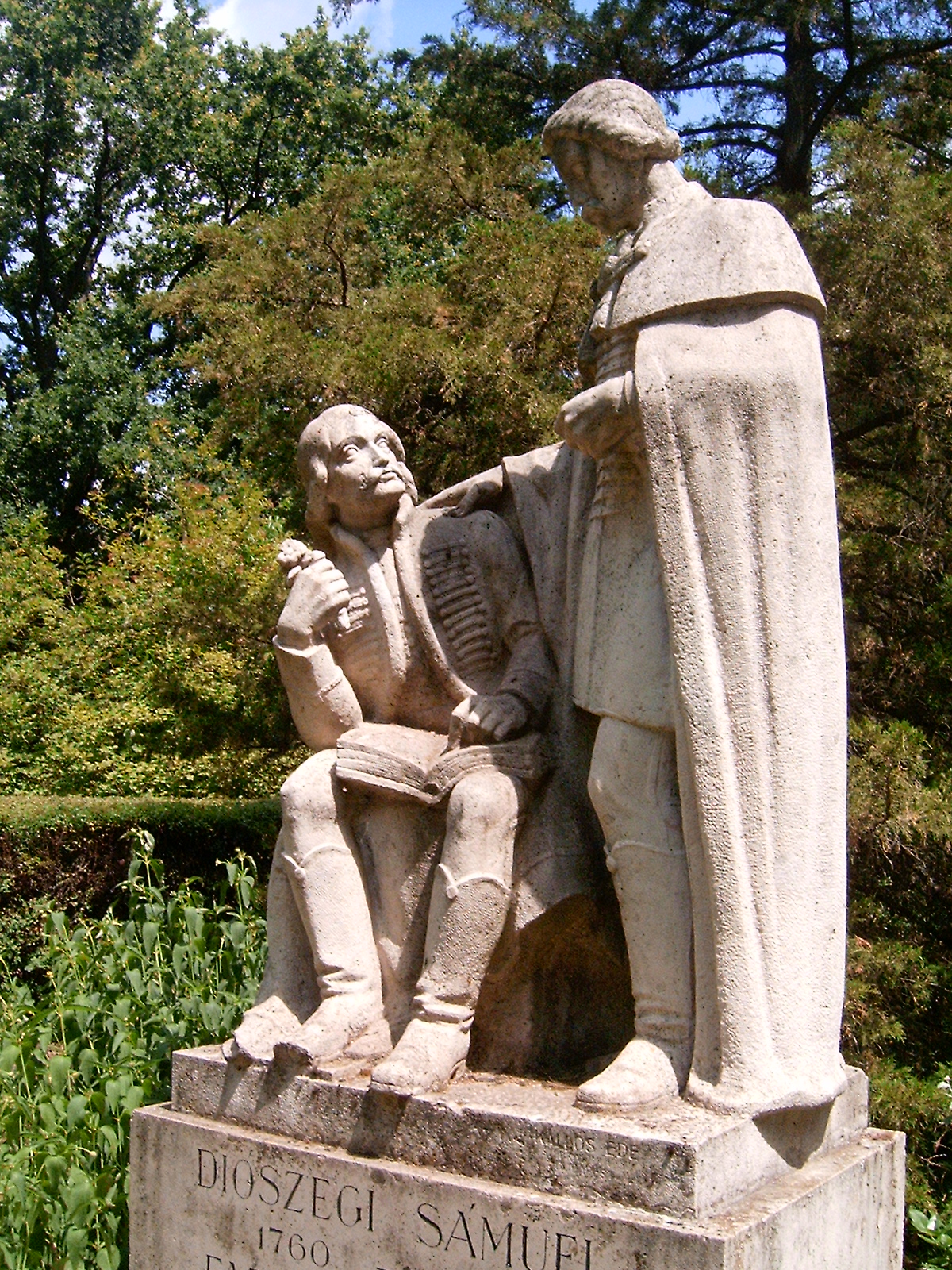
- Sculpture of Fazekas (sitting) and Sámuel Diószegi at the University of Debrecen
- Born: January 6, 1766; Debrecen, Grand Principality of Transylvania, Habsburg Empire
- Died: February 23, 1828 (aged 62); Debrecen, Grand Principality of Transylvania, Habsburg Empire
- Resting place: Debrecen public cemetery
- Writing career
- Genres: Song, narrative poetry
- Notable work: Lúdas Matyi

Mihály Fazekas (6 January 1766 – 23 February 1828) was a Hungarian writer from Debrecen. He was an army private for seven years before being commissioned as a Hussar officer. As a hobby, Fazekas studied the natural sciences (botany) and wrote poetry. His poetry expressed his disgust with warfare and violence, and brought to light the social injustices of his society.

Fazekas' epic poem Lúdas Matyi (Mattie the Goose-boy), written in 1804, was based on a folk-tale of inexact origins. In the story, Matyi, the main character, tries to sell his geese at the market, but runs into trouble with the servants of the local lord. The plot revolves around Matyi's scheme to get back at the lord. The story is popular because Matyi is the first commonfolk hero in Hungarian literature who is victorious over his social superior.

Fazekas' poem was made into a film in 1949. It was directed by Kálmán Nádasdy and starred the actors Imre Soós and Éva Ruttkai.

A memorial plaque to Fazekas still exists on the wall of the house at No. 58 Piac Street in Debrecen, where the author once lived. Fazekas died on 23 February 1828 in Debrecen.
