= Life Goes to the Movies =

1976 television documentary about American cinema

Life Goes to the Movies is a 1976 television documentary about American cinema directed by Mel Stuart.

It stars Shirley MacLaine, Henry Fonda, and Liza Minnelli as hosts.

The title references Life magazine, and covered movies during its run from 1936 to 1972.
