= David Kolin =

American actor

- Occupation: Actor
- Years active: 1977-present

David Kolin, better known as Dr. Dave, is a TV and radio veteran and former orthodontist who first became an on-air talent on the show “Made In New York” with Matt Lauer and Jill Rappaport. Kolin is known for two radio and comedy companies he created, DB Communications and United Stations Radio Networks.

== Early life ==
Kolin was born in Columbus, Georgia and lived in New York. Most of his childhood was spent in New York City. As a child, he listened to Don Imus and old radio broadcasts of the Shadow. Kolin attended New York University for his undergraduate degree, New York University for his DDS, and Fairleigh Dickinson University for Orthodontics.

== Career ==
Kolin’s first experience on the radio began when Scott Shannon offered him a job at Z100 for $25/week writing, producing, and voicing comedy. That arrangement didn't last long as the station went from worst to first in less than three months. Suddenly there were dozens of stations copying that Top 40 Z100 format. As a result, Kolin had a built in syndication network which grew to 3 formats of comedy for the biggest names in radio including Rick Dees in LA and John Lander in Houston. Kolin co-hosted the John Lander Q Morning Zoo in Houston as well as a syndicated weekend show, "John Landers Hit mUsic USA." Kolin started a radio syndication company, DB Communications which eventually became part of the United Stations Radio Networks.

=== Television ===
Kolin teamed with manager Rosy Rosegarten early on to secure a spot on Made in NY on Fox TV. That led to a spot on A Current Affair with Maury Povich as a Field Producer and daily on air comedy talent. When Dr. Dave and his partner Steve Kerper broke into the broadcast to take over A Current Affair for one episode, Pirate TV was born. Sold to MTV at NATPE, Pirate TV ran on MTV in half hour and 1 hour formats. The pair formed Pirate Productions, a TV production company. Super agent Ari Emanuel placed Dr Dave and his partner on HBO with Hardcore TV which was optioned to Miramax as a feature film.

Dr. Dave teamed up with his wife Louise Violano when she founded Beacon Creations in 2000 and went on to produce numerous shows and pilots for FOX, CBS, E! Entertainment Network, Sony Television, and most recently The Navy Chef Challenge on the Food Network. Dave and Louise founded The Netwitts with Spruce Henry to produce 60 video webisode segments for ComedyNet.com, an all comedy broadband network, and 57 comedy animations for Uglystepchild.com, an animated comedy website they now own. Most recently, Dr. Dave is one of the founders of Content Swarm Inc. a video search and user-generated content rating engine.

=== Radio ===
In 1994, Dr. Dave partnered with Nick Verbitsky and Dick Clark in the formation of United Stations Radio Networks using Dave's former syndication company, DB Communications as its nucleus. The company grew tenfold. Kolin was on the board of directors of United Stations Radio Networks , Executive VP in charge of Comedy programming, as well as Executive Producer of the Pulse Comedy Show Prep. Kolin sued USRN in 2013 for breach of contract, and joined Premiere Networks.
