= Mattie the Goose-boy (1977 film) =

- Theatrical release poster
- Directed by: Attila Dargay
- Screenplay by: Attila Dargay; József Nepp; József Romhányi
- Based on: a poem by Mihály Fazekas
- Cinematography: Irén Henrik
- Edited by: Magda Hap
- Music by: Tamás Daróczi Bárdos
- Production company: PannóniaFilm
- Release dates: April 7, 1977 (Hungary); September 22, 1978 (US)
- Running time: 75 minutes
- Countries: Hungary; United Kingdom; United States
- Languages: Hungarian; English

Mattie the Goose-boy (Hungarian: Lúdas Matyi) is a 1977 Hungarian animated film directed by Attila Dargay. It is based on the eponymous poem, written in 1804 by Mihály Fazekas.

== Synopsis ==
Mattie, a cheerful peasant boy with his grazing goose, wanders into the forest of Lord Blackheart. The landlord's soldiers start chasing the goose because they think it is a white wild goose. Both of them are captured and the goose is judged to be the property of Blackheart, who in turn deals Mattie twenty-five lashes. After the punishment, he vows to hit him back three times.

The payback will come in time. Blackheart is building when Mattie appears in the disguise of an Italian carpenter. The lord takes the master to his forest to find suitable trees, and he selects enough for Blackheart's whole entourage to set to the tedious work. When no one is left, Mattie ties him to a tree and beats him.

The second beating: Blackheart is still lying in a sickbed from the previous punishment when the soldiers bring a big-nosed, bespectacled German soldier doctor into his presence. The "doctor" examines the gentleman and sends the servants to collect herbs. Mattie, stripped of his disguise, beats up Blackheart again.

For the expected final beating, the terrified Blackheart surrounds himself with a strong guard. When the fair opens somewhere, he does visit the place - but first he sends some soldiers to look for disguises. This time, Mattie is not wearing an incognito, so no one pays any attention to him. A friend takes the goose for himself, so he looks like Mattie the Goose-boy. While they are unsuccessfully chasing him, the real Mattie catches Blackheart and beats him a third time in front of the crowd.

== Cast ==
Character	Original	English
Mattie the goose-boy	András Kern	Unknown
Mattie the goose-boy	Péter Geszti (young)	Unknown
Lord Blackheart	László Csákányi	Unknown
Bailiff	Gábor Agárdi	Unknown
Main Soldier	Antal Farkas	Unknown
Soldier I	László Csurka	Unknown
Soldier II	Gellért Raksányi	Unknown
Loader	Sándor Suka	Peter Hawkins
Auntie Berry	Hilda Gobbi	Unknown
Dentist	László Inke	Unknown
Old rider	Ferenc Zenthe	Peter Hawkins
Horserider	János Garics	Unknown
Narrator	Károly Mécs	Unknown

== Trivia ==
This film was dubbed in Arabic under the title "ياسر والشهبندر" (Yasser and Shahbandar) but instead of being released as a movie, it was released as a 4-episode series.
