= Marcell Jankovics =

Hungarian film director (1941–2021)

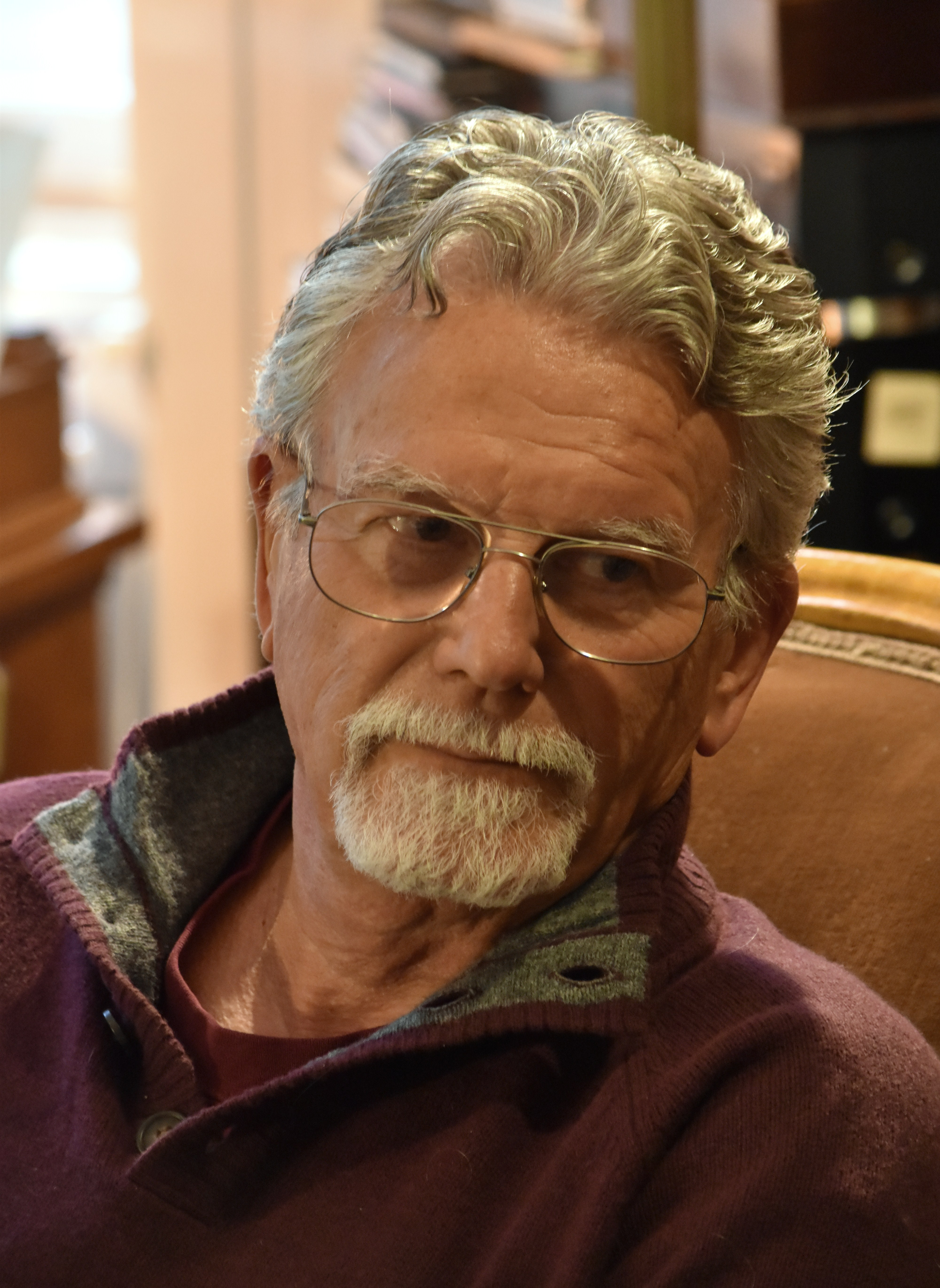
- Jankovics in 2016
- Born: 21 October 1941; Budapest, Kingdom of Hungary
- Died: 29 May 2021 (aged 79); Budapest, Hungary
- Notable work: Johnny Corncob, Son of the White Mare, The Tragedy of Man
- Awards: Leonardo da Vinci World Award of Arts (2009)

Marcell Jankovics (21 October 1941 – 29 May 2021) was a Hungarian graphic artist, film director, animator and author. He is best known for the animated films Johnny Corncob (1973; the first animated feature of his native country) and Son of the White Mare (1981; cited as one of the best animated films ever made).

== Life and career ==
Jankovics was born on 21 October 1941 in Budapest, Hungary. From 1955 he attended the Pannonhalma Benedictine Secondary School. He started working at Pannónia in 1960.

In 1973, he wrote and directed Hungary's first ever animated feature film, Johnny Corncob, based on the 1845 narrative poem John the Valiant by Sándor Petőfi. His fourth feature film The Tragedy of Man was in production from 1988 until its release in 2011. He died on 29 May 2021.

== Accolades and legacy ==
He received his Oscar nomination for the 1974 animated short film Sisyphus. That film was used for a GMC Yukon Hybrid ad during the 2008 Super Bowl based on an agreement between the Hungarian film studio Pannónia and GM. He also received a Palme d'Or for the short film The Struggle at the 1977 Cannes Film Festival. He has been presented multiple awards at the Kecskemét Animation Film Festival since 1985. In 2009, he was presented with the Leonardo da Vinci World Award of Arts. In 2021, he received the posthumous Lifetime Achievement Award from the CineFest Miskolc International Film Festival.

Son of the White Mare was placed #49 on the Olympiad of Animation in 1984.

Animation historian Charles Solomon listed The White Mare's Son as one of the best animated films of the 1980s.

== Filmography ==
His filmography includes:

- Johnny Corncob (János vitéz) (1973)
- Sisyphus (1974)
- The Struggle (Küzdők) (1977)
- Son of the White Mare (Fehérlófia) (1981)
- A Székely asszony és az ördög ("The Transylvanian Woman and the Devil") (1985) - Winner of the 1st KAFF Prize for Best Series.
- Hol volt, hol nem volt ("A Hungarian Fairy Tale") (1987)
- Tangram (1988) - Winner of the KAFF Award for Best Animation.
- Magyar népmesék ("Hungarian Folk Tales") (1988-1996) - Jankovics was awarded the KAFF Prize for Best Film Series together with Zsuzsanna Kricskovics for their work on the episode entitled "Mindent járó malmocska" ("Mill Film"). He would go on to win the KAFF Prize for Best TV Series with Mária Horvát in 1996 for their work on the episode entitled "A pityke és a kökény" ("The Han and the Wild Plum")
- Jankula (1993) - Winner of the KAFF Award for the Category of Cultural History
- Ének a Csodaszarvasról ("Song of the Miraculous Hind") (2002) - Winner of the KAFF-Sponsored Award of the National Radio and Television Commission.
- Az ember tragédiája ("The Tragedy of Man") (2011) - Jankovics was awarded the KAFF Prize for Best Visual Language for the sequence entitled "Egy jottányit sem!" ("Not an iota!") from Az ember tragédiája VII. szín ("The Tragedy of Man Part 7), and the Jury's Special Mention at the 8th Festival of European Animated Feature Films and TV Specials for this work.
- Toldi (2022)
