= The Fly (1980 film) =

1980 Hungarian animated short film

- Written by: Ferenc Rófusz
- Directed by: Ferenc Rófusz
- Country of origin: Hungary
- Original language: None

Production
- Producer: Ferenc Rófusz
- Cinematography: Zoltán Bacsó
- Editor: János Czipauer
- Running time: 3 minutes
- Production company: MAFILM Pannónia Filmstúdió

Original release
- Release: 1980

The Fly (original title A légy) is a 1980 Hungarian animated short film. It is unrelated to the 1958 film of the same name or to its 1986 remake.

== Summary ==
A film without words, seen from the perspective of a fly who finds itself in a house on an autumn day.

== Filming process ==
Fly consists of nearly 4,000 crayon drawings inspired by a series of photos captured with a fisheye lens.

== Accolades ==
The film won the Academy Award for Best Animated Short Film at the 53rd Academy Awards. This is the first Hungarian film to win an Oscar.
