= János vitéz =

1844 epic poem by Sándor Petőfi

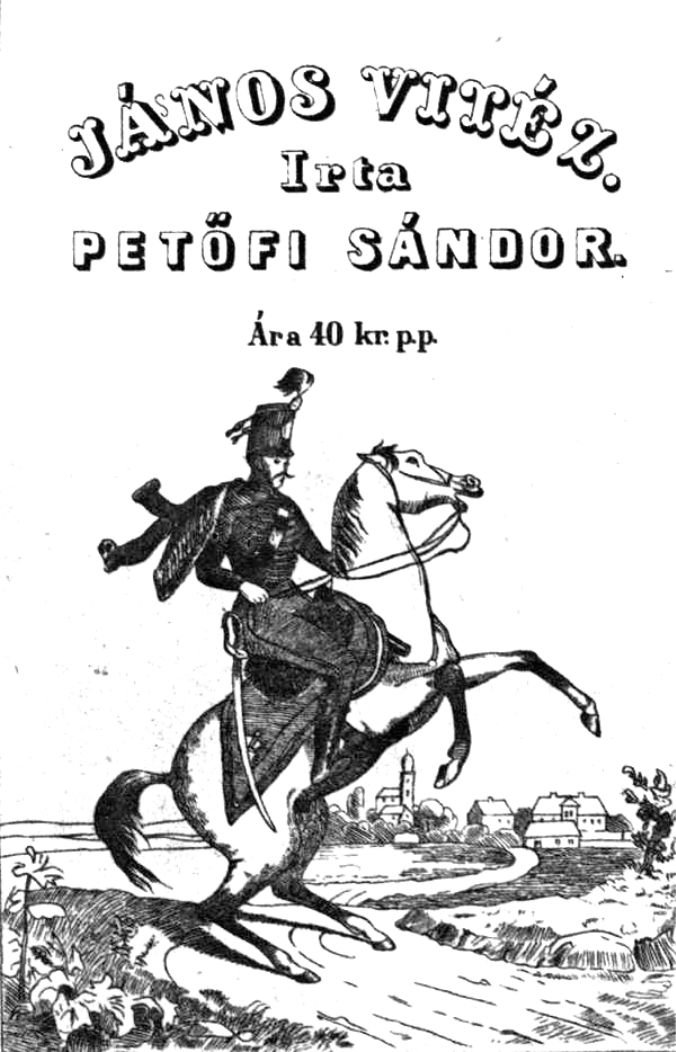
The original cover to János vitéz by Soma Orlai Petrich

János vitéz ("John the Valiant") is an epic poem written in Hungarian by Sándor Petőfi. It was written in 1844, and is notable for its length, 370 quatrains divided into 27 chapters, and for its wordplay. It is a story of the young shepherd who is forced to leave his home and undergoes adventures as he defeats the villains such as Turks and witches while searching for his true love. Petőfi took large inspiration from Homer's Odyssey.

The poem has gained immense popularity in Hungary, and is today considered a classic of Hungarian literature. It was adapted into a popular operetta by Pongrác Kacsóh in 1904 and into the animated feature film Johnny Corncob, the first of its kind in Hungary, in 1973.

== Plot ==
Kukoricza Jancsi ("Johnny Maize") is found abandoned in a corn field as an infant; he is taken in by a peasant landowner, and by his adolescent years, is a shepherd for his master. He is in love with an orphan girl, Iluska, who is being raised by her envious stepmother. Jancsi and Iluska hope to be married, but once, while they are spending time together, many of his sheep wander away, and he is chased from the village by his master.

Dejected, he joins a company of hussar cavalrymen en route to France to fight the Turkish invasion there. The hussars journey from Hungary to France (crossing the many, heavily fictionized countries in between, such as Venice, India and Mongolia, where they arrive just in time for the battle. Jancsi saves the French princess from capture, and the king in gratitude offers him her hand in marriage and the kingdom to rule. Jancsi turns the offers down, telling the king about his love for Iluska; the king then gives him a reward of gold, and names him János vitéz ("Sir John").

János travels back to Hungary by boat, only to learn that Iluska has been worked to death by her cruel stepmother. In memory of her, he plucks the single rose growing from her grave and keeps it. He then sets off on a series of increasingly more dangerous adventures, hoping to end his life in some glorious feat. He reaches the Land of the Giants, where he kills the king in his castle and has all the other giants pledge fealty to him. Later, he arrives in the Country of Darkness that is ruled by evil witches. He calls on his mighty giant vassals to help him wipe them out. As each witch dies, the forest becomes a little brighter, and János notices that one of them is Iluska's stepmother. She is the last to be destroyed, leaving the land in full daylight.

After several years of further wandering, which includes him slaying a dragon, János finally emerges at the end of the world, the coast of the Óperenciás sea (a traditional uncrossable ocean in Hungarian folklore). He again calls a giant, this time to wade across with him on his shoulder. They arrive at an island after two weeks, which turns out to be the Land of the Fairies. János, unable to feel happy without Iluska, wants to kill himself in a small lake, and tosses the rose in first. At this moment, it turns out that the lake contains the Water of Life: the rose changes into the form of Iluska. Reunited, the two lovers get married at once, and the fairies proclaim them king and queen. They live happily ever after.

== Translation ==
John Ridland, professor of English at University of California, Santa Barbara, released a complete, rhyming English translation in 1999 entitled John the Valiant. The translation made efforts to retain the informalities and tone of the original, such as rendering "Kukorica Jancsi" as "Johnny Grain o'Corn" and "Illuska" as "Nelly" or "Nel". Ridland received several honors for his work, including the Balint Balassi Memorial Award presented by the Consul-General of Hungary to the United States. The work has since been made available online for free.

== Musical adaptation ==
Pongrác Kacsóh was a composer and lyricist who had previously set a folk tale to music (Csipkerózsika). In 1904, he wrote János vitéz, an adaptation of Petőfi's poem, which was to become his greatest success.

The operetta differed from the poem in several important ways. Most of all, it had a much stronger Hungarian nationalist undercurrent, revealed most explicitly in the ending.

- A new character is introduced: Bagó, a friend of Jancsi and his would-be rival for Iluska's heart. As Iluska makes her choice extremely clear, the sorrowful Bagó joins the hussars at the beginning of the story.
- Jancsi is made less responsible for the disaster that leads to his exile. In the book, he is neglecting his duties to spend time with Iluska, and the herd wanders off on its own. In the operetta, the stepmother hires another shepherd to lead the herd to stampede.
- Petőfi was a Francophile, and the French in János vitéz are portrayed as a noble country which simply happens to be under siege. In Kacsóh's adaptation, they are extraordinarily cowardly and effeminate, to comic effect: the army is in constant retreat, and the king throws a tantrum when he cannot find his smoking pipe. The princess, the only person of any courage, sings a song about how she would love to be a man so that she, at least, could ride into battle.
- It is Bagó who delivers the news of Iluska's death to János, during the middle of the victory celebration; he and János sing a sorrowful duet about the rose. They then go off together to find her, be she “in heaven or in hell.”
- The giants and the witches are entirely left out. Instead, the two wanderers have a run-in with the devil in the middle of a forest, who has no luck leading them away from their quest.
- The wanderers discover the Spring of Life in the middle of a seemingly endless forest after seven years of searching; the Óperencian ocean is entirely left out. Nearby lives Iluska's stepmother, who tries to dissuade them from discovering the fountain's true nature; they discover that she is a witch, and she flies away.
- After Iluska's resurrection, the two lovers are wed by the fairies, and rule as king and queen. The only caveat is that if they should ever leave the kingdom, they will never be let back in. Bagó, who cannot share in the couple's mutual happiness, decides to return to his village. The celebrations are interrupted by the sound of Bagó's flute-playing as he begins his journey back (mirroring the interruption of the French victory celebration). The sound mesmerizes János, who is at first unsure what he is hearing; when Iluska tells him that it is only Bagó, János delivers the operetta's last soliloquy: “It calls me – and you! Do you not hear it? Do you hear? It is the sound of the sheep – the song of the harvesters. It calls me home. I must go!” Iluska decides to go with János, and they depart for their homeland.

The ending is the most obviously different, as János decides to abandon immortality, eternal bliss, and even Iluska to return to his village. The sacredness of the Hungarian homeland was a common motif in art of the time, designed to keep nationalism alive in Hungarians under the yoke of Habsburg rule. While it is a clear departure from Petőfi's original, it is not entirely out of line with the rest of the poet's body of work, who was himself a fiery nationalist (having started, and died in the Hungarian Revolution of 1848).
