= Kálmán Nádasdy =

Hungarian film director (1904–1980)

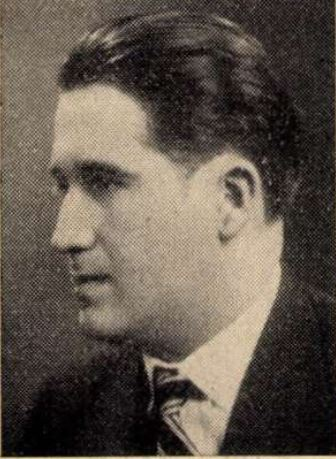
- Born: 25 November 1904; Budapest, Austria-Hungary
- Died: 17 April 1980 (aged 75); Budapest, Hungary
- Other name: Nádasdy Kálmán
- Occupation: Film director
- Years active: 1939-1953

Kálmán Nádasdy (25 November 1904 – 17 April 1980) was a Hungarian film director. In 1959, he was a member of the jury at the 1st Moscow International Film Festival. His son was the linguist and poet Ádám Nádasdy.

== Selected filmography ==
- The Armchair (1939)
- Gül Baba (1940)
- Magdolna (1942)
- Lúdas Matyi (1950)

== Bibliography ==
- Burns, Bryan. World Cinema: Hungary. Fairleigh Dickinson University Press, 1996.
- Cunningham, John. Hungarian Cinema: From Coffee House to Multiplex. Wallflower Press, 2004.
