= Attila Dargay =

Hungarian animator (1927–2009)

- Born: June 20, 1927; Mezőnyék
- Died: October 20, 2009 (aged 82); Budapest, Hungary
- Occupation: Animator
- Spouse: Irén Henrik (m. 1957)

Attila Dargay (June 20, 1927 – October 20, 2009) was a Hungarian comics artist and animator.

== Life ==
Dargay was born in Mezőnyék. He began working as a scenery painter for the Hungarian National Theatre in the late 1940s. He directed such animations productions as Hajra, Mozdony! (1972), Mattie the Goose-boy (1977), The Little Fox (1981), The Treasure of Swamp Castle (1985), and Captain of the Forest (1988). He studied at the College of Fine Arts in Budapest until 1948 when he was discharged because of political reasons. From 1951 he worked as a stage setting painter at Hungary's National Theatre, and in parallel he worked as a trainee on animated films, from 1954 he worked as a cartoon planner. He became an animated-film director in 1957, his first independent director-piece being the Don't give in little man! (Ne hagyd magad emberke!) in 1959. He started working at the then formed Pannonia Film Studio in 1957. His films are popular among both children and adults. He is also author of several animated books and comic strips. His best known strip figure is dog Kajla (Kajla kutya). His good humour reflects in all his works, which made all generations laugh among his audience. In 2008, his most known animated movie was re-filmed by György Gát, but Dargay did not approve using his original characters because he did not agree with the spirit of the new movie. He died a year later, aged 82 in Budapest.

== Selected films ==
=== Director ===
- Dióbél királyfi (1963)
- The Three Rabbits (A három nyúl (1972))
- Hajra, Mozdony! (1972)
- Mattie the Goose-boy (Lúdas Matyi (1977))
- Vuk (1981)
- The Treasure of the Swamp Castle (Szaffi (1984))
- Captain of the Forest (Az erdő kapitánya (1988))
- Dragon and Slippers (Sárkány és papucs (1989))
- A préri pacsirtája (1991)

=== Writer ===
- The Seventh Brother (A hetedik testvér) (1991)

=== Dramaturg ===
- Willy the Sparrow (Vili, a veréb) (1989)
