= Johnny Corncob =

1973 Hungarian animated film

- Theatrical release poster
- Directed by: Marcell Jankovics
- Screenplay by: Marcell Jankovics; Tamás Sipos; Péter Szoboszlay
- Based on: János vitéz by Sándor Petőfi
- Cinematography: Zoltán Bacsó; Attila Csepela; Irén Henrik; Klári Kassai; Csaba Nagy
- Edited by: János Czipauer; Katalin Gyöpös; Katalin Szakács
- Release date: 1 May 1973
- Running time: 74 minutes
- Country: Hungary
- Language: Hungarian

Johnny Corncob (Hungarian: János vitéz) is a 1973 Hungarian animated adventure film directed by Marcell Jankovics.

== Summary ==
Johnny Corncob tells the story of a young man who goes on an adventure as a soldier, while longing to be reunited with the woman he loves. The film is based on the 1845 epic poem János vitéz by Sándor Petőfi. It was the first Hungarian animated feature film.

== Cast ==
- György Cserhalmi as Jancsi (Johnny)
- Anikó Nagy as Iluska (his girlfriend)
- Erzsi Pártos as the Mostoha (Iluska's step-mother)
- Antal Farkas as the Gazda (farmer)
- Gábor Mádi Szabó as the Haramiavezér (bandit leader)
- György Bárdy as the Hussar Captain
- János Körmendi as the French king
- Erzsébet Kútvölgyi as the Princess

== Production ==
The film was commissioned by the Hungarian government for the 150th anniversary of Sándor Petőfi's birth. It was produced by Pannonia Film Studio and was Hungary's first ever animated feature film. It was made by a team of 130 people and took 22 months to produce. The film's visual style was inspired by Hungarian folk art and George Dunning's 1968 film Yellow Submarine, a favorite of the director.

== Legacy ==
In HBTV, the cartoon was set to Poco's "Crazy Love" and Stevie Wonder's "Whereabouts" even though it was not a Hanna-Barbera cartoon. This is because Hanna-Barbera had the distribution rights to the film at the time. Hanna-Barbera originally intended to release the film in the United States under the title "Forever Like The Rose". The film was planned to be released in 1978 but was ultimately shelved.

It is included as an extra on the Blu-ray edition of Jankovics's 1981 epic Son of the White Mare.
