= History of Hungarian animation =

The history of Hungarian animation begins in 1914 and carries through to the modern day. Starting with short promotional cartoons prior to the two World Wars, Hungarian animation underwent a sporadic and halting development during the turbulent war years which were characterized in large part by the emigration of much of the field's top talent. This exodus slowed dramatically during the 1950s when the Hungarian Communist Party took power and the Iron Curtain took shape.

With Communism came nationalization of the Hungarian animation studio—a fact that was to prove a mixed blessing for the nascent industry. While political pressures would strongly dictate the kinds of topics that animation could cover in the early years, state funding meant that even the relatively small postwar nation would be able to prove itself on the international stage. Indeed, subsequent to the 1956 revolution, the softening effects of Goulash Communism helped enable artists to begin to express themselves such that by the late 1970s, Pannónia Film Stúdió would rank among the top 5 major cartoon studios alongside Walt Disney, Hanna-Barbera, Soyuzmultfilm, and Toei.

With the end of Communism in 1989, state control of the animation industry dropped away and market forces prompted the rise of numerous independent animation studios. Lacking state funding and receiving mixed international response, Hungarian animation studios today have had to develop financing strategies consisting largely of working as production and development companies performing labor-intensive animation activities such as compositioning and inking for foreign studios. Despite this, Hungarian films continue to be produced every few years.

== Overview ==
The history of Hungarian animation extends from its origin in István Kató Kiszly's 1914 cut-out caricatures to the modern time. Although a few boldly experimental films were made in the early years, it would not be until the 1930s that actual animation studios would be formed (under figures like Gyula Macskássy and János Halász) to produce promotional material in the form of newsreels and advertisements. International conflicts during both world wars as well as turbulent political climates in the pre-Iron Curtain period led to the emigration of many of Hungary's animation artists who famously established themselves in places like France, the U.K., and America. During the Communist era, all animation efforts are nationalized first as Magyar Szinkronfilmgyártó Vállalat in 1948 and later as Pannónia Film Stúdió in 1959. State control of animation on the one hand constrained artistic freedom of expression while simultaneously ensuring the survival of the medium.

During the 1950s, the first modern generation of Hungarian animators came to prominence, creating primarily short animations depicting the Hungarian folk tales and legends that would be a politically safe mainstay of Hungarian animation output throughout the Communist era. This generation would be responsible for creating the first colored animation. A second generation of animators would emerge in the 1960s under the less repressive system of Goulash Communism, and sociopolitical sentiment was for the first time gently hinted at as cartoons developed philosophical themes characterized by morbidity and black humor. Foreign animation studios began to reach out to Pannónia Film Stúdió during this period to subcontract some of the more laborious elements of cartoon production such as compositioning and inking. This introduced the concept of cartoon series/serials, and soon a number of Hungarian serials were created introducing the country's first recognizable cartoon character stars. This period also saw the production of the first adult animation. The 1970s saw the rise of a third generation of animators even more intent on commentary on the social conditions in the country. Animations during this period were often marked by a muted subsurface emphasis on anxiety and a claustrophobic fear of persecution while the animation works of older (first and second generation) animators tended to emphasize morality and a development of the grotesque. This third generation would see the emergence of the country's first feature-length films as Pannónia Film Stúdió rose to international renown as one of the top 5 major cartoon studios alongside Walt Disney, Hanna-Barbera, Soyuzmultfilm, and Toei.

The 1980s would prove to be a peak of Hungarian animation efforts. Increasingly bold use of irony and allegory portrayed the Hungarian condition under Communist rule and during this period a number of Hungarian films received high accolades and prestigious awards including Ferenc Rofusz' 1981 Oscar for A Légy ("The Fly"). The decade would also mark a renaissance in technical experimentation with the exploration of many non-traditional graphic media such as plasticine, sand, coal, textiles, and computer animation. During this period the first feature-length films based on serials were created and proved to be quite popular. In 1989, Communist rule was cast off and with it State control of the animation arts in 1990. Due to free market pressures, a number of independent animation studios sprang up in the wake. The novel issue of commercial financing proved to be a complex one as new studios struggled to make ends meet. A variety of solutions were adopted ranging from the active courting of foreign contract work, to specialization in the labor-intensive traditional hand-animation forms, to employee ownership. In 2002, the new Hungarian government began to take a role in the medium as well with funding from the Ministry of National Cultural Heritage going toward the development of further animations of Hungarian folk tales and legends which since the Communist era have become a source of national pride.

== Pre-animation history ==
- 1709 - Professor István Simándi of Sárospatak assembled and used his own projector (a variant of the magic lantern) for educational purposes. With this machine Simándi aimed to bring about the same animation effect as transparencies do today.
- 1889 - Hungarian-born Adolph Cukor (better known as Adolph Zukor) emigrates to the United States where he becomes invested in cinema in 1903. By 1912, Cukor established Famous Players Film Company which in turn became Famous Players–Lasky and eventually Paramount Pictures. As president of Paramount, Zukor produced numerous Color Classics cartoons during the 1930s.
- 1899 - Hungarian-born Margit Winkler (better known as Margaret J. Winkler) emigrates to the United States where in 1918 she becomes the first female film producer, playing an essential role in the production of Out of the Inkwell, and the early history of Felix the Cat, Krazy Kat and Disney's Oswald the Lucky Rabbit series with the help of her husband Charles Mintz.

== Early animation efforts ==
The earliest period of Hungarian animation was marked by experimentation and the development of the first animation studio headed by pioneers, Gyula Macskássy and János Halász. Animations were primarily promotional in nature although throughout the 1930s more and more complex narrative structures were developed. Between 1932 and 1945, 150 promotional cartoons are produced including Családi kávépótló ("Family Coffee Substitute"), Estétől reggelig ("Evening to Morning"), A láthatatlan vendég ("Invisible Visitor"), Zeusz inkognitóban ("Zeus in Cognito"), Vidám suszterinas ("The hilarious shoemaker's boy"), Szerencsés flottás ("Lucky Jim"), and Izzó szerelem ("Glowing Love") During the lead-up to World War II and the turbulent war years, Hungary saw an exodus of artists and filmmakers, particularly among the Hungarian Jewish population. Seeking to continue their art in less politically fraught climates, several Hungarian cartoonists began to establish studios abroad.

- 1914 - István Kató Kiszly, creator of weekly news bulletins, creates Hungary's first animated film—an animated cut-out cartoon entitled Zrib Ödön. For the next few years he creates several more cut-out cartoons including János Vitez (1916) and the caricatures of Marcell Vértes made in 1918 for the evening news bulletin entitled "Evening" He would go on to animate Rómeó és Júlia ("Romeo and Juliet") in 1921, and Bogárorféum ("The Music Hall of Insects") in 1932.
- 1914 - Painter, Móric Gábor contracts to make and produces a short animation which is lost during World War I.
- 1920s - Hungarian Dadaist, György Gerö creates a series of experimental animations including a short film depicting a blooming cactus. He would avoid political prison during the 1940s by committing himself to an asylum as a neurotic. Here, all traces of him were lost.
- 1920 - Bohemian-born Austro-Hungarian, Berthold Bartosch emigrates to Berlin where he worked with Lotte Reininger on silhouette animation techniques before moving to Paris in 1930 to create L'Idée.
- 1922 - Hungarian-born Gyula Engel (anglicized as Jules Engel) emigrates to Chicago. He would move to Los Angeles in 1937 to work with Margit Winkler, eventually settling in Hollywood in the late 1930s working for Disney on Fantasia and Bambi and later founding UPA.
- 1922 - Andor Weininger creates the earliest surviving animated film storyboard script made by a Hungarian.
- 1924 - Hungarian-born stop-motion animator, István Rajk (Gallicized as Étienne Raïk) settles in Paris.
- 1928 - Graphic artist, Gyula Macskássy meets János Halász at Műhely, a Bauhaus art studio run by Sándor Bortnyik. Here, short experimental animations are produced under Bortnyik's direction including a piece drawn by Halász depicting a chicken walking in front of an egg—originally intended to become part of the chicken csárdás scene in Bortnyik's unreleased Királyfi és a Hattyútündér ("The Prince and the Swan Fairy"). Only a few fragments of Bortnyk's films remain today.
- 1929 - Painter, Róbert Berény joins Endre Gál's special effects atelier, Pantofilm, to produce limited animations including Az okos kandúr ("The Clever Tomcat"), and Sabol rovarirtó ("Sabol Insect Repellent").
- 1930 - Emigre artist, Győző Vásárhelyi (better known as Victor Vasarely) establishes himself in Paris where he develops his style of kinematic and kinetic art through the use of optical illusion and methods like flip animation. He is joined briefly in the early 1930s by Imre Hajdú who works together with him to paint background sets.
- 1930 - János Halász produces short interstitial animations together with György Marczincsák at studio Hunnia. These animations mostly consisted of title sequences and animated inserts to adapt foreign animations for Hungarian audiences.
- Early 1930s - Emigre artists, Lenke Perényi (better known as Madeleine Steinfield) and Vilma Kiss (variously known as Vilma de Kiss, Vilma de Kish, and Wilma de Quiche) settle in Paris to produce French animations.
- 1932 - Together with graphic artist Félix Kassowitz, Macskássy and Halász form Hungary's first animation studio, Coloriton, which existed for 4 years, producing high-quality promotion-oriented animations for television and cinema including Boldog király kincse ("The Treasure of the Joyful King"). The three men are joined by caricaturist Ernő Szénássy and musician Gusztáv Ilosvay. Toward the end of Coloriton's existence, the studio expanded briefly into the UK where the daughter studio, British Colour Cartoon Films Limited, was formed under Halász' supervision.
- 1932 - Emigre cartoonist, Imre Hajdú (better known by his stage name, Jean Image—"Image" is based upon the French pronunciation of "Im-Haj", the initial syllables of his full name) establishes himself in France to produce nearly two dozen animated films during his lifetime.
- 1933 - Imre Tóth (better known as Amerigo Tot) works on an animated adaptation of Pinocchio. The film has since been lost.
- 1934 - Emigre cartoonist, György Pál Marczincsák (better known by his stage name, George Pal) first moves to Germany where he creates Habakuk and Der Kollege while developing the concept of Puppetoons (originally called Pal-dolls). He would move shortly afterward to Holland for Philips to create Philips Cavalcade (1934) and The Sleeping Beauty (1935), and then to Paris and then Eindhoven where he founded and worked at puppet animation studio Dollywood until 1939. Establishing himself in Hollywood in 1940, Pal worked for Paramount where he produced several more shorts in the Puppetoons series and won several Oscars.
- 1934 - Artist Béla Balázs emigrates to the Soviet Union where he creates "A Vor" (Russian: Вор).
- 1936 - Cartoonist János Halász (anglicized as John Halas) emigrates to found Halas and Batchelor Studio in London with his wife, Joy Batchelor in 1940. Here he finds the political freedom to produce a number of works including his most famous work, Animal Farm (1954). He would later be granted an OBE in 1972, would become the president of ASIFA in 1979, and would play an essential role in Hungary's first three animated film festivals (KAFF events).
- Late 1930s - Hungarian animation within Hungary continues through the efforts of animators like István Balogh, Viktor Kálmán, Félix Kassowitz, and István Valker. During this period Valker famously creates Orosz álom ("Russian Dream"), Tiroli tánc ("Dance of Tyrol"), and Sztepptánc ("Step-Dance"), a series of three live action and animation pictures starring child actress, Ági Polly. Valker's techniques were developed independent of prior similar efforts abroad, but in Hungary the concept was considered unworkable, and the films met with poor reception.
- 1938-1944 - Valker creates Csavargó szerencséje ("A Vagabond's Luck") and, with the help of Teréz David, A molnár, a fia meg a szamár ("The Miller, The Miller's Son, and the Donkey"), the latter of which would be completed during the bombing campaign that preceded the 1944 Siege of Budapest.
- 1940 - László Tubay creates A kis balta ("Small Axe")
- 1946 - István Bessenyei creates Holdszerenád ("Moon-Serenade")
- 1946 - Emigre cartoonist, Péter Mihály Földes (anglicized as Peter Foldes) established himself in England where he works in collaboration with János Halász before marrying his wife Joan Foldes and establishing an independent studio. Here the couple create the politically charged A Short Vision which won critical acclaim on release in 1956. The couple live briefly in Paris before settling in Canada to produce a number of films for the National Film Board of Canada including the Oscar-nominated Hunger (1975).
- 1948 - All film-making is nationalized by the Hungarian Communist Party. During the next few years Macskássy worked independently within national channels to create a series of educational films including Az egér és az oroszlán ("The Mouse and the Lion"), Hol az a macska? ("Where's that Cat?"), and Uhuka, a kis bagoly ("Uhuka, the Little Owl"). A number of short films were released at a slow rate by other artists as well.
- 1948 - Zoltán Olcsai Kiss creates the puppet-animation, Megy a juhász a szamáron ("Shepherd's Riding a Donkey"), the first animated film following nationalization of the industry. He creates Vitamin ABC two years later in 1950.
- 1950 - Emigre cartoonist, Teréz David (anglicized as Tissa David), moves to Paris, eventually establishing herself in New York City in 1955.

== Modern animation ==
=== First generation animation ===
Folktale animation is common and this period sees a rise in Hungarian animation establishing such animators as József Nepp, Attila Dargay, Tibor Csermák, Gyorgy Kovásznai, József Gémes, Szabolcs Szabó, György Várnai, Marcell Jankovics, Péter Szoboszlay, Zsolt Richly, Sándor Reisenbüchler, Béla Vajda, Tamás Szabó Sipos, János Mata, and also puppet animators like Ottó Foky and István Imre.

- 1941-1951 - Gyula Macskássy and Edit Fekete create the first color animation, A kiskakas gyémánt félkrajcárja ("The Little Cock's Diamond Halfpenny"). The film begins life as a black and white production in the Cartoon and Puppet Department of the wartime Newsreel and Documentary Studios, but due to delays relating to the war, the film isn't completed until 1951.
- 1952 - Gyula Macskássy creates Erdei sportverseny ("Sport Competition in the Forest").
- 1953 - Gyula Macskássy and Edit Fekete create Kutyakötelesség ("A Puppy's Strict Obligation").
- 1955 - Gyula Macskássy creates Két bors ökröcske ("Two Peppercorn Steers").
- 1956 - With the help of Hungarian emigre cartoonist Richard Fehsl, cartoonists Kalman Kozelka (anglicized as Kali Kozelka) and his wife, Ida Mocsary (better known as Ducika Mocsary) flee to Austria as political refugees. They settle in the Netherlands in the 1970s founding Kozelka Film Studios.
- 1956 - Emigre cartoonist, Elek Imrédy exits the country to settle in the Canada.
- 1958 - Gyula Macskássy creates A telhetetlen méhecske ("The Greedy Bee").
- 1960 - Gyula Macskássy creates A ceruza és a radír ("Pencil and Rubber") and Párbaj ("Duel") which are the first Hungarian films to receive international acclaim. Párbaj is awarded the Special Jury Prize at the 1961 Cannes Film Festival.

=== Second-generation animation ===
Foreign animation teams begin to reach out to Pannónia Film Studio as a way to cut costs on some of the more labor-intensive aspects of cartoon production. In domestic productions, however, with the artistic community under strain from an authoritarian Communist government, morbidity and black humor become more common as cartoons were used to hint at and reflect the philosophy and conditions of the day. Due to Western influence, such cartoon serials emerged as Gyula Macskássy and György Várnai's Peti és a gépember ("Peti and the Robot"), Marci és a Cső ("Marci in the Jungle"), Vili és Bütyök ("Vili and Bütyök"), Üzenet a jövőből ("Messages from the Future"), Kérem a következőt! ("Next, Please!"), Varjúdombi mesék ("Tales from Crow Hill"), Tamás Szabó Sipos's Magyarázom... ("Let Me Explain..."), and Ottó Foky's Egy világhírű vadász emlékiratai ("The Magic Snake"). With the emergence of cartoon serials came the country's first recognizable cartoon character stars such as Gergő, Peti, Gustav, Frakk, Kukori and Kotkoda, Mirr-Murr, Elek Mekk, Dr. Bubó, Mikrobi, Kockásfülű nyúl, TV Maci, and Mézga család, each of whom featured in several cartoons. Animation for adult entertainment also emerged during this period with such series as Gyula Macskássy and György Várnai's Ember és ember ("Man and Human").

- 1961 – József Nepp creates Szenvedély ("Passion").
- 1961 – Tibor Csermák creates A piros pöttyös labda ("The Ball with White Dots"), which wins the 1961 Venice Film Festival Golden Lion for best Children's Film.
- 1961 – Under Gyula Macskássy's leadership, work is completed for the Western film series, Arthur (itself directed by emigre Zoran Janjic).
- 1962 – Inspired by their work on Arthur, Gyula Macskássy and György Várnai create Peti és a gépember ("Peti and the Robot"), the first cartoon in what was to become the Peti series (26 episodes, 1963–1967). This marks Hungary's first animated series.
- 1963 – Gyorgy Kovásznai creates Monológ ("Monologue") which pushes the visual artistry of the medium.
- 1964 – Gyorgy Kovásznai creates Átváltozások ("Metamorphoses") which pushes the visual artistry of the medium.
- 1964 – Ottó Foky creates TV Maci ("TV Little Bear"). Inspired by the puppet-animations of Czech director Jiří Trnka, the popular TV Maci becomes the mascot of the Hungarian children's TV program Esti mese ("Bed Time Story").
- 1966 - József Nepp creates Öt perc gyilkosság ("Murder For Five Minutes")
- 1966 - Gyula Macskássy and György Várnai create Tíz deka halhatatlanság ("Ten Dekagrams of Immortality")
- 1967 - Gyorgy Kovásznai creates Hamlet, which pushes the visual artistry of the medium.
- 1968 - József Gémes creates Koncertisszimo ("Concertissimo"), one of the first animated paintings.
- 1968 - Sándor Reisenbüchler creates A Nap és a Hold elrablása ("Sun and Moon Carried Off"), which is considered to expand the narrative sophistication of the medium while introducing experimental collage techniques.
- 1969 - Marcell Jankovics creates Hídavatás ("A Ceremonial Opening of a Bridge")
- 1970 - Gyula Macskássy creates Az öngyilkos ("Self-Destroyer")
- 1971 - József Gémes creates Temetés ("Funeral")

=== Third generation animation ===
With the artistic community still under government pressure, a third generation of films is marked by a muted subsurface emphasis on anxiety and a claustrophobic fear of persecution. Older (first and second generation) animators tended to emphasize morality and a development of the grotesque.

- 1970-1971 - Marcell Jankovics creates Mással beszélnek ("The Line is Engaged").
- 1970 - The first feature-length cartoon script is created with the title Gusztáv bárkája ("Gustav's Boat") however the film is never produced.
- 1971 - The animation workshop, Kecskeméti Animációs Filmstúdió, is founded as a subsidiary of Pannónia Film Studio. Shortly after this, another workshop would be established in Pécs.
- 1972 - Sándor Reisenbüchler creates Az 1812-es év ("The Year 1812") to win a Palme d'Or du court métrage in Cannes. He would go on to create Holdmese ("Moon-Flight") in 1975, and Pánik ("Panic") in 1978.
- 1973 - Béla Vajda creates Jócselekedetek ("Good-Deeds")
- 1973 - György Kovásznai creates Ca Ira ("It Will Work"). He would go on to create the feature-length musical cartoon, Habfürdő ("Foam Bath") in 1979.
- 1973 - Kati Macskássy greatly develops the genre of children's animation with Gombnyomásra ("Push Button") and later Nekem az élet teccik nagyon... ("I Think Life's Great Fun") in 1976. The latter film won 1st Prize at Melbourne.
- 1973 - Marcell Jankovics creates the first feature-length Hungarian film, János Vitéz ("Johnny Corncob") based on the poetry of Sándor Petőfi. He would go on to create the 1975 Academy Award nominee, Sisyphus, and later Küzdők (Fight) which won a Palme d'Or du court métrage in Cannes. These efforts were followed by the Magyar népmesék ("Hungarian Folk Tales") series in 1978.
- 1973 - Bill Feigenbaum and József Gémes create the feature-length Hugó a víziló ("Hugo, the Hippopotamus") under the commission of American Fabergé Brut.
- 1975 - Ottó Foky creates Babfilm ("Scenes With Beans") to win the Grand Prix at the Lausanne Film Festival.
- 1975 - Emigre cartoonist Gábor Csupó moves to Sweden to escape the oppressive conditions of Soviet-era Hungary. He soon forms Klasky Csupo Studio with his wife, the Hungarian-born animator Arlene Klasky. The couple would go on to produce shows such as The Simpsons and Rugrats, and would win numerous Emmy awards for their efforts in animation.
- 1976 - Péter Szoboszlay creates Hé, te! ("Hey, You")
- 1976 - Ferenc Varsányi creates Nagy mulatság ("The Big Blow-Out"). He would later help to further develop the genre of children's animation with Irka-firka ("Graffiti") in 1977.
- 1976 - Attila Dargay creates the feature-length Lúdas Matyi ("Matty the Gooseboy")
- 1977 - István Kovács creates Változó idők ("Changing Times")
- 1977 - Csaba Szórady creates Rondinó ("Rondino")
- 1978 - Pál Varga Géza creates Fair Play

=== The 1980s ===
A decade considered to have been responsible for the peak of Hungarian animation, the 1980s would see increasingly bold use of irony and allegory in portraying the Hungarian condition under Communist rule and would mark a renaissance in technical experimentation with the exploration of many non-traditional graphic media. Of particular note, several new experimental serials emerged during this period including Sándor Békési's Vázák meséi ("Tales of Vases"), Csaba Varga's Szekrénymesék ("The Wardrobe's Tales"), and plasticine animations including Csaba Varga's Auguszta ("Augusta") and Ferenc Cakó's Zénó. Feature-length films were made of a number of serials from the 1960s and 1970s, including Szabolcs Szabó and József Haui's Vízipók-csodapók ("Water-Spider, Wonder-Spider"), Ottó Foky's Misi Mókus kalandjai ("The Adventures of Sam the Squirrel"), Attila Dargay's Vuk, and Pál Tóth's Leo és Fred ("Leo and Fred"). New series were also launched including Attila Dargay's Pom-pom meséi ("Tales of Pom Pom") and A nagy hó-hó-horgász ("The Grrreat Angler"), Ferenc Cakó's Sebaj Tóbiás ("Never Mind Toby"), László Ujváry Jr.'s Mesék Mátyás királyról ("Tales about King Matthias"), Marcell Jankovics' Mondák a magyar történelemből ("Hungarian Historical Legends"), Zsolt Richly's Fabulák ("Fables") and Kíváncsi Fáncsi ("Curious Fáncsi"), Tibor Hernádi's Animália ("Animalia"), Líviusz Gyulai's Tinti kalandjai ("Tinti's Adventures") and Kentaurfi kalandjai ("Adventures of Fanny the Elephant"), Tamás Baksa's Trombi és a tűzmanó ("Trombi and the Fiery Imp"), and Ferenc Varsányi's Csepke ("Droplet"). Animators making a name for themselves in this period included Ferenc Varsányi, Miklós Kaim, István Kovács, Elek Lisziák, Zsolt Richly, Kati Macskássy, Béla Ternovszky, Tibor Hernádi, László Ujváry, Ferenc Cakó, László Hegyi Füstös, Csaba Varga, Ágnes Pásztor, Mária Horváth, István Orosz, and Ferenc Rofusz.

- 1980 - Csaba Varga creates Ebéd ("The Luncheon"), the first in a series starring Augusztá the rubber lady. He would go on to create the artistically significant A szél ("The Wind") in 1985.
- 1980 - Béla Vajda creates Moto Perpetuo to win the Palme d'Or du court métrage at the Cannes Film Festival. He goes on to create the social message film, Teljesítmény és siker ("Performance and Success") in 1982.
- 1980 - Mária Horváth creates Ajtó ("Doors") and later the artistically significant Az éjszaka csodái ("Miracles of the Night") in 1982.
- 1980 - Marcell Jankovics creates the experimental feature-length film, Fehérlófia ("The Son of the White Horse")
- 1981 - Third generation cartoonist, Ferenc Rofusz creates A Légy ("The Fly"), a darkly allegorical tale about loss of freedom and the consequences of desperate attempts to escape. The film is well-received internationally and it wins the 1981 Academy Award for best animated short film. Rofusz would go on to create Gravitáció ("Gravitation") in 1984 before emigrating to Toronto to work at Nelvana Studios in 1988.
- 1981 - János Kass' Dilemma becomes the first fully digital animated film and is nominated for a Palme d'Or du court métrage for Best Short Film at the Cannes Film Festival.
- 1982 - Ferenc Cakó creates Autótortúra ("Motorture") and, later the same year, Ad Astra.
- 1982 - Miklós Kaim creates Kutyagumi ("Mad Rubber Dog")
- 1982 - László Hegyi Füstös creates Statisztikai zsebfilm ("Statistical Pocketfilm"), a social message film
- 1982 - György Kovásznai and Elek Lisziák create Riportré ("Reportrait"), a social message film
- 1982 - Ottó Foky releases Misi Mókus kalandjai ("The Adventures of Sam the Squirrel")
- 1982 - József Gémes creates the experimental feature-length film, Daliás idők ("Heroic Times"). This would be followed by Vili, a veréb ("Willy the Sparrow") in 1988.
- 1982 - Pannónia Film Studio produces the French film, Les Maîtres du temps by director René Laloux
- 1983 - Atilla Csáji creates the experimental laser animation, A hatodik vagy a hetedik ("Sixth or Seventh...")
- 1983 - Annamária Zoltán creates the experimental textile animation, Rhapsody in Blue Jeans
- 1983 - József Nepp creates the experimental feature-length film, Hófehér ("No-White")
- 1983 - Zsolt Richly creates Háry János
- 1984 - Gyula Nagy creates Süti ("Scones"), followed soon afterward by the 1986 experimental film, Ujjhullám ("Finger Wave").
- 1984 - István Orosz creates the social message film, Ah, Amerika! ("Ah, America!"), for which he would win the 1985 KAFF Award for Best Script. He would go on to win KAFF awards in 1993 and 2005 when he was awarded the Grand Prix for Az idõ látképei ("Time Sights").
- 1984 - Atilla Dargay creates the feature-length Szaffi ("Saffi")
- 1985 - The first tri-annual Kecskemét Animation Film Festival (Kecskeméti Animáció FilmFesztivál, or KAFF) is held in Kecskemét, Hungary.
- 1986 - Béla Ternovszky creates the feature-length Macskafogó ("Cat City")
- 1987 - Béla Weisz creates Ajtó l ("Door I")
- 1987 - Sándor Reisenbüchler creates Isten veled kis sziget ("Farewell Little Island"), which pushes animation's visual artistry.
- 1987 - Ferenc Cakó creates a series of experimental animations starting with the sand animation, Ab ovo, which won the Palme d'Or du court métrage for Animation at the Cannes Film Festival. This was followed by the 1989 experimental plasticine and coal powder animation, Ad rém ("Ad rem")
- 1988 - The second Kecskemét Animation Film Festival is held with notable animators such as John Halas serving on the selection jury. Organization problems delay the third such festival until 1993 and the festival resumes in 1996 when it was broadened to include international participants in the concurrently run Festival of European Animated Feature Films and TV-Specials (Európai Animációs Játékfilm Fesztival).
- 1989 - Zoltán Szilágyi Varga creates Ajtó 3 ("Door 3")
- 1989 - Jánvári creates the experimental computer-animated Labiritmus ("Labirythm")

=== Current animation industry ===
The end of the century saw the end of Communism in Hungary. Although state support for Hungary's one animation studio (Pannónia Film Stúdió) came to an end, the free market quickly prompted the development of a number of independent animation studios. In order to gain funding in the absence of the state, studios such as Kecskemétfilm Kft turn to employee ownership strategies while other studios work primarily as contractors for foreign markets doing work such as compositioning and inking. Yet other studios such as the American-Hungarian joint venture Studio 2 have focused instead on traditional hand-drawn cell animation techniques to preserve this now niche animation style. Among other animation studios that were founded since the withdrawal of state control are included Pannónia rajzfilmgyártók, Videovox, Funny Film, Animex, Dana Film, Reflex, Puppet Film, Aladin stúdió, Firka, and the German-Hungarian joint venture Loonland. Several feature-length films have been released since the late 1980s including Albert mondja... ("Albert Says...") and Majmok kastélya ("Monkey Castle") among others. Animators who have risen to prominence since the end of the Communist era include Péter Szoboszlay, László Hegyi Füstös, Mária Horváth, Líviusz Gyulai, István Orosz, Dóra Keresztes, László Haris, Péter Molnár, Zoltán Szilágyi Varga, Árpád Miklós, Gizella Neuberger, Béla Weisz, and László Ujváry.

- 1988 - Independent animation studio, Varga Studio, first begins to form from Egyetemi Színpadon's 1974 amateur animation collective, IXILON, under the efforts of Csaba Varga as government policies relax and the Communist era draws to a close.
- 1990 - State support for Pannónia Film Stúdió ends.
- 1991 - József Gémes creates the feature-length Hercegnő és a kobold ("The Princess and the Goblin") with a now-independent Pannónia Film Stúdió.
- 1991 - Pannónia Film Studio subsidiary, Kecskeméti Animációs Filmstúdió becomes an independent entity eventually taking the name Kecskemétfilm Kft under the leadership of Ferenc Mikulás.
- 1992 - Independent studio, Magyar Rajzfilm is formed.
- 1993 - Two Kecskemétfilm animations are shortlisted for Cartoon d'or consideration: Zoltán Szilágyi Varga's Éjszakai kultúrtörténeti hadgyakorlat ("Cultural Historical Manœuvre at Night") and Mária Horváth's Zöldfa utca 66 ("66, Zöldfa Street") respectively.
- 1996 - Kecskemétfilm releases Rege a csodaszarvasról ("Tale of the Miraculous Hind")
- 1996 - Marcell Iványi creates Szél ("Wind"), winning a Palme d'Or du court métrage in Cannes.
- 1998 - Studio 2 releases Zoltán Szilágyi Varga's Egérút ("Mouse Journey"), a feature-length film that was marketed internationally but which met with poor reception.
- 2001 - 3D CGI-animation studio, Digic Pictures is founded to produce independent animations as well as animation for the video game industry.
- 2002 - Pannónia Film Studio releases Marcell Jankovics's Csodaszarvas ("The Miraculous Hind") with funding from the Ministry of National Cultural Heritage.
- 2002 - Ági Mészáros creates Eső Után ("After Rain"), winning the Palme d'Or for Short Film at the 2002 Cannes Film Festival.
- 2004 - Varga Studio releases Csudafa ("Wonder Tree") under the direction of Péter Halász
- 2004 - Áron Gauder and Erik Novák create Nyócker! ("The District!")
- 2007 - Ádám Magyar creates the first freely downloadable 3D computer-animated feature-film, Egon & Dönci
- 2007 - Géza M. Tóth creates the Oscar-nominated 3D animation, Maestro.
- 2008 - György Gát directs the Kis Vuk ("Little Fox"); the sequel of the Vuk which was based on A Kis vuk és a Simabőrüek. It failed at the movie theaters, due to the lack of graphic, and the incoherent story.
- 2009 - Rudolf Pap creates a music video for Kylie Minogue's Speakerphone.
- 2011 - Magyar Rajzfilm releases Az ember tragédiája ("The Tragedy of Man"), based on Imre Madách's magnum opus.

== See also ==
- Pannónia Filmstúdió (from hu.Wikipedia) - Discussion of the history of Hungarian animation
- A rajzfilm Magyarországon (from hu.Wikipedia) - Discussion of Hungarian animation in the general Animation article
- A magyar rajzfilmgyártás filmjei (from hu.Wikipedia) - List of Hungarian animated films
