= Ptolemy Pindarion =

Ptolemy of Alexandria (Ancient Greek: Πτολεμαῖος Ἀλεξανδρεύς), son of Oroandes, was an ancient Greek grammarian, nicknamed Pindarion (Πινδαρίων). He was a pupil of Aristarchus of Samothrace.

The Suda records the following works by him, now all lost: Illustrations of Homer (in three books) (Ὁμηρικῶν ὑποδειγμάτων), On the Stylistic Character of Homer (Περὶ τοῦ Ὁμηρικοῦ χαρακτῆρος), To Neothalides On Diction (Πρὸς Νεοθαλίδην περὶ λέξεως), On the word Outis in Homer (Περὶ τοῦ παρ' Ὁμήρῳ Οὔτιδος), and On Asteropaeus in Homer (Περὶ Ἀστεροπαίου τοῦ παρ' Ὁμήρῳ μνημονευομένου), among others.
