= Outis =

Greek pseudonym, literally "no one"

Outis (a transliteration of the Ancient Greek pronoun Οὔτις, meaning "nobody" or "no one") is an often used pseudonym that appeared famously in Classical Greek legends. Modern artists, writers, and others in public life have adopted the use of this pseudonym in order to hide their identity and it has been used for fictional characters as well.

== Ancient Greek origin of the pseudonym ==
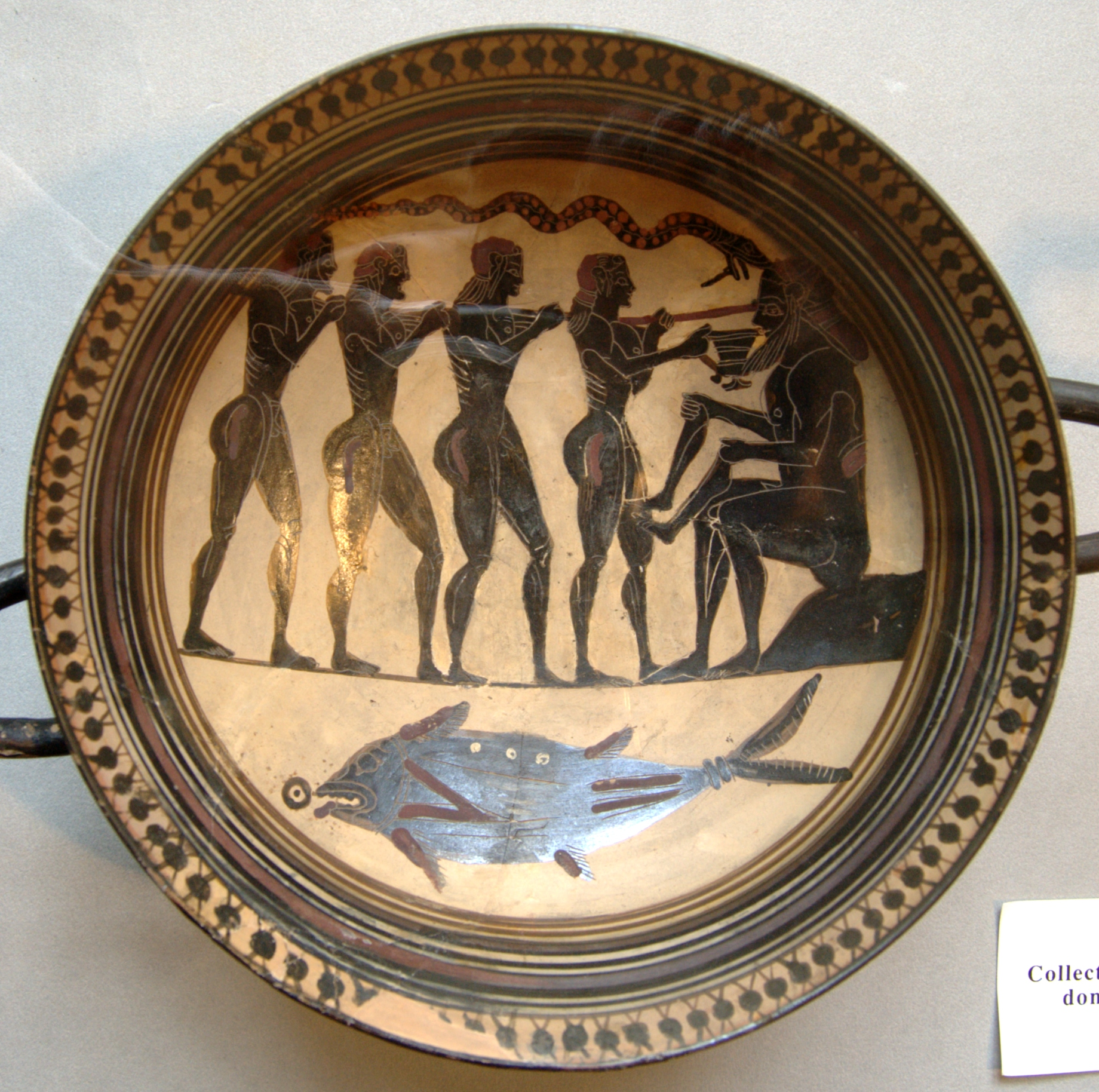
Blinding of the Cyclops

The Homeric hero Odysseus used the pseudonym "Outis" when he was fighting the Cyclops Polyphemus and the monster demanded his name. Odysseus replied instead that the pronoun was his name in order to trick the monster. After Odysseus had put out the monster's eye, Polyphemus shouted in pain to the other Cyclopes of the island. When they shouted back, inquiring whether Polyphemus was in danger, he replied that "Nobody" was trying to kill him, so presuming that he was not in any danger, none of them came to his rescue. The story of the Cyclops can be found in the Odyssey, book 9 (in the Cyclopeia).

Use of the name "Nobody" can be found in five different lines of Book 9.

First of all in line 366:

"Cyclops, you asked my noble name, and I will tell it; but do you give the stranger's gift, just as you promised. My name is Nobody. Nobody I am called by mother, father, and by all my comrades."

Then in line 369:

So I spoke, and from a ruthless heart he straightway answered: "Nobody I eat up last, after his comrades; all the rest first; and that shall be the stranger's gift for you."

Then in line 408:

Then in his turn from out the cave big Polyphemus answered: "Friends, Nobody is murdering me by craft. Force there is none." But answering him in winged words they said: "If nobody harms you when you are left alone, illness which comes from mighty Zeus you cannot fly. But make your prayer to your father, lord Poseidon".

In line 455:

"Are you sorry because that wicked Nobody brought your master down with drink and blinded him?".

And in line 460:

"I should thus have some revenge for the harm that no-good Nobody has done me".

== Ptolemaeus Chennos ==
According to the account preserved by Photios I of Constantinople from Ptolemaeus Chennos, Odysseus was originally called Outis (Οὖτις) because of his large ears. The explanation is based on a play on words: οὖς means "ear", while ὠτίς denotes a bustard with long ears. While his mother was pregnant, she fell beside the road during a heavy rainstorm and, for this reason, he was given the name Odysseus. The name is connected with the words ὁδός ("road") and ὗσεν ("it rained").

== Ptolemy of Alexandria, son of Oroandes ==
The Suda states that Ptolemy of Alexandria, son of Oroandes, an ancient Greek grammarian nicknamed Pindarion, wrote a work entitled On the Word Outis in Homer (Περὶ τοῦ παρ’ Ὁμήρῳ Οὔτιδος), which is now lost.

== Uses of the pseudonym Outis ==
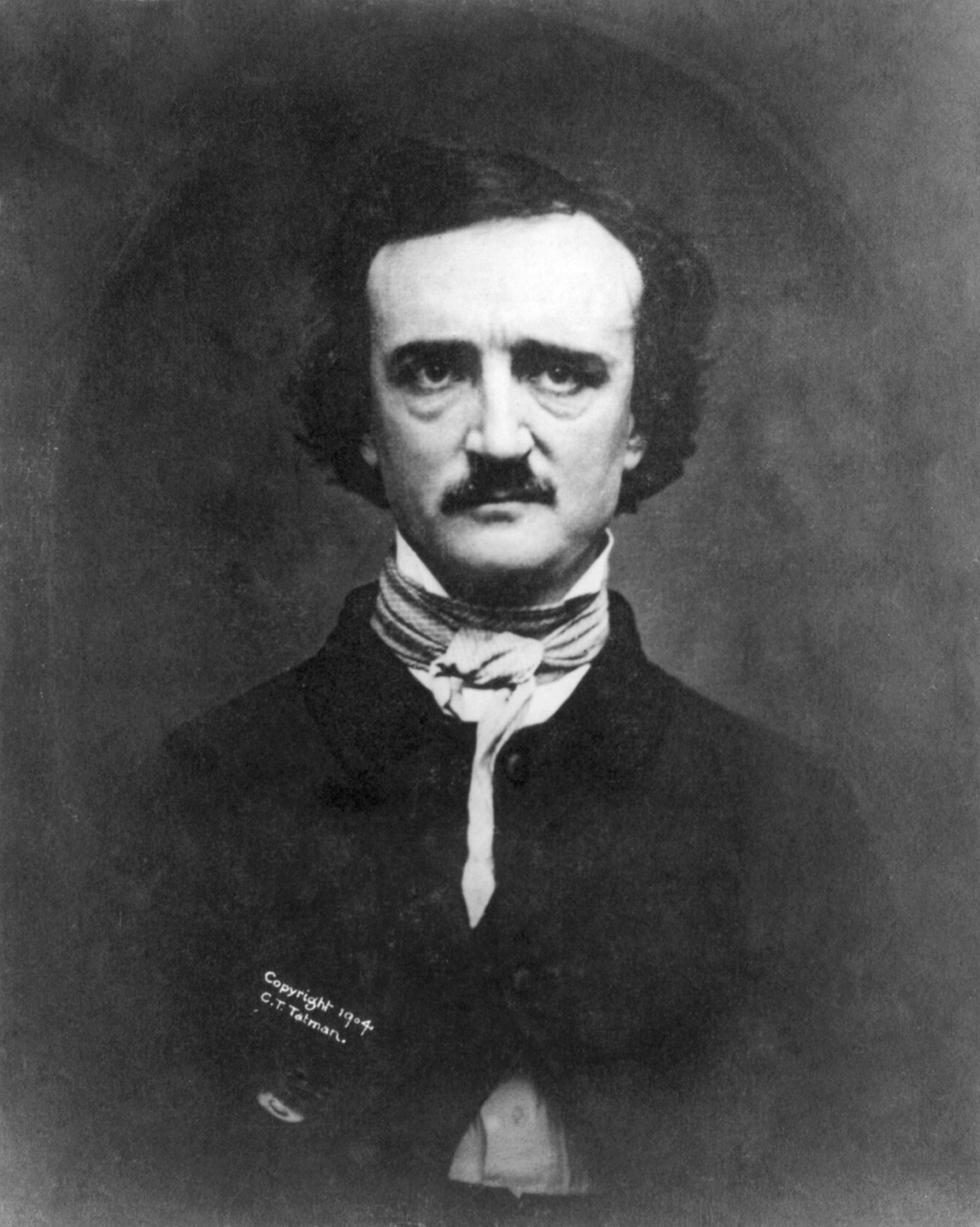
Edgar Allan Poe

- In the New York Evening Mirror (January 14, 1845), Edgar Allan Poe denounced the poet Henry Wadsworth Longfellow as a plagiarist. Longfellow remained silent on the matter, but a defender for Longfellow did appear, an anonymous writer who signed his letters only as "Outis". Speculation as to the identity of Outis has mentioned Cornelius Felton, Lawrence Labree, and Poe himself.
- Henry Stevens was an American rare book dealer and a graduate of Yale University. In 1845 he went to London 'on a book-hunting expedition' and remained there until his death in 1886. As an antiquarian he helped to build up several great American libraries. In 1877, under the pseudonym of 'Mr. Secretary Outis', he projected and initiated a literary association named, The Hercules Club.
- István Orosz (1951-), Hungarian visual artist, adopted the use of the pseudonym Utisz, a phonemic respelling of the Greek Outis: that is, both are pronounced /utis/. The hidden meaning of the ancient tale is very close to the visual pitfalls created by Orosz. In his work he employs visual paradox, double meaning images, and optical illusions – all of them are some kind of attack upon the eye, as a symbolic gesture to Odysseus.
  Orosz doubles even himself: from time to time, he signs his works as Utisz, the pseudonym borrowed from Cyclopeia. The most artful Greek, Odysseus, also used as a pseudonym the word meaning No-man, and as we know, with that exchange of names, then Polyphemos the Cyclops’ eye came into the world. The gouging out of the eye, or deception to the eye, also accompanied the works of Orosz/Utisz, if only metaphorically. Trompe-l'œil – we refer with an art historical expression to those images in which illusion guides the gaze. Orosz often uses such artifice, though he is completely aware of the danger of these deceptive procedures. He put it this way at a symposium a few years back: I hope my intentions are clear, in the ambitions of a Hungarian artist at the turn of the century, who does not tell the truth only to be caught in the act. (Introduction by Guy d'Obonner)
- "Outis" is the pseudonym of Henri Antoine Meilheurat des Pruraux for O il cattolicismo o la morte in Leonardo nr 7 (29 March 1903).
- "Kaniel Outis" is the pseudonym used by the protagonist, Michael Scoffield, in the fifth season of the television series Prison Break. This is one of the story's parallels with the Odyssey; others including the protagonist's imprisonment in the fictional Ogygia prison (named after Ogygia, in which Odysseus was imprisoned by the nymph Calypso), the main antagonist's code name being Poseidon, and the protagonist's struggle to return home to his wife, who lives in Ithaca, New York.
- Outis is the name of one of the twelve playable sinners in the 2023 video game Limbus Company, directly inspired by Odysseus from the Odyssey. Whether it is her true name or an alias remains to be seen.

== Other "Nobody" pseudonyms ==
- Captain Nemo, a character from the works of Jules Verne, goes by the Latin form.
- My Name is Nobody (Il mio nome è Nessuno, also known as Lonesome Gun) is a 1973 Spaghetti Western comedy film, directed by Tonino Valerii and Sergio Leone.
- A Native American character in the Western film Dead Man calls himself "Nobody".
- No One is a nu metal music group from Chicago, Illinois. The original name of the four-piece band was Black Talon. They have been active since 1994.
- Harold Cohen (1854-1927), an American author, wrote science fiction novels under the pseudonyms "Harry Enton" and "Noname". After some titles his well-known series Frank Reade was continued by Luis Senarens (1865–1939) who used "Noname" as well.
- In Doctor Who, The Doctor's anonymity is influenced by the anonymous Time Traveler in the novel The Time Machine by H. G. Wells.
- "Nobody" is a costumed vigilante seen in both the Teenage Mutant Ninja Turtles comics by Mirage Studios and IDW Publishing, as well as the 2003 animated series.
- In the Terra Ignota tetralogy by Ada Palmer, "Outis" is the nickname given by Achilles to the narrator of the fourth book, Perhaps the Stars. In the first three books, Outis is a hidden friend and follower of main character and narrator, Mycroft Canner, who occasionally alludes to 'having no one beside him'.
- The rapper and poet Fatimah Nyeema Warner is known professionally under the stage name Noname.

== See also ==
- Alan Smithee
- Luciano Berio (composer of Outis, a musical action in two parts)
- István Orosz
- My Own Self
- Nemo (name)
