= Koller Gallery =

Art gallery and auction house in Budapest, Hungary

Koller Gallery and Auction House
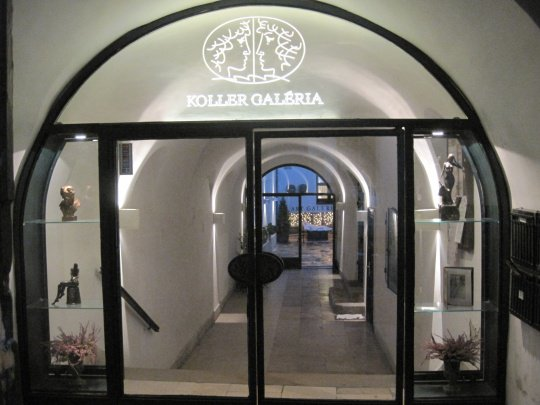
- Entrance of the Koller Gallery, Budapest
- Established: 1953
- Location: Budapest, Hungary
- Coordinates: 47.503536°N 19.032522°E
- Type: Art gallery and auction house
- Website: Official website

The Koller Gallery and Auction House is a private art gallery and auction house located in the Castle District of Budapest, Hungary. Founded in 1953, it is the longest continuously operating private gallery in the country. Since 2021, the gallery has also organized auctions and operates as an auction house.

The gallery’s exhibition spaces extend over several floors, and the top floor houses a memorial room dedicated to the Hungarian-Italian sculptor Amerigo Tot.

== History ==
The gallery was founded by the gallerist György Koller (1923–1996), who established the Association of Hungarian Engravers (RMAK) in 1953.

In 1980, the gallery opened exhibition spaces in the former atelier-house of Amerigo Tot in the Buda Castle District.

In 1984, the gallery established a showroom and sales space in the Hungarian National Gallery, strengthening cooperation with public cultural institutions.

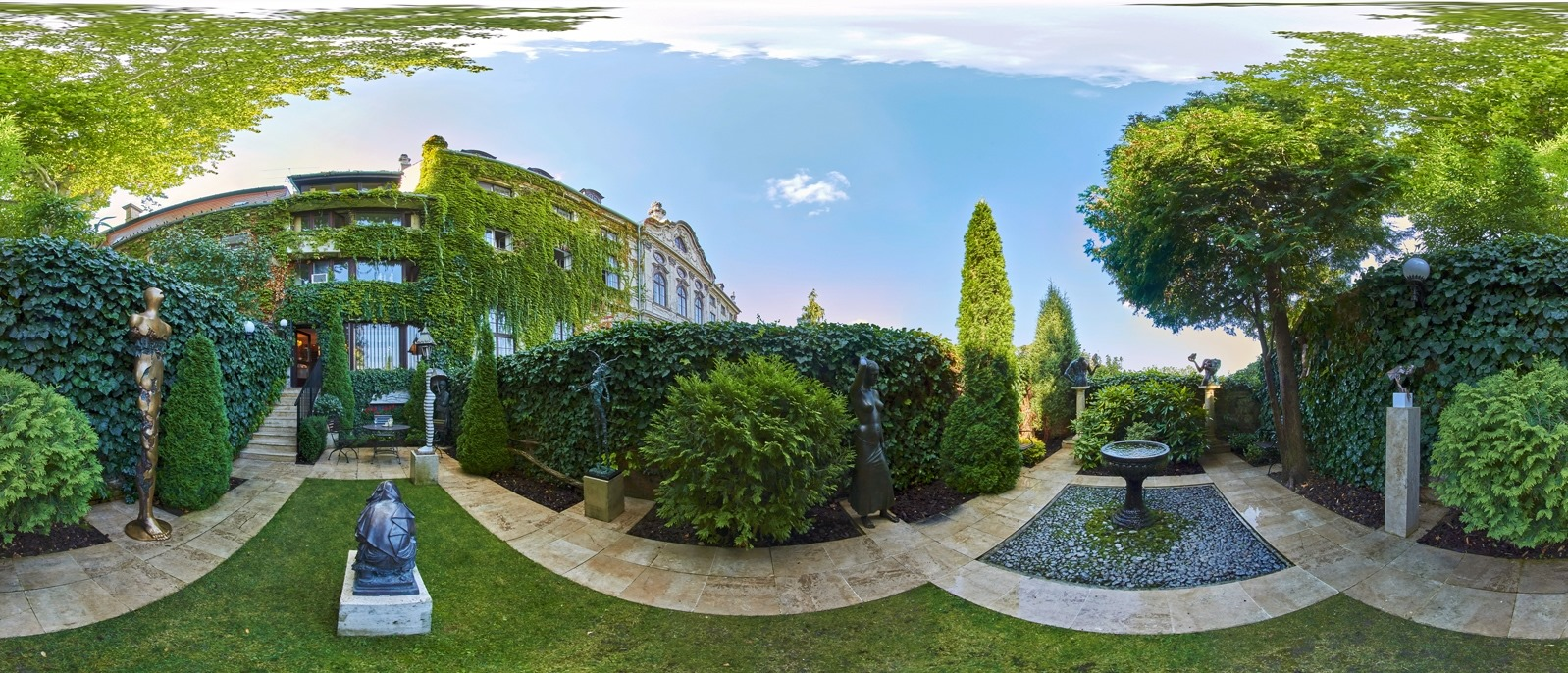
Sculpture garden of the gallery

Over the decades, the gallery has organized exhibitions and contributed to the international presentation of Hungarian artists.

Artists exhibited by the gallery have included Amerigo Tot, Jenő Barcsay, Miklós Borsos, Lajos Szalay, János Kass, Imre Varga and Miklós Melocco.

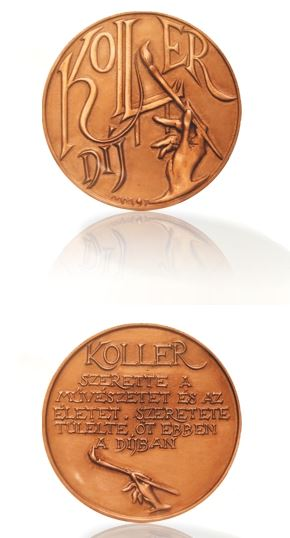
Koller Prize

Since 1997, the Koller Prize, founded by Soós Szabó Edith, has been awarded annually to contemporary artists.

After the death of György Koller in 1996, the gallery remained under family management; in 2006, his grandson took over its leadership.

== Activities ==
The gallery focuses on modern and contemporary Hungarian art. In addition to organizing exhibitions, its activities include art dealing, art appraisal, and advisory services for collectors. Since 2021, the gallery has also organized auctions.

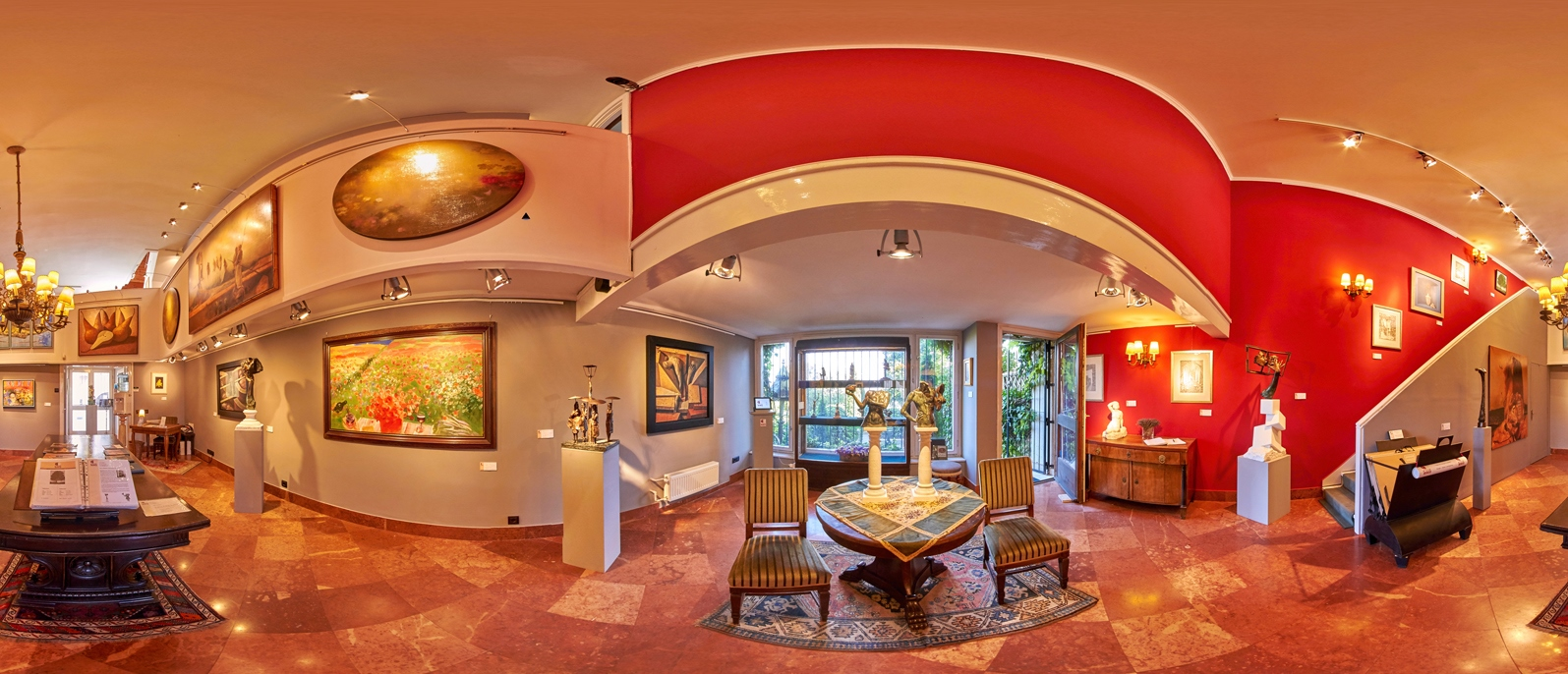
Main exhibition space

== Building and location ==
The gallery is situated in the historic Buda Castle District, one of the main cultural areas of Budapest.

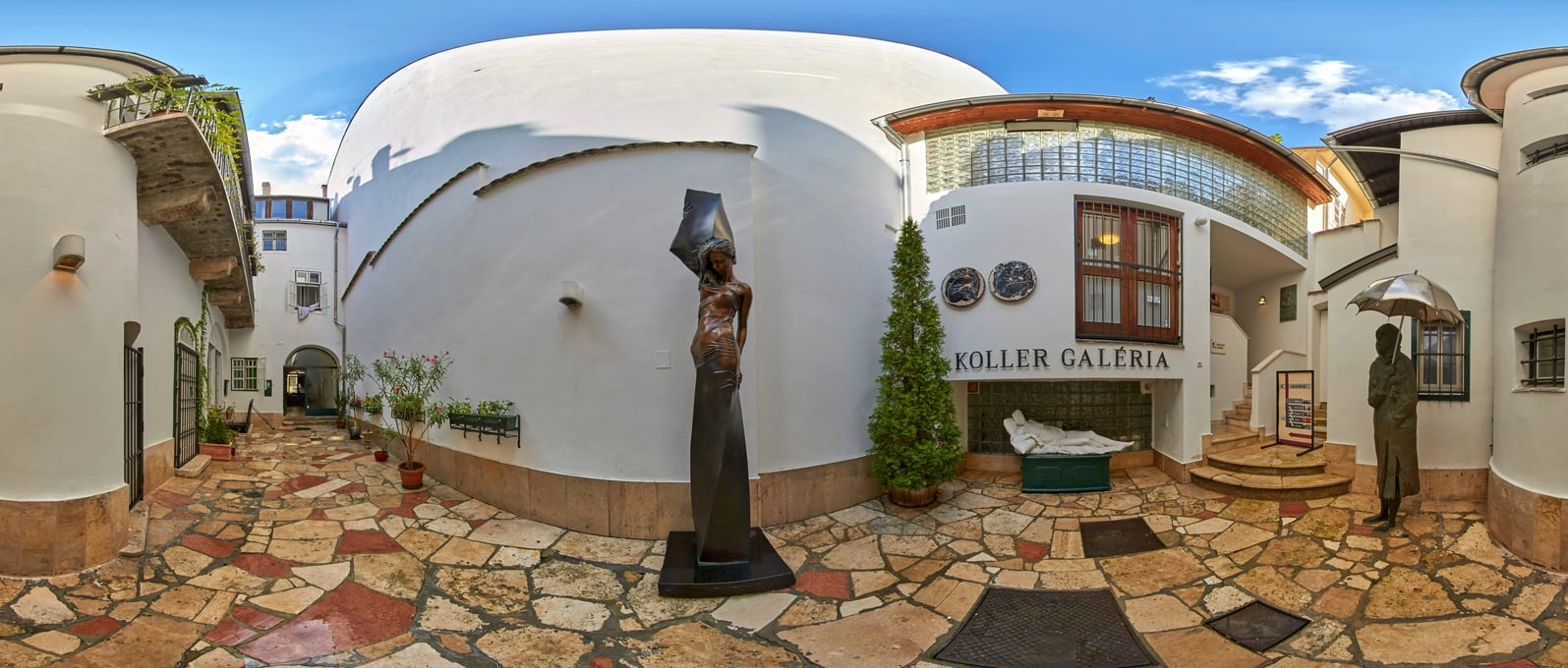
Inner courtyard of the gallery

The building previously served as the atelier-house of Amerigo Tot and remains closely associated with his work.

== Amerigo Tot memorial room ==
The upper floor of the gallery contains a memorial room dedicated to Amerigo Tot, presenting elements of his life and artistic legacy.

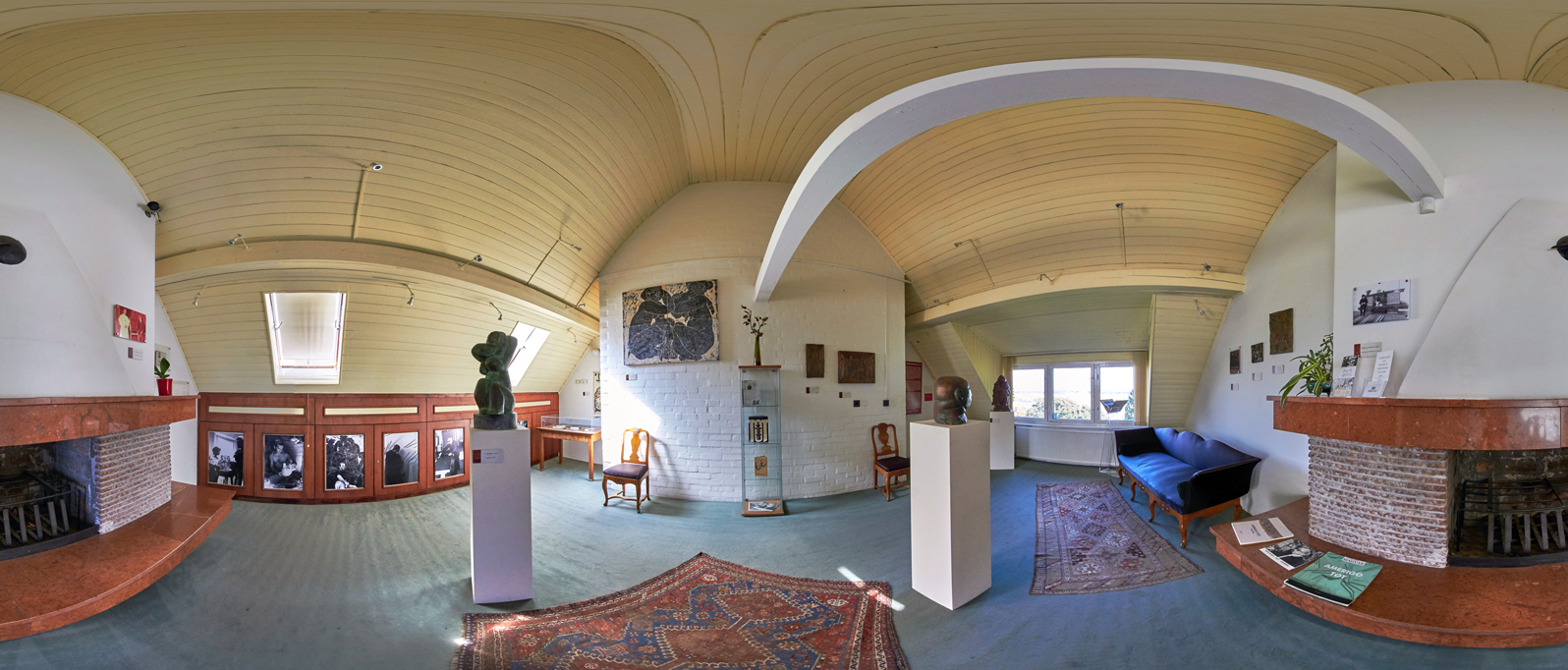
Amerigo Tot memorial room
