= Nemo (name) =

- Gender: Neutral

Origin
- Origin: Via Latin Nemo
- Meaning: "No one, nobody"

Nemo is a given name, nickname and surname. It is Latin for "nobody", and may refer to the Outis alias that Odysseus used to trick Polyphemus in The Odyssey.

It can also be used as a nickname for the given name Geronimo.

== People ==
=== Given name or nickname ===
- Nemo Gaines (1897–1979), American Major League Baseball player and naval captain
- Nemo Leibold (1892–1977), American Major League Baseball player, named after the comic strip character Little Nemo
- Nemo Mettler (born 1999), known mononymously as Nemo, Swiss rapper
- Antti Niemi (ice hockey) (born 1983), Finnish former National Hockey League goaltender nicknamed "Nemo"
- Nemo Zhou (born 2000), Chinese-born Canadian chess player and streamer; original Chinese name Qiyu Zhou

=== Last name ===
- Gina Nemo (born 1965), American actress
- Henry Nemo (1909–1999), American musician, songwriter and actor
- Louis-Paul Némo (1900–1978), known as Roparz Hemon, Breton author and scholar

== Fictional characters ==
- Captain Nemo, in Jules Verne's novels Twenty Thousand Leagues Under the Sea and Mysterious Island (1870), and adaptations thereof
- Little Nemo, protagonist of the comic strip Little Nemo in Slumberland by Winsor McCay (1905) and the main character in the 2022 film adapted from the comic strip
- Nemo, the titular clownfish main character in the 2003 Disney/Pixar animated film Finding Nemo
- Nemo, a minor character in the Charles Dickens novel Bleak House (1852)
- Nemo Nobody, the title character of the film Mr. Nobody (2009)
- Quentin Nemo, a warlock from the novel Orphans of Chaos (2005)
- Judge Nemo, main villain of the video game Disgaea 4
- Nicolas Monroe "Nemo" Makalintal, a minor character in the 2018 Philippine romantic-comedy series The One That Got Away
- NEMO, the player character of the video game Ace Combat 3: Electrosphere
- Nemo, a character in the video game Library of Ruina
