= Elektrolytes =

American dance group

- Origin: Gilbert, Arizona
- Genres: Hip-hop, popping, bboy
- Years active: 2006–2015
- Past members: Sal "Swerve" Banuelos; Nico Banuelos; Joey "Slimfly" Arevalo; Kyle "Harry Larry" James Price; George "Slideshow" Jones; Ben Barnett; Chris Thomas; Marcus "TK" Jones; Spencer Christian; Dominic Larovere; Max Thompson; Phoenix Banuelos

The Elektrolytes is an all-male dance crew formed by a group of local dancers within the area of Gilbert, Arizona in 2006. They are the winner of the seventh season of America's Best Dance Crew. They are also the winners of Hip Hop International USA 2011 Adult Division, and finished seventh in the World Hip Hop International 2011 Finals.

== History ==
Before forming Elektrolytes, they were all friends in school and years later they decided to make a dance crew naming themselves Elektrolytes as dance fuels their body and it's what plants crave. The crew auditioned for America's Best Dance Crew three times, failing to pass each time. After placing first at HHI 2011 USA for the Adult Division, the crew decided to audition for ABDC and passed.

== ABDC 7 ==
Elektrolytes were declared ABDC Champions on the Live Finale on June 13, 2012.

Week	Challenge	Music	Result
2: Flo Rida Challenge	None	"Club Can't Handle Me"; Flo Rida feat. David Guetta	Safe
3: Madonna Challenge	Must Krump in their Routine	"Hung Up"; Madonna	Safe
4: Drake Challenge	Create the Illusion that someone is Floating	"Headlines"; Drake	Safe
5: Jennifer Lopez Challenge	Create a Subway and use Canes in their Routine	"Get Right"; Jennifer Lopez	Safe
6: Pitbull Challenge	Capoeira	"I Know You Want Me"; Pitbull	Safe
7: Rihanna Challenge	Incorporate a Mic Stand in the Routine	"Where Have You Been"; Rihanna	Bottom 2
8: LMFAO Challenge	Must perform Robotics and Transform into a giant Robot	"Champagne Showers"; LMFAO feat. Natalia Kills	Safe
9: David Guetta Challenge	The crews had to demonstrate their versatility by creating a routine that incorporated three different styles of dance.	Gloving: "Memories"; David Guetta feat. Kid Cudi; Doll Movements: "Turn Me On"; David Guetta feat. Nicki Minaj; Gliding: "Without You"; David Guetta feat. Usher	Bottom 2
9: David Guetta Challenge	Had to Battle Mos Wanted Crew for the last spot in the Top 2	"Feel So Close"; Calvin Harris	Saved By Judges
10: The Katy Perry Live Finale	Partner: 8 Flavahz	"Wide Awake"; Katy Perry	Champions
10: The Katy Perry Live Finale	Perform for the last time with Poreotix before Winner of ABDC's Announcement	"Part of Me"; Katy Perry	Champions
10: The Katy Perry Live Finale	Victory Dance after being announced season 7 ABDC winners	"Starships"; Nicki Minaj	Champions

=== Injuries ===
Member Chris Thomas injured his knee during rehearsal and missed the performances of weeks 2 and 3.

== Post-ABDC ==
After ABDC, the Elektrolytes competed again at the 2012 Hip Hop International. They received silver in the USA Adult Division and 4th Place in the World Adult Division. The Elektrolytes were dancing while traveling on tour, but now are on ABDC season 8.

Preceded by I.aM.mE	America's Best Dance Crew Champions; Elektrolytes	Succeeded by Quest Crew
