= Speakerphone (song) =

2007 song by Kylie Minogue

Song by Kylie Minogue

from the album X
- Released: 21 November 2007
- Genre: Dance; electronic; funk
- Length: 3:54
- Label: Parlophone
- Songwriters: Christian Karlsson; Pontus Winnberg; Henrik Jonback; Klas Åhlund
- Producer: Bloodshy and Avant

Audio video
- "Speakerphone" on YouTube

"Speakerphone" is a song by Australian singer Kylie Minogue for her tenth studio album X (2007). It was produced by Bloodshy & Avant duo Christian Karlsson and Pontus Winnberg, who co-wrote it with Henrik Jonback and Klas Åhlund. The song featured dance, electronic, and funk elements. It heavily used Auto-Tune and vocoder, which caused some critics to liken it to music by Britney Spears and Daft Punk. "Speakerphone" received mixed responses from critics. The song appeared on the Canadian Hot 100 and the Hot Canadian Digital Singles Billboard charts.

"Speakerphone" was performed on the KylieX2008 and For You, for Me concert tours. In 2008, Fanny Pak performed to the song for the season two premiere of America's Best Dance Crew. In 2009, a competition was held for fans to create a video for the song, which was won by Hungarian animator Rudolf Pap.

== Background and release ==
Bloodshy & Avant duo Christian Karlsson and Pontus Winnberg produced "Speakerphone" and co-wrote it with Henrik Jonback and Klas Åhlund. Kylie Minogue talked about the song, which was included on her tenth studio album X, in an interview, "Xposed – Interview with Kylie". She described the song as catchy, and said she particularly enjoyed the lyrics. She likened her vocals to a "quite straight delivery", which she compared to a person singing or humming around their home.

"Speakerphone" was released on 21 November 2007 as part of X; it was removed from the album's Chinese edition, along with "Like a Drug" and "Nu-Di-Ty", due to censorship laws. On 20 January 2015, the song was uploaded to Minogue's YouTube account as part of a X playlist.

== Composition and lyrics ==
Opening with a harp instrumental, "Speakerphone" includes the lyrics "track repeat go on and on" and "set [our] mind on Freaky Mode". Critics labelled the song as a dance, electronic, and funk song. Writing for the New York Times News Service, Kelefa Sanneh called it a "meta-dance song intoxicated with itself". Likening the lyrics to a sexual version of Operation, NewNowNext.com's Louis Virtel said the song is about "connecting our collarbone to our neckbone to our jawbone".

In the song, Minogue's voice is heavily processed through Auto-Tune and vocoder. Critics compared the style to the "robotic hypno-funk" of Daft Punk and noted that its use of "array of robo voices" had similarities with the music of Britney Spears. Music journalist Craig Mathieson described Minogue's vocals as "taken to fetishistic levels, wiping the person and leaving the digital construct", and said she had "disappear[ed] into the ether". In 2013, the composition was a subject of a lawsuit in which Salsoul Records claimed Minogue and Warner Bros. duplicated the "entire rhythm" of Gaz's 1978 song "Sing Sing" for "Speakerphone".

== Reception ==
The song received mixed responses from critics. Music journalist Robert Christgau and the Scripps Howard News Service's Chuck Campbell cited it as one of the album's high points. British GQ's Alexis Petridis praised "Speakerphone" as "cool electro". Louis Virtel included it on a listicle on Minogue's top 50 songs, and called it an earworm. VH1's Christopher Rosa recommended "Speakerphone", as well as Minogue's other songs "Too Much" (2010) and "Love Affair" (2001), for people unfamiliar with her music. PopMatters' Evan Sawdey preferred Minogue's robotic vocals on "Speakerphone" to those of Britney Spears in her fifth studio album Blackout (2007), writing that she "never falters once, hitting the mark each and every time". In a 2010 Instinct interview, Minogue described the song as one of the "moments that were a bit ahead of their time". During a 2012 HuffPost interview, she said that people questioned why "Speakerphone" or "Like a Drug" were not released as singles.

Some critics identified the song as one of the album's low points. The Morning Call's Andy Hermann labelled "Speakerphone" and "All I See" as "clunkers". The Vancouver Sun's Amy O'Brien dismissed "Speakerphone" as a "forced attempt at originality", saying that she wanted to skip it. AllMusic's Chris True felt the song would have been more appropriate for Robbie Williams' seventh studio album Rudebox (2006), and Pitchfork's Tom Ewing believed it was too similar to Daft Punk's music. Criticizing the vocoder as excessive, Dave Hughes of Slant Magazine wrote that the song indicated a hip hop influence on the overall album, which he felt was "wholly inappropriate" for Minogue.

Despite never being released as a single, "Speakerphone" charted on the Canadian Hot 100 at number 87 based on high downloads from the album. It also peaked at number 56 on the Hot Canadian Digital Singles Billboard chart on 15 December 2007.

== Promotion ==
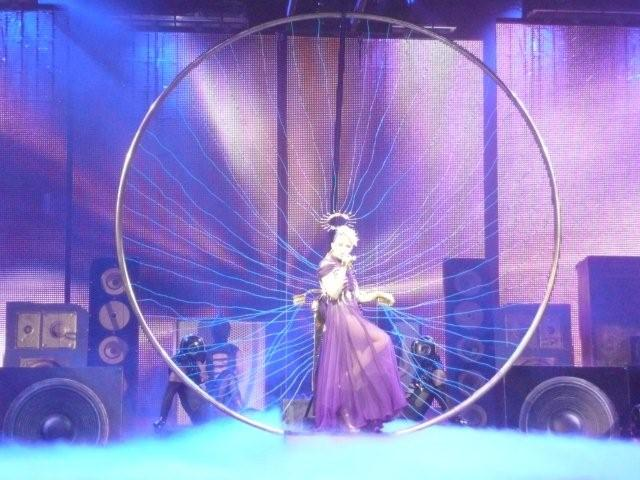
Minogue singing "Speakerphone" on the KylieX2008 tour

Minogue was initially concerned about how she would perform "Speakerphone" live due to its layered vocals. She performed the song on the KylieX2008 and For You, for Me concert tours in 2008 and 2009, respectively. It was the opening number for KylieX2008, in which Minogue descended on stage in a gold hoop. During the first Australian show, Minogue wore a gladiator-style dress, and for her Auckland performance, she had an Egyptian-inspired costume instead.

During For You, for Me, "Speakerphone" was the second song on the set list after "Light Years" from the 2000 album of the same name. For the performance, Minogue was accompanied by backup dancers dressed like robots. Minogue's performances of "Speakerphone" were included in the video album KylieX2008 (2008) and the live album Live in New York (2009). The first half of For You, for Me was streamed live on 12 December 2009 via Minogue's YouTube account.

"Speakerphone" was also performed by Fanny Pak for the season two premiere of America's Best Dance Crew in 2008. In 2009, a competition was held to make a video for the song; it was won by Hungarian animator Rudolf Pap.

== Charts ==
Chart (2008)	Peak position
Canadian Hot 100	87
