= Fanny Pak =

American dance crew

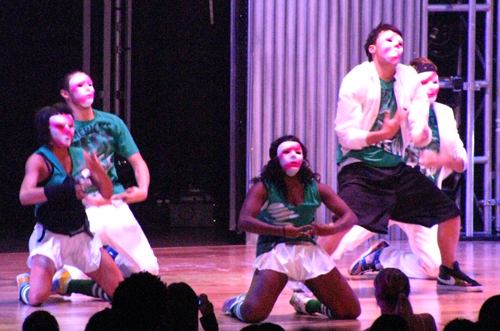
- Fanny Pak performing at Paramount Theatre in Oakland, California on the America's Best Dance Crew Live tour.

General information
- Name: Fanny Pak
- Year founded: 2008
- Founding choreographers: Matt Cady
- Website: www.fannypak.com

Fanny Pak is a ten-member contemporary, hip-hop and jazz-trained dance crew from Los Angeles, California that gained popularity after appearing on the second season of MTV's America's Best Dance Crew (ABDC). Often while performing, the crew wears bright clothes and bold patterns reminiscent of the 1980s as well as fanny packs, which is where their crew name originated. In addition, all of the members were born in the 1980s. The crew returned to ABDC on the seventh season, placing fifth in the competition.

== Members ==
=== Matt Cady ===
Matt Cady (born October 17, 1985) formed Fanny Pak while he was teaching at Debbie Reynolds Dance Studio in North Hollywood, California. Other than teaching at Debbie Reynolds, Matt choreographed the stage show Grease for the 2004 Fringe Festival in Scotland. He also choreographed a music video and a promotional tour for the independent singer Natalise. His dancing credits include Missy Elliott, ABC Family's The Secret Life of the American Teenager, Jessica Simpson, Finger 11, and Erin Hamilton. Aside from Fanny Pak, Matt is also a member of Collide Dance Company and Unity Dance Ensemble.

Before appearing on MTV, Matt and his fellow crew members performed at The Carnival: Choreographer’s Ball, a monthly performance showcase for dancers/choreographers to perform in front of other professional dancers. He is a faculty member at the Edge Performing Arts Center, Triple Threat Dance, and Intrigue Dance. He is represented by DDO Artists Agency.

=== Beau Fournier ===
Beau Fournier (born July 1, 1983) is from the San Fernando Valley in Southern California. At the late age of 19, Beau started dance and it turned into a career. He is currently signed with DDO Artists Agency and Artist's International. Some of Beau's credits include: Angel Faith VH1 Save the Music Tour, Paula DeAnda, Diet Pepsi, The Carnival: Choreographer’s Ball, ABC Family's The Secret Life of the American Teenager, Missy Elliott, Lil Mama, and the MTV Video Music Awards. He also worked with dance groups such as the California State University, Northridge Hip Hop Team, Culture Shock LA, Expressive Doubt LA, and Asylum Dance Company. Beau is an instructor at Elements Dance Space. At Jayvee Dance Center, he created two dance companies: Mischief Makers, an adult exhibition team and Trouble Makers, his teen competing team

=== Natalie Gilmore ===
Natalie Gilmore (born December 30, 1985) grew up in Seattle, Washington. She has been dancing since the age of 5, training in all areas including ballet, tap, jazz, and hip-hop. Natalie moved to Los Angeles at age 19 and since then has trained under many teacher/choreographers including Marty Kudelka, David Moore, and Tessandra Chavez. Natalie toured the world as a back-up dancer for Avril Lavigne and worked with Joe Jonas promoting his newest solo album "Fastlife." She is currently on tour with Justin Timberlake for his "20/20 Experience" Tour.

=== Tiffani Grant ===
Originally from Antioch, California, Tiffani began dancing her freshmen year at Deer Valley High School where she trained in jazz, modern, ballet, African, hula, and jazz-funk. Dance carried over into her college education at California State University, Northridge where she trained in modern and ballet on her path to become a dance therapist. Since her move to southern California she's studied with various choreographers such as Tony G., Travis Payne, and Keith Young. Before she discovered her passion for dance, Tiffani was a cheerleader and coached nationally ranked youth cheerleading and hip-hop teams. She still choreographs pom competition routines for her former high school. She became a song leading instructor for the United Spirit Association where she teaches cheer camps to high school and middle school students all over the west coast. Tiffani did not compete on season seven of ABDC in order to focus on school, but she is still part of Fanny Pak.

=== Cara Horibe ===
Cara "Barracuda" Horibe (born May 31, 1984) started dancing at the age of 9 in Hawaii. She began teaching with 24-VII Danceforce while training in jazz, hip-hop, ballet, contemporary, swing, and gymnastics. Cara moved to Los Angeles in 2006 to pursue a career in dance. She has continued to train and assist under various choreographers such as Erica Sobol, Gil Duldalao, Kevin Maher, and So You Think You Can Dance alumnus Mark Kanemura. She also became a member of the contemporary dance company Collide under the direction of Erica Sobol in 2007 and joined Fanny Pak in 2008. Cara is a faculty member for Boogiezone and Broadway Dance Center. Her dance credits include Missy Elliott, Lil Mama, MTV Video Music Awards, High School Musical 3, Canon Electronics, and LA Fashion Week. Cara also appeared as one of the back-up dancers in the 2009 Janet Jackson music video, Make Me.

=== Megan Lawson ===
Megan Lawson (born November 19, 1985) began training in tap, jazz, ballet, contemporary, and hip-hop in her hometown Calgary, Alberta, Canada at Dance Spectrum Inc. Megan later became a faculty member for Triple Threat Dance Convention in Vancouver. In 2006, Megan moved to Los Angeles to pursue a career in dance. Other than being a member of Fanny Pak, Megan's credits include Missy Elliott, Lil Mama, MTV's Video Music Awards, Another Cinderella Story, Canon Electronics, New Balance, BODOG Poker, SONY, Boogiezone's World Hip Hop Showcase, and LA Fashion week.

=== Glenda Morales ===
Glenda Morales (born October 23, 1987) started training and competing in gymnastics before deciding to get serious with dance. She started ballet, jazz, tap, lyrical, and modern at age 11 and began competing right away. At California State University, Fullerton, Glenda began as a dance major and was performing at Disneyland as a dancer and acrobat until she was offered representation by DDO Artists Agency. Her major changed from dance to communications with emphasis in entertainment studies. Since joining DDO, Glenda has danced for artists such as including Keke Palmer, Raven-Symoné, and Ashley Tisdale. She also appeared in the 2009 cheerleading movie Fired Up!. Glenda was on the cover of the new Harlequin book, Chasing Romeo, and was featured in the 12th episode of the sixth season of The Office as one of "Scott's Tots." She also appeared as a dancer on Glee in the episode "Funk."

=== Preston Mui ===
Preston Mui is a professional dancer, choreographer, and actor, who joined Fanny Pak before their second appearance on America's Best Dance Crew. He has been featured in music videos and international tours for major label performing artists, including Janet Jackson, Britney Spears, Mariah Carey, Christina Aguilera, JLo, Black Eyed Peas, and Paulina Rubio. As an actor, he has appeared in national commercials for McDonald's, Old Navy, and Target, and in network TV shows like The Voice, 2 Broke Girls, Parenthood and American Idol. He has also worked as a personal stylist for New Kids on the Block and the Glee tour. Currently, Preston Mui teaches at The Edge Performing Arts Center in Hollywood, CA, on tour with the Dance League Convention and is the creative director of an all-Asian female dance crew called "The Dynasties."

== America's Best Dance Crew ==
In 2008, Fanny Pak appeared on the second season of America's Best Dance Crew and finished in third place behind runner-up, SoReal Cru, and the season champion, Super Cr3w. Ironically, the judges voted them off on the episode themed "80's night", where each crew had to make up a routine using music and dances that were made popular in the 1980s. After the second season was over, they returned for a two-part ABDC special, Battle of the VMA's. During the MTV special presentation, popular crews from seasons one and two competed for an opportunity to win $25,000 for charity and to present the 2008 VMA for Best Dancing in a Video. Other than Fanny Pak, alumni crews BreakSk8, SoReal Cru, Kaba Modern, and Status Quo participated in the event. BreakSk8 and Status Quo were eliminated in the preliminary rounds. After the public voted, Fanny Pak and Kaba Modern moved on, eliminating SoReal Cru for having the fewest votes. After a dance off, the public voted once again, and it was announced during the VMA's that Fanny Pak won. They are the only dance crew to ever receive an award at the MTV Video Music Awards. They later went on the America's Best Dance Crew Live tour with Jabbawockeez, Super Cr3w, Breaksk8, and ASIID.

In 2012, it was announced that Fanny Pak had been selected to compete in the seventh season of America's Best Dance Crew, which marked the first time a dance crew appeared to compete on the show twice. Fanny Pak had five of the same members from season two and four new members. Previous member Phil left Fanny Pak a year prior to pursue other projects, while Tiffani was focusing on college and chose not to participate. The crew was eliminated during the seventh week, placing fifth overall.

== Performances on ABDC ==
=== Season 2 ===
| Week | Challenge | Song | Result |
|---|---|---|---|
| 0: Live Auditions Special | None | "11h30" by Danger | Safe |
| 1: Crew's Choice Challenge | None | "Speakerphone" by Kylie Minogue | Bottom 2 |
| 2: Video Star Challenge | Perform some choreography from the video in the routine | "Wind It Up" by Gwen Stefani featuring Pharrell | Safe |
| 3: Rock the Title Challenge | Create an illusion of actual toy soldiers on stage | "Toy Soldier" by Britney Spears | Safe |
| 4: Speed Up Challenge | Transition from a slow tempo song to a fast one | "Touch My Body" by Mariah Carey | Safe |
| 5: Janet Jackson Challenge | Incorporate Janet's famous moves into the routine | "All Nite (Don't Stop)" by Janet Jackson | Safe |
| 6: Bring The Beat Challenge | Make beats on stage using props found in a gym | "Spaz" by N.E.R.D | Safe |
| 7: Missy Elliott Challenge | Incorporate footwork from the video into their own style | "Get Ur Freak On" by Missy Elliott | Bottom 2 |
| 8: Eighties Theme Challenge | Challenge #1: Perform the "Vanilla Ice" dance move horizontally | "Lean on Me" by Club Nouveau/"Ice Ice Baby" by Vanilla Ice | Eliminated |
| 8: Eighties Theme Challenge | Challenge #2: Incorporate elements from the film Flashdance | "Maniac" (from Flashdance) by Michael Sembello | Eliminated |
| 10: The Live Finale | None | "Go Hard or Go Home" by E-40 (with Supreme Soul & Super Cr3w) | Returning |

=== Season 7 ===
| Week | Challenge | Song | Result |
|---|---|---|---|
| 1: Britney Spears Challenge | None | "Womanizer" by Britney Spears | Safe |
| 2: Flo Rida Challenge | None | N/A | N/A |
| 3: Madonna Challenge | Incorporate waacking and heels into their routine | "Girl Gone Wild" by Madonna | Safe |
| 4: Drake Challenge | Create a treadmill | "Make Me Proud" by Drake featuring Nicki Minaj | Bottom 2 |
| 5: J.Lo Challenge | Change clothes and incorporate a four-man lift during their routine | "Waiting for Tonight" by Jennifer Lopez | Bottom 3 |
| 6: Pitbull Challenge | Incorporate Indian Bollywood dance styles in their routine | "International Love" by Pitbull featuring Chris Brown | Bottom 2 |
| 7: Rihanna Challenge | Incorporate color guard rifle spins | "Talk That Talk" by Rihanna featuring Jay-Z | Eliminated |

== Other projects ==
Outside of ABDC, Fanny Pak has continued to find success. They choreographed and danced in Lil Mama's "Truly In Love" video which featured season four So You Think You Can Dance alumnus Mark Kanemura as well as Supreme Soul crew members Frost and George. The video was choreographed by Matt Cady. They also had a line of sneakers, the Battle collection, through the independent shoe company, MilkShake Kicks in New York City. The Battle I and the Battle Black were released in September 2009. Fanny Pak choreographed, and was featured in, a commercial for the relaunch of the Hasbro children's toy Bop It. Fanny Pak is also mentioned in the 2009 Lil Wayne song "Watch My Shoes". They made an appearance in the Toni Braxton music video "Make My Heart." Fanny Pak is featured in the film Honey 2 starring Katerina Graham and Randy Wayne which was released in cinemas on June 10, 2011. Matt Cady choreographed French house group Yelle's double music video "Safari Disco Club/Que Veux-Tu". The rest of Fanny Pak appeared in the video as featured dancers.

=== Fanny Pak Album ===
Fanny Pak released a full-length dance album featuring all seven crew members from season two and special guest appearances from artists such as Taboo from The Black Eyed Peas, Chonique Sneed, and Far East Movement. The first single from their debut album, "Something Sick" was featured in a segment about Fanny Pak on The Logo Channel's NewNowNextPopLab. The crew recorded the album with District 78, the producers behind the master mixes for America's Best Dance Crew. A preview EP, entitled "A Touch of Fanny" was released on August 17, 2010. The songs released on the EP were "Something Sick," "Show Out," and "Close to You."

== Management ==
Fanny Pak is represented by Artist International in Los Angeles. Arnel Calvario, the founder of Kaba Modern, and Joel Newton are Fanny Pak's managers.
