= America's Best Dance Crew season 7 =

America's Best Dance Crew
- Season 7
- Hosted by: Mario Lopez
- Judges: JC Chasez; Lil Mama; D-Trix
- Winner: Elektrolytes

Release
- Original network: MTV
- Original release: April 11 – June 13, 2012

Season chronology
- ← Previous; Season 6 Next → Season 8

The seventh season of America's Best Dance Crew, also known as America's Best Dance Crew: Return of the Superstars, premiered on April 11, 2012. Return of the Superstars used the same show format of the previous season, in which the crews performed to the music of one specific artist each week. The season featured artists including Rihanna, Britney Spears, Madonna, Pitbull, David Guetta, LMFAO, Jennifer Lopez, Drake, Flo Rida, and Katy Perry. In the live finale, which aired on June 13, 2012, Elektrolytes was declared the winner.

== Cast ==
Auditions for the seventh season of America's Best Dance Crew were held in four cities: Chicago, Houston, New York City, and Los Angeles.

Dance Crew	Hometown	Region
8 Flavahz	Honolulu, Hawaii	Pacific
Collizion Crew	Atlanta, Georgia	South
Elektrolytes	Gilbert, Arizona	West
Fanny Pak	San Fernando Valley, California	West
Funkdation	Monterrey, Mexico	Sur
Irratik	Montreal, Canada	North
Mix'd Elements	North Hollywood, California	West
Mos Wanted Crew	Los Angeles, California	West
Rated Next Generation	Mukilteo, Washington	Northwest
Stepboys	Roseville, California	West

== Results ==
Rank	Dance Crew	Episode									
Rank	Dance Crew	1	2	3	4	5	6	7	8	9	10
1	Elektrolytes		IN	IN	IN	IN	IN	RISK	IN	RISK	WINNER
2	8 Flavahz	IN		IN	IN	IN	IN	IN	RISK	IN	RUNNER-UP
3	Mos Wanted Crew		IN	IN	IN	IN	IN	IN	IN	OUT	
4	Rated Next Generation		IN	IN	IN	RISK	RISK^{2}	IN	OUT		
5	Fanny Pak	IN		IN	RISK	RISK	RISK^{2}	OUT			
6	Collizion Crew		IN	RISK	IN	OUT					
7	Stepboys	IN		IN	OUT						
9	Funkdation		RISK^{1}	OUT							
9	Irratik	IN		OUT							
10	Mix'd Elements	RISK^{1}	OUT^{1}								

^Note 1: The bottom crew from the first episode battled the bottom crew from the second episode to determine the first elimination of the season.
^Note 2: The judges saved both crews from elimination.

Key
(WINNER) The dance crew won the competition and was crowned "America's Best Dance Crew".
(RUNNER-UP) The dance crew was the runner-up in the competition.
(IN) The dance crew was safe from elimination.
(RISK) The dance crew was at risk for elimination.
(OUT) The dance crew was eliminated from the competition.

== Episodes ==
=== Episode 1: Britney Spears Challenge ===
- Original Airdate: April 11, 2012

The season kicked off with the first round of crews dancing to a remix of "I Wanna Go". Then, the crews incorporated Spears' hits into their routines. The judges selected four crews to advance to the next round, while the crew who did not make the cut faced elimination in the following week's episode.

Dance Crew	Song
8 Flavahz	"3"
Mix'd Elements	"Till the World Ends"
Irratik	"Hold It Against Me"
Stepboys	"If U Seek Amy"
Fanny Pak	"Womanizer"

- Safe: Fanny Pak, 8 Flavahz, Irratik, Stepboys
- Bottom: Mix'd Elements

=== Episode 2: Flo Rida Challenge ===
- Original Airdate: April 18, 2012

The other five competing crews danced to "Wild Ones" featuring Sia, with Flo Rida performing alongside them. Flo Rida then joined the judges table as a special guest judge. Later, the crews crafted their own routines inspired by his songs. After the judges decided the four dance crews that were safe, the bottom crew battled Mix'd Elements to a remix of "Turn Around" to determine which one would be the first eliminated.

Dance Crew	Song
Elektrolytes	"Club Can't Handle Me" feat. David Guetta
Rated Next Generation	"Right Round" feat. Kesha
Collizion Crew	"Low" feat. T-Pain
Funkdation	"Good Feeling"
Mos Wanted Crew	"In the Ayer" feat. will.i.am

- Safe: Mos Wanted Crew, Collizion Crew, Rated Next Generation, Elektrolytes
- Bottom: Funkdation
- Eliminated: Mix'd Elements

=== Episode 3: Madonna Challenge ===
- Original Airdate: April 25, 2012

The nine remaining crews choreographed routines inspired by Madonna's music videos. Each crew had to incorporate their music video's signature dance style into their routine. In this episode, two teams were sent home after a double-elimination.

Dance Crew	Song	Dance Style
Fanny Pak	"Girl Gone Wild"	Waacking
Elektrolytes	"Hung Up"	Krumping
Mos Wanted Crew	"4 Minutes" feat. Justin Timberlake and Timbaland	Popping
8 Flavahz	"Vogue"	Voguing
Rated Next Generation	"Human Nature"	Thrashing
Stepboys	"Ray Of Light"	Spazzing
Collizion Crew	"Don't Tell Me"	Country line dancing
Funkdation	"Give Me All Your Luvin'" feat. Nicki Minaj and M.I.A.	Cheerleading
Irratik	"Express Yourself"	Jazz steps

- Safe: Fanny Pak, Elektrolytes, Mos Wanted Crew, 8 Flavahz, Rated Next Generation, Stepboys
- Bottom 3: Collizion Crew, Funkdation, Irratik
- Eliminated: Funkdation, Irratik

=== Episode 4: Drake Challenge ===
- Original Airdate: May 2, 2012

The seven remaining crews selected lyrics from their assigned Drake songs and "brought them to life."

Dance Crew	Song	Chosen Lyric	Challenge
Rated Next Generation	"HYFR" feat. Lil Wayne	"Time for me to revisit the past."	Perform a section of the routine in reverse.
Mos Wanted Crew	"The Motto" feat. Lil Wayne and Tyga	"Tell Tune 'Light one, pass it like a relay'."	Create a relay.
8 Flavahz	"Find Your Love"	"I bet if I give all my lovin', nothin's gonna tear us apart."	Become connected at some point.
Collizion Crew	"Over"	"So I'm riding through this city with my high beams on."	Create a car.
Elektrolytes	"Headlines"	"Floating in and out of consciousness."	Create the illusion that someone is levitating.
Fanny Pak	"Make Me Proud" feat. Nicki Minaj	"Running on a treadmill and only eating salad."	Create a treadmill.
Stepboys	"Best I Ever Had"	"Every single show she out there reppin' like a mascot."	Incorporate a mascot.

- Safe: Rated Next Generation, Mos Wanted Crew, 8 Flavahz, Collizion Crew, Elektrolytes
- Bottom 2: Fanny Pak, Stepboys
- Eliminated: Stepboys

=== Episode 5: Jennifer Lopez Challenge ===
- Original Airdate: May 9, 2012

The six remaining crews paid tribute to Jennifer Lopez. Her choreographer, Beau "Casper" Smart, worked with the crews during rehearsals. Each crew's challenge was to highlight a defining moment in Lopez's career. Smart also gave them an additional challenge that linked to their initial challenge.

Dance Crew	Song	Initial Challenge	Additional Challenge
8 Flavahz	"Let's Get Loud"	Incorporate salsa dancing.	Incorporate trumpets.
Mos Wanted Crew	"On the Floor" feat. Pitbull	Incorporate floorwork.	Hype the audience.
Elektrolytes	"Get Right"	Create a moving subway car.	Incorporate canes.
Collizion Crew	"Jenny from the Block" feat. Styles P and Jadakiss	Incorporate popping, locking, and b-boy moves.	Perform a specific J. Lo move.
Rated Next Generation	"Do It Well"	Incorporate the new jack swing dance style.	Perform the move called "The Wop".
Fanny Pak	"Waiting for Tonight"	Change clothes during the routine.	Incorporate a four-man lift.

- Safe: 8 Flavahz, Mos Wanted Crew, Elektrolytes
- Bottom 3: Collizion Crew, Rated Next Generation, Fanny Pak
- Eliminated: Collizion Crew

=== Episode 6: Pitbull Challenge ===
- Original Airdate: May 16, 2012

The five remaining dance crews began the episode with a dance number to "I Like How It Feels: The Remix" featuring Enrique Iglesias and The WAV.s, alongside Season 6 Runner-Up ICONic Boyz. Then, each crew was given a country and an international dance style to incorporate into their routines. In a two-way tie, the Bottom 2 crews advanced to the next round, marking the first time the judges saved both bottom crews from elimination.

Dance Crew	Song	Country	Dance Style
Elektrolytes	"I Know You Want Me"	Brazil	Capoeira
8 Flavahz	"Hey Baby" feat. T-Pain	France	Can-can
Mos Wanted Crew	"Give Me Everything" feat. Ne-Yo, Afrojack, and Nayer	Russia	Barynya
Fanny Pak	"International Love" feat. Chris Brown	India	Bollywood
Rated Next Generation	"Hotel Room Service"	China	Dance of 1000 Hands

- Safe: Elektrolytes, 8 Flavahz, Mos Wanted Crew
- Bottom 2: Fanny Pak, Rated Next Generation
- Eliminated: None

=== Episode 7: Rihanna Challenge ===
- Original Airdate: May 23, 2012

The five remaining crews created dance routines inspired by Rihanna, beginning with a group performance to "We Found Love" featuring Calvin Harris. Unlike last season, where her choreographer distributed the challenges, Rihanna delivered them to the crews herself.

Dance Crew	Song	Challenge
Rated Next Generation	"You da One"	Incorporate tricks using bowler hats.
8 Flavahz	"Birthday Cake"	Create a fire effect and extinguish it.
Mos Wanted Crew	"Cockiness"	Use jackets to create pictures of confidence.
Elektrolytes	"Where Have You Been"	Incorporate a microphone stand.
Fanny Pak	"Talk That Talk" feat. Jay-Z	Incorporate color guard rifle spins.

- Safe: Rated Next Generation, 8 Flavahz, Mos Wanted Crew
- Bottom 2: Elektrolytes, Fanny Pak
- Eliminated: Fanny Pak

=== Episode 8: LMFAO Challenge ===
- Original Airdate: May 30, 2012

The four remaining crews danced to songs by LMFAO, beginning with a group performance to "Live My Life" by Far East Movement featuring Justin Bieber. Redfoo from LMFAO handed out the dance challenges and Quest Crew visited the rehearsal studio to work with the crews.

Dance Crew	Song	Challenge
Mos Wanted Crew	"Sexy and I Know It"	Create a catwalk with wiggle-inspired runway modeling.
Elektrolytes	"Champagne Showers" feat. Natalia Kills	Perform robotic moves while transforming into a giant robot.
Rated Next Generation	"Sorry for Party Rocking"	Recreate the 15-second dance breakdown from the video.
8 Flavahz	"Party Rock Anthem" feat. Lauren Bennett and GoonRock	Recreate the group blow-up from the video, and incorporate "The T-step" and "The Spongebob".

- Safe: Mos Wanted Crew, Elektrolytes
- Bottom 2: Rated Next Generation, 8 Flavahz
- Eliminated: Rated Next Generation

=== Episode 9: David Guetta Challenge ===
- Original Airdate: June 6, 2012

The top three crews competed for the two spots in the championship round to the music of David Guetta. Unlike the format from previous episodes, the crews performed first before the voting results were revealed. Guetta gave each crew the same song mix and challenges to incorporate into their routines. Then, they did a group number to "Titanium" featuring Sia.

Song	Challenge
"Memories" feat. Kid Cudi	Gloving
"Turn Me On" feat. Nicki Minaj	Move like dolls
"Without You" feat. Usher	Gliding

- Safe: 8 Flavahz
- Bottom 2: Elektrolytes, Mos Wanted Crew

After the Bottom 2 was announced, the two crews had to dance battle to determine which one would advance to the finale.

Dance Crew	Song
Mos Wanted Crew	"Somebody That I Used to Know" by Gotye feat. Kimbra
Elektrolytes	"Feel So Close" by Calvin Harris

- Eliminated: Mos Wanted Crew

=== Episode 10: Katy Perry Challenge ===
- Original Airdate: June 13, 2012

The final two crews danced to music from the concert film, Katy Perry: Part of Me, after meeting the pop starlet. Then, the winner was crowned. The show also featured performances by past ABDC champions.

Dance Crew(s)	Song
8 Flavahz and Elektrolytes	"Wide Awake"
Elektrolytes and Poreotix	"Part of Me"
8 Flavahz and We Are Heroes	"T.G.I.F." feat. Missy Elliott
I.aM.mE	"E.T." feat. Kanye West
Elektrolytes	"Starships" by Nicki Minaj

- Winner: Elektrolytes
- Runner-Up: 8 Flavahz
