= István Orosz =

Hungarian artist (born 1951)

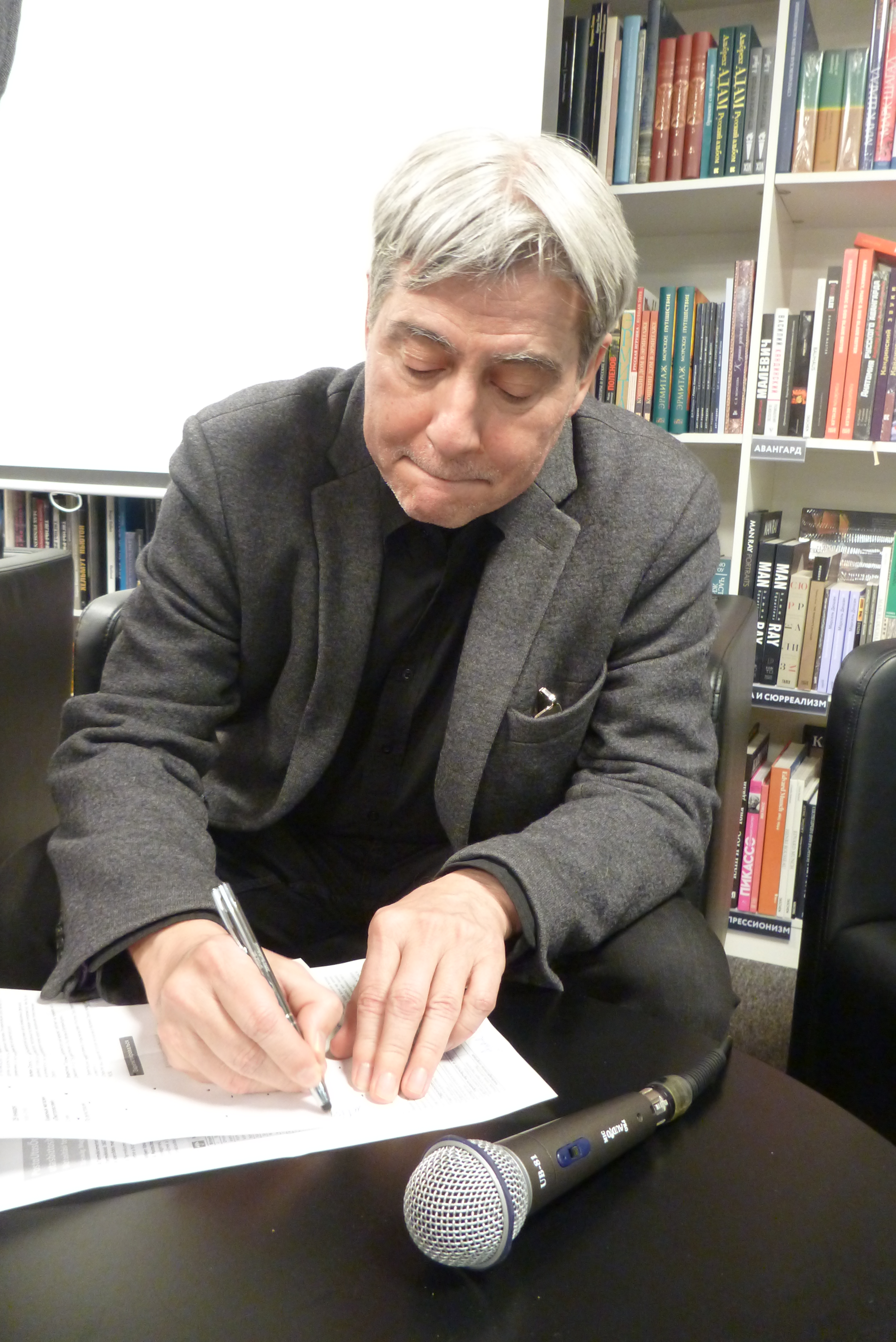
- Orosz in 2019
- Born: 24 October 1951 (age 74); Kecskemét, Hungary
- Education: Budapest College of Applied Arts
- Known for: Graphic design, animation, painting
- Other name: Utisz

István Orosz (born 24 October 1951) is a Hungarian painter, printmaker, graphic designer and animated film director. He is known for his mathematically inspired works, impossible objects, optical illusions, double-meaning images and anamorphoses. The geometric art of István Orosz, with forced perspectives and optical illusions, has been compared to works by M. C. Escher.

== Biography ==
He was born in Kecskemét. He studied at the Hungarian University of Arts and Design (now Moholy-Nagy University of Art and Design) in Budapest as a pupil of István Balogh and Ernő Rubik. After graduating in 1975 he began to deal with theatre as a stage designer and animated film as animator and film director. He is known as painter, printmaker, poster designer, and illustrator as well. He likes to use visual paradox, double meaning images, and illusionistic approaches while following traditional printing techniques such as woodcutting and etching. He also tries to renew the technique of anamorphosis. He is a regular participant in the major international biennials of posters and graphic art and his works have been shown in individual and group exhibitions in Hungary and abroad. Film director at the PannóniaFilm Studio in Budapest, Habil. professor at University of West Hungary in Sopron, co-founder of Hungarian Poster Association, member of Alliance Graphique International (AGI) and Hungarian Art Academie. He often uses ΟΥΤΙΣ, or Utisz, (pronounced: outis) (No one) as artist's pseudonym.

== Quotes ==
- "Utisz - It was the Homeric hero Odysseus, who fought the Cyclops, had used this name, and had put out the monster's eye. I imagine that poster is nothing else but an Odysseus' gesture: some kind of attack upon the eye."
- "If you want to create a poster try to explain your idea in a sentence. Then try to reduce it, leave out phrases, attributes until you just have the bare essentials. When you do not need any letter at all you are ready with the poster."
- "... When I have drawn these impossible objects, I did hope everybody would understand my intention, the intention of a Hungarian designer at the end of the 20th century who does not tell the truth just in order to be caught in the act."
- "There are things I can imagine and I can draw. There are things I can imagine but I cannot draw. But, could I draw something that I cannot imagine? That interests me greatly."

== Introduction by Guy D'Obonner ==
During the last two decades – when most of the works shown here were made – the activities of the poster designer, the printmaker, the illustrator, and the film director have completed each other. Many motive, stylistic features, technical solutions appeared in all of the media and for Orosz it seemingly did not cause any problem to cross the borders of the different genres. When he was drawing a poster usually he did it with the preciseness of illustrators, when he was illustrating a book, he did it with the narrative mood of filmmakers, if he was animating films, sometimes he used the several layers approach of etchers and engravers and for prints he often chose the emblematic simplifying way of depiction of posters. If we call him only a poster designer based on his functional prints, we narrow down his field of activity, we go closer to the truth if we associate him with „postering" as a way of thinking, or if we call his many sided image depicting ourselves and our age as the poster-mirror of István Orosz. (Guy d'Obonner: Transfiguration of Poster - detail)

== Poster art ==
István Orosz was known as poster designer in the first part of his career. He made mainly cultural posters for theatres, movies, galleries, museums and publishing houses At the time of the revolutions of 1989 in Eastern Europe he drew some political posters too. His "Tovarishi Adieu" (also used with text "Tovarishi Koniec" – that means Comrades it is over) appeared in many countries and it was known as symbolic image of changes in the area.

== His anamorphoses ==
Artists who design anamorphosis (anamorphosis is Greek for "re-transformation") play with perspective to create a distorted image that appears normal only when viewed from the correct angle or with the aid of curved mirrors. The technique was often used by Renaissance-era artists. Orosz tries to renew the technique of anamorphosis and his aim is to develop it as well when he gives a meaning to the distorted image, too. It is not an amorph picture any more, but a meaningful depiction that is independent from the result that appears in the mirror or viewed from a special point of view.

This approach of anamorphoses is suitable for expressing more sophisticated messages, and it fits to show more amusing fun.

== Exhibitions ==
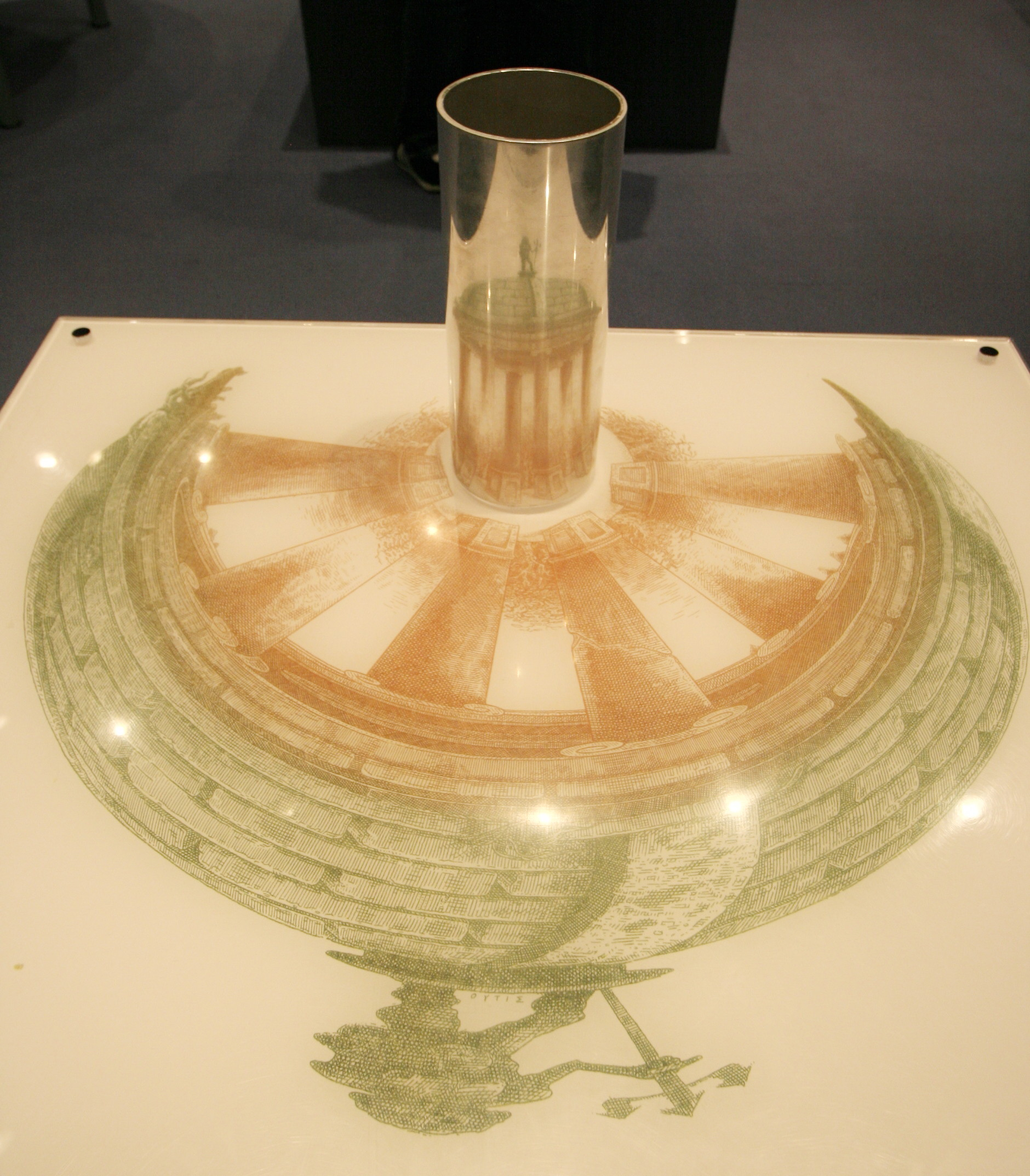
One of Orosz's anamorphoses

- 1997 Chicago, I Space Gallery
- 1997 Thessaloniki, Aristotelian University
- 1998 Bethlehem, Pennsylvania, (Payne Gallery, Moravian College)
- 2000 Silkeborg, Kunst Center
- 2000 Istanbul, Bilgi Üniversitesi
- 2002 Bratislava, Slovenska Narodná Galeria
- 2004 Toruń, Galeria Sztuki Wozownia
- 2004 The Hague, Escher Museum
- 2006 Budapest, Ernst Museum
- 2007 Essen, Grillo Theater
- 2008 Jorwert, Reformed Church
- 2009 Melbourne, Glen Eira City Council Gallery
- 2009 TMDG2009, Argentina Mar del Plata
- 2010 Budapest, Koller Gallery
- 2011: Kecskemét, Cifrapalota
- 2012: Győr, Esterházy-palota
- 2013: Moscow, Sberbank Gallery
- 2013: Brescia, Galleria dell'Incisione
- 2014: Jyväskylä, Galleria Ratamo
- 2013–2014: Ankara, Güler Sanat Gallery
- 2017: Badacsony, Egry József Múzeum

== Films ==
- 1977 "Silence"
- 1978 "Towards to the Salt Celler"
- 1980 "Private Nightmare"
- 1984 Ah, Amerika! ("Ah, America!")
- 1989 Vigyázat lépcső! ("Mind the Steps!")
- 1993 "The Garden"
- 1995 "Cry!"
- 2001 "Black Hole - White Hole"
- 2004 Az idő látképei ("Time Sights") on YouTube
- 2008 Útvesztők ("Mazes")
- 2010 Sakk! (Chess!)
- 2014 A rajzoló (The Drawer)

== Awards ==
- 1985 Best Script (shared with Ferenc Dániel) for Ah, Amerika! ("Ah, America!") at the 1st KAFF Animated Film Festival, Kecskemét.
- 1990 Gold Medal at the Biennial of Graphic Design, Brno
- 1991 First Prize at the International Poster Biennial, Lahti
- 1991 Main Prize of "Mediawave" Film Festival, Győr
- 1993 Award for the Category of Short Films for Vigyázat lépcső! ("Beware of Steps!") at the 3rd KAFF Animated Film Festival, Kecskemét.
- 1994 Icograda-prize at the International Poster Show, Chaumont
- 2000 Creative Distinction Award of European Design Annual, Dublin
- 2001 Gold medal at the Annual Exhibition of Society of Illustrators, New York City
- 2005 Grand Prix and Award of Film and TV Critics (tied with Igor Lazin) for Az idő látképei ("Time Sights") at the 7th KAFF Animated Film Festival, Kecskemét.
- 2007 Pro Ludo Ring, Budapest
- 2007 Plakat Kunst Hof Ruettenscheid Prize, Essen
- 2009 Special Award for Best Visual Language (tied with Zoltán Szilágyi Varga) for Útvesztők ("Mazes") at the 9th KAFF Animated Film Festival, Kecskemét.
- 2011 Kossuth Award, Budapest

== Books ==
- ΟΥΤΙΣ - Orosz István. Balassi Kiadó, Budapest, 1994.
- István Orosz,.
- Vladislav Rostoka: István Orosz / Posters. Rabbit&Solution, Bratislava, 2002.
- Al Seckel: Masters of Deception Sterling Publishing Co. New York, 2004.
- Deep Down - István Orosz. Catalogue of the "Orosz bij Escher" exhibition, The Hague, 2004.
- Clouds for Polonius. Ernst Múzeum, Budapest, 2006.
- The Drawn Time (A lerajzolt idő), 2008.
- .
- . (Book excerpt)
- Chess in the Island (Sakkparti a szigeten), 2015
- A Rhino Remembered, 2016
- Time Sights (Az idő látképei), 2016.

== See also ==
- Utisz
- Anamorphosis
- Impossible objects
- Hidden faces
