= Dóra Keresztes =

Hungarian artist (born 1953)

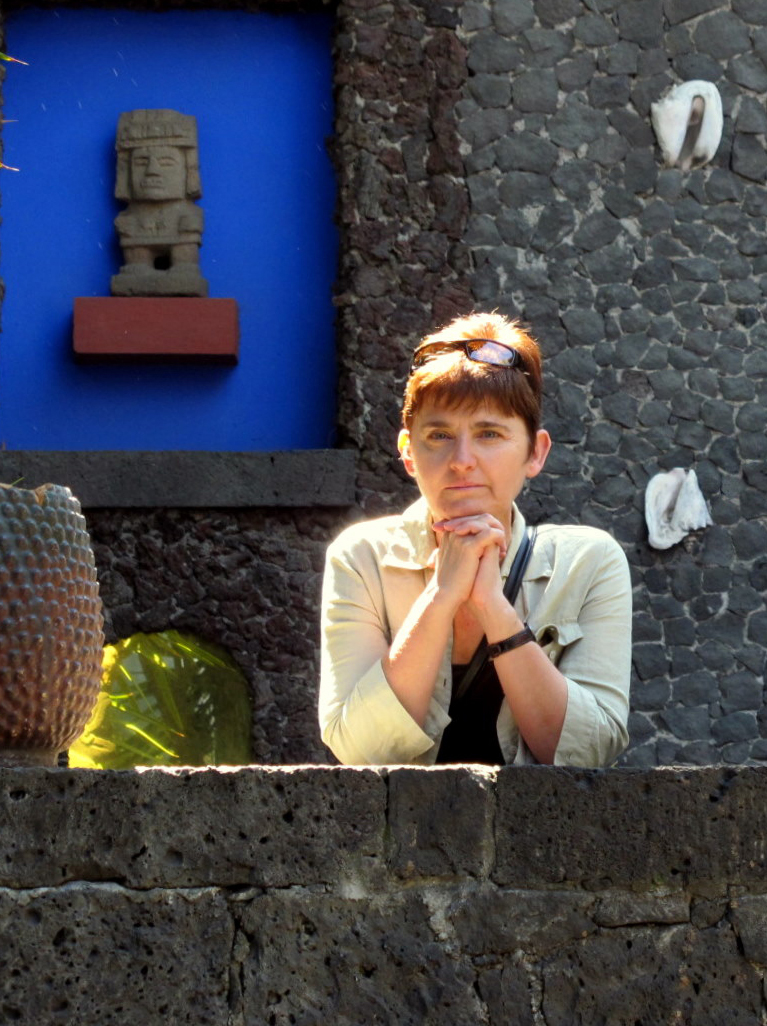
- Born: 3 October 1953 (age 72); Budapest, Hungary
- Education: Moholy-Nagy University of Art and Design

Dóra Keresztes (born 3 October 1953, Budapest) is a Hungarian painter, printmaker, illustrator, graphic designer and animated film director.

== Biography ==
She graduated from the Hungarian University of Arts And Design in Budapest as pupil of István Balogh, György Haiman, János Kass and Ernő Rubik. She started her career with book designs and illustrations mainly for children and contemporary Hungarian literature. Later on the film and theater posters came to the center of her interest and she was art director and designer of the „Muses” Cultural Magazine in Budapest. Beside her design activity she is an independent fine artist, stage designer and director of animated films. Her works have been shown in exhibitions, biennials and film festivals both in Hungary and abroad. Vice president of the Society of Hungarian Illustrators, film director in PannóniaFilm Studio, co-founder of Hungarian Poster Society. She works as a freelance designer in her own design studio.

== Exhibitions ==
- 1985 Budapest, Vigadó Gallery
- 2000 Szeged, Kass Gallery
- 2001 Teheran, Artist Gallery
- 2005 Budapest, Dorottya Gallery
- 2005 Budapest, Hungarian National Theatre
- 2009 Budapest, Barabas Villa
- 2012 Moscow, State Children's Library
- 2012 Győr, Esterhazy Palace
- 2014 Hiroshima, Aster Plaza

== Animated films ==
- 1979 – Moon Film (Holdasfilm) (with István Orosz)
- 1985 – Magic (Garabonciák) (with István Orosz)
- 1989 – Golden Bird (Aranymadár)
- 1996 – Faces (Arcok)
- 2001 – Smiling Sad Willow Tree (Mosolygó szomorúfűz)
- 2002 – De profundis
- 2005 – One-Two-Three (Egyedem-begyedem)

== Stage design ==
- 2003 – Sándor Weöres: The Shipman on the Moon (Holdbeli csónakos) (Hungarian National Theatre)

== Awards ==
- 1977-2001: Main Prizes of the Beautiful Hungarian Book Competition (nine times)
- 1988: Award of the Biennial of Graphic Design, Brno
- 1994: The International Board on Books for Young People (IBBY) Award
- 2000: Gold Medal of the Millennium Competition of Hungarian Art Academy
- 2001: The International Board on Books for Young People (IBBY) Award
