= Kecskemét Animation Film Festival =

Film festival

Kecskemét Animation Film Festival (Hungarian: Kecskeméti Animációs Filmfesztivál) (KAFF) is an animated film festival held biennially during the month of June in Kecskemét, Hungary. Although the bulk of the festival is oriented toward efforts in Hungarian animation, the associated KAFF-sponsored Festival of European Animated Feature Films and TV Specials (Hungarian: Európai Animációs Játékfilm Fesztivál) has opened the festival to international works as well. The festival was first held in 1985 and was opened to international works of animation in 1996.

== History ==
The history of Hungarian animation has been tied to the city of Kecskemét since 1971 when the Budapest-based state-run monopoly, Pannónia Film Studio, was granted the right to form a subsidiary studio named Kecskeméti Animációs Filmstúdió. For the next two decades Hungarian animation would be produced exclusively in these two cities as well as at a smaller affiliated studio located in Pécs. When state funding evaporated in 1990 and the Pannónia animation monopoly came to an end, the former state-run animation studios found themselves in prime position to become independent commercial entities and in 1991 Kecskeméti Animációs Filmstúdió became Kecskemétfilm Kft under the leadership of Ferenc Mikulás.

The first Kecskemét Animation Film Festival was held in 1985 during the peak of Hungarian animation efforts. The festival was initially intended as a tri-annual event that would highlight the most notable works of Hungarian animators. Between 1985 and 2005 the event followed this timetable with the only exception being that the festival scheduled for 1991 suffered organization problems related to the fall of Communism in the country and the establishment of the Third Republic, and so the 1991 festival was rescheduled for 1993. From 2005 onward, however, the festival has occurred biennially. In addition, while the main KAFF event remains focused on the works of Hungarian animators, the festival expanded in 1996 to simultaneously coordinate an affiliated event, the Festival of European Animated Feature Films and TV Specials (also known as the International Festival of Animated Feature Films and TV Specials). The two festivals are part of the same event and are considered synonymous.

== Jury members ==
Each festival has two kinds of juries. The preselection jury consists of 3 people who screen the possible submissions to come up with the initial quality lineup for the festival. The selection jury consists of a 3 to 5 person team who are charged with determining which of these films is to be awarded prizes. Since the 5th International Festival of Animated Feature Films and TV Specials in 2007, a separate set of jurymen (including 3 preselection and 3-5 regular jury) have been used to select films and award prizes for the international portion of the event. Appointment of all jury members is done by KAFF staff and until 2005 both juries may have had a president/chairperson. This position was usually given to guests as a form of high honor. Since the 4th KAFF in 1996, the composition of the jury has been decidedly international with guests since then hailing from Russia, Japan, Canada, USA, South Korea, and over a dozen other countries from all over Europe.

Former jury presidents/chairpeople have included:

- Sándor Féjja - 1985 Chairman of the KAFF Preselection Jury
- István Nemeskürty - 1985 Chairman of the KAFF Selection Jury
- József Veress - 1988 and 1996 Chairman of the KAFF Preselection Jury
- John Halas - 1988 Chairman of the KAFF Selection Jury
- Giannalberto Bendazzi - 1993 and 1999 Chairman of the KAFF Selection Jury
- Yuriy Norshteyn - 1996 Chairman of the KAFF Selection Jury
- Sándor Buglya - 1999 Chairman of the KAFF Preselection Jury
- Priit Pärn - 2002 Chairman of the KAFF Selection Jury

== Prizes awarded ==
KAFF and Festival of European Animated Feature Films and TV Specials prizes are generally of 2 types—Special Awards and Category Awards. Top Prizes are also awarded as well as Memorial Awards and a variety of other miscellaneous prizes. For top prizes, recipients may also be entitled to monetary prizes. The number of prizes awarded has gradually risen from 11 prizes in 1985 to over 25 in the late 2000s. Commonly awarded prizes include:

- Top Prizes
  - Kecskemét City Award - Awarded every year since it was initiated in 1988. The Kecskemét City Award began as one of KAFF's two top prizes (awarded only to Hungarian films), but it was shifted to the Festival of European Animated Feature Films and TV Specials in 1999 where it has since become the top international prize.
  - Grand Prix - Awarded every year since it was initiated in 1993. The Grand Prix is KAFF's top prize (awarded only to Hungarian films).
  - 1st Prize - Awarded in the Festival of European Animated Feature Films and TV Specials in 1996 and 1999. Lower tier 2nd and 3rd Prizes were also available in these years.
- Category Awards
  - Best Short Film - Awarded every year since 1985.
  - Best TV Series - Awarded every year since 1985.
  - Best Animated Feature Film - Awarded every year since 1985 except in 1988, 1993, and 1996. This award began as a KAFF award but was shifted to the Festival of European Animated Feature Films and TV Specials in 2002.
  - Best Commercial/Promotional Film/Applied Animation - Awarded every year since it was initiated in 1999.
  - Best TV Special - Awarded twice as a KAFF award in 1985 and 2005, and shifted to the Festival of European Animated Feature Films and TV Specials in 2002 where it has been awarded every year except 2009.
- Special Awards
  - Adult Audience Award - Awarded every year since 1985.
  - Best Music - Awarded every year since it was initiated in 1988.
  - Best First Film - Awarded every year since 1985 except in 2011.
  - Film and TV Critics' Award - Awarded every year since it was initiated in 1993.
  - Best Animation - Awarded every year since 1985 except in 1996 and 2002.
  - Best Script - Awarded every year since 1985 except in 1988, 1993, and 2002.
  - Children's Jury/Audience Award - Awarded every year since 1985 except in 1988, 1993, and 2002.
  - Local Kecskemét Television Audience Award - Awarded every year since it was initiated in 1996 except in 1999.
  - Best Visual Language - Awarded every year since it was initiated in 1993 except in 2002 and 2011.
  - Jury's Diploma of Merit - Awarded every year since it was initiated in 1988 except 1999, 2009, and 2011.
  - Organising Committee's Award for Life's Work - Awarded every year since it was initiated in 2002.
  - Best Experimental Film - Awarded in 1988, 2002, 2005, 2007, and 2009.
- Other Awards
  - Academic topic awards have repeatedly been awarded including the Popular Science Award (1985), Best Literary Work (1988), Best Cultural History (1993), Most Poetic Animated Film (2005), and Best Animated Documentary Film (2005).
  - Student filmmaker awards have been awarded including Best Diploma Film (2007, 2009, and 2011) and the Students' Jury Award (2009 and 2011).
  - Technical awards have included Best Graphic Design (1988), Best 3D (2002, 2005, and 2011), and Best Editing (2011).
  - Genre awards have included Best Amateur Film (1985), Best Children's Film (1996), Best Humorous Animated Film (2005), and Best Music Video (2011).
  - Numerous memorial awards have also been a mainstay at KAFF events starting with the Pesti Műsor Award (1993) and continuing nearly every year afterward. Rarely awarded more than one year in a row, a few exceptions include the Art Cinema Society Award offered in 2007 and 2009, and the KAFF-SZAFT Award sponsored by the Meeting of Free Animation Filmmakers who gave three memorial awards in 2009 and another three in 2011.

=== Top prize winners ===
==== KAFF Grand Prix (Hungarian) ====
Year	Title	Director(s)
1985	No Grand Prix awarded.	
1988	No Grand Prix awarded.	
1993	Locsolkodás ("Sprinkling")	Béla Weisz
1996	Ecotópia	Sándor Reisenbüchler
1999	Labirintus ("Labyrinth")	Ferenc Cakó
2002	A kalózok szeretője ("The Lover of Pirates")	Zsófia Péterffy
2005	Az idő látképei ("Time Sights")	István Orosz
2007	Életvonal ("Life Line")	Ducki Tomek
2009	FIN	Katalin Glaser
2011	track32	István Illés
2013	My Name is Boffer Bings	László Csáki
2015	Baths	Ducki Tomek
2017	Bond	Judit Wunder
2023	Four Souls of Coyote	Áron Gauder

==== 1st Prize (International) ====
Year	Title	Director(s)	Country
1996	The Secret Adventures of Tom Thumb	Dave Borthwick	United Kingdom
1999	Tagasi Euroopasse ("Back to Europe")	Riho Unt	Estonia
2002–2015	No 1st Prize awarded.		

==== Kecskemét City Prize ====
Year	Title	Director(s)	Country
1985	No Kecskemét City Prize awarded.		
1988	Isten Veled, Kis Sziget! ("Farewell, Little Island")	Sándor Reisenbüchler	Hungary
1993	Allegro vivace	Sándor Reisenbüchler	Hungary
1996	Hamu ("Ashes")	Ferenc Cakó	Hungary
Kecskemét City Prize shifts to the Európai Animációs Játékfilm Fesztivál.
1999	Kirikou et la sorcière ("Kirikou and the Sorceress")	Michel Ocelot	France
2002	Don Quixote	Csaba Varga	Hungary
2005	Nyócker ("The District")	Áron Gauder	Hungary
2007	Bland Tistlar ("Among the Thorns")	Uzi Geffenblad & Lotta Geffenblad	Sweden
2009	The Secret of Kells	Tomm Moore	Ireland
2011	Na půdě aneb Kdo má dneska narozeniny? ("In the Attic: Who Has a Birthday Today?")	Jiří Barta	Czech Republic
2013	Arrugas ("Wrinkles")	Ignacio Ferreras	Spain
2015	Rocks in My Pockets	Signe Baumane	Latvia
2017	The Red Turtle	Michael Dudok de Wit	Belgium

== See also ==
- List of animation awards
