= Ferenc Cakó =

Hungarian animator

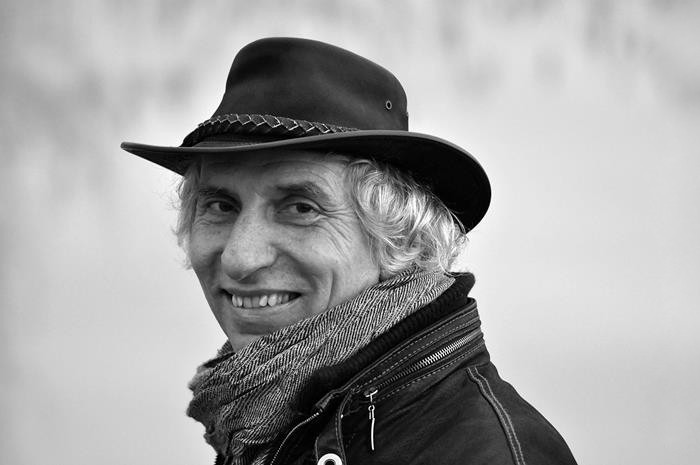
Photo by Gáspár Stekovics

Ferenc Cakó (born 1950) is a Hungarian artist whose specialty is performing sand animation.

He graduated from the College for Creative Arts in 1973 and did amateur animation at that point. His first success was in 1982 and in 1989 he was named artist of the Hungarian People's Republic. After that he did workshops in Finland, France, Spain, Belgium, and Portugal.

Amongst his more recent performances, Ferenc Cakó performed in IIT Bombay, Mumbai, India at Techfest 2004. His show in the Open Air Theatre was a huge hit with thousands of students, professors and visitors attending it.

Cakó's films have won prizes including the award for best short film at the Berlin International Film Festival, the jury prize for short film at the Cannes Film Festival, and numerous awards at the Kecskemét Animation Film Festival.

== Filmography ==
- Hamu ("Ashes") (1996) - Winner of KAFF's 1996 Kecskemét City Award. and the Short Film Golden Bear
- Labirintus ("Labyrinth") (1999) - Winner of the 1999 KAFF Grand Prix.
- A Négy évszak ("The Four Seasons") (2000)
- Kövek ("Stones") (2001)
- Animal Planet Sand Promos (2003)
- A róka és a holló ("The Fox and the Raven") (2005) - Winner of the 2005 KAFF Award for Best Humorous Animated Film.
- Arc ("Face") (2009) - Winner of the 2009 KAFF Award of the Students' Jury.
