= Sándor Reisenbüchler =

Hungarian film director (1935–2004)

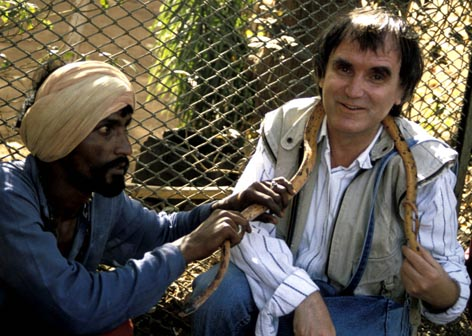
Reisenbüchler (right) in 1992

Sándor Reisenbüchler (February 16, 1935, Budapest – April 1, 2004, Budapest) was a Hungarian animated film director and graphic artist.

He took a degree in directing of films from the Academy of Theatre and Film Arts in Budapest. He was working for PannóniaFilm in Budapest since 1965. Folk tales, fantastic and ecological themes had a particular appeal to him; he was a self-taught graphic artist with pop-art influences. A unique figure on the Hungarian Art Scene, he was given the highest national prize for his achievements: the Kossuth Award.

== Films ==
- 1968 Kidnapping of the Sun and the Moon
- 1972 The Year of 1812
- 1975 Moon Flight
- 1978 Panic
- 1983 A Peacemaking Expedition
- 1987 Isten Veled, Kis Sziget! ("Farewell, Little Island")
- 1990 Allegro vivace
- 1992 Green Warnings For Every Day
- 1995 Ecotópia
- 1999 Boldog világvége ("Merry Apocalypse")
- 2002 The Advent of Light

== Awards ==
- 1970 Mamaia — Golden Pelican
- 1973 Giffoni — Silver Cup
- 1974 New York — Special Prize of the Jury
- 1973 Cannes — Special Prize
- 1974 London — Among the best films of the years
- 1983 Rome — The best film
- 1984 Budapest — Jules Verne Prize
- 1988 Espinho — Category I. Prize
- 1988 Kecskemét — KAFF's Kecskemét City Award for Isten Veled, Kis Sziget! ("Farewell, Little Island")
- 1989 Lille — The best short film
- 1989 Annecy — Prize of the Journalists
- 1993 Kecskemét — KAFF's Kecskemét City Award for Allegro vivace
- 1996 Kecskemét — KAFF's Grand Prix for Ecotópia
- 1997 Cairo — Silver Cairo
- 1999 Kecskemét — KAFF's Best Soundtrack for Boldog világvége ("Merry Apocalyps")
- 2002 Kecskemét — KAFF's The Foundation of Animated Film Art's Life's Achievements Award
