= Zoltán Szilágyi Varga =

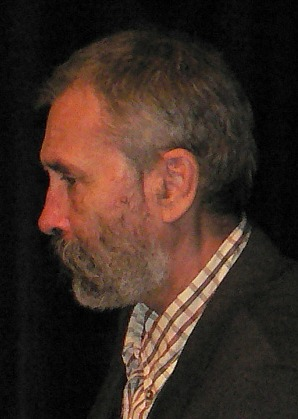
Zoltán Szilágyi Varga in 2015

Zoltán Szilágyi Varga (born 23 June 1951) is a Hungarian graphic artist and animation director. He has received Béla Balázs Prize for his work, and has been honored at five separate Kecskemét Animation Film Festivals (KAFF), winning two memorial awards as well as prizes for Best Animation, Best Visual Language, and Best Script twice each.

== Works ==
Some of Szilágyi Varga's more notable works include:

- Éjszakai Kultúrtörténeti Hadgyakorlat ("Culturhistorical Manoeuvre at Night") – Winner of the 1993 KAFF Award for Best Visual Language.
- Utazás a föld középppontja felé ("Journey to the Centre of the Earth") – Winner of the 2002 KAFF-Sponsored Cambridge Animation Systems and Leonardo SNS Software Prize for High Use of Applied Technology.
- A világlátott egérke ("The Widely Travelled Little Mouse") – Varga was honored 4 times at KAFF events in 2005, 2007, 2009, and 2011 for specific episodes alongside Lajos Nagy and Sándor Kányádi (once in 2005).
  - "A rokoni pártfogás" ("The Patronage of Relative") - An episode winning the 2005 KAFF Award for Best Script.
  - "Vonaton ringatózva" ("Rocking on a Train") – An episode winning the 2007 KAFF Award for Best Animation.
  - "Szabadulás a szolgaságból" ("Escape from Slavery") – An episode winning the 2009 KAFF Award for Best Animation.
  - "Az óriások fogságában" ("Taken by the Giants") – An episode winning the 2011 KAFF Award for Best Animation.
- Jegyzőkönyv ("Court Record") – Varga was honored at the 2007 KAFF for a specific episode.
  - "Mansfeld Péter emlékére" ("In Memoriam Peter Mansfeld") – An episode winning the 2007 KAFF Award for Best Script.
- Koan - Szilágyi Varga was honored at the 2009 KAFF for a specific episode.
  - "A túlsó part" ("The Other Side") – An episode winning the 2009 KAFF Award from the Art Cinema Association.
