= Rudolf Pap =

- Born: November 16, 1991 (age 34); Budapest, Hungary
- Genres: 2D, comics
- Occupations: animator, model, painter
- Years active: 2009–present
- Website: rudolfpap.blogspot.com

Rudolf Pap (born 16 November 1991) is a Hungarian-born award-winning animator and model.

He was born in Budapest, Hungary, in 1991 and he is most famous about his exceptional skills in 2D animation. He was discovered in 2009 when he won an international competition held by Australian singer Kylie Minogue.

== Discovery and childhood ==
He was born 16 November in Budapest as an only child. He was raised in Érd. He began to draw very early - his biggest inspirations were Disney films, Andersen paintings, anime, fashion and famous artists like Walt Disney, Hayao Miyazaki and Gábor Csupó. Then he started to try to do animations when he was 10 - inspired by Sailor Moon and Dragon Ball. During this time he developed his skills both as an animator and background painter into professional level although he never attended any art school - he taught himself only from books. He both writes and creates his products.

== Competition winning and international career beginnings ==
In early 2009, Pap decided to make his first own cartoon, but because he wouldn't be able to dub it he decided to create a music video. He started to work on the video for "Speakerphone", then he sent a 20 second long preview to the singer's management. Soon after that an international competition was announced by Kylie Minogue for her "Speakerphone" track. Pap finished his video and submitted along with a lot of other submissions internationally but in the end he won the contest with his first work and at the age of 19. On 4 October his music video premiered in Hollywood before Minogue's concert in the Bowl. The video can be seen on her official website. In 2014 he entered to several Film festivals with his first short film, 'Closer the Animation', which is available from 20 May at the same year.

=== Media attention ===
After the premier in Hollywood, the Hungarian media discovered that a Hungarian contestant had won - then the next few weeks Rudolf Pap was the main new in several magazines and television programs.

Next to the big attention, Pap received a lot of offers for music videos both from Hungary and internationally. He told in an interview on Viva TV he already picked the two best offers - one from Hungary and one from Russia. In mid October he was invited to Kecskemét (the Hungarian basis of animation) to premier his video first in Hungary in a local cinema. To bring something new to this event, Pap created a short film - a crossover with the characters of his two biggest inspirations - Sailor Moon and Dragon Ball. The short film called Cross Tale and its trailer were shown on the Hungarian MTV on October - after that, Pap got an offer for dubbing if he would make a decent cartoon from Cross Tale. Because of this Pap converted the short film into a teaser trailer - to not reveal the story of Cross Tale. According to this trailer, he will make an OVA and it will premiere in 2010. In the August issue of AS Magazine there was an interview with him, where he said that he has some difficulties with the rights, so the progress of the project is slowed down.

In 2011 he won the "Most Anticipated New Artist" award at the Swiss Animation Awards.

== Other projects ==
Next to being an animator he is a university student and has been a model for 2 years. He was discovered in 2009 by his agent in a restaurant while he was with one of his friends. Since then he signed to Visage Models and working internationally. He was the cover model for the 2010 fashion exhibition "Face killed the reality" in Prague and featured in the May issue of In Style Magazine. At the end of 2010 he was featured in various international editorials and was one of the face of Hungarian label, Poster Urban Outfit FW2010. According to some of his interviews and his DeviantArt account he is making a comics series called "Snow Petals" - The first chapter was released on 28 May in Animestars Magazine, followed by the second in August. Currently he is searching for publishers internationally.
