= János Kass =

Hungarian artist (1927–2010)

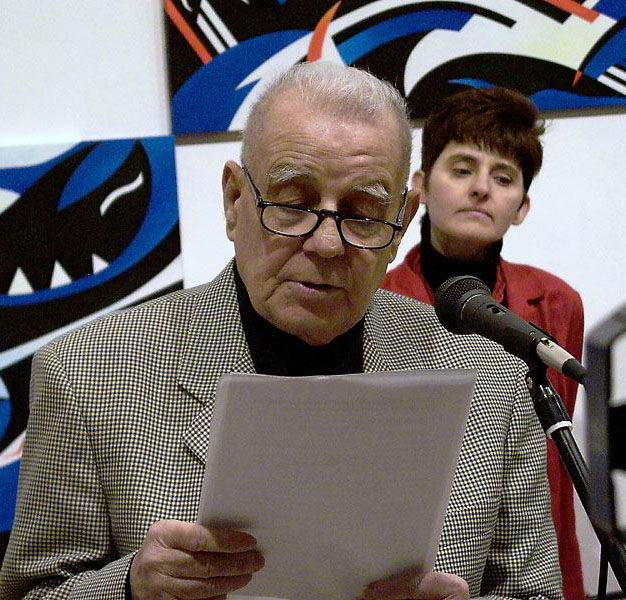
Kass opens in 2005 the art exhibition of Dóra Keresztes

János Kass (December 26, 1927 – March 29, 2010) was a Hungarian illustrator, printmaker, graphic designer, postage stamp designer, animated film director and teacher. Born in Szeged, he was the storyboard artist for the first fully digital animated film and died March 29 in Budapest.

== Career ==
Beginning his artistic studies at the Applied Art Academy, Kass finished in 1951 at the Academy of Fine Arts, a student of Gyula Hincz, György Kádár and György Konecsni. From 1956 to 1959 he held the Derkovits scholarship.

From 1961 to 1962, he was assistant professor at the Book-Art Academy in Leipzig, Germany.

Kass regularly took part in every major national exhibition at home and abroad. He had one-man shows in Italy (1963), Australia (1970) and Switzerland (1976). He participated in the Venice Biennial (1960), the Youth Biennial in Paris (1961), and Biennials in Lugano, Tokyo, Ljubljana, São Paulo and Buenos Aires, along with "Intergrafik" exhibitions in Berlin.

He made many friends within the British graphic art fraternity while spending some months in London during 1980, working on one of the earliest, fully digitised computer-animated films, Dilemma, with John Halas. He had already won recognition with his illustrations and book designs. At the 1973 Leipzig Book Fair, his work was awarded the title of best illustrated book at the fair. This accolade was repeated at the Frankfurt Book Fair in 1999.

The 11-minute Dilemma was nominated at that year's Cannes Film Festival for the Golden Palm for Best Short Film, and is considered the first fully digital animated film. Kass was also a background artist for the So Beautiful and So Dangerous segment of Ivan Reitman Productions' 1981 animated feature film Heavy Metal.

Kass' drawings, etchings and silk-screen prints were exhibited in the Fitzwilliam Museum in Cambridge in 1989 and in 1990 at London Olympia. He later held a one-man show in Edinburgh.

== Personal life ==
Eszter Kass, his daughter from a first marriage to the artist Gabriella Hajnal, also became an artist. His second wife, Vera Bánki, is a translator of English historical studies. They survive him.
