= List of Hungarians =

This is a list of Hungarians notable within Hungary and/or abroad. It includes notable Hungarians born outside present-day Hungary.

== Artists ==
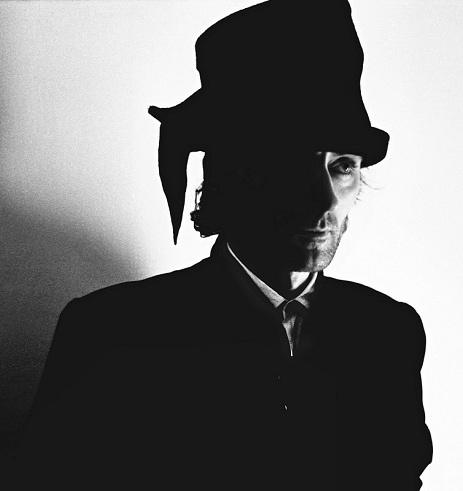
Fashion designer Tamás Király

- Gyula Aggházy
- Károly Antal
- Franz Liszt
- Miklós Borsos
- Sándor Bortnyik
- Francois Colos
- Tivadar Csontváry Kosztka
- Gyula Czimra
- Gyula Donáth
- Orshi Drozdik
- János Fadrusz
- Béni Ferenczy
- István Ferenczy
- Arpad Feszty
- Simon Hantaï
- János Horvay
- László Hudec
- Miklós Izsó
- Zoltán Joó
- Ede Kallós
- Julian von Károlyi
- André Kertész
- Lajos Kozma, architect and critic
- Susan Kozma-Orlay, designer in Australia
- Tamás Király, avant-garde fashion designer
- Zsigmond Kisfaludi Stróbl
- Márta Lacza
- Paul László
- Philip de László
- Miklós Ligeti
- Imre Makovecz
- János Major
- Zsuzsa Máthé
- David Merlini
- László Moholy-Nagy
- István Orosz
- János Pásztor
- József Róna
- Albert Schickedanz
- Henriett Seth-F.
- Amrita Sher-Gil
- Pal Szinyei Merse
- László Szlávics, Jr.
- Adam Szentpétery
- Mór Than
- János Tornyai
- Lajos Vajda
- Victor Vasarely
- János Vaszary
- Nándor Wagner

== Business professionals ==
- Lea Gottlieb (1918–2012), Israeli fashion designer and founder of Gottex
- Andrew Grove, pioneer in the semiconductor industry; a chairman and CEO of Intel
- Éva Hegedüs (1957–), Chairman-CEO and majority shareholder of Gránit Bank
- Radovan Jelašić, governor of the National Bank of Serbia
- Sándor Kenyeres (1949–), international business magnate, and scientific philanthropist
- Peter Munk, Canadian-Hungarian entrepreneur, founder of Barrick Gold, and philanthropist
- Tibor Rosenbaum, businessman
- George Soros, Hungarian-American business magnate, investor, philosopher and philanthropist

== Composers and performers ==
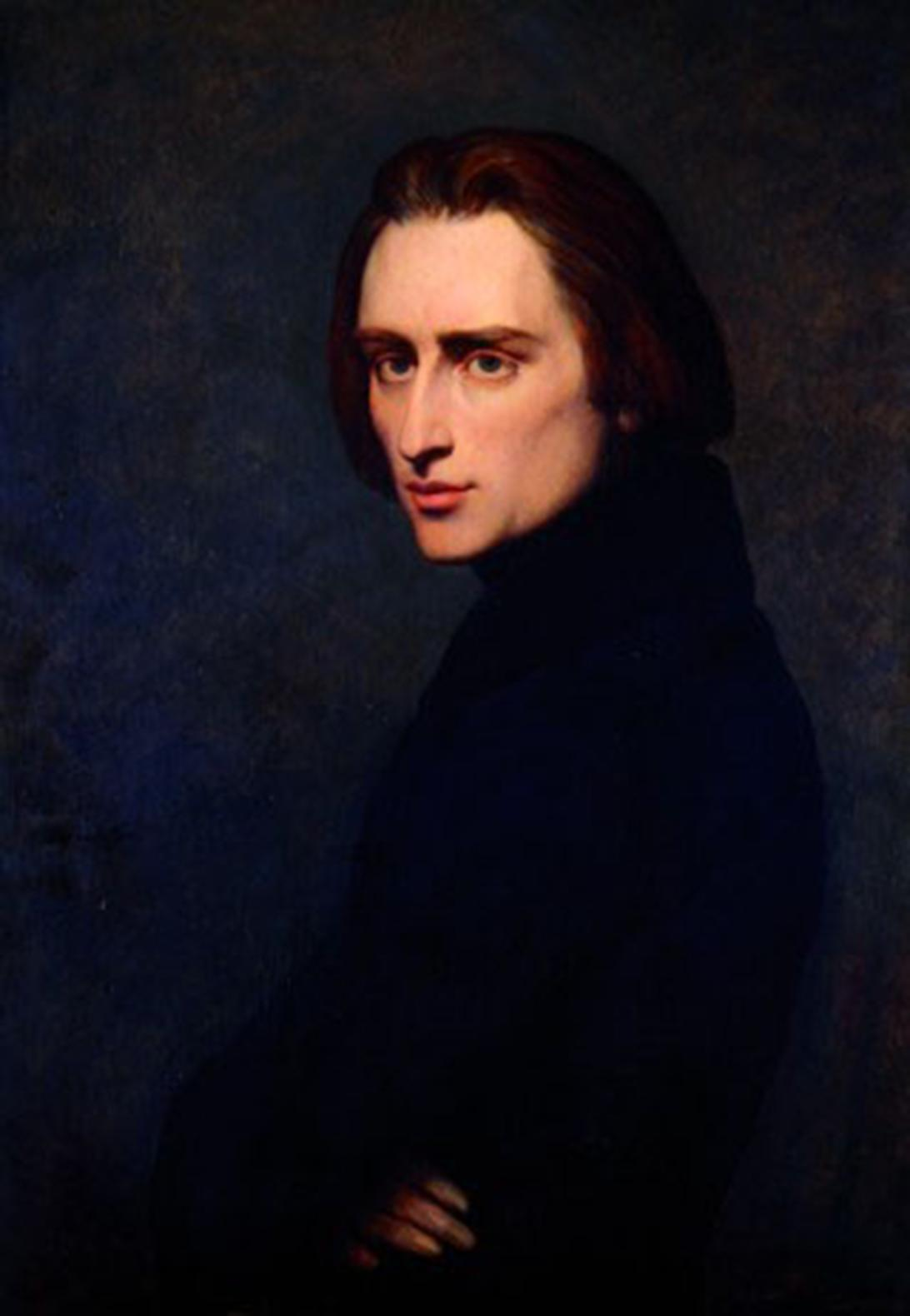
Liszt

- Bálint Bakfark, composer
- Kristóf Baráti, violinist
- Béla Bartók, composer and pianist
- János Bihari, violinist
- Gergely Bogányi, pianist
- Attila Csihar, vocalist
- György Cziffra, pianist and composer
- Ernő Dohnányi (Ernst von Dohnanyi), composer, pianist and conductor
- Antal Doráti, conductor
- Péter Eötvös, composer and conductor
- Ferenc Erkel, composer
- László Fassang, organist and pianist
- Iván Fischer, conductor and composer
- Peter Frankl, pianist
- Endre Granat, violinist
- Zoltán Jeney, composer
- Joseph Joachim, violinist
- Pál Kadosa, composer
- Zoltán Kocsis, pianist and conductor
- Zoltán Kodály, composer
- Rezső Kókai, composer
- György Kurtág, composer
- Franz Lehár, composer
- György Ligeti, composer
- Franz Liszt, composer and pianist
- Éva Marton, soprano
- Ilona Náday, singer
- János Négyesy, violinist
- Ervin Nyiregyházi, pianist
- Eugene Ormandy, conductor
- Veronika Harcsa, vocalist
- György Pauk, violinist
- László Polgár, bass
- Fritz Reiner, conductor
- Eduard Reményi, violinist
- Rezső Seress, composer and pianist
- Georg Solti, conductor
- Gábor Szabó, guitarist
- Georg Szell, conductor
- Júlia Várady, soprano
- Ibolya Verebics, soprano
- László Vidovszky, composer
- Andras Schiff, pianist

== Film artists ==
- Cicciolina
- Michael Curtiz
- Attila Dargay
- Eva Gabor
- Zsa Zsa Gabor
- John Garfield
- Mariska Hargitay
- Martin Helstáb
- Harry Houdini
- Miklós Jancsó
- Gyula Kabos
- Lajos Koltai
- Róbert Koltai
- Sir Alexander Korda
- László Kovács
- Peter Lorre
- Jon Lovitz (of Hungarian descent)
- Béla Lugosi
- Paul Lukas
- Károly Makk
- László Nemes
- George Pal
- Gabriel Pascal
- Gábor Reviczky
- Ferenc Rofusz
- István Szabó
- Béla Tarr
- Andrew G. Vajna
- Johnny Weissmuller
- Vilmos Zsigmond

== History and politics ==
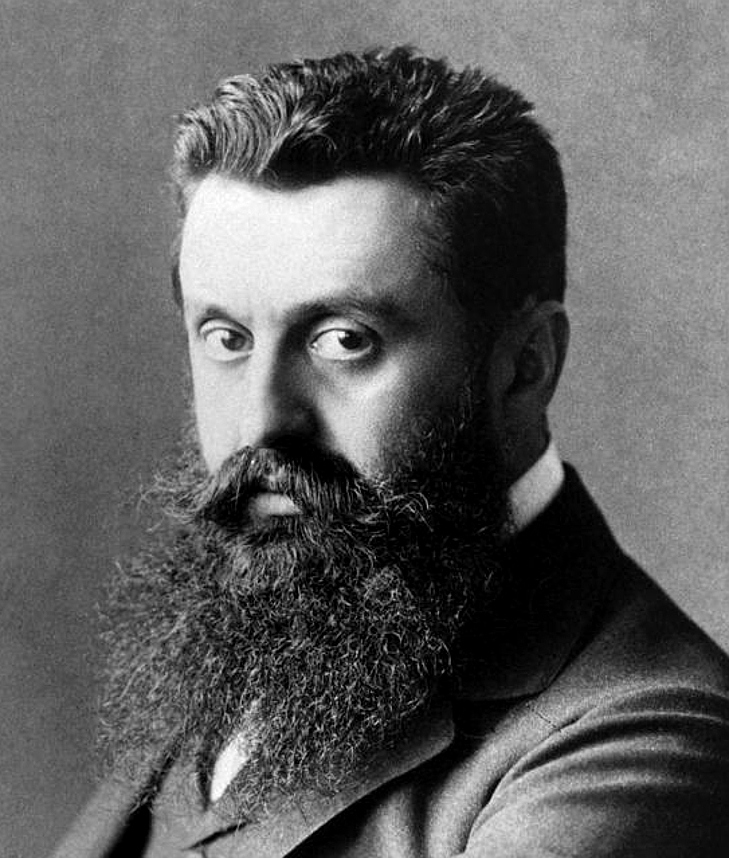
Theodor Herzl

- Péter Magyar (born 1981), current Prime Minister of Hungary (2026-present)
- László Almásy (1895–1951), desert explorer, author, the inspiration for the fictionalised character of Almásy in Michael Ondaatje's 1992 novel The English Patient
- Gyula Andrássy (1823–1890), statesman
- József Antall (1932–1993), Prime Minister of Hungary (1990–1993)
- Albert Apponyi (1846–1933), statesman
- Gordon Bajnai (born 1968), former Prime Minister of Hungary (2009–2010)
- Tamás Bakócz (1442–1521), archbishop, cardinal and statesman
- Gábor Baross (1848–1892), statesman
- Erzsébet Báthory (1560–1614), countess
  - István Báthory (1477–1534), Governor of Transylvania
  - István (Stephen) Báthory (1533–1586), Prince of Transylvania and King of Poland
- Zsigmond Báthory (1572–1613), Prince of Transylvania
- Vilma Beck (1810–1851), writer and freedom fighter
- Ödön Beöthy (1796–1854), Hungarian deputy and orator
- Béla Bugár (born 1958), politician
- Krisztina Csáky (1654–1723), Hungarian countess, resistance fighter
- Pál Csáky (born 1956), politician
- Aurél Dessewffy (1808–1842), journalist and politician
- Péter Doszpot (born 1962), former member of parliament
- Ignaz Aurelius Fessler (1756–1839), court councillor and minister to Alexander I of Russia
- Catharina Anna Grandon de Hochepied (1767–1803), noble and amateur actress
- András Hadik (1710–1790), count
- Theodor Herzl (Tivadar Herzl, 1860–1904), journalist, modern Zionism
- Miklós Horthy (1868–1957), admiral and regent (1920–1944)
- Stephen I of Hungary (Stephen I, Szent István, Stephanus Rex, I. István) (975–1038) first King of Hungary
- Friar Julian
- János Kádár (1912–1989), communist leader
- Charles I of Hungary (Károly Róbert) (1288–1342), King of Hungary (1308–1342)
- Mihály Károlyi (1875–1955), first President of Hungary (1919)
- Lajos Kossuth (1802–1894), Hungarian politician later Regent-President of Hungary
- Teddy Kollek (born Tivadar Kollek, 1911–2007), Israeli Mayor of Jerusalem
- Béla Kun (1886–1938), minister, revolutionist (1919)
- Louis I of Hungary (Louis I, Nagy Lajos, 1326–1382), king of Hungary (1342–1382)
- Tom Lantos (1928–2008), former U.S. Congressman from California
- Géza Malasits (1874–1948), deputy in parliament
- József Mindszenty (1892–1975), cardinal, imprisoned by communist government
- Imre Nagy (1896–1958), prime minister in 1953 and 1956
- Viktor Orbán (born 1963), former Prime Minister of Hungary (1998–2002, 2010–2026)
- Ágnes Osztolykán (born 1974), Hungarian politician and Romani activist
- Mátyás Rákosi (1892–1971), communist leader
- George Soros (György Soros, born 1930), stock investor, philanthropist, and political activist
- Ferenc Szálasi (1897–1946), head of Arrow Cross Party, Head of State, Prime Minister of Hungary (1944–1945)
- László Szalay (1813–1864), statesman and historian
- Count Széchenyi István (1791–1860)
- Istvan Tisza (1861–1918), Prime Minister of Hungary (1903–1905; 1913–1917)
- Toma András (Tamás András), Hungarian World War II prisoner found in Russian mental hospital and returned after 55 years
- László Tőkés (born 1952), Reformed Church pastor and an instigator of the Romanian Revolution of 1989
- Countess Anna Wesselényi (1584–1649), countess and writer
- Count Zrínyi Miklós (1508–1566), Hungarian general who held Szigetvár against the Ottoman Turks
- Count Zrínyi Miklós (1620–1664), Hungarian general, statesman and poet
- János Zsámboky, humanist

== Inventors ==
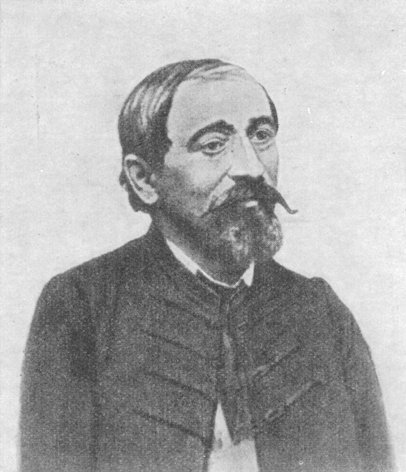
János Irinyi

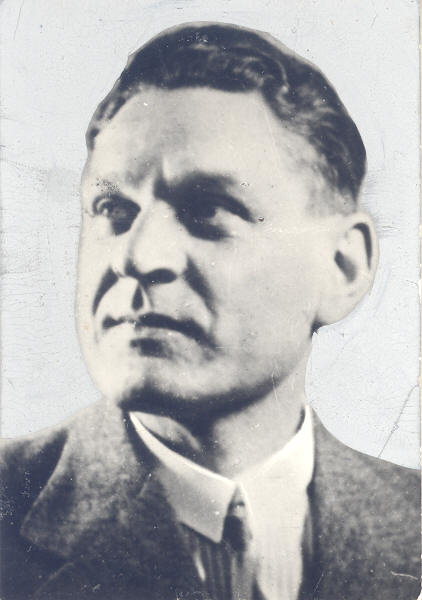
Oszkár Asbóth

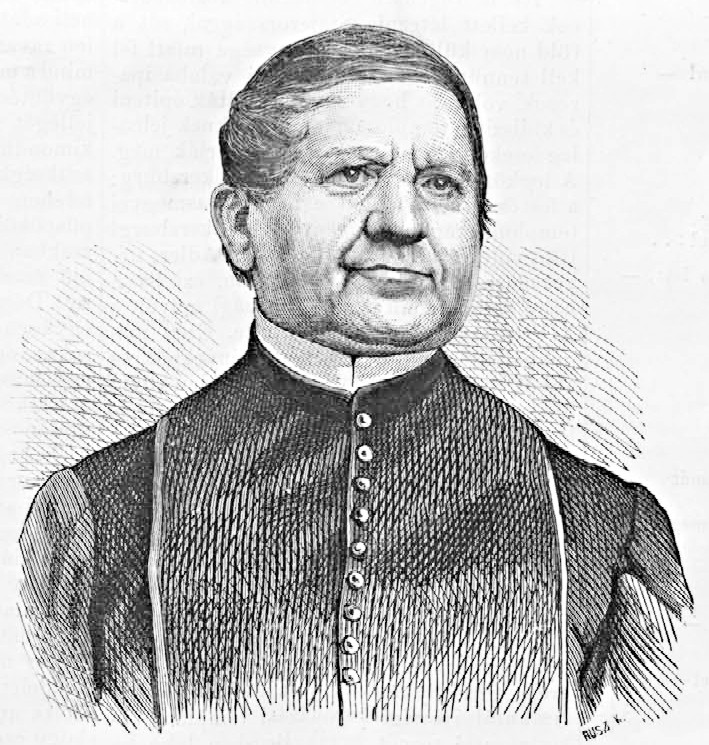
Ányos Jedlik

- Ferenc Anisits, inventor of the BMW diesel engine (1983)
- Oszkár Asbóth, inventor of the helicopter (1928)
- Donát Bánki, inventor of the cross-flow turbine
- Béla Barényi, inventor in the field of automobile safety
- László Bíró, inventor of the ballpoint pen (1931)
- Ottó Bláthy, inventor of the voltage regulator, co-inventor (with Miksa Déri and Károly Zipernowsky) of the transformer
- János Csonka, inventor of the carburetor
- Miksa Déri, co-inventor (with Ottó Bláthy and Károly Zipernowsky) of the transformer
- Dénes Gábor, inventor of holography (1947)
- József Galamb, creator of the Ford Model T (1908)
- Csaba Horváth, inventor of high-performance liquid chromatography
- János Irinyi, inventor of the noiseless match (1836)
- Ányos Jedlik, co-inventor of the dynamo (1861) and soda water (1826)
- Rudolf E. Kálmán, co-inventor of the Kalman filter
- Kálmán Kandó, pioneer in the development of railway electric traction
- Dénes Mihály, inventor in the field of television technology
- Joseph Petzval, mathematician, inventor, and physicist.
- Tivadar Puskás, inventor of the telephone exchange
- Ernő Rubik, inventor of the Rubik's Cube (1976)
- Kálmán Tihanyi, inventor of cathode-ray tubes, inventor of the first manless aircraft in Great Britain
- Károly Zipernowsky, co-inventor (with Ottó Bláthy and Miksa Déri) of the transformer

== Scientists ==
- Antal K. Bejczy (January 16, 1930 – June 25, 2015),a Hungarian scientist and a national of the United States known for his contributions to robotics.
- Avram Hershko (born 1937 as Herskó Ferenc), Hungarian-born Israeli biochemist and Nobel laureate in Chemistry (2004)
- András Arató, electrical engineer known for the Hide the Pain Harold meme
- Erzsébet Bajári (1912–1963)
- György Bálint (originally surname Braun; 1919–2020), Hungarian horticulturist, Candidate of Agricultural Sciences, journalist, author, and politician who served as an MP.
- Robert Bárány
- Zoltán Bay
- George von Békésy Nobel Prize
- Gergely Berzeviczy
- Farkas Bolyai
- János Bolyai
- Imre Bródy
- George de Hevesy
- Loránd Eötvös
- Paul Erdős
- Madeleine Barnothy Forro
- Dennis Gabor
- Lili Hajdú Gimesné
- Zoltan Hajos
- Máté Hidvégi
- Johann Baptiste Horvath
- Vilma Hugonnai
- János Kornai
- Géza Krepuska, ear, nose, and throat specialist
- Cornelius Lanczos
- George Andrew Olah
- Rózsa Péter
- Thomas Sebeok
- Pál Selényi
- Ignaz Semmelweis, physician and pioneer of antiseptic procedures
- Charles Simonyi (Karoly)
- Michael Somogyi
- Victor Szebehely
- Kinga Székely
- Albert Szent-Györgyi, discovered vitamin C (1932)
- Leó Szilárd
- Éva Tauszk
- Valentine Telegdi
- Mária Telkes
- Edward Teller
- Imre Trencsényi-Waldapfel
- Franz Nopcsa von Felso-Szilvas
- Georg von Békésy
- Theodore von Kármán
- John von Neumann
- Elizabeth Rona (1890–1981), nuclear chemist
- József Szabó de Szentmiklós
- Eugene Wigner
- Richard Adolf Zsigmondy

== Sports ==
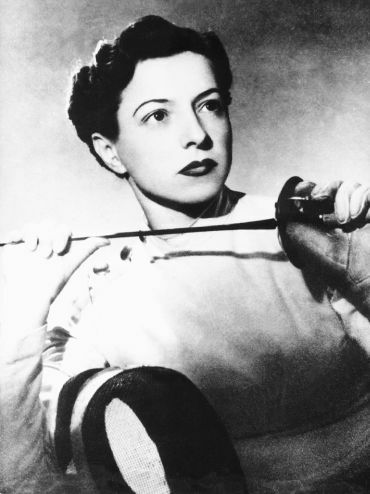
Ilona Elek

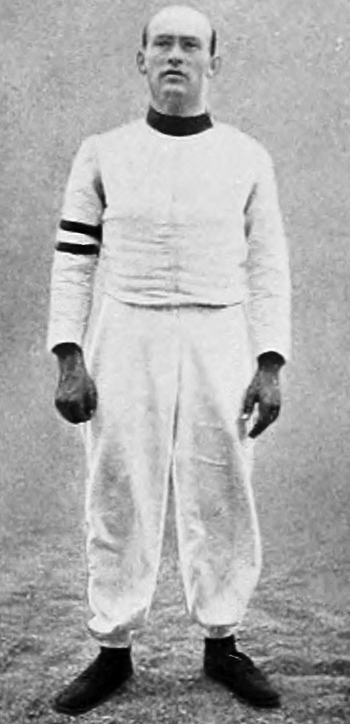
Jenö Fuchs

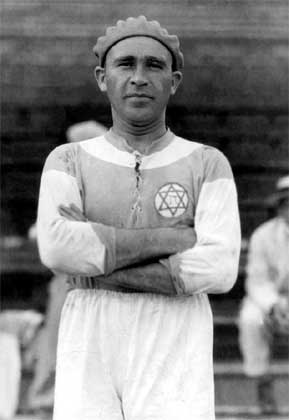
Béla Guttmann

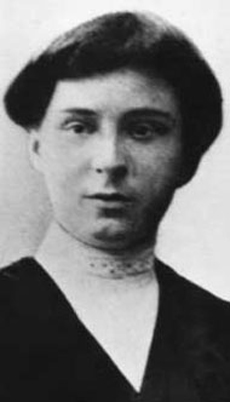
Lily Kronberger

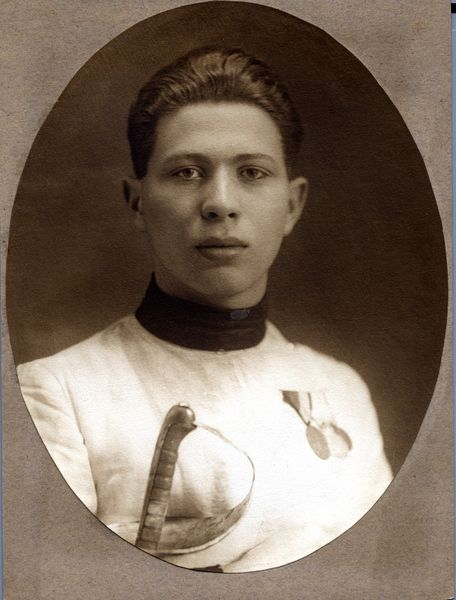
Attila Petschauer

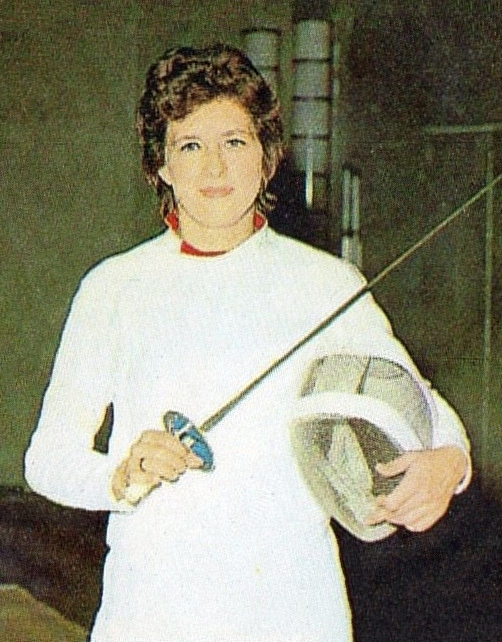
Ildikó Újlaky-Rejtő

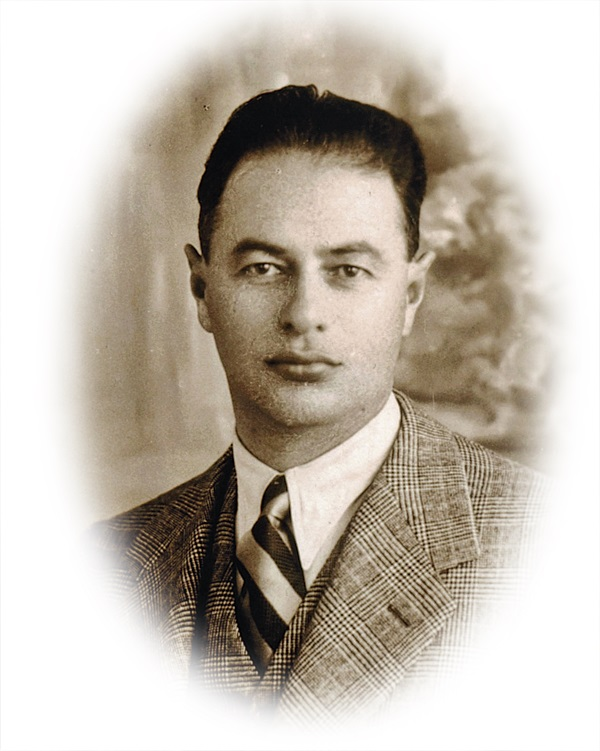
Árpád Weisz

- Robert Antal (1921–1995), Olympic champion water polo player
- Péter Bakonyi (born 1938), saber fencer, twice Olympic bronze
- Gedeon Barcza (1911–1986), chess player
- Viktor Barna (born Győző Braun) (1911–1972), 22-time world champion table tennis player, International Table Tennis Foundation Hall of Fame
- István Barta (1895–1948), water polo goalkeeper, Olympic champion at the 1932 Summer Olympics, silver at the 1928 Summer Olympics
- Zsolt Baumgartner (born 1981), Formula One racecar driver (2003–2004), Jordan-Ford (two races, subbing for injured Ralph Firman) (2003), Minardi-Cosworth (2004), all 18 Grand Prix, 1 point (United States Grand Prix in Indianapolis, Indiana)
- Laszlo Bellak (1911–2006), seven-time world champion table tennis player, ITTFHoF
- Tibor Benedek (1972-2020), water polo player, Olympic champion: 2000 Summer Olympics (Sydney), 2004 Summer Olympics (Athens), 2008 Summer Olympics (Beijing)
- Pál Benkő (1928–2019), chess player
- Gyula Bíró (1890–1961), midfield and forward footballer (national team)
- László Bita (born 1967), footballer
- Balázs Borbély (born 1979), footballer
- József Braun (also known as József Barna; 1901–1943), Olympic footballer
- Gyula Breyer (1894–1921), chess player
- György Bródy (1908–1967), water polo goalkeeper, two-time Olympic champion
- Ákos Buzsáky (born 1982), football player
- Ibolya Csák, winner of women's high jump at the 1936 Summer Olympics
- Zoltán Czibor (1929–1997), soccer player
- Tamás Darnyi, swimmer (four Olympic gold medals)
- Krisztina Egerszegi, swimmer (five Olympic gold medals)
- Ilona Elek (née "Schacherer"; 1907–1988), foil fencer (Olympic gold-medal winner, and world champion, both before and after World War II)
- Árpád Élő, (1903–1992), Hungarian-born American creator of the chess Elo rating system
- Zsolt Erdei, boxer, WBO light heavyweight world champion
- Sándor Erdős (born 1947), épée fencer, Olympic champion
- Dr. Dezső Földes (1880–1950), saber fencer, two-time Olympic champion
- Samu Fóti, Olympic silver (gymnastics team combined exercises)
- Dr. Jenő Fuchs (1882–1955), saber fencer, four-time Olympic champion
- Tamás Gábor (1932–2007), épée fencer, Olympic champion
- János Garay (1889–1945), saber fencer, Olympic champion, silver, bronze, killed in the Holocaust
- György Gedó (born 1949), Olympic champion light flyweight boxer
- Sándor Gellér (1925–1996), soccer goalkeeper, Olympic champion
- Imre Gellért, Olympic silver-medal winner (gymnastics team combined exercises)
- Zoltán Gera, soccer player; has played for Ferencváros, West Bromwich Albion and Fulham
- Dr. Oskar Gerde (1883–1944), saber fencer, two-time Olympic champion, killed in the Holocaust
- Aladár Gerevich, fencer, seven Olympic gold medals
- Charlie Gogolak (born 1944), American football number-one draft pick of the Washington Redskins
- Péter Gogolak (born 1942), American football; invented "soccer style" kicking; played for the New York Giants and the Buffalo Bills
- Dr. Sándor Gombos (1895–1968), saber fencer, Olympic champion
- Gyula Grosics, goalkeeper for Golden Magyar soccer team undefeated from 1950 to 1954
- Béla Guttmann (1900–1981), midfielder, national team football player, international coach; forced laborer in the Holocaust
- Andrea Gyarmati, Olympic swimmer silver (100-meter backstroke) and bronze (100-meter butterfly); world championships bronze (200-meter backstroke), International Swimming Hall of Fame
- Dezső Gyarmati, water polo player (triple Olympic champion)
- Alfréd Hajós (born Arnold Guttmann; 1878–1955), swimmer three-time Olympic champion (100-meter freestyle, 800-meter freestyle relay, 1,500-meter freestyle), International Swimming Hall of Fame
- Olivér Halassy (1909–1946), swimmer and water polo player
- Mickey Hargitay, bodybuilder and actor
- Nándor Hidegkuti (1922–2002), soccer player
- Endre Kabos (1906–1944), saber fencer, three-time Olympic champion, bronze; killed while a forced laborer in the Holocaust
- Janos Kajdi (1939–1992), Hungarian-born boxer who competed at the 1964, 1968 and 1972 Olympics in the lightweight, light-welterweight and welterweight divisions, he won a Silver medal in 1972.
- Garry Kallos (born 1956), Hungarian-born Canadian wrestler and sambo competitor
- Béla Károlyi (born 1942), premier gymnastics coach (ethnic Hungarian, lived in Romania, now a US citizen)
- Károly Kárpáti (also known as Károly Kellner), Olympic champion wrestler (freestyle lightweight), silver
- Ágnes Keleti (born 1921), five-time Olympic gymnastics champion
- Adolf Kertész (1892–1920), footballer
- Gyula Kertész (1888–1982), footballer
- Vilmos Kertész (1890–1962), footballer
- Kincsem (1874–1887), most successful racehorse in world history
- Sándor Kocsis (1929–1979), soccer player
- Zsuzsa Körmöczy, tennis player, world #2, won 1958 French Open Singles
- István "Koko" Kovács, boxer, Olympic champion and WBO world champion
- Pál Kovács, fencer, six Olympic gold medals
- Lily Kronberger (1890–1974), four-time world figure skating champion, two-time bronze, World Figure Skating Hall of Fame
- Péter Lékó (born 1979), chess player
- Imi Lichtenfeld, boxer and wrestler, developed the self-defense system Krav Maga
- Andor Lilienthal (1911–2010), chess player
- Johann Löwenthal (1810–1876), chess player
- Zoltán Magyar (born 1953), twice Olympic pommel horse gold medalist
- Gyula Mándi (1899–1969), half back Olympic footballer (player and coach of national teams)
- Géza Maróczy (1870–1951), chess player
- Opika von Méray Horváth, three-time world figure-skating champion
- József Munk, Olympic silver swimmer (4x200-meter freestyle relay)
- Nickolas Muray (born Miklós Mandl; 1892–1965), Hungarian-born American photographer and Olympic fencer
- Les Murray (born 1945 as László Ürge), Australian soccer broadcaster, sports journalist and analyst
- Henrik Nádler (1901–1944), international footballer
- Henrietta Ónodi, Olympic medal-winning gymnast (won gold, silver at Barcelona in 1992)
- Árpád Orbán (1938–2008), Olympic champion footballer
- László Papp, boxer (three-time Olympic champion)
- Attila Petschauer (1904–1943), sabre fencer, two-time team Olympic champion, silver; killed in the Holocaust
- Anna Pfeffer (born 1946), Olympic medalist sprint canoeist
- Judit Polgár (born 1976), chess player
- Zsófia Polgár (born 1974), chess player
- Zsuzsa Polgár (born 1969), chess player
- Imre Polyák, Olympic and World Champion Greco-Roman wrestler
- Lajos Portisch (born 1937), chess player
- Ferenc Puskás (1927–2006), football (soccer) player
- Béla Rajki-Reich (1909–2000), swimming coach and water polo coach
- Emília Rotter, pair skater, World Championship four-time gold, silver, Olympic two-times bronze
- Miklós Sárkány, two-time Olympic champion water polo player
- Zoltán Ozoray Schenker (1880–1966), saber fencer, Olympic champion
- Gusztáv Sebes (1906–1986), Hungarian national soccer coach
- Anna Sipos, 11-time world champion table tennis player, ITTFHoF
- László Szabados, Olympic bronze swimmer (4 x 200-meter freestyle relay)
- Miklós Szabados, 15-times world champion table tennis player
- László Szabó (1917–1998), chess player
- Ágnes Szávay (born 1988), tennis player
- András Székely (1909–1943), Olympic silver swimmer (200-meter breaststroke) and bronze (4 x 200-meter freestyle relay)
- Éva Székely (born 1927), Olympic champion and silver swimmer (200-meter breaststroke); International Swimming Hall of Fame; mother of Andrea Gyarmati
- Áron Szilágyi, sabre fencer, three-time Olympic and World champion
- Dominik Szoboszlai, Hungarian professional footballer
- László Szollás (1907–1980), pair skater, World Championship four-time gold, silver, Olympic two-times bronze
- Gábor Talmácsi (born 1981), 125 cc MotoGP World Champion
- Imre Taussig (1894–1945), Hungarian footballer
- Judit Temes (1930–2013), Olympic champion swimmer (4×100-meter freestyle), bronze (100-meter freestyle)
- Ildikó Újlaky-Rejtő (born 1937), foil fencer, two-time Olympic champion, world champion
- Antal Vágó (1891–1944), footballer
- Márton Vas (born 1980), ice hockey player
- Árpád Weisz (1896–1944), Olympic football player and manager
- Richárd Weisz, Olympic champion wrestler (Greco-Roman super heavyweight)
- Lajos Werkner (1883–1943), sabre fencer, two-time Olympic champion
- George Worth, born György Woittitz (1915–2006), American Olympic saber fencer
- Imre Zachár, Olympic silver swimmer (4x200-meter freestyle relay)

== Writers ==
- András Dugonics
- Endre Ady
- János Arany
- Mihály Babits
- Bálint Balassi
- János Batsányi
- Elek Benedek
- Dániel Berzsenyi
- Amália Bezerédj
- Mihály Csokonai Vitéz
- Péter Esterházy
- Mihály Fazekas
- András Fáy
- Géza Gárdonyi
- István Gyöngyösi
- Géza Gyóni
- Gyula Hornyánszky
- Mór Jókai
- Attila József
- Kálmán Kalocsay
- József Kármán
- Lajos Kassák
- József Katona
- Ferenc Kazinczy
- Zsigmond Kemény
- Andrew Karpati Kennedy
- Imre Kertész, winner of the Nobel Prize in Literature
- Sándor Kisfaludy
- Ferenc Kölcsey
- László Krasznahorkai, winner of the Man Booker International Prize
- Menyhért Lakatos
- György Lukács
- Imre Madách
- Sándor Márai
- Ferenc Molnár
- Ferenc Móra
- Zsigmond Móricz
- András Petőcz
- Sándor Petőfi
- Miklós Radnóti
- Agnes Rapai
- Jenő Rejtő
- Radoslav Rochallyi
- Istvan Rozanich
- András Sütő
- Lőrinc Szabó
- Magda Szabó
- Róbert Tábori
- Sebestyén Tinódi Lantos
- Árpád Tóth
- János Vajda
- József Vészi
- Mihály Vörösmarty
- Albert Wass
- Miklós Zrínyi
- Simon Kézai

== List of Hungarians who were born outside present-day Hungary ==
The borders of Hungary have changed substantially in the past century. Many places once part of Hungary now belong to neighboring countries. The list is organised by country of birth and those listed have the name of their birthplace (in parentheses) as it is currently named.

=== Austria ===
==== Burgenland ====
See also category in the German Wikipedia: Person (Burgenland).

- Robert Bárány (Vienna) – otologist
- Pál Kitaibel (Mattersburg) – chemist and botanist
- Ferenc Liszt (Raiding) – composer

=== Czechoslovakia ===
- Koloman Gögh (Kladno) – football player

=== Romania ===
- Endre Ady (Érmindszent/Mecenţiu) – poet
- Mariska Ady (Hadad/Hodod) – poet
- János Apáczai Csere (Apáca/Apața) – educator
- Lajos Áprily (Braşov) – poet
- János Arany (Salonta) – poet
- Albert-László Barabási (Cârţa) – physicist
- Béla Bartók (Sânnicolau Mare) – composer
- István Báthory (Șimleu Silvaniei) – captain and governor
- Elek Benedek (Băţanii Mici) – collector of folk tales
- Gábor Bethlen (Ilia) – captain and governor
- István Bocskai (Cluj-Napoca) – captain and governor
- Farkas Bolyai (Buia) – mathematician
- János Bolyai (Cluj-Napoca) – mathematician
- Ilona Borsai (Cluj-Napoca) – musicologist, folk music historian, academic
- Matthias Corvinus (Cluj-Napoca) – perhaps the most famous King of Hungary
- György Dózsa (Dalnic) – leader of a peasant revolt
- Jenő Dsida (Satu Mare) – poet
- André François (Timișoara) – painter and graphic artist
- Margit Kaffka (Carei) – poet and novelist
- Sándor Kányádi (Porumbenii Mari) – poet
- Ferenc Kazinczy (Şimian) – poet and language reformer
- Károly Kós (Timișoara) – architect
- Ferenc Kölcsey (Satu Mare) – poet; author of the national anthem
- Sándor Kőrösi Csoma (Chiuruş) – orientologist
- Béla Kun (Cehu Silvaniei) – politician
- György Kurtág (Lugoj) – composer
- György Ligeti (Târnăveni) – composer
- Bela Lugosi (Lugoj) – actor
- Kelemen Mikes (Zagon) – writer
- Balázs Orbán (Polonița) – writer, historian and politician
- Péter Pázmány (Oradea) – theologian and writer
- Sándor Reményik (Cluj-Napoca) – poet
- András Sütő (Cămărașu) – writer
- Áron Tamási (Lupeni) – writer
- Sámuel Teleki (Dumbrăvioara) – Africa researcher
- László Tőkés (Cluj-Napoca) – bishop and politician
- Árpád Tóth (Arad) – poet
- Sándor Veress (Cluj-Napoca) – pianist and composer
- Albert Wass (Răscruci) – writer and poet
- Miklós Wesselényi (Jibou) – politician, academician and writer
- Emília Zathureczky (Olasztelek) – museologist, collector

=== Serbia ===
- Géza Csáth (Subotica) – writer
- Dezső Kosztolányi (Subotica) – poet and writer
- Péter Lékó (Subotica) – chess grandmaster
- Monica Seles (Novi Sad) – tennis player
- John Simon (Subotica) – author; literary, theater and film critic

=== Slovakia ===
- Gyula Andrássy (Košice) – politician
- Gyula Andrássy the Younger (Trebišov) – politician
- Bálint Balassi (Zvolen) – poet
- Ernő Dohnányi (Bratislava) – conductor, composer and pianist
- Abraham Hochmuth (Bánovce nad Bebravou) – rabbi
- László Hudec (Banská Bystrica) – architect
- Mór Jókai (Komárno) – writer
- Lajos Kassák (Nové Zámky) – poet, painter, typographer and graphic artist
- Imre Madách (Dolná Strehová) – poet
- Sándor Márai (Košice) – writer
- Kálmán Mikszáth (Sklabiná) – writer
- Szilárd Németh (Komárno) – football player
- Ferenc II Rákóczi (Borša) – prince and leader of Hungarian uprising in 1703–11
- János Selye (Komárno) – psychologist and researcher
- Alice Széchenyi (Remetské Hámre) – heiress
- Mihály Tompa (Rimavská Sobota) – poet

=== Ukraine ===
==== Transcarpathia ====
- Mihály Munkácsy (Mukacheve) – painter
- Moshe Leib Rabinovich (Mukacheve) – rabbi and scholar

== See also ==
- List of Hungarian Americans
- List of Hungarian Jews
- List of Székelys
- Lists of people by nationality
- Lists of people by occupation
- List of people from Bács-Kiskun
- List of people from Budapest
- List of University of Szeged people
