= Gusztáv Nemeskéri =

Convicted Hungarian serial killer

- Born: 1960 (age 65–66); Hungarian People's Republic
- Other name: "The Katóka Street Killer"
- Conviction: Murder
- Penalty: Life imprisonment

Details
- Victims: 4
- Span of crimes: 1996–1999
- Country: Hungary
- State: Budapest
- Date apprehended: September 1999
- Imprisoned at: Star Prison

Gusztáv Nemeskéri (born 1960), known as The Katóka Street Killer, is a Hungarian serial killer who killed 4 people between 1996 and 1999 in order to settle his debts.

== Early life ==
Little is known about Nemeskéri's early life. During the criminal proceedings against him, he reported a traumatic childhood event in which he had to supervise his younger brother, who managed to free himself from his grasp and run towards a road where he was run over by a car. Since 1995, Nemeskéri had lived on 3rd Katóka Street in Budapest, working in the vegetable and pet food business. Not wanting to develop his business, he instead decided to buy property using loans. The repayment of the loans, however, made it increasingly difficult for a man to start besieging business to repay them. Fearing that he would forced into bankruptcy, Nemeskéri got an improvised gun.

== Murders ==
In 1996, an Argentinian dog breeder came to Hungary to buy dogs from Hungarian breeders. It is unknown how Nemeskéri met him, but on February 26, 1996, the Argentinian moved into his apartment. A business-related argument occurred between them, and Nemeskéri shot him, stealing $6,000 dollars and a gold ring. He put the body in a bag and hid in the car parked in his yard, and after a few weeks he buried the body in his garden. He was eventually taken in by police for questioning. The authorities administered a polygraph test, but due to an investigative error, the procedure was unsuccessful.

In June 1996 Nemeskéri had the electricity meter in his home checked by an electrician. Unsaturated, however, Nemeskéri had made falsified measurements to the device, which was detected by the electrician, who told Nemeskéri that he had to report this to the company, causing Nemeskéri to kill him. He plundered the corpse, stuffed it in a bag and unloaded it in front of his house. He left the bag in his courtyard and left for Vienna, where took part in a dog contest. He came home after a weekend break, and buried the man's body in his garden.

In December 1997, Nemeskéri decided to get the money he had spent on buying stamps from a postwoman. On December 12, 1997, he chased the woman in his car on the pretext of buying a duty stamp for a mandate, but instead shot the woman. He stole 750,000 forints from her and then carried the body next to a lake on the outskirts of Csömör. He then stole her personal belongings and hid them in his apartment. The decomposing body was found only in February 1998. A witness claimed to have seen the woman go into the car of a man. A good quality facial composite was created, but the police said that did not have evidence of a murder, and needed to investigate further.

Nemeskéri also owed money to his half-brother, Zsolt, who had previously loaned two million forints to his brother and had been asking him for repayment for a long time. Nemeskéri was unable to return it, so his half-brother filed a lawsuit against him. The trial was scheduled for April 8, 1999 by the court. On April 7, 1999, Nemeskéri invited Zsolt to his apartment on Katóka Street for a non-dispute settlement meeting. Instead, he shot his half-brother, hiding his body in the basement.

== Arrest and trial ==
The disappearance of the brother was investigated by police, and in September 1999 Nemeskéri was also called for questioning. He was suspected by investigators as he refused to answer any questions, but then surprisingly, he said he did not kill his brother. Police conducted a search at his house in Katóka Street, and found Zsolt's corpse in the basement. Officers then reported to have found other corpses around the house.

Nemeskéri denied having any involvement in the murder of his brother and the three other victims, but the detectives did not believe him. He did not confess in court until he recognized his brother's murder, but when in his last statement, he accused his brother of the murders, explaining the change of his religion as a sign from of admission by Péter Doszpot on the scene. According to Nemeskéri's testimony, Zsolt was a soldier and violent figure, who loved his family despite his abilities, claiming the murders were because of his brother's fierce character. He claimed that the Argentine dog breeder was accidentally shot by his brother while he was playing around with his weapon, but he only realised the accident when he came home from the store. He also claimed to have taken the electrician to his brother, as he was struck by lightning, and Zsolt had become so angry that he shot the electrician, also shooting the postwoman when they started fighting. Nemeskéri selfishly considered himself a victim, repeatedly referring to the importance of family relations in the court, saddened by his half-brother's and the electrician's deaths.

However, the tactic did not work. In his judgment, the judge underline that Nemeskéri had escaped jail after his first murder and had the opportunity to change his lifestyle, but instead turned towards more murders. At the first instance of the Metropolitan Court, Nemeskéri was sentenced to life imprisonment, a sentence which could only be reviewed 40 years later. The first instance verdict from the prosecutor was accepted, but Nemeskéri filed for a pardon. In the second instance judgment, the Municipal Court of Appeal essentially left the initial verdict unchanged, only finding that the fourth murder was for the sombre reason of exasperating the man's punishment to an actual life-span. In the end, the "Katóka Street Killer" was sent to the Star Prison in Szeged to serve out his life sentence.

== See also ==
- List of serial killers by country
