= Asboth =

Asboth or Asbóth is a Hungarian surname. Notable people with the surname include:

- Alexander Asboth (1810–1868), Hungarian-American Union Army general
- József Asbóth (1917–1986), Hungarian tennis player
- Oszkár Asboth (1891–1960), Hungarian aviation pioneer
