= Dacian fortress of Porumbenii Mari =

- Location within Romania
- 46.27°N 25.13°E
- Location: Porumbenii Mari, Harghita, Romania

Site notes
- Condition: Ruined

Monument istoric
- Reference no.: HR-I-s-A-12698

It was a Dacian fortified town.
