= Mugeni =

Mugeni Bögöz
- Commune
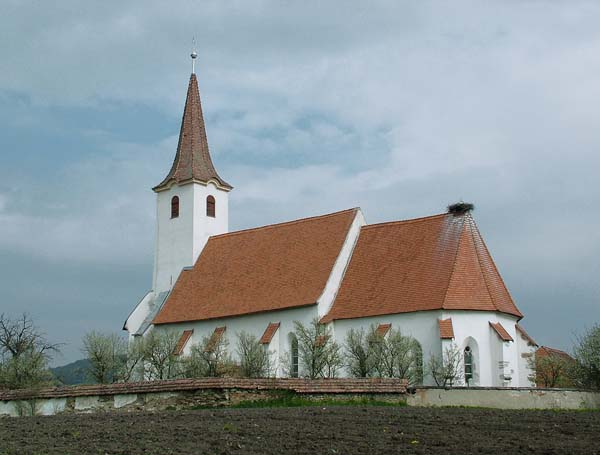
- The Reformed church

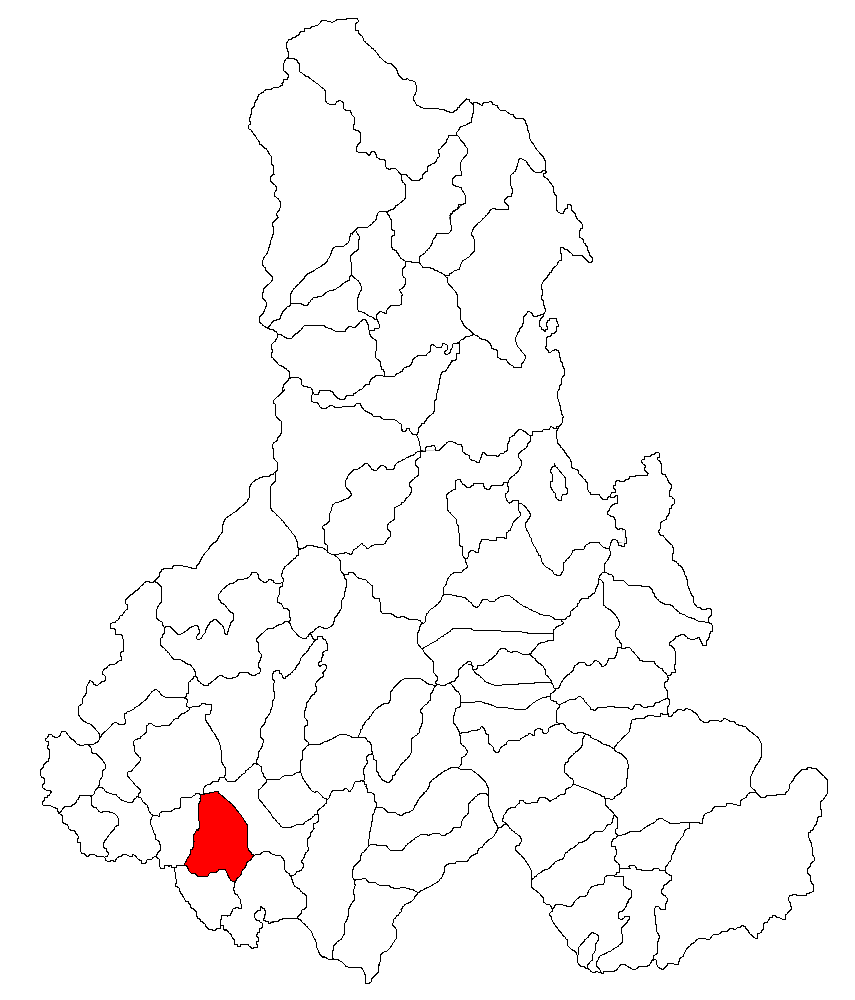
- Location in Harghita County

- Location in Romania
- Coordinates: 46°15′N 25°13′E
- Country: Romania
- County: Harghita

Government
  - Mayor (2020–2024): Zoltán Ülkei (UDMR)
- Area: 65.30 km^{2} (25.21 sq mi)
- Elevation: 441 m (1,447 ft)
- Population (2021-12-01): 3,329
  - Density: 50.98/km^{2} (132.0/sq mi)
- Time zone: UTC+02:00 (EET)
  - Summer (DST): UTC+03:00 (EEST)
- Postal code: 537205
- Area code: +40 266
- Vehicle reg.: HR
- Website: bogozkozseg.ro

Mugeni (Hungarian: Bögöz [ˈbøɡøz]) is a commune in Harghita County, Romania. It lies in the Székely Land, an ethno-cultural region in eastern Transylvania.

The commune is located in the southwestern part of the county, 9 km (5.6 mi) from Odorheiu Secuiesc and 57 km (35 mi) from the county seat, Miercurea Ciuc.

== Component villages ==
The commune is composed of eight villages:

In Romanian	In Hungarian	First recorded	Pop.^{(2002)}
Aluniș	Székelymagyaros	In 1566 as Mogijoros	143
Beta	Béta	In 1566 as Beta	304
Dejuțiu	Décsfalva	In 1566 as Dechfalva	200
Dobeni	Székelydobó	In 1334 as Dobov	587
Lutița	Agyagfalva	In 1506 as Agyagfalva	760
Mătișeni	Mátisfalva	In 1567 as Mattijwsffalwa	128
Mugeni	Bögöz	In 1333 as Bugus	1042
Tăietura	Vágás	In 1334 as Voygias	296

In 2004, the villages of Porumbenii Mari and Porumbenii Mici formed the commune of Porumbeni (Nagygalambfalva). The village of Betești (Betfalva) was transferred to the town of Cristuru Secuiesc that year.

== History ==
The villages forming the present-day commune were part of the Székely Land region of the historical Transylvania province. They belonged to Csíkszék district until the administrative reform of Transylvania in 1876, when they fell within the Csík County in the Kingdom of Hungary. In the aftermath of World War I and the Hungarian–Romanian War of 1918–1919, it passed under Romanian administration; after the Treaty of Trianon of 1920, like the rest of Transylvania, it became part of the Kingdom of Romania. During the interwar period, the locality fell within plasa Odorhei of Odorhei County. In 1940, the Second Vienna Award granted Northern Transylvania to Hungary and the village was held by Hungary until 1944. After Soviet occupation, the Romanian administration returned and the village became officially part of Romania in March 1945. Between 1952 and 1960, the commune fell within the Magyar Autonomous Region, between 1960 and 1968 the Mureș-Magyar Autonomous Region. In 1968, the region was abolished, and since then, the commune has been part of Harghita County.

== Demographics ==
The commune has an absolute Hungarian (Székely) majority. According to the 2002 census, it had a population of 3,460, of which 98.82% were Hungarians. At the 2011 census, there were 3,491 inhabitants, of which 97.05% were Hungarians. At the 2021 census, Mugeni had a population of 3,329; of those, 91.35% were Hungarians and 1.17% Roma.

== Notable people ==
- Imre Palló (1891–1978), leading baritone at the Budapest State Opera
- Lajos Gidófalvy (1901–1945), military officer, antifascist activist
- János Kardalus (1935–2006), ethnographer

== Gallery ==
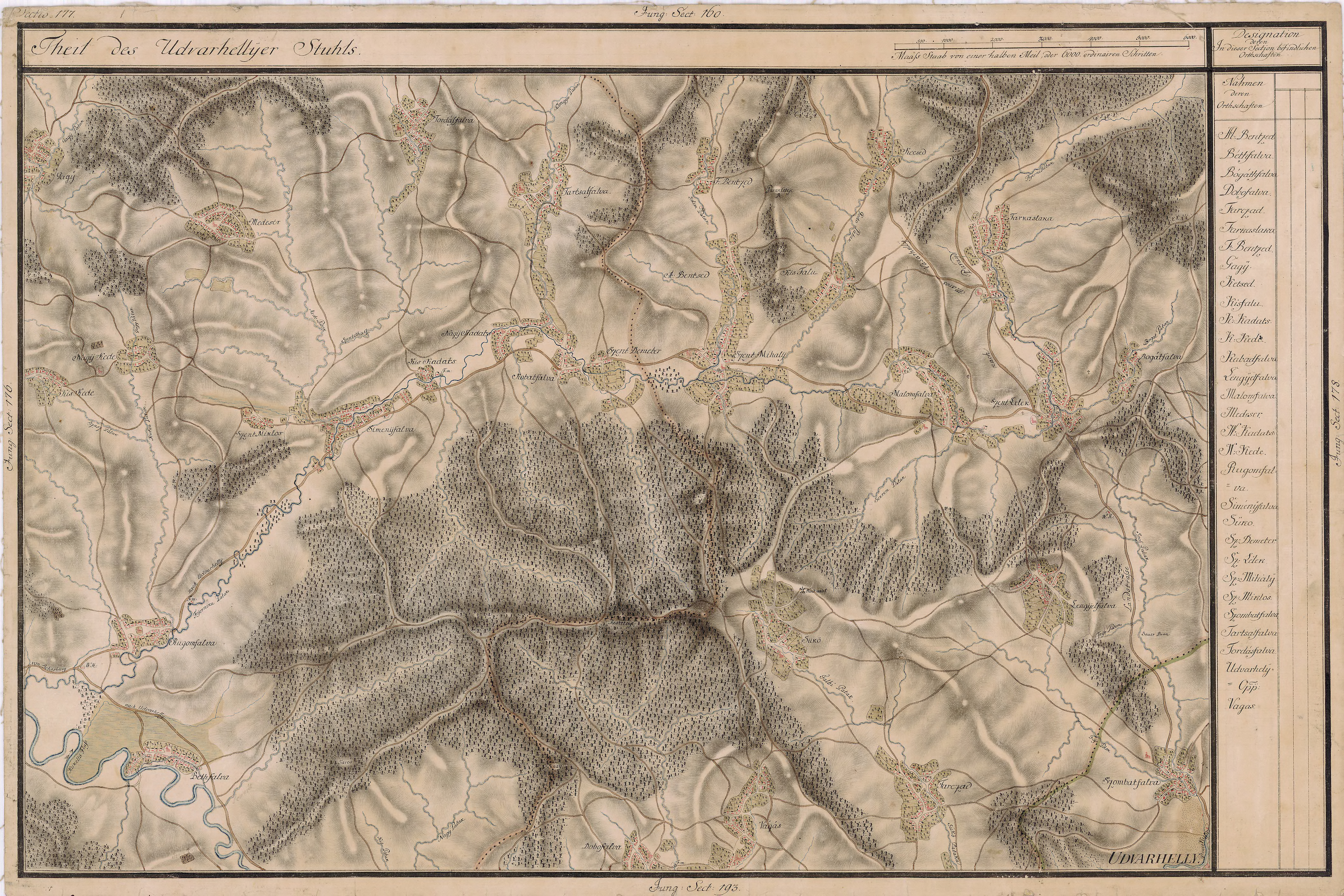
Josephinische Landaufnahme, 1769-1773

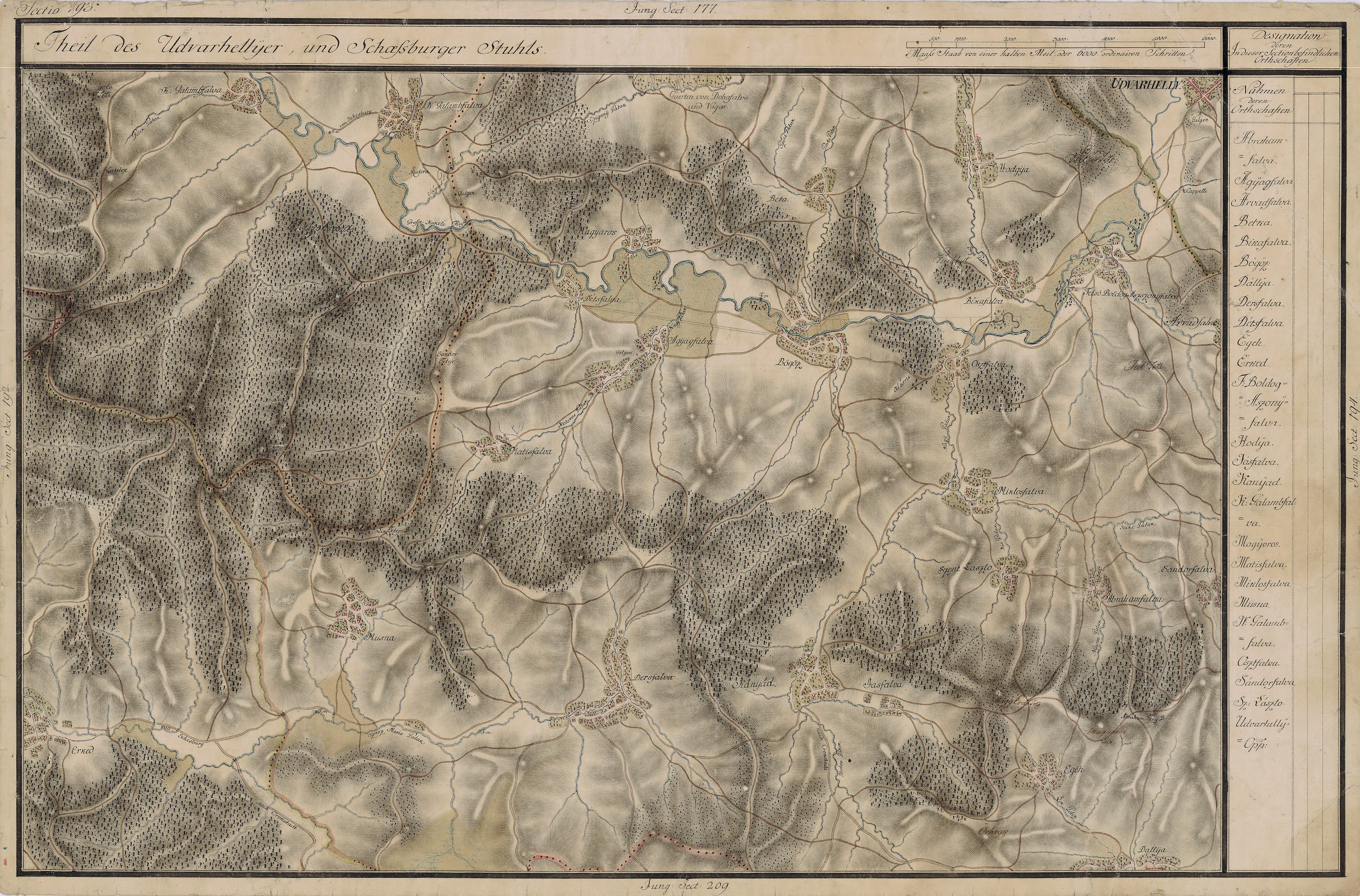
Josephinische Landaufnahme, 1769-1773
