= Sándor Kenyeres =

Hungarian property developer, scientific philanthropist, and cultural visionary

- Born: February 13, 1949 (age 77); Decs, Hungary
- Education: Budapest University of Technology and Economics
- Occupation: Property developer ˑ businessman ˑ entrepreneur
- Years active: 1973-present

Sandor Kenyeres (born 13 February 1949) is a Hungarian international business magnate, and scientific philanthropist. The Hungarian born entrepreneur and investor achieved early success across multiple sectors including construction, real estate and fashion and more recently the hospitality industry. He was founder and former president of the Talentis Group, tasked with creating Hungary's very own Silicon Valley and providing funding and education for high-tech startups through a dedicated incubator programme.

== Early life and education ==
Kenyeres was born in the village of Decs, Hungary. His father was a local carpenter, whose resourcefulness played a major source of inspiration throughout Kenyeres's life. Kenyeres attended high school in the nearby city of Szekszard, where he graduated with honours from Garay Janos High School in 1969. After high school, he enrolled in the Budapest University of Technology and Economics (Hungary's equivalent of MIT). During his university studies, he became fascinated with electronics and ended up graduating with a degree in electrical engineering (1973).

== Career ==
=== Electronics: Tungsram ===
After Kenyeres's graduation in 1973, he began to work for Tungsram, the Hungarian national electronics manufacturer. At Tungsram, he worked as a research engineer in charge of managing projects, coordinating production, and supervising investments.

In 1976, Tungsram sent Kenyeres abroad to study the semi-conductor business at the Fairchild Semi-conductor Int. in preparation for setting up a semi-conductor manufacturing facility in Gyöngyös, Hungary. Along with two other Tungsram colleagues, he first moved to Silicon Valley, United States in 1976 to study semiconductor production practices. In 1977, he moved to Japan (Tokyo and Nagoya) in order to better understand the software and equipment necessary for semi-conductor production.

=== Construction: Burginvest Rt. ===
In 1978, Kenyeres felt constrained by his corporate position at Tungsram and decided to follow his entrepreneurial spirit by creating Burginvest Rt., a residential construction company. With Burginvest, he applied the construction skills that he learned from his father and constructed apartment buildings and villas in Budapest's Buda Hills.

=== Fashion & Design ===
In 1982, Kenyeres grew weary of the construction industry and decided to experiment with his childhood fascination in shoe design. As a child, he learned the skills of shoemaking from his father. With this basic knowledge, Kenyeres started up a women's shoe company called Szandra Shoes & Design. His company designed and produced women's shoes until the end of communism in 1989.

=== Property Development ===
==== Buda City Centre ====
Following the regime change, Kenyeres took advantage of his first chance to freely travel outside Hungary by going on a world tour through Europe, Asia, and the US. During this tour, he was struck by the stark contrasts between the developed Western Europe and the lack of development in Central and Eastern Europe. In response, he decided to return to his home country in 1992 and dedicate himself to the development of Budapest.

Kenyeres worked on the concept of the Buda City Centre, a plan to transform a run-down neighborhood into a social hub for Budapest, including commercial (e.g. Mammut Shopping Centre), communal (e.g. Fény Street Market), and green elements (e.g. Millenaris Park).

In 1998, Kenyeres completed construction on time and within budget, launching the highly anticipated flagship Mammut Centre to great acclaim. The commercial, office, entertainment, public facilities, and parking complex proved so successful that within the decade Kenyeres commissioned the centre's expansion, Mummut 2, increasing the overall size of the Mammut complex to 105,000 sq. m, 330 stores, and 1,200 parking spaces, upon opening at the beginning of the new millennium.

In parallel with Mammut Centre's development, Kenyeres supported several programmes to improve the surrounding community. He gave his support to the rehabilitation of neighboring streets, including Retek Street, Feny Street and Lovohaz Street. He encouraged the erection in front of Mammut Centre of a monument to the martyrs of the 1956 Hungarian Revolution. He helped to create the Foundation for the Future of the Homeless, improving the living conditions of the district's homeless.

Kenyeres's development efforts were internationally recognised when Mammut Centre was awarded the 2003 FIABCI Prix d’Excellence for quality urban development.

== Scientific philanthropy ==
Due to Kenyeres's background as an electrical engineer, he recognises the importance of promoting scientific research, particularly the research efforts of younger scientists. For this purpose, in 2002 Kenyeres founded the Talentum Prize together with the Central European Talent Scout Foundation and the Hungarian Academy of Science.

The Talentum Prize provides recognition and financial support to young scientific researchers who demonstrate extraordinary talent. Each year, the prize is awarded to three young Central European scholars, professionals or researchers who offer a promising scientific concept, issue or professional programme. In addition to scientific value, each offering is assessed based on its social benefits, feasibility and impact on the quality of life.

In 2003, Kenyeres was the main sponsor and speaker at the World Science Forum in Budapest, a milestone event that included as one of its speakers the famous central banker Alexandre Lamfalussy. At this event, Kenyeres introduced the Talentis Project, the goal of which is to develop a Central European hub for promoting scientific research in the Zsambek region of Hungary.

== Hotel Developments ==
In recent years, real estate development has been the focus of Kenyeres's interest. Over the past five years, three hotels in the centre of Budapest have been taken over by Dominarium, which has been renovated one by one: the T62 Hotel, the D8 Hotel and the M-Square Hotel. The creation of a health hotel, called Grapehill Residence is one of the ongoing projects in his life. The planning and preparation phase is already in full swing, with work expected to begin by 2023. The complex will be located in the immediate vicinity of Budapest.
