= Petróczy-Kármán-Žurovec =

Hungarian and Czech aeronautical engineers

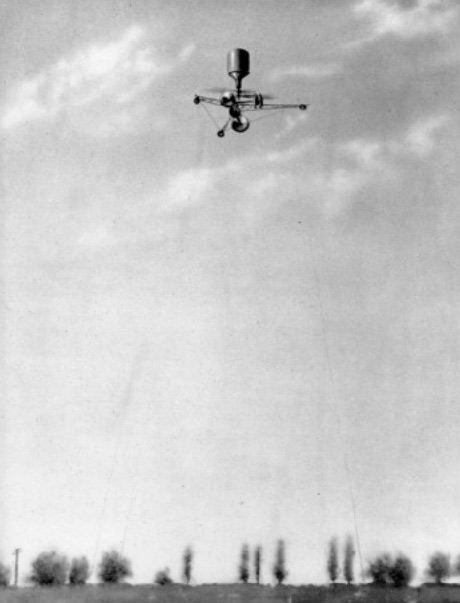
The PKZ-2 hovering at a height of 50 m in 1918

Petróczy, Kármán and Žurovec were Hungarian and Czech engineers who worked on helicopter development immediately before and during World War I in Budapest. Between them they produced two experimental prototypes, the PKZ-1 and PKZ-2, intended to replace the dangerous hydrogen-filled observation balloons then in use. As such, these craft were tethered on long cables and were not intended to fly freely. After the war, other engineers, notably Oszkár von Asboth, further developed the design.

== History ==
In 1916, the aviator and Austro-Hungarian Army Colonel István Petróczy proposed an electrically driven rotorcraft to replace the dangerously flammable observation balloon. His original concept was for the electric motor to be supplied by a dynamo driven by an internal combustion engine.

Austro-Daimler were at that time developing a lightweight electric motor for aircraft use, but would take several years to develop one able to handle the electrical power required. A major problem was in providing high-quality insulation for the motor windings, which could get very hot in use.

Meanwhile, tests on the large propellers then available showed them to be too inefficient and so a research programme into efficient large propellers, for use as rotors, was begun at Fischamend airfield. Dr. Theodore von Kármán was the director of the research group at Fischamend and Ensign Vilém Žurovec was an engineer there.

Model tests showed that proposed designs with a single tether were unstable. Initially four tethers were used to provide stability, but this was later reduced to three.

By 1917 the technology appeared ready and two rotary-wing aircraft, the PKZ-1 and PKZ-2, were built under separate projects. Both types hovered briefly while tethered, though even with the tethers they were barely controllable and required skilful handling of the tethers. At the time these were referred to as Schrauben-Fesselflieger or SFF (propeller-driven captive aircraft). The PKZ designations were applied later in a postwar article by Kármán.

A third design, for a small unmanned version powered by a single Gnome rotary piston engine, was constructed in 1918. It was intended to carry meteorological (weather) instruments or radio antennas aloft, but it is not known whether it ever flew.

== PKZ-1 ==
The PKZ-1 was designed by Karman and Žurovec, and built by MÁG Company in Budapest under Karman's direction. It had four radiating arms with a 3.9 m four-bladed rotor or propeller on top of each, geared in pairs such that each pair spun in the opposite direction. The rotors were driven from a single Austro-Daimler electric motor located centrally, beneath the observer's cockpit. The 195 kg motor produced 140 kilowatts (190 hp) at 6,000 rpm, limited by the heat resistance of the insulation around the windings – in other respects it was capable of producing 190 kW (250 hp). A ground-based generator fed direct current (DC) through the tethering cables to the motor. Landing gear comprised four inflated rubber-fabric cushions, one under the end of each arm.

The finished craft was taken to Fischamend for flight testing. In a short series of four test flights in March 1918 the craft was able to lift three men. The wiring insulation in the motor burned out on the fourth flight and was not repaired.

== PKZ-2 ==
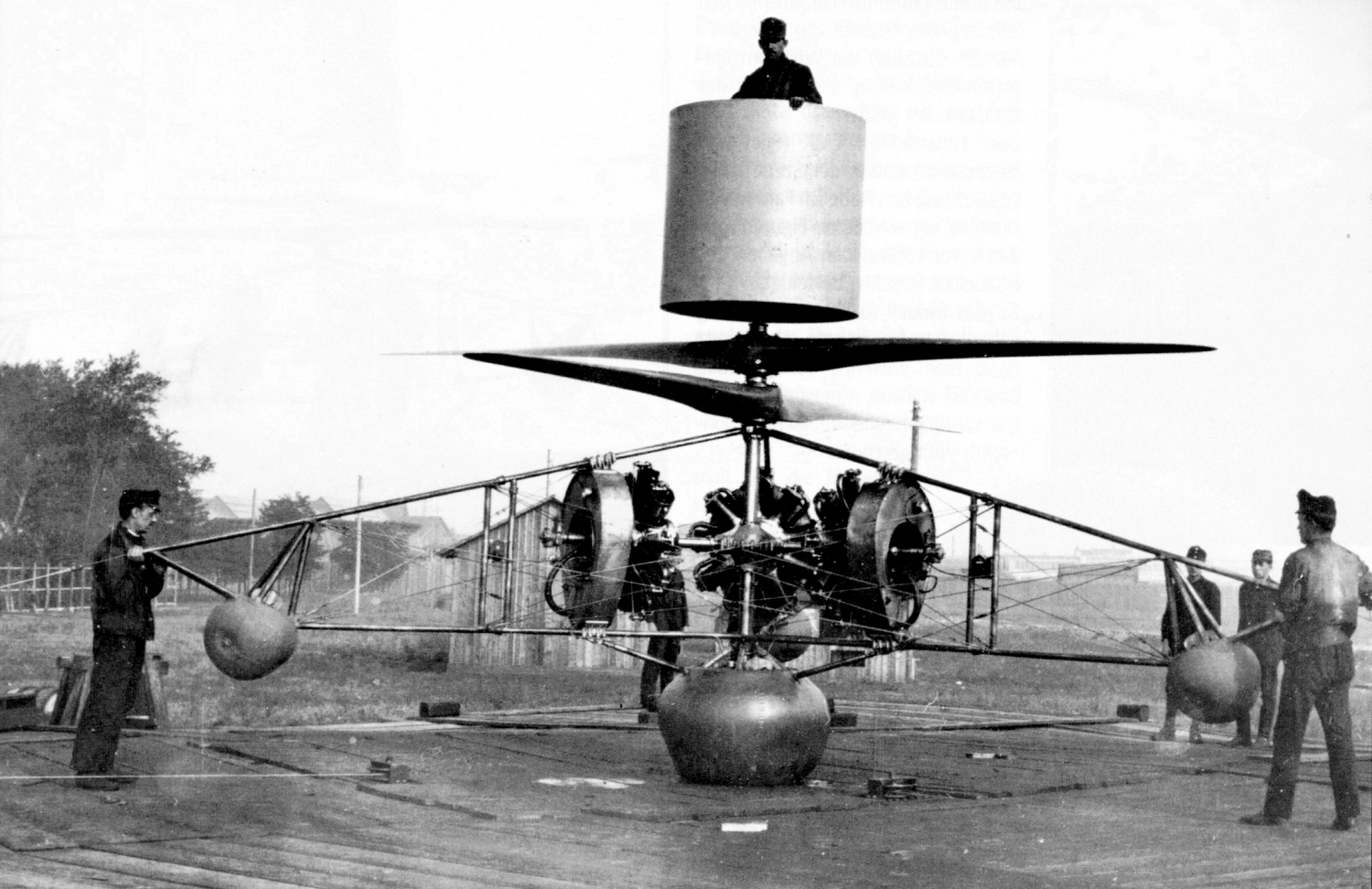
The PKZ-2 with a single observer on board

The PKZ-2 was developed by Žurovec in parallel with the PKZ-1, but wholly independently. Zurovec acknowledged the support only of Petróczy, although later reports have mistakenly attributed the entire design to Kármán. The aircraft was built by Dr Liptak & Co AG under Žurovec's direction. It had three radiating arms, each housing a rotary piston engine. These engines were coupled together to drive a central pair of co-axial, contra-rotating two-bladed wooden propellers or rotors, of 6 m diameter, mounted above the airframe. A round cockpit for the aircrew was fixed centrally, on top of the rotor mast. Landing gear again comprised rubber-fabric cushions, one large central one and three smaller ones at the end of each arm.

The PKZ-2 began flight trials on 2 April 1918. Initially fitted with three Gnome rotary engines of 75 kW (100 hp), these were found insufficient to maintain safety at any altitude and were replaced by le Rhone rotary engines of 89 kW (120 hp). In this form the PKZ-2 could rise to a height of over 50 m and hover for up to half an hour, although it was unstable and remained tethered on long cables. To maintain stability and control, the tethers had to remain in tension, as if the engines faltered the tethers could slacken and control would be lost.

On 10 June the aircraft was demonstrated to Air Service officials. The le Rhone engines were not reliable and Žurovec had misgivings about the demonstration. These turned out to be justified when the engines faltered. The tether handlers panicked and this resulted in a crash-landing, damaging the craft and breaking the rotors. After the war the Italians confiscated the aircraft and took it back to Italy.

== Von Asboth ==
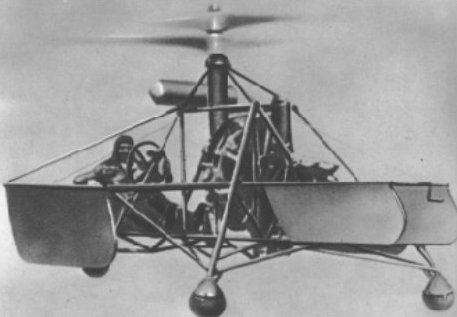
The AH-4 in flight

Oszkár von Asboth was one of the researchers at Fischamend. In 1917 he commissioned Ufag to make a full-scale prototype to his own design, but it was destroyed in a fire before completion. After the war he went on to build and fly several more helicopters. One was constructed in 1920 but later destroyed on the order of the Allied Control Commission. Subsequent examples based on the PKZ-2 design were designated AH-1 to AH-4 and made over 150 successful flights between 1928 and 1930. Von Asboth later set up companies in Britain and France to promote his twin-rotor designs, and at least one machine was built by the French company.

== See also ==
- Focke-Achgelis Fa 330 – Type of rotary-wing kite
