= Decs =

- Location of Tolna county in Hungary

- Location of Decs
- Coordinates: 46.28461°N 18.75694°E
- Country: Hungary
- County: Tolna

Area
  - Total: 94.71 km^{2} (36.57 sq mi)

Population (2004)
  - Total: 4,285
  - Density: 45.24/km^{2} (117.2/sq mi)
- Time zone: UTC+1 (CET)
  - Summer (DST): UTC+2 (CEST)
- Postal code: 7144
- Area code: 74

Decs is a large village in Tolna County, Hungary.

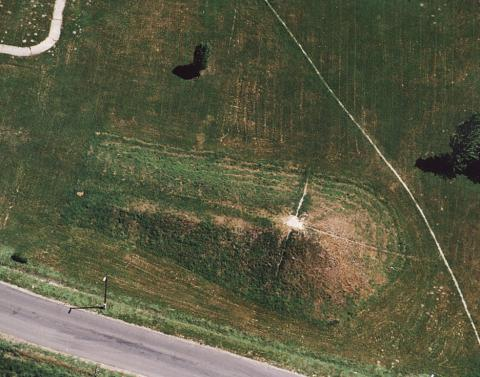
