= Anna Wesselényi =

Hungarian countess and writer

Anna Wesselényi (also Csáky) (1584–1649), was a Hungarian countess and writer, producing world about morality and religion. Additionally, much of her correspondence has been published.

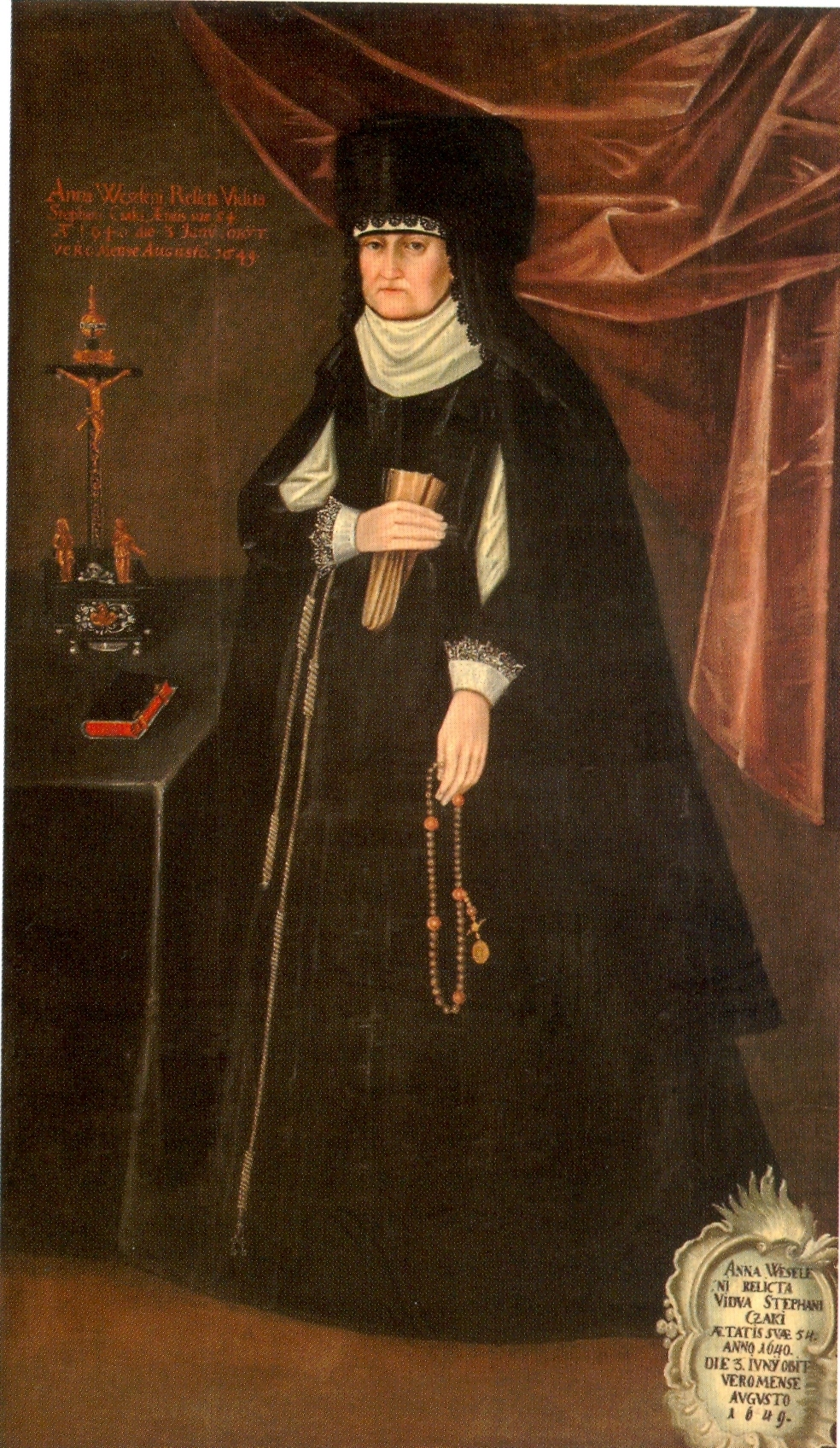
Portrait of Wesselényi Anna

Anna was born in Poland in 1584. She married István Csáky, with whom she had at least two children, yet she became a widow at only age 21, in 1605.
