= Róbert Tábori =

Hungarian writer (1855–1906)

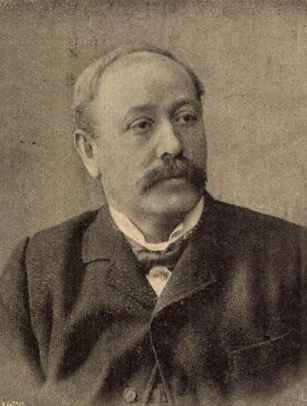
Róbert Tábori

Róbert Tábori (November 10, 1855 – 1906) was a Hungarian author born at Almas and educated in Baja, Budapest, and Vienna. He began his literary career in 1874 as a journalist on the Vienna "Fremdenblatt," later joining the staff of the "Morgenpost." From 1887 to 1890 he edited the "Südungarische Zeitung" at Temesvar, and was later the editor of the literary magazine "Uj Idök" in Budapest.

Of Tábori's works, which were especially popular among the young in his day, may be mentioned: "A Szobor Titka," 1885, a novel; "Kulturképek," 1889, short stories; "Ildikó," 1890, a drama; "Párbaj," 1890, a novel; "Az Etet Folytatásokban," 1890, a novel; "Átalakulások," 1893, a novel; "Szabadsághősök," 1894, a novel; "Korhadt Oszlopok," 1895, a novel; "Oceania," 1898, short stories; and "Megfagyott Pezsgö," 1899, a novel.
