= Sándor Kányádi =

Hungarian poet and translator

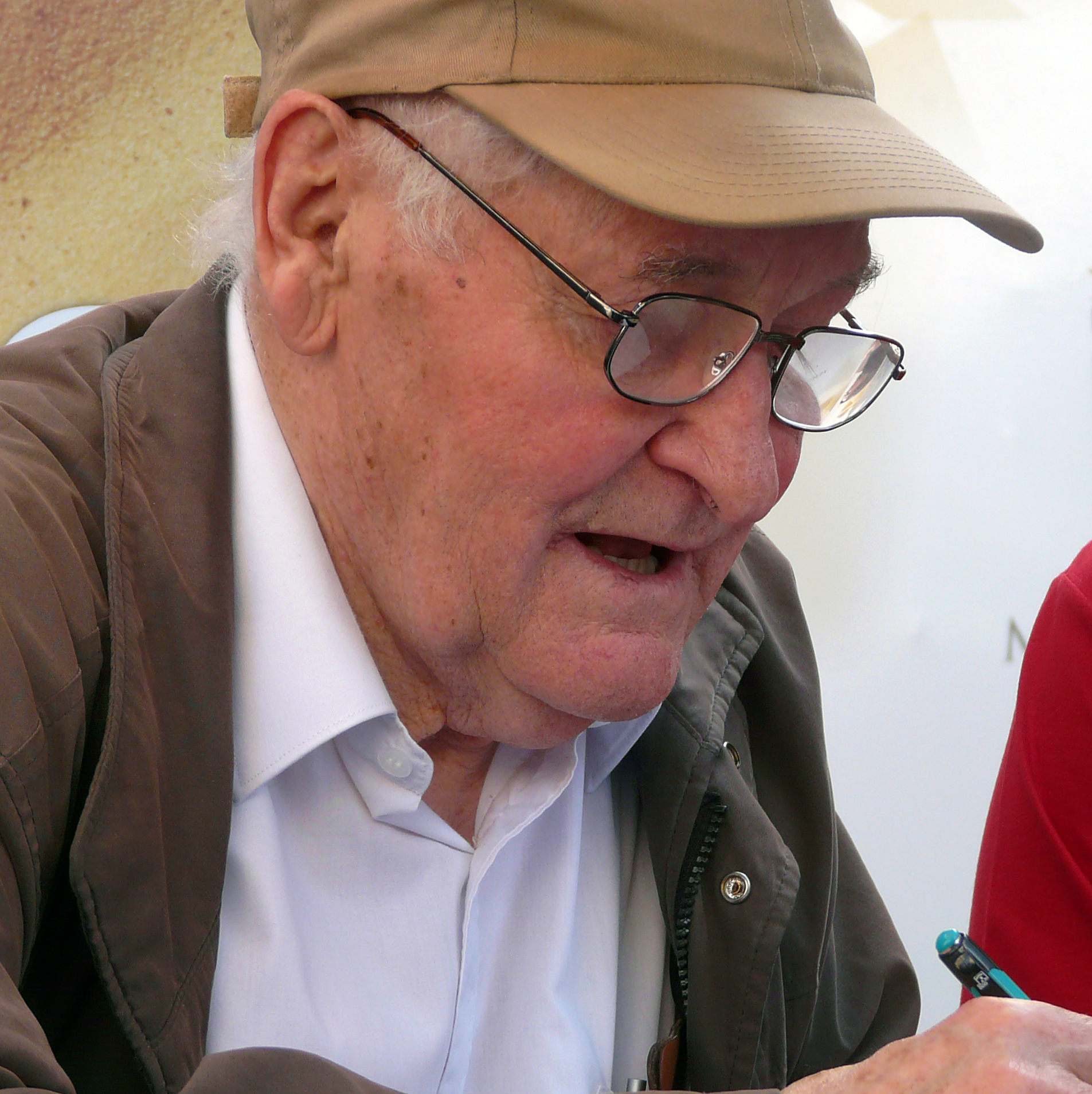
- Sándor Kányádi
- Born: 10 May 1929; Porumbeni, Romania
- Died: 20 June 2018 (aged 89); Budapest, Hungary
- Citizenship: Romanian
- Occupation: poet
- Writing career
- Notable work: "In Contemporary Tense"
- Notable awards: Kossuth Prize; Herder Prize

Signature
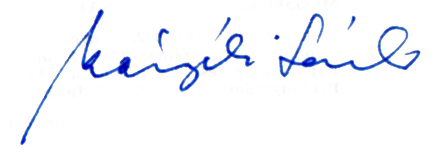

Sándor Kányádi (Hungarian pronunciation: [ˈʃaːndor ˈkaːɲaːdi]; 10 May 1929 – 20 June 2018) was a Hungarian poet and translator from the region of Transylvania, Romania. He was one of the most famous and beloved contemporary Hungarian poets. He was a major contributor to Hungarian children's literature. His works have been translated into English, Finnish, Estonian, Swedish, German, French, Romanian and Portuguese.

== Biography ==
He was born in Porumbenii Mari (Hungarian: Nagygalambfalva), a small Hungarian village in the region of Transylvania, to a family of Hungarian farmers. He was educated in the nearby town of Odorheiu-Secuiesc (Hungarian: Székelyudvarhely). Present-day Tamási Áron Gimnázium was his alma mater. He moved to Cluj in 1950. Nowadays, he split his time between Budapest and his cottage in the Transylvanian countryside.

Kányádi graduated from Bolyai University (before Bolyai University was forced to merge with the Romanian university to form present-day Babes-Bolyai University) with a teacher's qualification and degree in Hungarian language and literature. He published his first volume of poetry in 1955 while an assistant editor and frequent contributor to several literary magazines, including poems in children's magazines that are still very popular today. His translations are also very popular and include Saxon and Yiddish folk poetry, contemporary Romanian poetry, and major German and French poets. He also gave several literary talks abroad during the 1960s and 1970s to Hungarian communities in Western Europe, Scandinavia, North America, and South America.

He was active in political issues throughout the years, as shown in his numerous works relating to the oppression of the Transylvanian Hungarian minority. In 1987, the Romanian Communist government refused him a passport to visit an international poets' conference in Rotterdam, which resulted in his resignation from the Romanian Writers' Union out of protest.

== Awards ==
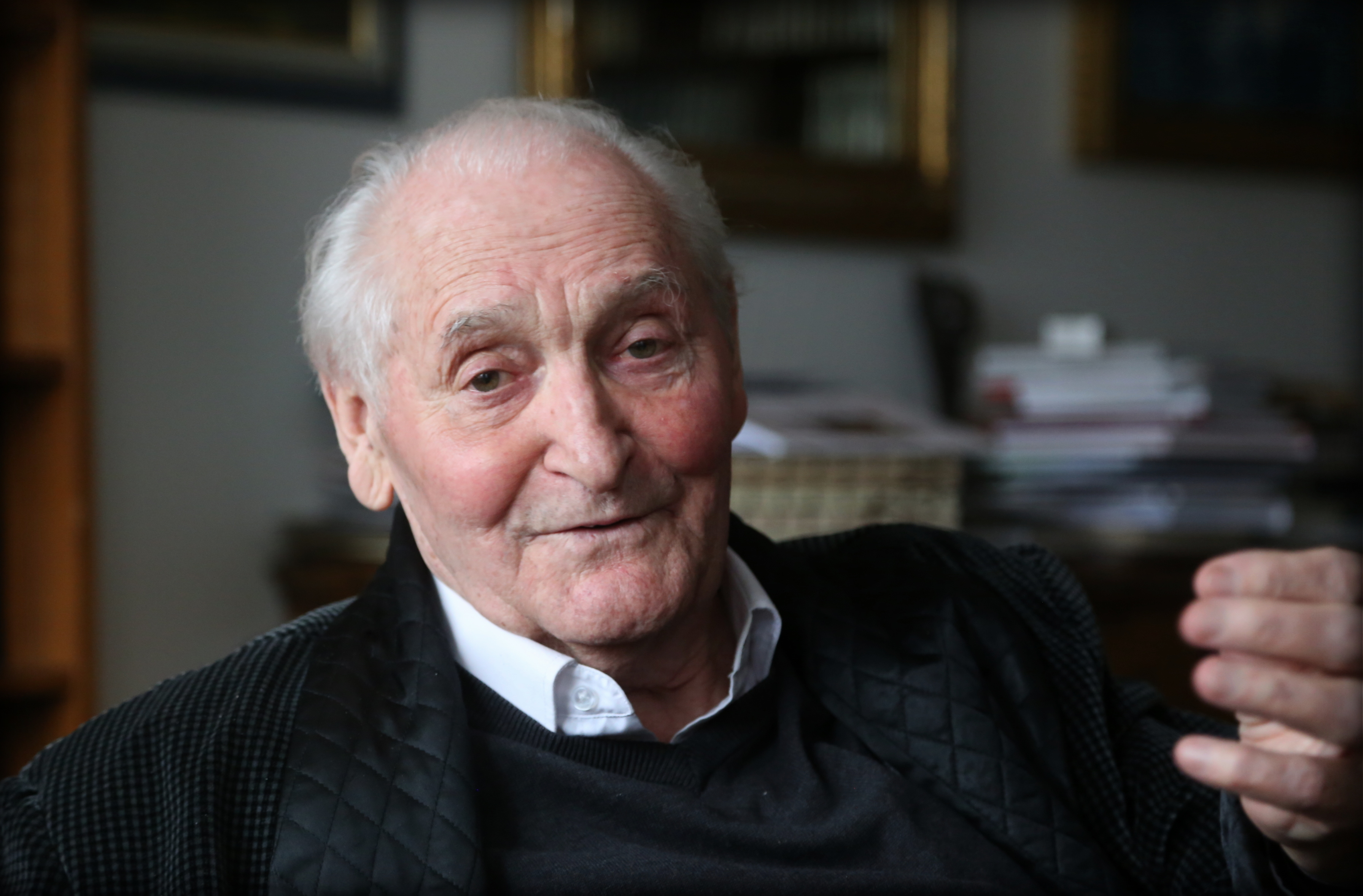
Sándor Kányádi

He garnered more than 30 awards and honors, among others:

- Kossuth Prize, Budapest, 1993
- Poetry Prize of the Romanian Writers' Union
- Herder Prize in Vienna in 1995,
- Central European Time Millennium Prize, 2000
