= László Fassang =

Hungarian organist, pianist and improviser

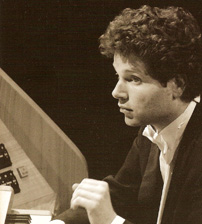
László Fassang

László Fassang (born December 12, 1973, in Budapest) is a Hungarian organist, pianist and improviser.

== Biography ==
Fassang was born into a family immersed in music. He started his organ studies at the age of 13 with István Baróti and graduated from the Franz Liszt Academy of Music in 1998, where he had studied organ with Ferenc Gergely and István Ruppert, and piano with Ilona Prunyi. The same year he enrolled in the organ class of Olivier Latry and Michel Bouvard at the Conservatoire de Paris. In 1999 Fassang got also accepted to the improvised music department where he studied under Loic Mallié, Philippe Lefebvre, Thierry Escaich and Jean-François Zygel.

As part of his studies he spent a sabbatical year in Japan, where he became the resident organist of the Sapporo Concert Hall. During that time, he performed several concerts in Japan, and recorded his first organ CD on the Kern organ at Sapporo Concert Hall that included music of Bach and Liszt as well as his own improvisations. Since 2002 he has performed concerts in France, Hungary, Germany, the Netherlands, Switzerland, Canada, Japan and in the USA.

In 2003 and 2004 Fassang graduated from the organ class and from the improvisation class of the Conservatoire of Paris with excellent results (first prize with honours). From 2004 to 2008 he taught improvisation at the Musikene (Higher Academy of Music of the Basque Country) in San Sebastián. After 6 years abroad, he decided to return to his native country, and settle down there. Since September 2008, he is assistant professor at the Franz Liszt Academy of Music in Budapest. He was responsible for supervising the construction of the organ of the Béla Bartók National Concert Hall and was appointed artistic consultant of the organ concerts of the Palace of Arts in Budapest in 2006. His improvisational style demonstrates the versatility of the organ through the incorporation of jazz and folk music influences. He continues to play classical works, but he also performs concerts with French saxophonist Vincent Lê-Quang, with Hungarian musician Balázs Dongó Szokolay (flutes, saxophone, bagpipe), Hungarian guitarist Gabor Gado, and Hungarian folksinger, Beata Palya.

== Main awards ==
- 2006: Liszt Ferenc Prize; Prima Prize
- 2004: Grand Prix de Chartres International Organ Competition - Grand Prize and "Audience Choice"
- 2003: First German-French International Organ Competition (Windesheim) - Second Prize (tie) and Special Prize for best interpretation of French works
- 2002: Royal Bank Calgary International Organ Festival and Competition - Improvisation Gold Medal
- 2002: 4th International Competition of the City of Paris - Second Prize of improvisation and Duruflé Prize
- 1998: Győr International Organ Competition (Hungary) - Second Prize
- 1993: Zoltán Gárdonyi Memorial Competition (Budapest) - First Prize

== Discography ==
- Fassang László – Vincent Le Quang: The Course of the Moon, 2007 Orpheia
- László Fassang plays the grand organ of the Cathedral Notre-Dame Chartres, 2005 INTRADA
