= István Rozanich =

Hungarian poet and newspaper editor

- Born: August 28, 1912; Csáktornya
- Died: November 5, 1984 (aged 72); Houston
- Occupations: poet, writer and journalist

István Rozanich (Csáktornya, August 28, 1912 - Houston, November 5, 1984) was a Hungarian poet, writer and journalist.

== Education ==
István Rozanich was born in 1912 in Csáktornya. He completed his schooling in Sárkeresztúr and Székesfehérvár, Fejér county. There he graduated from the Cistercian St. Stephen's High School.

Already at that time his interest turned to literature and poetry, and he and his classmates published an anthology entitled Jövőnk.

== Career ==
He started his career as a journalist after his graduation, becoming an in-house journalist for the daily newspaper Új Fehérvár. During the Second World War they moved first to Erdély and then to Újvidék. In 1942, his youth novel, Gonosz, was published.

On Maundy Thursday 1945, he and his family fled to the West, and after a period in Bavaria, France and Belgium, they finally settled in Venezuela in 1949.

In Caracas, from 1956 onwards, he devoted all his free time to editing the weekly newspaper Caribi Újság. In 1954, his historical short novel A harangozó csodája was published in the USA, and in 1974 he enriched Hungarian emigration literature with his poetry collection Kenyér és bor, published by the Buenos Aires publishing house Transylvania.

His translations are also significant, he translated several Venezuelan poets into Hungarian, and he translated a volume of poems from German literature into Hungarian.

He spent the last years of his life in the United States. He died in Houston on 5 November 1984.

After his death, a collection of his poems in English was published in Hungary in 2005 under the title Selected Poems.
