= Apața =

Apața Apáca
- Commune
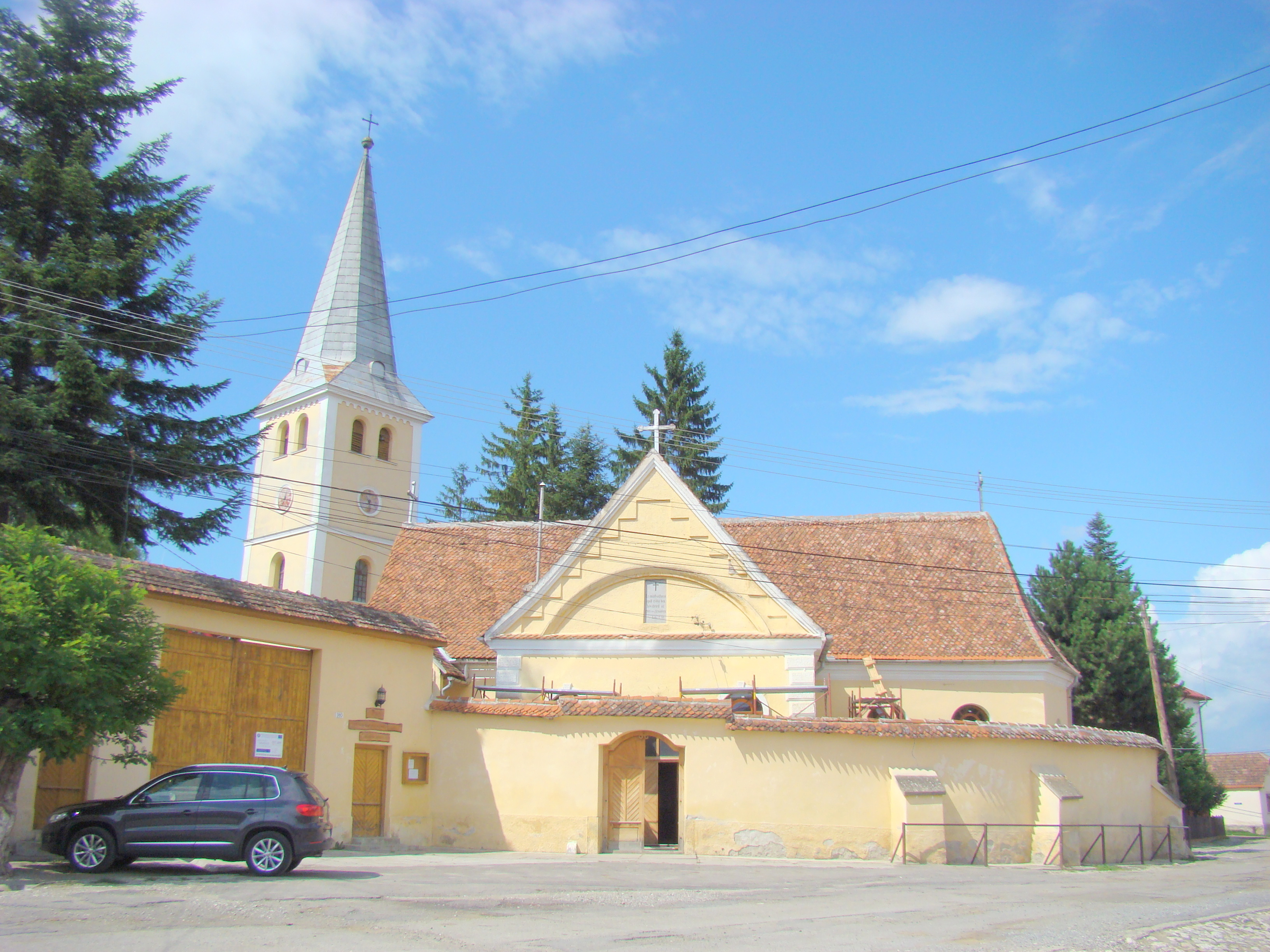
- Lutheran church in Apața

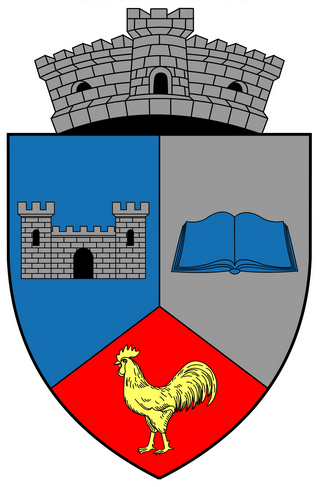
- Coat of arms

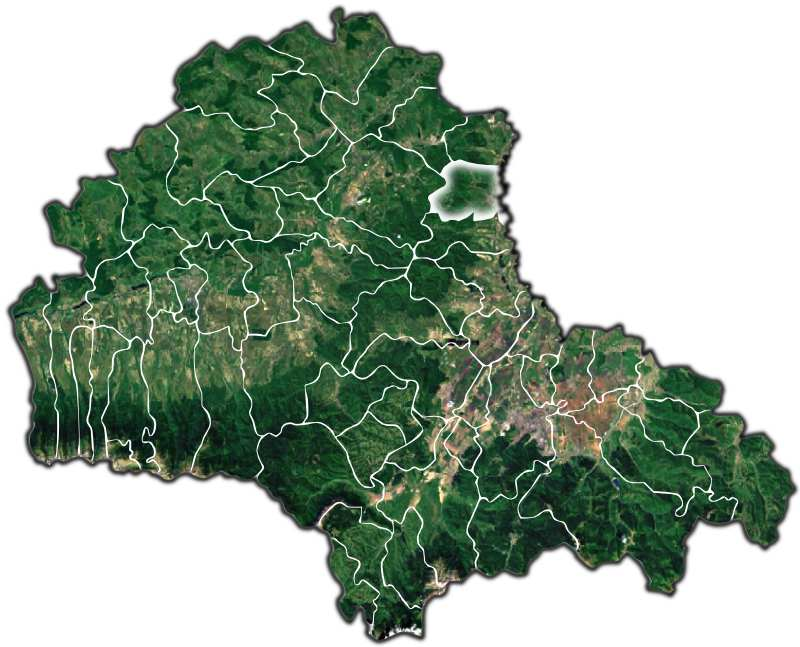
- Location within the county

- Location in Romania
- Coordinates: 45°57′N 25°31′E
- Country: Romania
- County: Brașov

Government
  - Mayor (2020–2024): György Drăgan (PNL)
- Area: 54.29 km^{2} (20.96 sq mi)
- Elevation: 525 m (1,722 ft)
- Population (2021-12-01): 3,275
  - Density: 60.32/km^{2} (156.2/sq mi)
- Time zone: UTC+02:00 (EET)
  - Summer (DST): UTC+03:00 (EEST)
- Postal code: 507005
- Area code: +(40) 02 68
- Vehicle reg.: BV
- Website: primaria-apata.ro

Apața (Hungarian: Apáca; German: Geist) is a commune in Brașov County, Romania. It is composed of a single village, Apața. It is situated in the traditional region of Transylvania.

== Geography ==
The commune is located in the north-central part of the county, at the extreme north of the Burzenland. It sits on the left bank of the Olt River; the Valea Lungă River discharges into the Olt near Apața.

The Apața train station serves Line 300 of the CFR network, which connects Bucharest with the Hungarian border near Oradea.

== Demographics ==
Historical population
Year	Pop.	±%
1910	1,930	—
1992	2,745	+42.2%
2002	2,995	+9.1%
2011	3,169	+5.8%
2021	3,275	+3.3%
Source: Census data

At the 2021 census, Apața had a population of 3,275; of those, 36.82% were Romanians, 28.61% Hungarians, and 24.58% Roma. At the 2011 census, the commune had 3,169 inhabitants; of those, 45.1% were Romanians, 36.8% Hungarians, and 17.9% Roma. At the 2002 census, 37.8% were Evangelical Lutheran, 36.4% Pentecostal, 20.1% Romanian Orthodox and 2.4% had no religion.

== Natives ==
- János Apáczai Csere (1625 – 1659), polyglot, pedagogist, philosopher, and theologian
