= Gyula Czimra =

Hungarian painter

- Born: 3 January 1901; Budapest, Austria-Hungary
- Died: 16 July 1966 (aged 65); Budapest, Hungarian People's Republic

Gyula Czimra (3 January 1901 – 16 July 1966) was a Hungarian painter, with works in the collection of Hungarian National Gallery, the Tornyai Museum of Hódmezővásárhely, the Rákospalota Museum and the Kiscell Museum.
