= Éva Tauszk =

Hungarian internist, candidate of medical sciences

- Born: November 16, 1924; Budapest, Hungary
- Died: October 2, 1967 (aged 42); Budapest, Hungary
- Occupation: internist

Éva Tauszk (November 16, 1924 – 2 October 1967) was a Hungarian internist, candidate of medical sciences.

She studied at the University of Szeged, and also in Budapest. From 1961 to 1963 she worked as an adjunct at Semmelweis University. She studied the genesis of heart attack, as well as endocrinological problems.

== Main work ==
- A szívizom-infarctus néhány kérdéséről: Kandidátusi értekezés. MTA, TMB Budapest, 1963.

== Sources ==
- Magyar életrajzi lexikon
- "Tauszk Éva". Petőfi Irodalmi Múzeum.
- Új magyar életrajzi lexikon
- Kapronczay Károly. "Magyar orvoséletrajzi lexikon". Digitális Tankönyvtár.
