= Porumbeni, Harghita =

Porumbeni Nagygalambfalva
- Commune
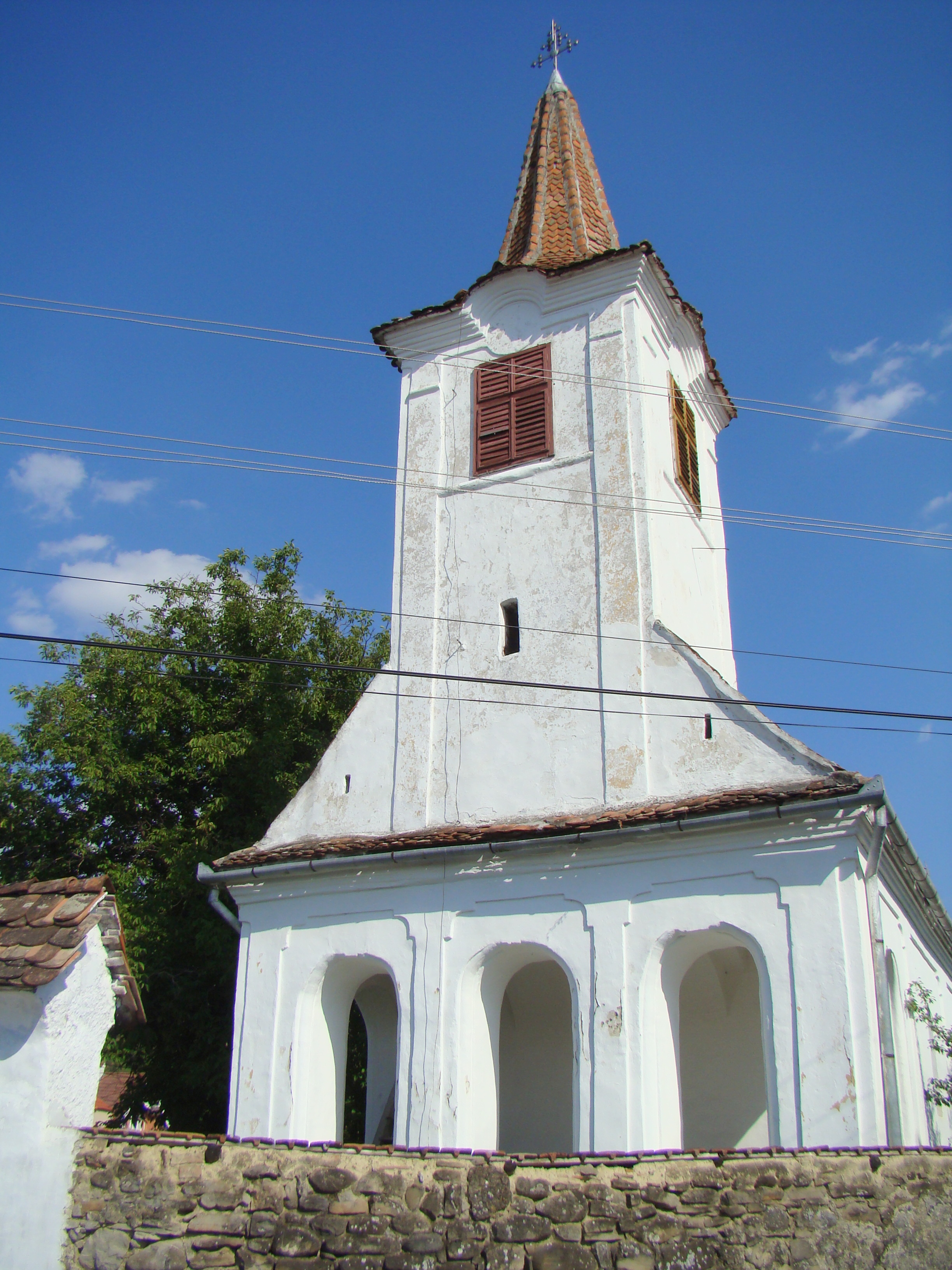
- Saint Nicholas Church in Porumbenii Mari

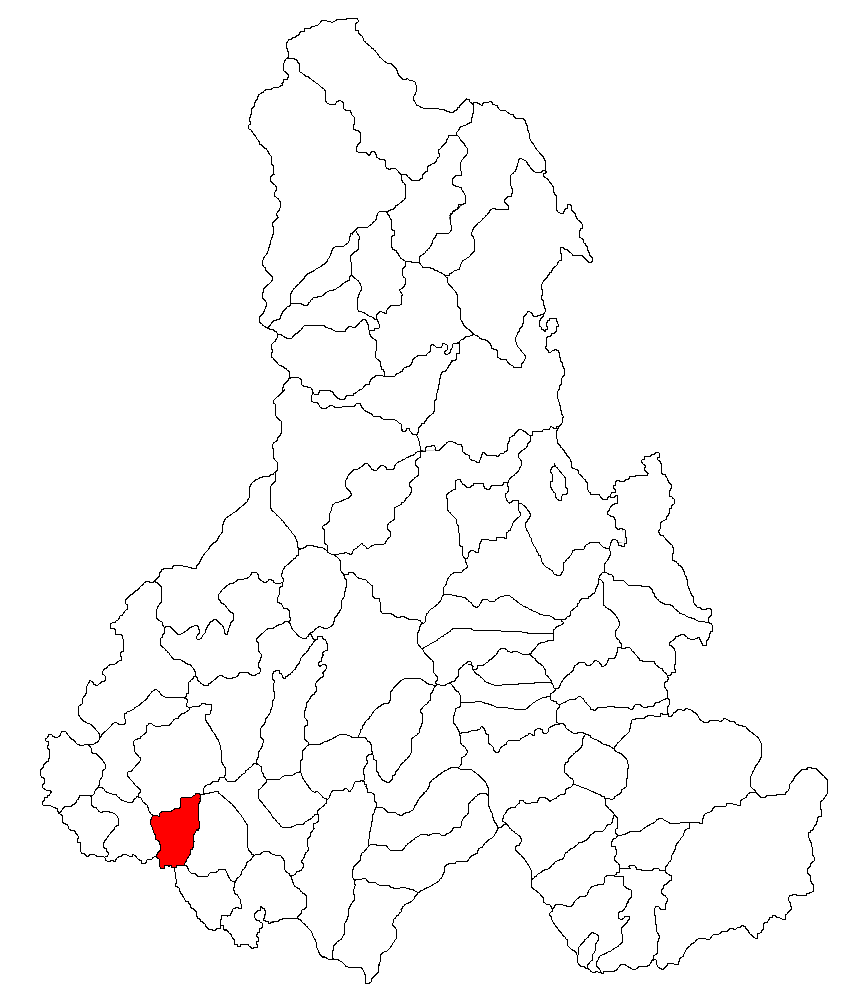
- Location in Harghita County

- Location in Romania
- Coordinates: 46°16′N 25°8′E
- Country: Romania
- County: Harghita

Government
  - Mayor (2020–2024): Levente Gyerkó (UDMR)
- Area: 40.87 km^{2} (15.78 sq mi)
- Population (2021-12-01): 1,800
  - Density: 44/km^{2} (110/sq mi)
- Time zone: UTC+02:00 (EET)
  - Summer (DST): UTC+03:00 (EEST)
- Postal code: 537214
- Area code: +40 x66
- Vehicle reg.: HR
- Website: www.primariaporumbeni.ro

Porumbeni (Hungarian: Nagygalambfalva [ˈnɒɟɡɒlɒnpfɒlvɒ]) is a commune in Harghita County, Romania. It lies in the Székely Land, an ethno-cultural region in eastern Transylvania, and is composed of two villages, Porumbenii Mari (the commune center; Nagygalambfalva) and Porumbenii Mici (Kisgalambfalva).

Porumbenii Mari is generally referred to as Galambfalva in Hungarian and was originally called Golumba Mare in Romanian.

The commune lies on the Transylvanian Plateau, on the banks of the Târnava Mare River. It is located in the southwestern part of the county, on the border with Mureș County. The nearest city is Odorheiu Secuiesc, 17 km (11 mi) to the east on county road DJ137C; the county seat, Miercurea Ciuc, is 69 km (43 mi) away.

== Demographics ==
Formerly part of Mugeni commune, the two villages broke off in 2004. At the 2011 census, 99.33% of inhabitants were Székely Hungarians and 0.51% Roma.

== History ==
The commune has attracted interest from archaeologists, who have uncovered numerous material proofs of human settlement in the area beginning in prehistory. Dacian pottery and ceramic fragments from the Bronze Age, the Age of Migrations, and the Middle Ages have been discovered in sites along the Áj and Nagy brooks. The archaeological record proves a settlement existed during the period of the Árpáds, but the current settlement was documented only in 1332.

The villages belonged first to the Székely seat of Udvarhelyszék, then, from 1876 until 1918, to Udvarhely County in the Kingdom of Hungary. In the aftermath of World War I and the Hungarian–Romanian War of 1918–1919, the village passed under Romanian administration; after the Treaty of Trianon of 1920, like the rest of Transylvania, it became part of the Kingdom of Romania. In 1940, the Second Vienna Award granted Northern Transylvania to Hungary and the village was held by Hungary until 1944. After Soviet occupation, the Romanian administration returned and the village became officially part of Romania in March 1945. Between 1952 and 1960, it formed part of the Magyar Autonomous Region, then, of the Mureș-Magyar Autonomous Region until it was abolished in 1968. Since then, the commune has been part of Harghita County. Its economy is based on agriculture and animal husbandry, with small sectors in milling flour, baking bread, and other commercial activities.

The medieval church, today used by the village's Hungarian Reformed community, first appeared in the papal annals of 1332–1337. An originally Gothic structure with elements from subsequent periods, the church's medieval features were largely destroyed during the reconstruction of the building in the eighteenth and nineteenth centuries.

== Natives ==
- Sándor Kányádi (1929–2018), poet and translator

== See also ==
- Dacian fortress of Porumbenii Mari
