= Vilma Beck =

Hungarian resistance fighter (1810–1851)

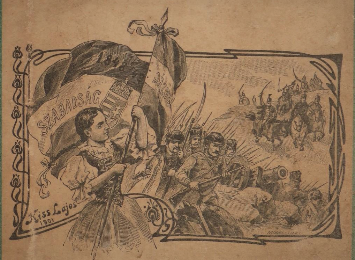
- Born: Vilma Horeczki; 1810
- Died: 1851 (aged 40–41); Birmingham, England
- Other name: Baroness Vilma Beck
- Occupations: Writer, freedom fighter

Vilma Beck (1810–1851) was a Hungarian writer and revolutionary in the Hungarian Revolution of 1848.

== Biography ==
The Horeczky family, which became Hungarian, came from a landowner and noble family in Nitra. Her original name was Vilma Horeczki, and Beckné after her husband.

Beck was active as a spy and agent in service of the Hungarian freedom fighters during the Revolution of 1848–1849, known as Racidula. At the same time, she also reported to the Austrian leadership. Later, she took the name Baroness Beck.

After the laying down of arms in Lzera, she emigrated and settled in London, England. She was also in the service of the London secret police but was arrested for extortion and died in custody in 1851 before the trial, after having been arrested for blackmail.

== Work ==
- Personal adventures during the late war of independence in Hungary, London, 1850. Two volumes (listed with the name Baroness Vilma Beck). Also published in German, French and Hungarian.
