= János Apáczai Csere =

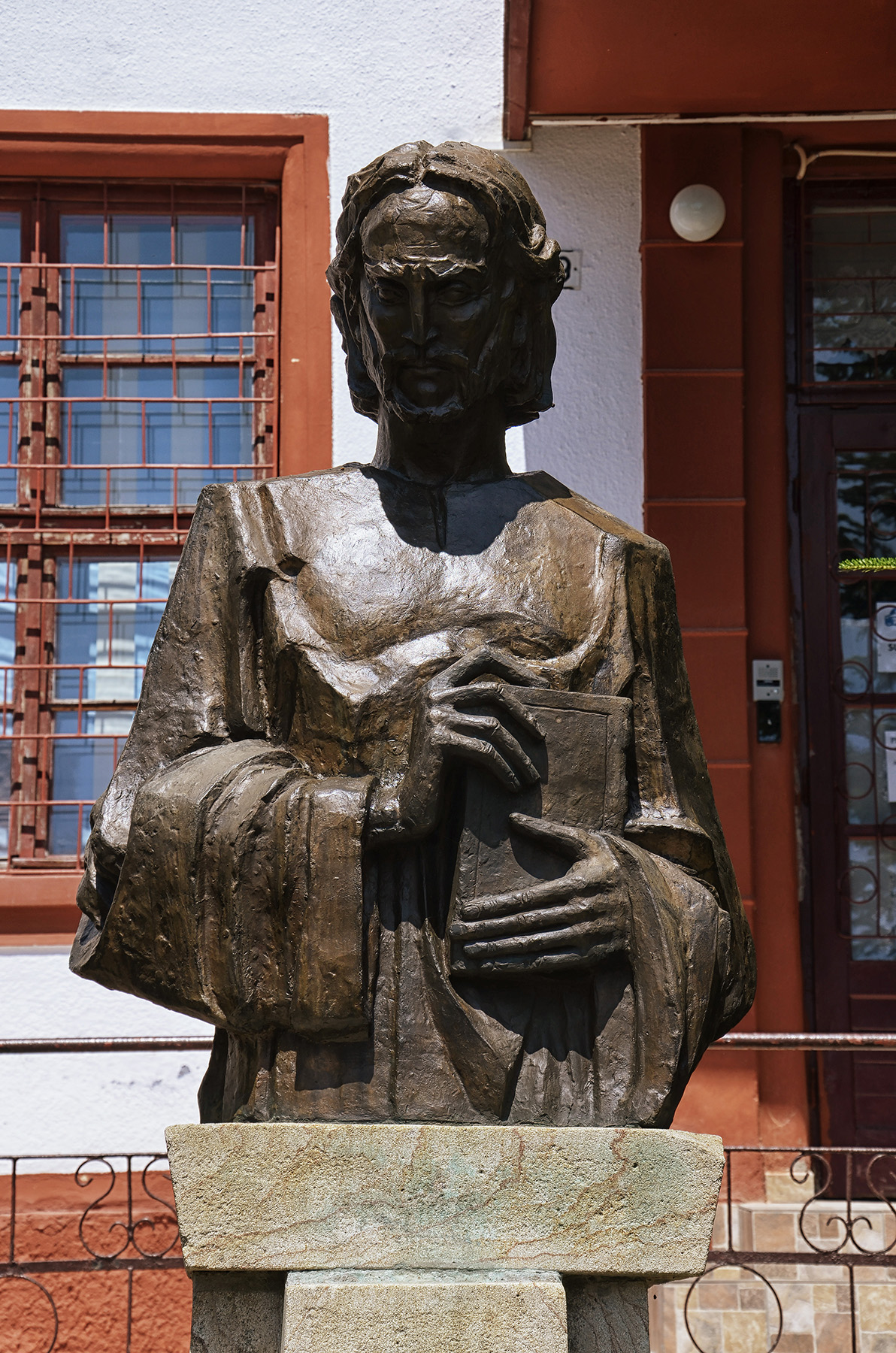
Statue of János Apáczai Csere in Apața

János Apáczai Csere (10 June 1625 – 31 December 1659) was a Hungarian polyglot, pedagogist, philosopher and theologian, famous for his work The Hungarian Encyclopedia, the first textbook to be written in Hungarian. The Encyclopædia Britannica calls him "the leading Protestant scholar and writer" of 17th-century Hungary.

== Life ==
He was born in Apáca, Principality of Transylvania (today Apața, in Brașov County, Romania) on 10 June 1625; the "Apáczai" in his name is an indication of his birthplace. The Csere family into which he was born were of the minor nobility. After college studies in Gyulafehérvár (Alba Iulia), one of Csere's teachers there, Johann Heinrich Bisterfeld, persuaded the local bishop, István Katona, to fund a scholarship for Apáczai to continue his education in the Netherlands. He began these studies at the University of Franeker and later went to Leiden University and Utrecht University; in 1651 he earned a doctorate in theology from the University of Harderwijk. He married a Dutch woman, Aletta van der Maet, in the same year, but returned with her to Gyulafehérvár in 1652 at the request of Prince George II Rákóczi. At this time, Bisterfeld was still head of the school in Gyulafehérvár, but on his death in 1655 Apáczai fell out of favor and lost his position; in 1656 he was sent instead to Kolozsvár (Cluj-Napoca) to become head of the Kolozsvár School there. He died in 1659 at the age of 34; he is buried in the city's Hajongard Cemetery.

== The Hungarian Encyclopedia ==
Apáczai wrote his encyclopedia while he was in Utrecht, and it was in Utrecht that it was published, in 1655 (with the year of 1653 printed on the frontispiece), after he had returned to Transylvania. The first part of the encyclopedia consisted of a translation of the philosophy of René Descartes, and the second and third covered logic following the earlier treatments of Petrus Ramus and his student William Ames. The fourth part concerned arithmetic, and the fifth part geometry, again based on the work of Ramus. The sixth part covered astronomy, and was notable for including controversial heliocentric theories of cosmology. The remaining parts of the encyclopedia concerned natural history, technology, history, social institutions, and theology. Apáczai's work fell into disfavor and neglect in the late 17th and early 18th centuries, after the Hungarian Counter-Reformation led to a return of Catholicism in that country. However, in 1803, a second edition was published, and it was republished again as recently as 1977 by Kriterion. Due to this work, Apáczai is now considered a national cultural hero.

== Legacy ==
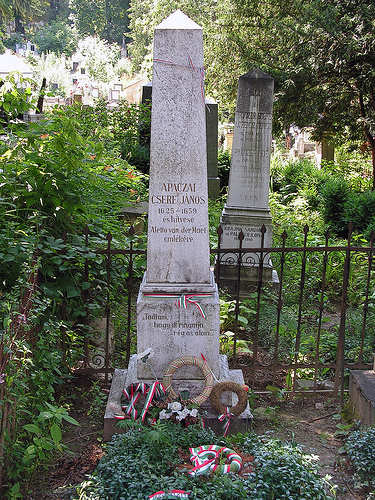
The tomb of Apáczai in Cluj-Napoca's Hajongard Cemetery

The Apáczai Csere János High School in Budapest, one of the most reputed high schools in Hungary, is named after Apáczai, as are the Apáczai Csere János High School in Cluj, the Apáczai Csere János Teacher-Training College in Győr, and Apáczai Csere János utca (a street in Budapest). In 1998, the Hungarian government established the Apáczai Public Foundation for the education of Hungarians living in other countries.
