= Antal K. Bejczy =

Hungarian scientist (1930–2015)

Antal (Tony) K. Bejczy
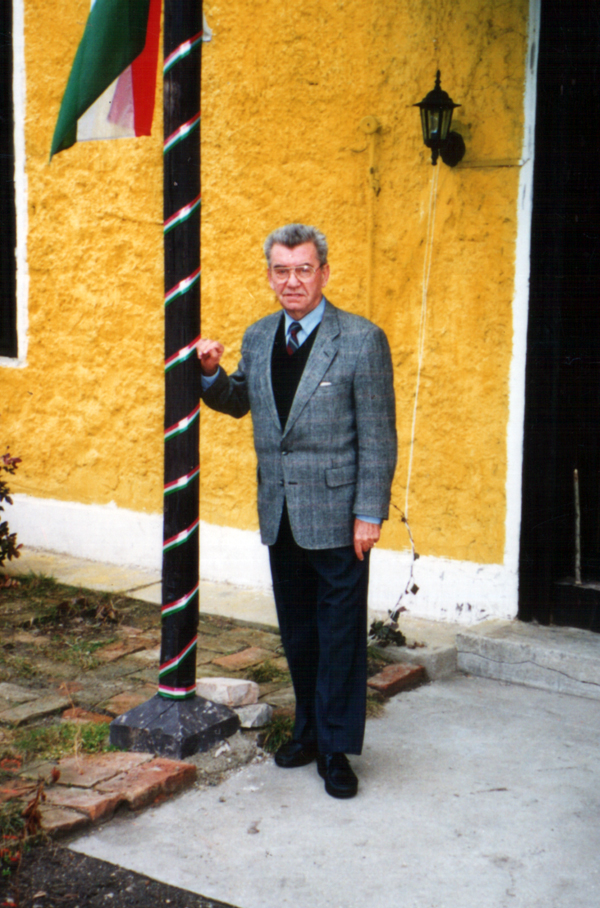
- Born: January 16, 1930; Ercsi, Hungary
- Died: June 25, 2015 (aged 85); Arcadia, California, US
- Education: Technical University of Budapest (BSc); University of Oslo (MSc, PhD)
- Scientific career
- Fields: Robotics

Antal K. Bejczy (January 16, 1930 – June 25, 2015) was a Hungarian scientist and a national of the United States known for his contributions to the field of robotic human–machine interfaces, particularly in enhancing automation. He served as an Affiliate Professor in Systems Science and Mathematics at Washington University in St. Louis.

== Life and education ==
Bejczy was born on 16 January, 1930, in Ercsi, Hungary. He earned his bachelor's degree in electrical engineering from the Technical University of Budapest in 1953, and after he left for Norway in 1956, proceeded to University of Oslo, where he had his MSc and PhD degrees in applied physics in 1963. He became an Affiliate Professor in Systems Science and Mathematics at Washington University in St. Louis.

== Career ==
Bejczy began working at the California Institute of Technology (CIT), where he stayed for three years working as a NATO/Fulbright Senior Research Fellow in 1966. In 1969, he joined Jet Propulsion Laboratory (JPL), and since 1971, has researched topics on robotics.

== Legacy and death ==
Bejczy won several awards including Jean Vertut Award and a Fellow of IEEE both in 1987, 1991 NASA Exceptional Service Medal. He also received the Széchenyi Awards in 1997 and 1998 and an honorary professor of the Bánki Donát Polytechnic, Budapest from 1999 till his retirement in 2001. He died in Pasadena in June 2015.
