= Oszkár Asboth =

Hungarian aircraft engineer (1891-1960)

- Asboth Oszkár Dezső Vilmos
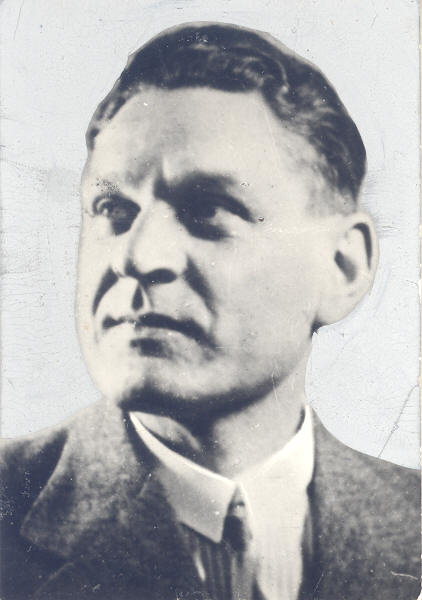
- Born: Oszkár Asboth; March 31, 1891; Pankota, Arad County, Kingdom of Hungary, Austria-Hungary
- Died: February 27, 1960 (aged 68); Budapest, Hungarian People's Republic
- Other names: Oskar Asboth
- Employer: First Aircraft Works Albertfalva

Oszkár Asboth, also rendered as Asbóth and Oskar (von) Asboth, (31 March 1891 in Pankota, Austro-Hungarian Monarchy (today Pâncota, Romania) – 27 February 1960 in Budapest) was an ethnic Hungarian aviation engineer sometimes credited with the invention of the helicopter. His machine used stacked counterrotating propellers; Asboth never solved the problem of in-flight stability, this was left to others.

He was born the son of Terézia Horváth and Gyula Asboth, a forester. He descended from Lajos Asbóth, known from the 1848-49 Revolution and War of Independence. He completed his secondary school education in Arad. From a youthful age, he began to explore the possibilities of human flight. After completing his studies, he worked as an aeronautical engineer in Arad, Szabadka and then in Vienna between 1909 and 1913. He built an experimental unmanned flying motorcycle-towed experimental airplane-like kite structure, with which he made several successful flights.

In 1918, in Budapest, he married Hedvig Geyer. For his military service he was sent to the propeller development facility of Fischamend. During the First World War, he was involved in the selection of propellers for various aero engines. He had a clear understanding of the principles involved in propeller development and production and was soon able to patent his own design for straight-edged, more efficient propellers, which could also be manufactured more simply.

Asboth's design was successful, and his propellers were used by several airplane types in the First World War. From 1918, Asboth's propellers were mass-produced in the First Propeller Works at Albertfalva, next to the Austro-Hungarian Monarchy's biggest aircraft-manufacturing plant, under Asboth's supervision until the collapse of the monarchy. After the war, a new propeller works, the "Express" Works, was built, which, until 1922 because of the aviation ban, mostly produced propellers for aircraft and boats. After the ban was lifted this company became the Oszkár Asboth Aircraft Factory and began manufacturing in Budapest their patent light wooden car bodies, aeroplanes and propellers. The fuselages for Lajos Rotter's FEIRO-1 and for the Lampich L-1 flown by amateur pilots of the technical university were built here.

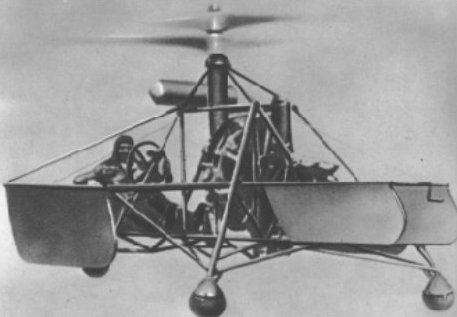
The AH-4 helicopter in flight

In 1928, Asboth followed up the earlier experimental work on vertical take-off aircraft, carried out during World War I by Petróczy, Kármán and Zurovec. The original prototypes carried a car for an observer and allowed rapid vertical flight using tethering cables to hold them in position and aid stability.

The aim of his experiments was to develop the device attached to a rope that was released into an aircraft that could fly freely through the air. Over the two years of experimentation the two large wooden propellers - positioned one above the other and rotating in opposite directions - managed to raise Asboth's device into the air together with its pilot more than 250 times and for periods of almost one hour.

Because of their rigid propellers Asboth's "helicopters" became unstable when moving forward or when subjected to a strong side wind. Despite these limitations, these are considered to be among the first successful helicopter flights recorded.

He was director of Austria's Central Experimental Station.

In Hungary, Asboth also experimented with automobiles powered by propellers. Due to a structural defect. this experiment resulted in a fatal accident, for which Asboth was considered to be responsible and as a result he was condemned. Following this set-back, Asboth took advantage of his outstanding international reputation and was able to continue his experimental work on helicopters, working for French, English and German companies.

He moved to the UK before the start of the Second World War.

In 1941, he left Germany and returned to Hungary, where he experimented on boats powered by aircraft propellers and contributed to scientific journals. He continued this work after 1945 and worked as an expert for Innovations Implementation Company until his death. For his work on the development of aircraft propellers and his experimental work in general he received several Hungarian and international awards. He died in Budapest at the age of 68.

== Aircraft ==
- Asboth 1908 biplane
- Asboth AH-1
- Asboth AH-2
- Asboth AH-3
- Asboth AH-4
