= Péter Doszpot =

Hungarian politician

Péter Doszpot (born 4 December 1962, in Debrecen) was a Hungarian Member of Parliament and a member of Hungarian Socialist Party. After the elections in 2002, he was working as the vice president of Parliament's policing committee. Formerly, he was one of the most famous policemen working on high-profile murder cases in Hungary. He was often referred to as the "starcop". His nephew's biographical book about him was published in 2001.

== Personal life ==
He is married and has two sons, Márk and Gergő.
