= Toldi =

Toldi may refer to:

- Toldi (tank), Hungarian light tank
- Toldi trilogy, epic poem trilogy written by the Hungarian poet János Arany
- Miklós Toldi (1320–1390), Hungarian nobleman
