= Riedl =

Riedl or Riedle is a surname of German origin, derived from the Middle Low German rīden, meaning ‘to ride’. People with the surname Riedl include:

- Alessandro Riedle (born 1991), German footballer
- Alfred Riedl (1949–2020), Austrian football manager
- André Riedl (1940–2023), Canadian politician
- Emma Riedl, interwar-era German newspaper editor
- Erich Riedl (1933–2018), German politician
- Frigyes Riedl (1856–1921), Hungarian essayist and historian
- Harald Udo von Riedl (born 1936), Austrian botanist and mycologist
- Johannes Riedl (1950–2010), German footballer
- John T. Riedl (1962–2013), American computer scientist
- Josef Anton Riedl (1929–2016), German composer
- Karl-Heinz Riedle (born 1965), German footballer
- Rupert Riedl (1925–2005), Austrian zoologist
- Thomas Riedl (born 1976), German footballer

== See also ==
- Riedel, a similar German surname
