= Arany-album =

Studio album by Dalriada
- Released: 28 September 2009
- Genre: Folk metal
- Length: 75:08
- Language: Hungarian
- Label: Hammer Music/Nail Records

Dalriada chronology
Szelek (2008)	Arany-album (2009)	Ígéret (2011)

Professional ratings
Review scores
Source	Rating
Hard Rock Magazin	(8/10)
Kronos Mortus	(10/10)
Passzio.hu	favourable
Crusade of Metal	(95%)
viharock.hu	favourable
zene.hu	favourable

Arany-Album is the sixth studio album of the Hungarian folk metal band Dalriada. The tracks are musicalized versions of popular works by János Arany. It won the 2009 HangSúly Hungarian Metal Awards out of 70 contestants and peaked at position 4 in the Hungarian Mahasz official charts.

== Track listing ==
1. "Zách Klára"
2. "János pap országa"
3. "Bor vitéz"
4. "Ágnes asszony 1"
5. "Ágnes asszony 2"
6. "Szent László 1"
7. "Szent László 2"
8. "A walesi bárdok 1"
9. "A walesi bárdok 2"
10. "A walesi bárdok 3"
11. "A rab gólya "
12. "Szondi két apródja 1"
13. "Szondi két apródja 2"

== Personnel ==
- Laura Binder – vocals, violin
- András Ficzek – vocals, guitars
- István Molnár – bass
- Barnabás Ungár – keyboards
- Mátyás Németh-Szabó – guitar
- Tadeusz Rieckmann – drums

== Sources ==
- Arany-album is out now - Zenemagazin.com
- Dalriada: Arany-album - Zene.hu
- Dalriada: Arany-album - Fémforgács.hu
