= The Princess and the Goblin (film) =

1991 animated film by József Gémes

- Theatrical release poster
- Directed by: József Gémes
- Screenplay by: Robin Lyons
- Based on: The Princess and the Goblin by George MacDonald
- Produced by: Robin Lyons
- Starring: Joss Ackland; Claire Bloom; Roy Kinnear; Sally Ann Marsh; Rik Mayall; Peggy Mount; Peter Murray; Victor Spinetti; Mollie Sugden; Frank Rozelaar Green; William Hootkins; Maxine Howe; Steve Lyons; Robin Lyons
- Edited by: Magda Hap
- Music by: István Lerch
- Production companies: Pannonia Film Studio; Siriol Animation; S4C Wales; NHK Enterprises International
- Distributed by: Budapest Film (Hungary); Entertainment Film Distributors (United Kingdom); Hemdale Film Corporation (United States)
- Release dates: 20 December 1991 (Hungary); 18 December 1992 (United Kingdom)
- Running time: 82 minutes
- Countries: Hungary; United Kingdom; Japan
- Language: English
- Budget: $10 million
- Box office: $2,105,078

The Princess and the Goblin (Hungarian: A hercegnő és a kobold) is a 1991 animated fantasy film directed by József Gémes and written by Robin Lyons, an adaptation of George MacDonald's 1872 novel of the same name.

When a peaceful kingdom is menaced by an army of monstrous goblins, a princess joins forces with a miner boy to rescue the king and all his people. The pair must battle the evil power of the wicked goblin prince armed only with the gift of song, the miracle of love, and a magical shimmering thread.

== Plot ==
In a mountainous kingdom, the widowed King leaves to attend affairs of the state, leaving his daughter, Princess Irene, with her nursemaid. When Irene is on an outing, she becomes lost in a forest. Deformed animals corner her until a strange singing drives them away. The singing is a young boy, Curdie, the son of a miner, who informs her that the monsters were goblins and are driven away by singing. Everyone except the King (who believed them to be just old miners tales) and his family know of the goblins.

The next day, Irene discovers a magical secret door in her bedroom. She ventures into a tower and meets the spirit of her Great-Great-Grandmother, also called Irene. Grandmother informs the young princess that she will soon be in grave danger. The same day, Curdie and his father are in the mines, and Curdie falls through a pothole and into the realm of the goblins. Hidden, he follows the goblins to a vast cavern where the Goblin King and malevolent Goblin Queen are announcing their scheme to flood the mines and drown humans. Prince Froglip, the spoiled and infantile heir to the goblin throne, states that the humans exiled the goblins underground centuries ago and now they plan to get revenge.

Curdie escapes and warns his father, who then plans to investigate the goblin kingdom himself. Instead, Curdie sneaks out that night and returns to the goblin realm to find out more about their plans, hearing Froglip's plan is that he shall abduct the Princess and marry her, thereby forcing the humans to accept the goblins as their rulers. However, the goblins discover him and trap him in a makeshift dungeon. That same night, Irene follows a magic invisible thread given to her by her grandmother, and are led to Curdie. Irene frees Curdie and together they escape the goblins. The miners are warned of the flooding plan and begin erecting supports to keep the tunnels free of water.

The goblins launch their attack on the castle from a hidden tunnel and quickly gain the upper hand. After Curdie shows the people of the kingdom how to fight the goblins — namely, by stomping their feet and singing — they manage to successfully chase them out of the castle. However, as the goblins retreat, they unleash the floodwaters in a last-ditch effort to wipe out the humans.

Curdie realizes that if the miners are successful, the water will have nowhere to go but up and end up flooding the castle. He tries to get everyone to leave and finds Irene being held captive by Froglip. At that moment, the floodwaters arrive and wash them to the ramparts. Curdie and Irene are on the edge and Froglip shows up to get Irene. With Irene's help, Curdie is able to knock Froglip off of the castle to his demise, saving the kingdom. As the water recedes, the people of the kingdom celebrate their victory in song.

== Cast ==
Character	Hungarian voice actor	English voice actor
Princess Irene	Edina Somlai	Sally Ann Marsh
Curdie	Péter Minárovits	Peter Murray & Paul Keating
Prince Froglip	Zoltán Bezerédi	Rik Mayall
Great-Great-Grandmother Irene	Ilona Kállay	Claire Bloom
Lootie	Ilona Győri	Mollie Sugden
Glump	Lajos Kránitz	Victor Spinetti
Goblin King	József Kautzky	Robin Lyons
Goblin Queen	Éva Schubert	Peggy Mount
Peter (Curdie's Father)	István Perlaki	William Hootkins
Curdie's Mother	Mari Némedi	Maxine Howe
King Papa (Irene's Father)	István Avar	Joss Ackland
Mump	István Pathó	Roy Kinnear

== Production ==
The Princess and the Goblin was the first animated feature from Wales, and the 25th full-length cartoon from Hungary. The film was produced by the Welsh television station S4C, and the Cardiff-based Siriol studio, along with Hungary's Pannonia and Japan's NHK. Costing $10 million, the film teamed producer/screenwriter Robin Lyons with director József Gémes (from 1975's Hugo the Hippo, 1982's Heroic Times and 1988's Willy the Sparrow). Most of the principal animation was produced at the Siriol facilities.

== Release ==
Originally released in late 1991 in Hungary, it was released in 1992 and 1993 across Europe. The Princess and the Goblin was picked up for North American release by Hemdale Communications for a summer release in 1994. The film was a critical and commercial failure, only grossing US$2.1 million from 795 venues, being overshadowed by the release of The Lion King. Coincidentally, this film's star Rik Mayall had been asked by Tim Rice to audition for The Lion King for the roles of Banzai, Zazu and Timon.

== Reception ==
Halliwell's Film Guide deemed it an "Uninteresting animated feature, with a dull fairy-tale plot dully executed." The New York Times wrote "If 'The Princess and the Goblin' is mildly diverting children's fare, its characters are not sharply focused visually or verbally. In a cinema that teems with terrifying monsters, the goblins appear to be ineffectual and unmenacing even when they are on the warpath."

Rita Kempley of the Washington Post wrote that the movie set a standard as far beneath that of Aladdin.

In a desperate attempt to counter its bad reviews, Hemdale asked several movie critics to view the film with their children and asked those children for their comments on the film; these were subsequently included in its newspaper promotion. Mentioned in the advertisements were Michael Medved's daughter, Sarah, and Bob Campbell's four-year-old daughter ("It gets 91 stars!"). The idea came from Hemdale executives who thought animated films from the Disney company were preferred over those from other studios.

The Princess and the Goblin received a Seal of Approval from the Dove Foundation, and the Film Advisory Board's Award of Excellence. It also won the Best Children's Film Award at the Fort Lauderdale International Film Festival.

== Home media ==
Hemdale Home Video premiered the movie on VHS sometime after its theatrical outing. The home video release included an advertisement in which an actress portraying Irene's grandmother offered children an emergency pre-paid phone card. The card would allow children who were lost or in danger to make use of payphones to call for help, and also hear recorded messages from characters containing safety tips and advice.

It was released on DVD on 15 August 2005 by Allumination FilmWorks.

== See also ==
- List of animated feature-length films
- List of Welsh films
- List of American films
- The Last Unicorn – a 1982 animated film
- The Black Cauldron – a 1985 animated Disney film
- The Little Mermaid – a 1989 animated Disney film
- Beauty and the Beast – a 1991 animated Disney film
- Aladdin – a 1992 animated Disney film
- The Thief and the Cobbler – a 1995 animated film
- Quest for Camelot – a 1998 animated Warner Bros. film
