= Watson Kirkconnell =

Canadian translator and scholar (1895–1977)

- Born: 16 May 1895; Port Hope, Ontario, Canada
- Died: 26 February 1977 (aged 81); Wolfville, Nova Scotia, Canada
- Awards: Order of Canada

Watson Kirkconnell OC FRSC (16 May 1895 – 26 February 1977) was a Canadian literary scholar, poet, playwright, linguist, satirist, and translator.

Kirkconnell was born in Port Hope, Ontario into a Scottish-Canadian family descended from United Empire Loyalists and more recent immigrants from the British Isles. After his university studies were interrupted by the outbreak of World War I, Captain Watson Kirkconnell was extremely disappointed to be classified as medically unfit for active service when he was only days away from being shipped to the Western Front with the Canadian Corps. He instead spent the rest of the war guarding Central Powers POWs at Fort Henry and Kapuskasing internment camps in rural Ontario.

Following the 1918 Armistice, he entered a university faculty career and became an internationally known poet, translator of poetry, and literary critic. After learning enormously from what he taught about world literature to his students, Kirkconnell made significant teaching innovations and also became an influential public intellectual, who publicized and denounced human rights abuses under Fascism, Nazism, and Stalinism.

For his translations of their national poetry and "New Canadian" poets who composed in immigrant languages, Kirkconnell remains well known in Iceland, Poland, Hungary, the former Yugoslavia, and Ukraine. For his original poetry, verse dramas, and light operas, Kirkconnell drew upon both Canadian and world history and while emulating poets and playwrights from throughout World Literature. He was also a highly skilled satirist, as seen in his verse parodies of Robert Burns and, in "Rain on the Waste Land", of T.S. Eliot.

Due to his arguments against what he came to see as the excessive Anglocentrism of his country and its culture and his use of the tapestry and mosaic metaphors in favor of embracing a multiethnic and multilingual Canadian culture, Kirkconnell was credited by his friend, collaborator in translating Ukrainian literature and poetry, and university colleague C.H. Andrusyshen with almost singlehandedly ending widespread discrimination against Canadians of White ethnic (meaning non-White Anglo-Saxon Protestant) ancestry and cultural identity. He has accordingly been dubbed the father of multiculturalism in Canada.

He was also, paradoxically, very eccentric, a life-long conspiracy theorist, and believer in the pseudosciences of eugenics and scientific racism. Even more paradoxically, Kirkconnell was an anti-Semite as a young man and again as an old man, when he embraced Holocaust denial under the influence of conspiracy theorist William Guy Carr; but in the intervening period he regularly made and published literary translations of verse he admired by Jewish poets. Furthermore, while Kirkconnell was hesitant to condemn Nazism in May 1939, he changed his mind and used his many literary contacts to help mobilize Canadian immigrant communities in favour of the Allied war effort. Furthermore, in 1943 he eulogized the victims of the Holocaust in a poem entitled "Agony of Israel" and in 1962 he mocked both Soviet and Nazi ideology in a Greek tragedy-style stage play about the Exodus.

At the same time, similarly to American and Canadian veterans of the International Brigades during the Spanish Civil War, who were often vilified for being "premature anti-Fascists" after returning home, Kirkconnell was similarly vilified, not only by Soviet journalists and politicians, but even by Canadian ones, for being a "premature anti-Stalinist". Even so, he continued to write and speak publicly about Soviet war crimes, religious persecution, the Holodomor, and other human rights abuses, and what he saw as the domestic threat posed by both the pro-Soviet Communist Party of Canada and the covert operations of the KGB and GRU on Canadian soil. During the Second World War, Prime Minister William Lyon Mackenzie King seriously considered acting to protect Canada's military alliance with the USSR by silencing Kirkconnell with an order in council. Only after the 1945 defection of Soviet military intelligence officer Igor Gouzenko did the Canadian government and it's counterintelligence services begin taking Kirkconnell's claims seriously and decide to recruit him as a covert informant. Even so, Kirkconnell was also a very harsh critic of U.S. Senator Joseph McCarthy, whom he accused of having discredited anti-communism by acting in, "an offensive and blundering fashion."

Even though Kirkconnell's pioneering vision for multiculturalism was intended to make his country less Anglocentric and more accepting only of Canadians who spoke immigrant languages and had ancestral roots in European nations other than Great Britain, the concept has been widened before and since his death to also acknowledge the cultural contributions of First Nation peoples and other non-Whites.

One of his most popular literary translations from Hungarian literature is of János Arany's The Bards of Wales, an 1864 ballad criticizing the conquest of Wales by King Edward Longshanks, but which was intended as a covert denunciation of Emperor Franz Joseph over the defeat of the Hungarian revolution of 1848, and which Kirkconnell translated into the same idiom as the Child ballads. Furthermore, Watson Kirkconnell's 1933 translation of World War I soldier-poet Géza Gyóni's iconic anti-war poem, Csak egy éjszakára ("For Just One Night"), which was composed during the Siege of Przemyśl in 1915 and flown out of the besieged city by aeroplane for publication in Budapest, which Kirkconnell rendered into the same idiom as English war poets Siegfried Sassoon, Wilfred Owen, and Isaac Rosenberg, remains just as popular.

== Family background ==
Watson Kirkconnell's paternal ancestors derived their surname from the village and ruined monastery of Kirkconnel. They were Presbyterians, spoke Galwegian Gaelic, wore the Clan Douglas tartan, and farmed near Kirkcudbright, in Dumfries and Galloway. Due to what Kirkconnell later dubbed, "the almost universal holocaust of Scottish archives during the Reformation", his genealogy could not be traced with complete accuracy or linked, as he strongly suspected was the case, to a cadet branch of the Clan Douglas or Clan Maxwell lairds of Kirkconnel. Kirkconnell's own visit to his ancestral village inspired his original poem "Kirkconnell, Galloway, A.D. 600. Visited A.D. 1953". The poet pondered how much the culture of the region and the celebration of Christmas Day had changed since Kirkconnell Abbey was founded by St. Conal, a Culdee monk and missionary of the Celtic Church. The landscape, he commented, remained largely unchanged and called upon his readers to embrace the awe that their ancestors had once felt before the incarnation and birth of Jesus Christ.

In, "an almost imperceptible little ripple in the vast tide of Scottish immigration that flowed into Canada", Walter Kirkconnell (1795–1860), the poet's great-grandfather, sailed for the New World in 1819 and settled as a pioneer in Chatham Township, Argenteuil County, Quebec. As a result of a 1953 search made at Kirkconnell's request by the Scottish Council, he learned that everyone named Kirkconnell had similarly joined the Scottish diaspora and that no one with the same surname still lived in Scotland.

At the time, Chatham Township was largely being settled by Gaelic-speaking evictees and voluntary immigrants from Perthshire (Scottish Gaelic: Siorrachd Pheairt). Walter Kirkconnell accordingly married one of them; Mary McCallum, the daughter of John and Janet (née McDiarmid) McCallum, from the farmhouse known as "Carnban" in what is now a ruined and completely depopulated village in Glen Lyon (Scottish Gaelic: Gleann Lìomhann). Reformed worship in Chatham Township continued the 16th-century practice of exclusive and unaccompanied Gaelic psalm singing in a form known as precenting the line. In her old age, Mary (née McCallum) Kirkconnell, despite having gone blind, could still sing all 154 Scottish Gaelic Metrical Psalms from memory.

Kirkconnell's maternal great-grandfather, Christopher Watson, emigrated from Alston, Cumberland to Upper Canada in 1819 and became a schoolmaster in York, later renamed Toronto. Christopher's youngest son, Thomas Watson, had adopted his father's profession and taught at the schools in Allanburg, Beachwood, Lundy's Lane, Stamford, and Port Hope, Ontario. In 1851, Thomas Watson had married Margaret Elma Green of Lundy's Lane, a woman descended from Welsh-American United Empire Loyalists, as well as more recent British immigrants to Canada with both German and Spanish roots.

Kirkconnell's parents, Thomas Kirkconnell (1862–1934) and Bertha (née Watson) Kirkconnell (1867–1957), were living in Port Hope, Ontario when their earliest children were born.

== Early life ==
Watson Kirkconnell was born on 16 May 1895 in Port Hope, Ontario, where his father, Thomas Kirkconnell, was headmaster of Port Hope High School. Kirkconnell was a sickly child and was accordingly delayed entry for two years into Port Hope Public School and only began taking classes at the age of seven. Despite the delays, Kirkconnell proved to be very academically gifted pupil and was twice allowed to skip a grade.

Kirkconnell later credited his love of poetry to the influence of his maternal grandfather, Thomas Watson, who he later described as a, "grey-bearded... pillar of the local Methodist church". Thomas Watson used to reward his grandson by giving him one cent for every stanza he memorized from Divine and Moral Songs by Isaac Watts. Kirkconnell later recalled, "From an entire volume thus committed to memory, I gained considerable cash, indelible recollections of many edifying verses, and an indelible love of prosody. Neither of us dreamt that back of several of Watts' poems lay the fine Latin hymns of the Polish Jesuit Kazimierz Sarbiewski (1595-1640)."

Kirkconnell further recalled that his "first awareness of small town journalism came" after his "second Christmas-time promotion". The Port Hope Guide reported that "a local lawyer" had angrily protested during a school board meeting that his son has not been similarly promoted and accused Watson Kirkconnell of having been "shoved", solely because his father was the headmaster of Port Hope High School. For this reason, the Kirkconnell family felt both vindicated and overjoyed the following summer, after the same newspaper published the results of the Provincial "Entrance Examinations". These proved that the headmaster's controversial son had scored, "nearly fifty points higher than anyone else in town or county."

At the age of twelve, Kirkconnell asked for and received both baptism and membership in the Port Hope Baptist Church. According to J.M.R. Beveridge, "Thus began his commitment to Christianity which, although subjected to periods of doubt, sometimes perhaps even approaching despair, survived and matured. Throughout his adult life he played an active and on many occasions leading role in the Baptist denomination." Kirkconnell, however, seriously considered leaving the Baptist faith as a young man, and as an older man was far more ecumenical and critical in his approach to Evangical Christianity than many of his Baptist peers were comfortable with. For example, writing in his memoirs that Evangelicals who "ignorantly or deliberately disregard Zoroastrian elements in early Hebrew thinking... are noisy without knowledge" and expressing "more love for poetry than theology."

Also as a child in Port Hope, Kirkconnell's interest in geology was sparked by attending a lecture about local prehistory, Ice Age glaciers, and the Glacial Lake Iroquois by Arthur Philemon Coleman, who was visiting from the University of Toronto. Afterwards, Kirkconnell recalls, "walking and cycling through the countryside now took on a new meaning", and after the family moved to Lindsay, Ontario in 1908, Kirkconnell continued to research local prehistory and how it had shaped the landscape.

By the time he graduated high school, Kirkconnell had learned Latin, French, German, and Greek, and had been exposed to works of comparative philology. He later wrote, "The labours of my lifetime have been more in the field of language study than in any other."

In 1913, at the urging of his father, Kirkconnell began studies at his father's alma mater of Queen's University at Kingston. Even though mathematics had been his best subject in high school, Kirkconnell proceeded to honours in Classics and graduated as a double medallist in Latin and Greek. He received a Master of Arts degree in 1916.

== World War I ==
On 4 August 1914, Kirkconnell was attending Queen's University at the outbreak of World War I. Although he enthusiastically hoped to see combat in France, Kirkconnell chose, similarly to J.R.R. Tolkien, to delay enlistment until after his graduation.

His brother, Walter Kirkconnell, enlisted in the Royal Montreal Regiment on 5 August 1914. After training in the mud of Salisbury Plain, Lt. Walter Kirkconnell was killed in action during the Battle of Amiens on 8 August 1918, when the Canadian Corps platoon under his command ran into a German machine gun nest in a grain field near Villers-Bretonneux.

In August 1916, Kirkconnell volunteered for active service on the Western Front. In November 1916, however, despite having been personally requested by Major P.G.C. Campbell and shortly before he was to be shipped overseas with the 253rd Battalion, Captain Kirkconnell was ruled unfit for combat duty by three successive Medical Boards.

A deeply disappointed Captain Watson Kirkconnell spent the rest of the war guarding POWs and civilian internees at Fort Henry and at Kapuskasing internment camp, both in rural Ontario. In his words, "The great majority of the prisoners were Slovaks, Ruthenians, and Poles. There were also a hundred Turks, a few Bulgars, a Magyar or two, and a handful of genuine Austrians. Ignorant, sullen, inert, the mass of these interns were the very incarnation of passive resistance ... there prevailed among all these hundreds of thick heads a strange belief that for every day of their captivity they would receive at the close of the war an indemnity of five dollars wrung from Canada by a victorious Austria ... guarding them was something of a sinecure."

While serving as camp paymaster at Kapuskasing, Captain Watson Kirkconnell helped prevent a prisoner uprising and, on two occasions, he also discovered and foiled attempts to tunnel out of the camp.

Despite his many later translations of French Canadian literature and poetry, during the war years Kirkconnell was adamant that no “French Catholic curs” be allowed into Prime Minister Robert Borden’s cabinet, adding “I used to think that Aunt Jane might be exaggerating in her denunciation of the French but we know Quebec now. Colonel Date calls them ‘the cockroaches of Canada’ and he is not far out.” He also urged his mother and sister "to take advantage of the Wartime Election Act to vote in the ... Union election 'against Frenchmen, Catholicism, and the abandonment of all national honour.'"

During the fall of 1919, Captain Kirkconnell accompanied 445 POWs and internees from Fort Henry and Kapuskasing internment camp aboard the S.S. Pretorian, from Quebec City to Rotterdam, pending their repatriation to the Weimar Republic. Kirkconnell later recalled, after surrendering his prisoners to the neutral Dutch armed forces, "That they bore me no ill will for my performance at Fort Henry and Kapuskasing seemed clear when on the wharf my former prisoners called for, 'Three cheers for Captain Kirkconnell', and gave them lustily."

Despite years of grief over the combat death of his brother, Watson Kirkconnell later wrote, "Generally speaking, I could feel little animus against our German prisoners. Guarding them was simply a job. It was their duty to try to get away and our duty to prevent it. The ingenuity that they displayed in their attempts to escape was being duplicated by our men in German captivity."

== Interwar period ==
Kirkconnell was first sworn into Freemasonry in Canada in December 1920 at the "Faithful Brethren" Lodge No. 77 in Lindsay, Ontario. He remained in "The Craft" for the rest of his life and even served as Grand Master of St. George's Lodge No. 20 of the York Rite in Wolfville, Nova Scotia, Kirkconnell later experienced some doubt about the organization, as his subsequent research made him realize that Freemasonry's legend of the murder of Hiram Abif is contradicted by the Antiquities of the Jews by Josephus. Kirkconnell later wrote, "I turned to books on the Craft itself, and found that most of its ritual lecture material was composed in England in the 18th century by Dr. James Anderson, Dr. J.T. Desaguliers, George Payne, and William Preston. I had grave reasons for suspecting that the Free and Accepted Masons were not much more 'ancient' than the establishment of Grand Lodge Masonry in London in 1717."

However, Kirkconnell subsequently changed his mind about what he had formerly considered pseudohistory and, "passed from my early skepticism into a growing sense of the profound age of the Craft... There are elements in Masonry that are nearly as much older than Solomon as Solomon is older than Winston Churchill."

In 1922, Kirkconnell accepted the offer of a faculty position in the English Department at Wesley College. Kirkconnell taught English there for the eleven years, before switching to the Department of Classics for the next seven years. The experience for him proved life changing.

Like many other English-speaking Canadians of his class and generation, Kirkconnell had been brought up to believe in the racial superiority of White Anglo-Saxon Protestants. After he grew to adulthood, he accordingly opposed allowing any further non-British immigration into Canada. He also became passionately interested in the now discredited pseudosciences of scientific racism, Social Darwinism, and Eugenics. Kirkconnell read widely in all three subjects, and composed his own Nordicist tract predicting the imminent demise of the "Nordic race" in Ontario due to the increasing immigration of French-Canadians, Jews, and Slavic peoples. Although his racist writings remain largely unpublished, his eugenicist views were expounded in The International Aspects of Unemployment (1923), which called for the internment in labour camps and wholesale sterilization of disabled Canadians and all others deemed "unfit."

Kirkconnell's experiences, however, as a professor in the multiethnic and multilingual Manitoba city of Winnipeg exposed him to world literature, which caused him to begin questioning his views and making radical teaching innovations. For example, Kirkconnell believed that, not only the Icelandic sagas and the Elder Edda, but also the Old Irish Táin Bó Cúailnge and the Old Low German Heliand, "threw light on Beowulf, the Battle of Maldon, and the Caedmonian Genesis", and advocated teaching all of those texts together.

While seeking background literature for teaching a course on Geoffrey Chaucer, Kirkconnell discovered and fell in love with the Middle Welsh poetry in strict metre by Dafydd ap Gwilym, whom he called, "a great contemporary of Chaucer, with a feeling for nature that was beyond the reach of the London vintner's son." Kirkconnell felt similarly when he discovered the Medieval Latin poetry of the Wandering Scholars and the Medieval Hebrew poetry of Solomon ibn Gabirol and Yehuda Halevi.

As a result, Kirkconnell grew to believe that Prehistoric intermarriage among the ancestors of European peoples had not been detrimental, but positive. Therefore, Kirkconnell concluded, as all Europeans are of genetically mixed ancestry, further White ethnic immigration and intermarriage would actually strengthen the development of Canada as a nation.

It was finally the 1925 death of his wife while giving birth to twin sons that brought Kirkconnell to a more tolerant position. As both a tribute and a memorial to his late wife, Kirkconnell decided to select and translate poetry from forty different languages. He worked in close collaboration with distinguished literary scholars, such as Albert Verwey, Douglas Hyde, and Pavle Popović. He eventually published the volume European Elegies in 1928. In the process, Kirkconnell came to believe that treating the languages, cultures, and literatures of White ethnic immigrants to Canada with respect would instill in them a sense of loyalty and gratitude to their adopted country. In later years, he often used the metaphor of a tapestry to express his vision for the nation's future. For the rest of his life, Kirkconnell continued to fret about the decline of the White Anglo-Saxon Protestant majority in Canada and always believed in lesser forms of scientific racism and the racial inferiority of non-Whites.

Kirkconnell continued publicizing and making translations of the national poetry of European immigrants for the rest of his life. For example, his collection A Golden Treasury of Polish Lyrics was published by The Polish Press, Ltd, in Winnipeg in 1936. Kirkconnell dedicated the book, which included his translations in chronological order from Jan Kochanowski to Maria Pawlikowska-Jasnorzewska, to the memory of Marshal Józef Piłsudski, about whom Kirkconnell also composed a funeral ode. The title page describes Kirkconnell as having been made a knight of the Order of Polonia Restituta by the government of the Second Polish Republic.

Beginning with the poetry composed by Manitoba Icelandic-Canadians such as Stephan G. Stephansson and Guttormur J. Guttormsson, Kirkconnell also translated and publicized verse by recent immigrants to Canada and their descendants, whom he sometimes termed, "New Canadians", from Icelandic, Italian, Polish, Ukrainian, and Canadian Gaelic.

By 1916, disinterest in the poetry of John Milton based on distaste for his Puritanism had reached a new low. Due in large part to the efforts of Ezra Pound and T.S. Eliot, the Puritan poet was even declared deposed, with little or no fanfare, in favor of John Donne and Andrew Marvell, as the Anglosphere's greatest composer of Christian poetry. In response, Kirkconnell sought during the interwar period to return John Milton to his pedestal by translating and publishing what had long been believed to have been the poet's many sources of inspiration from World literature in many other languages. His blank verse translations of the neo-Classical but Biblically centered plays of Dutch national poet Joost van den Vondel, which Kirkconnell strongly believed to have been a major influence on Milton's Paradise Lost and Samson Agonistes, date from this period.

In 1936, Watson Kirkconnell was made a Fellow of the Royal Society of Canada.

== World War II ==
During the Second World War, Kirkconnell used his many contacts among Canadians of Eastern European descent to mobilize them in favor of the Allied war effort against Nazi Germany, Fascist Italy, and Imperial Japan. These same contacts, however, had made Kirkconnell well aware of the sufferings of the relatives of his immigrant friends under both Soviet rule and occupation and he accordingly continued to write articles and to give public lectures attacking both human rights abuses under Marxist-Leninism and Stalinism.

In his memoirs, Kirkconnell recalled about the war years, "I even wrote a parody of T.S. Eliot and his learned appendices, in which almost my entire poem was a patchwork, from my own library shelves, of some forty score high-sounding phrases from all literatures and all periods, including Chinese, Japanese, Ancient Egyptian, Hebrew, Hindi, Hungarian, Basque, Polish, Breton, and Arabic, each with its appropriate footnote. E.K. Brown, to whom I showed it, warned me, with a grin, to keep my unholy hands off the Ark." Despite Brown's cautions, the same poem, "Rain on the Waste Land. (With apologies to Mr. T.S. Eliot)", was eventually published anyway.

After the 1944 publication of Seven Pillars of Freedom, a book which, similarly to Eugene Lyons's 1941 volume The Red Decade: The Stalinist Penetration of America, warned about dangers posed by the Pro-Soviet sympathies among many Canadian intellectuals, Kirkconnell was denounced by two Communist Party of Canada representatives in the Canadian House of Commons, as well as savaged by the Canadian communist press. One Canadian Communist publication called Kirkconnell a, "fascist, mad dog, and a traitor."

Kirkconnell's poem "Agony of Israel", which compares the perpetrators of the Holocaust to Haman from the Book of Esther, was written, "out of life-long sympathy for the Jewish people and keen distress over our Government's attitude towards the refugee situation", and first appeared in the Canadian Jewish Review on 11 June 1943.

The Soviet newspaper Trud also attacked Kirkconnell for being both an anti-communist and a Ukrainophile, and even dubbed him, "the Führer of Canadian Fascism". Meanwhile, so vocal were Kirkconnell's continuing criticisms of Stalinism and of Soviet war crimes that Canadian Prime Minister Mackenzie King seriously considered acting to protect the Soviet-Canadian military alliance against Nazi Germany by silencing Kirkconnell with an Order-in-Council.

== Cold War ==
After the September 1945 defection and revelations of GRU Lt. Igor Gouzenko launched both the Cold War in Canada and the PROFUNC counterintelligence operation, Kirkconnell was recruited as a secret informant for the Royal Canadian Mounted Police Security Service regarding politicians, fellow university professors, and students who were suspected of links to Soviet Bloc foreign intelligence services or the Communist Party of Canada. According to Gordon L. Heath, however, Kirkconnell's motivations were based, "on lofty ideas of democracy" and he accordingly never advocated, "a policy of suppression", but preferred instead to see the real loyalties of Soviet spies, crypto-communists, and fellow travellers laid bare before the Canadian people.

Also at the beginning of the Cold War, Kirkconnell went on the record as an extremely harsh critic of the Western Allies' policy of forced repatriations of anti-communist refugees to the USSR during Operation Keelhaul, of Winston Churchill and Franklin Delano Roosevelt for handing Eastern Europe over to Joseph Stalin at the Yalta Conference, and of the pervasive totalitarianism and human rights abuses in the new Soviet Bloc.

Under the influence of both the Child ballads and the ballads Lepanto and The Ballad of the White Horse by G.K. Chesterton, Kirkconnell also wrote a poem defending Draža Mihailović, harshly denouncing the Serbian Chetnik General's show trial by Josip Broz Tito's Soviet-backed Yugoslav Partisans, and eulogizing the General's execution by firing squad on July 17, 1946. Kirkconnell wrote the poem, however, because he believed that General Mihailović was innocent of both Chetnik war crimes in World War II and of collaboration with the occupying Axis forces, that Mihailović had fought both honorably and selflessly to save his country from Nazism and Titoism, and that his "trial" was nothing more or less than a Stalinist witch hunt. Kirkconnell ended the poem by predicting that one day all peoples under Communist rule, including the Russian people, would be set free, that on that day Mihailović would be revered, "while Tito rots in Hell."

Despite his vocal anti-communism, Kirkconnell was also extremely critical of McCarthyism and once wrote, "I have an uneasy feeling that Senator McCarthy messed up an important job by handling it in an offensive and blundering fashion. It is tragic that the very exposure of the Communist infiltration in the United States fell into his hands."

== Later life ==
From 1948 to 1964, Kirkconnell served as the ninth President of Acadia University in Wolfville, Nova Scotia. He had originally expected to be, "a full time administrative officer", but instead found himself repeatedly drawn back into the classroom. In his 1967 memoirs, Kirkconnell credited his academic colleague Dr. R. MacGregor Fraser with introducing him, after his 1948 move to the Province, to Nova Scotia's many immortal contributions to Scottish Gaelic literature. Kirkconnell and MacGregor Fraser also collaborated upon a literary translation of the iconic poem A' Choille Ghruamach by Tiree-born Nova Scotia Gaelic poet Iain mac Ailein, which was published in the 1948-'49 theme issue of Dalhousie Review under the title, "John MacLean's Gloomy Forest".

Following the 1950 rediscovery of a fraternal jewel dating back to 1785 and from St. George's Masonic Lodge No. 20 in Wolfville, Kirkconnell wrote a poem celebrating the return to the Lodge of what is still called "The Relic." In his 1967 memoirs, Kirkconnell had very high praise for Regular Freemasonry, but singled out Continental Freemasonry for very harsh criticism. Kirkconnell accused Continental Freemasonry of being "atheistic" and of having, "a zeal for political revolution in a spirit both anti-Christian and conspiratorial". Kirkconnell accordingly expressed relief that Freemasonry in the Anglosphere, "which today comprises over ninety per cent of the fraternity", refuses to recognize Continental Freemasonry, and considers it irregular.

During the early 1960s, the fruits of Kirkconnell's decades long collaboration with C.H. Andrusyshen were finally published in two volumes by the University of Toronto.

In the 1963 volume The Ukrainian Poets: 1189-1962, Kirkconnell had translated Dr. Andrusyshen's selection from the whole literary canon of Ukrainian poetry, from the 12th-century Old East Slavic national epic, The Tale of Igor's Campaign, through the literary revival of the 19th century, the Executed Renaissance of the 1920s, and the many Ukrainian language poets, like The New York Group of Poets, who had escaped censorship in the Soviet Union by joining the Ukrainian diaspora throughout the Free World.

In 1964, Drs. Kirkconnell and Andrusyshen's joint literary translations of the selected verse of Ukrainian national poet Taras Shevchenko were also published by the University of Toronto.

In his memoirs, Kirkconnell recalled, "In 1963, public occasions evoked from me two blank verse plays, The Primordial Church of Horton and Let My People Go, a tragedy in strict Greek form with its mise en scène before the palace of Pharaoh on the night before the Exodus. The action may take place in the fifteenth century B.C., but the conflict of humanities is equally applicable to the world of our time. Pharaoh echoes Khrushchov in his indictment of the avante garde, while Moses is a spiritual brother of Madariaga in his insistence on liberty." In his stage directions for the play, however, Kirkconnell took equal aim at Fascism, by instructing that Pharaoh's soldiers were to greet their sovereign with arms raised in a Roman salute.

When Let My People Go was published in his 1965 poetry collection Centennial Tales and Selected Poems, Kirkconnell summarized it as follows, "The guards of Pharaoh seek to arrest Moses on the night of the Passover but cannot find him. In his place they bring to Pharaoh Moses' sister Miriam and certain other Hebrew women. As Pharaoh threatens them with torture, Moses appears and orders him to stop. Pharaoh indulgently permits Moses to engage in a lengthy argument on the importance of freedom - for body, mind, and for soul. The death of Pharaoh's first-born son turns the scales and the Hebrews are permitted to depart."

As Kirkconnell aged, his White Supremacist beliefs became increasingly overt. During the 1960s, he accordingly accused believers in racial equality of having views with no basis in modern science. This is why Kirkconnell's vision for multiculturalism in Canada was never able to widen enough to include the cultures, languages, or literatures of Indigenous Canadians or those of other non-Whites.

Due in large part to his involvement with prominent conspiracy theorist and former Canadian Intelligence Service operative William Guy Carr, Watson Kirkconnell also became, as he aged, a vocal conspiracy theorist. In 1959, he accused water fluoridation of being a Communist mind control plot and also became a vocal adherent of both anti-Semitism and Holocaust revisionism.

Similarly to American Formalist poets Anthony Hecht and Richard Wilbur, Kirkconnell, due to his preference for both writing and rendering his translations into both grammatically correct English and formal verse, had significant conflicts as he grew older against Silent Generation and Baby Boomer free verse poets, who preferred to emulate the work of Ezra Pound.

In 1968, Kirkconnell was made an Officer of the Order of Canada "for his services at home and abroad as an educator, scholar and writer".

== Death and legacy ==
He died at Wolfville, Nova Scotia in 1977. Hungarian Helicon, his last collection of verse translations of Hungarian literature was published posthumously in 1986. Despite Kirkconnell's espousal of both anti-Semitism and Holocaust denial in his later life, the posthumously published The Hungarian Helicon included his translations of four poems by Jewish poet Miklós Radnóti. Intriguingly, three of the Radnóti poems that Kirkconnell translated were written down in a notebook that the poet carried while on a death march at the end of World War II, and were published only after Radnóti became, at the hands of the Royal Hungarian Army, perhaps the most widely lamented victim of the Holocaust in Hungary.

His private papers are preserved at the Acadia University Archives, through which Gordon L. Heath was able to document Kirkconnell's secret role as an RCMP Security Service informant during the early Cold War, in Wolfville, Nova Scotia.

== Bibliography ==
=== Books ===
- 1921 Kapuskasing. An Historical Sketch, Kingston, Ontario.
- 1921 Victoria County Centennial History, Lindsay, Ontario. Revised and updated with the help of Frankie L. MacArthur in 1967.
- 1928 European Elegies: One Hundred Poems Chosen and Translated from European Literature in Fifty Languages, Ottawa.
- 1930 The Tide of Life and Other Poems, Ottawa.
- 1930 North American Book of Icelandic Verse, New York City
- 1930 The European Heritage: A Synopsis of European cultural achievement, London and New York
- 1933 The Magyar Muse: An Anthology of Hungarian Poetry, 1400-1932, Foreword by Mr. Francis Herczeg, Winnipeg.
- 1935 A Canadian Headmaster: A Brief Biography of Thomas Allison Kirkconnell, 1862-1934, Toronto.
- 1935 Canadian Overtones: An Anthology of Canadian Poetry Written Originally in Icelandic, Swedish, Norwegian, Hungarian, Italian, Greek, and Ukrainian, and Now Translated with Biographical, Historical, and Bibliographical Notes, Winnipeg.
- 1936 A Golden Treasury of Polish Lyrics, selected and rendered into English, with a foreword by Roman Dyboski, Winnipeg.
- 1936 The Death of King Buda: An Epic Poem by János Arany, Rendered into English by Watson Kirkconnell in collaboration with Lulu Putnik Payerle, Cleveland, Ohio.
- 1939 Canada, Europe, and Hitler, Toronto.
- 1939 Titus the Toad, Toronto.
- 1940 European Elements in Canadian Life, Toronto.
- 1940 The Flying Bull and Other Tales (original poetry), Toronto. New editions published in 1949, 1956, & 1964.
- 1940 The Ukrainian Canadians and the War, Toronto. A translation into the Ukrainian language by Honoré Ewach was also published.
- 1940 A Western Idyll, Hamilton, Ontario.
- 1941 Canadians All: A Primer of National Unity, Ottawa.
- 1941 Twilight of Liberty, Toronto.
- 1943 The Crow and the Nighthawk, Hamilton.
- 1943 Our Communists and the New Canadians, Toronto.
- 1943 Our Ukrainian Loyalists, Winnipeg.
- 1944 Canada and Immigration Toronto
- 1944 Seven Pillars of Freedom, Toronto. Second edition published in 1952.
- 1946 The Quebec Tradition: An Anthology of French-Canadian Prose and Verse, In collaboration with Séraphin Marion, Montreal.
- 1947 Prince Igor's Raid Against the Polovtsi, Saskatoon, Saskatchewan.
- 1948 Liberal Education in Canadian Democracy, Hamilton, Ontario.
- 1951 Stalin's Red Empire, Winnipeg.
- 1952 The Celestial Cycle: The Theme of Paradise Lost in World Literature with Translations of the Major Analogues University of Toronto.
- 1955 The Mòd at Grand Pré: A Nova Scotian Light Opera in Two Acts, Libretto by Watson Kirkconnell, music by E.A. Collins. Wolfville, Nova Scotia.
- 1962 Adam Mickewicz: Pan Tadeusz, or the Last Foray in Lithuania, Translated by Watson Kirkconnell, Toronto and New York. Second edition 1968.
- 1963 The Ukrainian Poets: 1189-1962, University of Toronto
- 1964 That Invincible Samson: The Theme of Samson Agonistes in World Literature with Translations of the Major Analogues, University of Toronto.
- 1964 László Mécs: The Slaves Sing: Selected Poems, Translated by Watson Kirkconnell. De Pere.
- The Poetical Works of Taras Shevchenko, The Kobzar. Translated by C.H. Andrusyshen and Watson Kirkconnell, University of Toronto Press
- 1965 Centennial Tales and Selected Poems, Toronto.
- 1967 A Slice of Canada: Memoirs, University of Toronto Press.
- 1968 László Mécs: I Graft Roses Upon Eglantines, Translated by Watson Kirkconnell. Toronto.
- 1970 Scottish Place-Names in Canada, Winnipeg.
- 1973 Awake the Courteous Echo: The Themes and Prosody of Comus, Lycidas, and Paradise Regained in World Literature with Translations of the Major Analogues, Toronto.
- 1974 Rest, Perturbed Spirit: The Life of Cecil Francis Lloyd, 1884-1938, Windsor, Nova Scotia.

== Quotes ==
- "I disagree profoundly with those who would hack off completely all roots of European culture and then hew the mutilated trunk into conformity with some arbitrary nationalistic pattern; I believe rather that the perpetration of the finest elements of Old World culture will incalculably enrich the life of the New World. This is the cornerstone of my venture. North Americans of Welsh or Scottish extraction are not worse but better citizens when they drink from the springs of their ancestral literatures. Shall we not likewise seek to cherish the magnificent literatures which are the heritage of nearly every European stock?"
- "I do not fancy spending the rest of my life pottering over defunct Indian tongues especially when there is no literature connected with them, and their only value consists in a none too certain aid to ethnological classification."
- "[I]n a wholesale condemnation of that [Nazi] regime and all its works, I am not prepared to join. It has done wonders in rehabilitating German industry, in giving new spirit to the youth of the country and in redressing many historic wrongs against the nation.”
- "[I am] convinced in a general way that the propaganda figure of six million liquidations in the Nazi concentration-camps is 95 per cent legend."
- "Certain basic facts emerge, however, from any candid study of Freemasonry. It is deeply religious and all of its sessions are opened and closed with prayer, but it is not Christian. The Holy Bible has its invariable place on the altar of Masonry in the English-speaking world, but its basic texts are all from the Old Testament and not from the New. The Jew can accept its teachings as readily as the Christian. The Incarnation and Atonement are unknown to it. Nothing in Masonry is repugnant to Christianity but to the Christian it cannot take the place of his own religious faith nor does it aspire to do so. In my forty-seven years of Freemasonry, I have never heard any hostility towards Roman Catholic or Jew expressed in any Masonic Lodge. On the other hand, I have never met a Catholic Mason, although Catholics are not excluded by statute and Cardinal Cushing has recently been fraternizing with the Masons of Connecticut."

Academic offices
Preceded by Frederic William Patterson	President of Acadia University; 1948-July 1964	Succeeded by James MacDonald Richardson Beveridge
