= The Bards of Wales =

1857 Hungarian ballad by János Arany

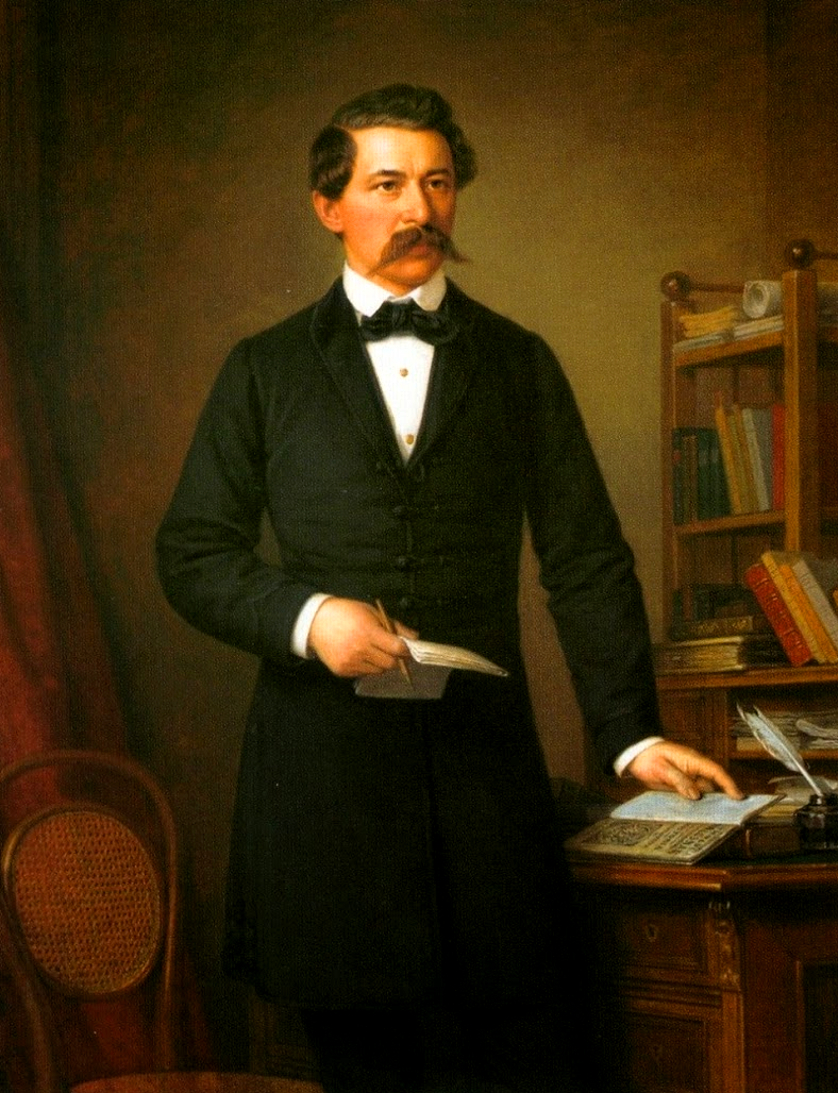
János Arany

The Bards of Wales (Hungarian: A walesi bárdok) is a ballad by the Hungarian poet János Arany, written in 1857. Alongside the Toldi trilogy, it is one of his best known works.

== Poem ==
In 1857, Arany and other Hungarian poets were asked to write praise poetry for the visit of Emperor Franz Joseph. Instead, Arany wrote a ballad which he alleged was rooted in Welsh folklore and in the early history of Welsh nationalism.

Arany explained in his preface to the poem, "Historians doubt it, but it strongly stands in legend that Edward I of England sent 500 Welsh bards to the stake after his victory over the Welsh" (in 1277), "to prevent them from rousing the country and destroying English rule by telling of the glorious past of their nation."

Arany's analogy criticised the tight control wielded over the Kingdom of Hungary by Baron Alexander von Bach after the defeat of the Hungarian Revolution of 1848 by a military alliance between the Imperial Austrian Army and the Imperial Russian Army. The ballad was also a covert form of nonviolent resistance to Government censorship and to the many other repressive and widely unpopular policies imposed by the Baron upon the Hungarian people. It was also a harsh denunciation of both the domestic policies of the Monarch and of his planned visit to Budapest. This was because Emperor Franz Joseph had ascended to the throne during the 1848 revolutions throughout his Empire and had given the military carte blanche to defeat what he saw as both rebels against his crown and as a serious threat to the future survival of both the dynasty and the Roman Catholic Church.

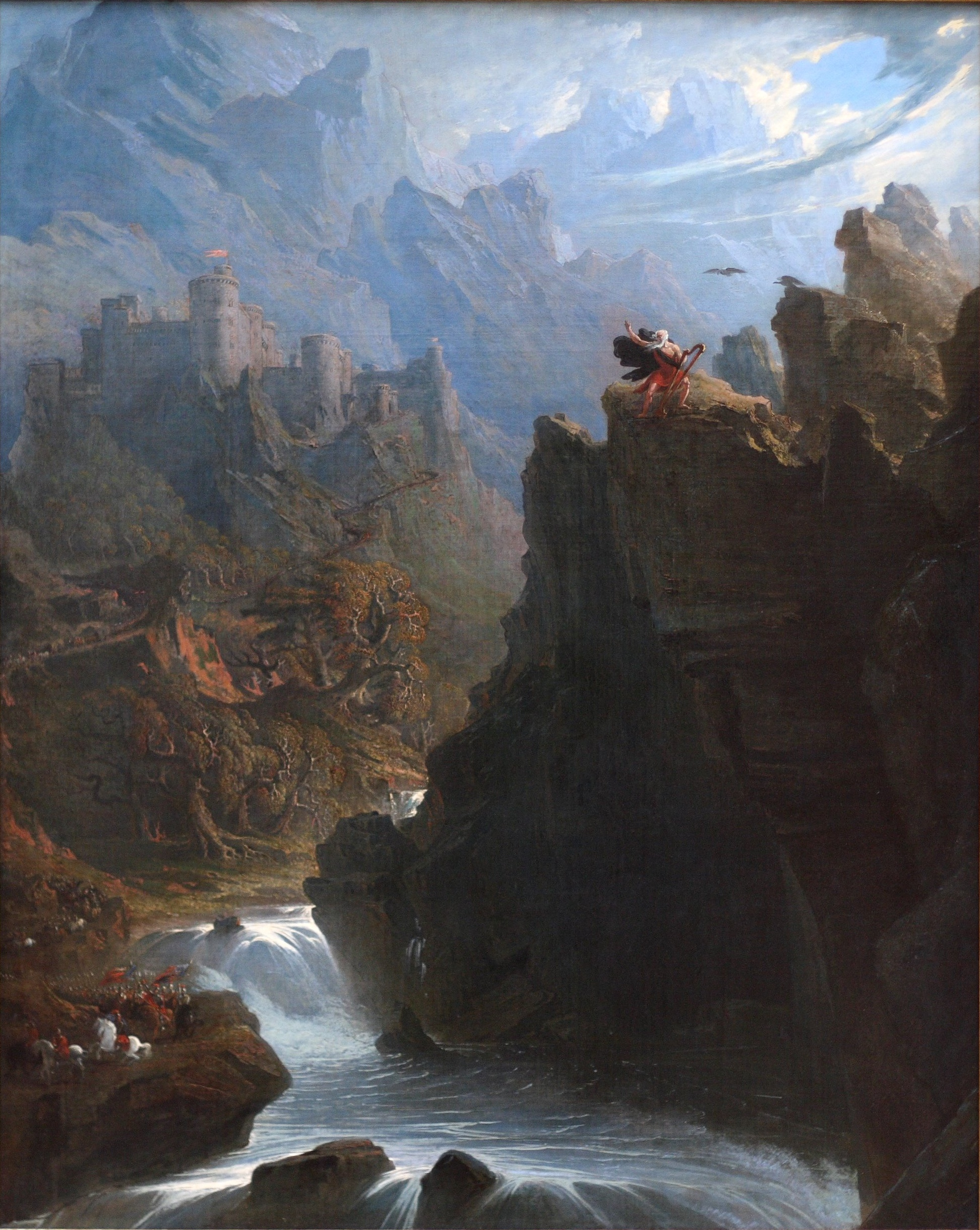
The Bard, by John Martin (1789-1854), and inspired by Thomas Gray's poem of the same name.

Arany's poem was accordingly written "for the desk drawer" and published only six years later in 1863, disguised as a literary translation of a ballad from Middle English literature, as a means of evading the censorship that ended only with the Austro-Hungarian Compromise of 1867.

Cross of Neith flag, believed to have been the battle flag of Prince Llywelyn ap Gruffudd.

In Wales, with only a few exceptions under the House of Tudor, the tradition of royal patronage of both the Eisteddfod literary festivals and of the composers of Welsh bardic poetry ended with the attainder of the House of Aberffraw; after Prince Llywelyn ap Gruffudd was killed in action at Cilmeri on 11 December 1282, while leading an uprising against the loss of Welsh independence to King Edward Longshanks. For this reason, a very similar denunciation of King Edward to his face had already been followed by the suicide of the last Welsh poet at the end of Thomas Gray's 1757 poem The Bard (set c. 1283), and which, along with the legend, may also have inspired Arany. Gray's poem is also similar in being intended as an encoded criticism of Whig political ideology and the allegedly repressive policies enabled by the British royal family during a much later period.

In reality, subsequent Welsh history as well as that of the Welsh bardic profession is far more nuanced. Even after the end of Welsh independence, the patronage of the bards by Roman Catholic priests, bishops, and religious orders continued until the Reformation. Afterwards, the Welsh nobility continued their own established custom of similar patronage; but this tradition also ended as the Welsh aristocracy became slowly but completely Anglicized during the 17th- and 18th-centuries. An extremely stubborn determination to preserve Welsh literature and culture led in response to the late 18th-century revival of the Eisteddfod tradition, but without royal or noble patronage, first by the Gwyneddigion Society and then by Iolo Morganwg and the Gorsedd Cymru. The ensuing literary and language revival still continues and is why Welsh poetry in strict metre is still being written and why the Welsh language itself, almost alone of the Celtic languages, is neither a dead or a critically endangered language.

== Cultural significance ==
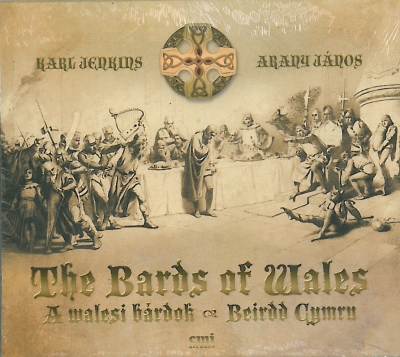
Album cover of The Bards Of Wales by Karl Jenkins (2012)

All Hungarian students in the sixth grade of elementary school learn "The Bards of Wales" by heart, in view of its literary importance and historical message.

The best-known English translation, by the Canadian literary scholar Watson Kirkconnell, renders Arany's ballad into the same idiom as the Border Ballads and was published in his 1933 volume The Magyar Muse. In September 2007 an English manuscript copy of the poem, translated by Péter Zollman, was donated to the National Library of Wales in Aberystwyth.

The poem was set to music by the Hungarian band Kaláka and also by Zsuzsa Koncz on her third poetry album in 1989. Dalriada made a different setting in 2003, which was re-recorded and re-released in 2004 and in 2009, on an album with several other settings of Arany poems. The Welsh composer Karl Jenkins wrote a cantata to the Zollman translation of the poem in 2011.

== See also ==
- "Kurds'komu bratovi", a poem about the Kurds used as a symbol of Ukrainian resistance against the Soviet Union

== Other sources ==
- Alternative translation by Bernard Adams
- Peter Zollman's English translation
- Rory Leishman, a Canadian Bard of Wales
- What The Bards of Wales means to a Hungarian-American
- The manuscript of the poem
- The Bards of Wales, translated by Watson Kirkconnel
