= Péter Zollman =

Hungarian scientist, research physicist, engineer, inventor

Péter Zollman (Budapest, June 14 1931 – Bristol, December 3, 2013) was a Hungarian-born scientist, research physicist, engineer, inventor and translator of literary works.

== Biography ==
=== Technology ===
He attended Berzsenyi Dániel High School (where he met George Soros and George Klein), then to the Budapest University of Technology: first as a general engineer, then as a weak-current electrical engineer at the Faculty of Mechanical and Electrical Engineering (where he worked as a demonstrator at Charles Simonyi's department for two years). He then worked at United Incandescent Lamp and Electricity Company (he met Zoltán Lajos Bay there), where he also produced microwave tubes, klystrons, and travelling-wave tubes for radar equipment; he was appointed head of department there.

At the end of November 1956 he left Hungary and moved to London. Dennis Gabor read a publication of his and, on the basis of it, offered him a research position in his laboratory, where he was working on the development of the flat television picture tube – he was aided in that by an invention of Zollman's, which he expounded in his doctoral thesis. He then joined a mechanical engineering company as a development engineer and even became its manager, but he sought a different challenge: he became the technical manager of a huge British global company active in a wide range of fields, from banknote printing, creating banknote- and cheque-printing machines to semiconductors and household appliances.

He went on to work on remote control of tunnelling and mining machinery, including the large electron-proton collider at CERN near Geneva and the Channel Tunnel, but his equipment was also used in the Soviet Union on hundreds of tunnels for the Baikal–Amur Mainline. Their designs and products were sold in America, Germany, France and Japan. Correcting any possible mistake afterwards would have been extremely difficult and expensive, and could have ruined their company, so they had to strive for perfection. In the course of his work, he was able to negotiate in four languages, by his account, thanks to his upbringing in Hungary, although it was in England where he learned French. More than a hundred of his patents have been known to the world.

=== Translation ===
In 1993, after a sudden epiphany, he gave up the active management of his company and started translating poetry, essentially because he wanted to make Hungarian poetry accessible to his non-Hungarian-speaking daughters. He felt that there were very few translations that made Hungarian poetry accessible to English speakers, so as a trial he first translated Mihály Babits' poem The Danaïds, which he admitted he did with relative ease and good results. In the years that followed, he translated hundreds of more serious poems, mainly those in which formal accuracy was important. He found that form was important in Hungarian poetry, more so than in English poetry, for instance. As he wrote: "translating Hungarian poetry is such a pleasure that it gilds my life."

George Klein, in a study of Attila József in Pietà (ISBN 9780262111614), quoted the opening lines of the poem My Homeland as untranslatable into any other language. Zollman translated them in more than forty forms, hoping that one of them will turn out really beautiful.

Ádám Makkai commented on Zollman's translation of Attila József's poem For My Birthday: "All but one translator have failed at the passage Én egész népemet fogom / nem középiskolás fokon / taní-tani! His name is Peter Zollman; this is how he solved it: I’ll teach my nation one and all / much greater things than what you call / college knowledge."

It was thanks to him that the Anglophone world became acquainted with the poems of Dániel Berzsenyi, Attila József, Dezső Kosztolányi, Ágnes Nemes Nagy, Ottó Orbán, Sándor Kányádi, and István Baka, among others. In addition, he translated Csongor and Tünde by Mihály Vörösmarty, Laodameia by Mihály Babits and Duke Bluebeard's Castle by Béla Balázs.

One of his most significant works is his translation of János Arany's poem The Bards of Wales, which formed the basis for the eponymous composition of Welsh composer Karl Jenkins' cantata, performed to great acclaim in the UK and Budapest.

== Awards and honours ==
- Queen's Award, England – three times (one for their tunnelling equipment and two for outstanding export performance)
- Milán Füst Prize (1999, Hungarian Academy of Sciences)
- Pro Cultura Hungarica Award (2002)
- Nominated "Best Book of the Year" by Seamus Heaney (for translations of Attila József, TLS, 2005)
- The Times' Stephen Spender Prize (for the translation of István Baka's poem Aeneas and Dido, 2007)
- Shortlisted twice in the top 6 for the Oxford-Weidenfeld Translation Prize (first for the translation of Sándor Kányádi's There is a Land, and second for István Baka's Selected Poems, in 2001 and 2004)
- Knight's Cross of the Order of Merit of the Republic of Hungary (2013)

== Volumes with his translations ==
=== Bilingual volumes of poetry published by Maecenas Kiadó ===
- 36 vers = 36 poems by Dezső Kosztolányi. Budapest, Maecenas, 2000. ISBN 9632030281
- 43 vers = 43 poems by Attila József. Az utószót írta: George Szirtes. Budapest, Maecenas. ISBN 9632031202; Newry, Northern Ireland, Abbey Press, 2005. Appointed as Best Book of the Year by Seamus Heaney, 2005.
- 51 vers = 51 poems by Ágnes Nemes Nagy. Budapest, Maecenas, 2007. ISBN 9789632031637
- 37 vers = 37 poems by György Faludy. Peter Zollman. Budapest, Maecenas, 2010. ISBN 9789632032252 Részlet

=== Other bi- or multilingual volumes ===
- Csongor és Tünde : Verses tündérszínjáték = The Quest Csongor and Tünde : A fairytale play in verse by Mihály Vörösmarty. Budapest, Merlin Nemzetközi Színház, 1996. ISBN 9630470241
- Nine ballads : of guilt and remorse; The Nightingale : a village satire = Kilenc ballada és a fülemile by János Arany. Budapest, Atlantis / Merlin, 1997. ISBN 9630570246
- Duke Bluebeard's Castle = A kékszakállú herceg vára by Béla Balázs. Opera libretto and verse-drama by Béla Balázs; János Kass; Peter Zollman; György Kroó. Budapest, 1998. ISBN 9630347792
- Láodamía : 20th century verse-drama from the Homeric cycle = Laodameia by Mihály Babits. Budapest, [Merlin Nemzetközi Színház], 1999. ISBN 9630347792
- Sodrásban = In mid-stream : talks and speeches by Árpád Göncz. Budapest, Corvina Books, 1999. ISBN 963-13-4801-6

=== In English and other languages ===
- Last poems from a Nazi lager in Serbia by Miklós Radnóti [Written in a Nazi labour camp before he was murdered fifty years ago. 1944–1994], [Surrey], Babel, 1994. ISBN 0952478005
- Babel : poems and translations. 1994
- Babel : poetry translations mainly from Hungarian, 1993–1996. (Hungarian and English). Walton-on-Thames, 1997 (reprint) ISBN 0952478013
- Poetry Translations Mainly from Hungarian. Edited and translated by Peter Zollman. London: Babel, 1997. ISBN 0952478021
- Sándor Kányádi: There Is a Land. Selected Poems. Budapest, Corvina, 2000. ISBN 9631349047
- Legenda, változatlan : válogatott és új versek ("Legend, unchanged: selected and new poems"): poems by Éva Petrőczi. Budapest : Fekete Sas, 2001. ISBN 963825498X
- Ottó Orbán: The Witching Time of Night. Chicago, Atlantis-Centaur, 2003. ISBN 1930902026
- István Baka: Selected Poems (with contributions from Mitchael Longley, George Szirtes, Bill Tinley, John W. Wilkinson) [Nominated for the Oxford-Weidenfeld Translation Prize]. Newry, Northern Ireland, Abbey Press, 2003. ISBN 1-901617-22-X
- Éva Tóth: Emlékvers 17 nyelven = Memorial Poem in 17 languages Pomáz, Kráter Műhely Egyesület, 2006. ISBN 9637329854
- András Gerevich: Tiresias's Confesson. Translated by Thomas Cooper, David Hill, George Szirtes, Christopher Whyte, and Peter Zollman. Corvina, 2008. ISBN 978-963-13-5790-5
- Profán paletta : Karafiáth Orsolya versei. "Profane palette: Poems by Orsolya Karafiáth". Budapest : Panderma, 2009
- The Bards of Wales, 2011

=== In English-language anthologies ===
- Attila Jozsef's Poems and Fragments. Budapest / Maynooth : Argumentum / Cardinal Press, 1999. ISBN 9634461131
- The Right to Sanity : a Victor Határ reader. Budapest : Corvina, 1999. ISBN 9631348199
- In Quest of the Miracle Stag: The Poetry of Hungary, Vol. 1.: an Anthology of Hungarian Poetry in English Translation from the 13th Century to the Present, 1. kötet, Chicago, Atlantis Centaur, 1996.
- In Quest of the Miracle Stag: The Poetry of Hungary, Vol. 1 – Second, Revised Edition. (Edited by Ádám Makkai) Chicago, University of Illinois Press : Budapest, Tertia, 2000. ISBN 9638602422
- In Quest of the Miracle Stag: The Poetry of Hungary, Vol. 2, An Anthology of Hungarian Poetry from the Start of the 20th Century to the Present in English Translation. (Edited by Ádám Makkai) Chicago, 2003. ISBN 9632108140
- The Audit is Done : A Taste of 20th Century Hungarian Poetry = Kész a leltár : Egy évszázad félszáz magyar verse angolul (in Hungarian and in English) by Peter Zollman; János Kass. Budapest, Új Világ Kiadó, Antonin Liehm Alapítvány, 2003. Online version (European Cultural Review, 14., ISSN 1219-7149)
- An Island of Sound: Hungarian Poetry and Fiction before and beyond the Iron Curtain. Ed.: G. Szirtes és M. Vajda. London : Harvill, 2004. ISBN 1843431866
- Hide and Seek. Contemporary Hungarian Literature. Ed.: Györgyi Horváth and Anna Benedek. Budapest, József Attila Kör, 2004. ISBN 9632171802
- The Lost Rider – A Bilingual Anthology: The Corvina Book of Hungarian Verse. Selected and edited by Péter Dávidházi, Győző Ferencz, László Kúnos, Szabolcs Várady, and George Szirtes. Budapest: Corvina, 1997. ISBN 9631343820 Later edition: The Lost Rider – A Bilingual Anthology (ed.: Miklós Kozma). Corvina Kiadó Kft., 2007. ISBN 9789631356205
- The Times Stephen Spender Prize, 2007 Archived with the date December 22, 2015, at Wayback Machine. Zollman Péter's award-winning translation in the booklet: István Baka: Aeneas and Dido
- A Tribute to Attila József On the 70th anniversary of his death. Ed.: Tamás Kabdebó. Newry (Northern Ireland), Abbey Press, 2007. ISBN 9781901617252
- New Order – Hungarian Poets of the Post-1989 Generation. Ed.: George Szirtes. ARC Publications, 2010. ISBN 9781906570507
- I lived on this Earth: An anthology of poems on the Holocaust. Alba Press, 2012. ISBN 9780952760511
- Inspired by Hungarian poetry: British poets in conversation with Attila József Archived with the date February 25, 2017, at Wayback Machine. ISBN 9786155389290. Péter Zollman's translations: József Attila: For my Birthday, By The Danube, You Came with a Stick.
