= József Gémes =

Hungarian screenwriter (1939–2013)

- Born: 9 November 1939; Budapest, Hungary
- Died: 13 April 2013 (aged 73)
- Occupation(s): Animator, film director

József Gémes (9 November 1939 – 13 April 2013) was a Hungarian animator and film director best known for directing animated films.

== Selected filmography as director ==
Year	Title	Notes
1975	Hugo the Hippo	
1984	Heroic Times	
1989	Willy the Sparrow	
1991	The Princess and the Goblin	
1997	Tiny Heroes	
