= Heroic Times =

1984 Hungarian animated historical epic film

- Directed by: József Gémes
- Screenplay by: József Gémes
- Based on: Toldi trilogy by János Arany
- Starring: Gyula Szabó
- Cinematography: György Varga
- Music by: Tibor Erkel; János Decsényi
- Production company: Pannonia Film Studio
- Release date: 30 August 1984
- Running time: 79 minutes
- Country: Hungary
- Language: Hungarian

Heroic Times (Hungarian: Daliás idők) is a 1984 Hungarian animated historical epic film directed by József Gémes.

== Summary ==
It is an adaptation of the Toldi trilogy, a 19th-century epic poem in three parts by János Arany about a 14th century young man's attempts to become a knight.

== Production ==
The film was produced through Pannonia Film Studio and is notable for its visual style, which resembles oil painting.

== Accolades ==
It won the feature film award at the 1985 Annecy International Animated Film Festival.

== Home media ==
Deaf Crocodile released the newly-restored film on Blu-ray August 29, 2023.

== See also ==
- Miklós Toldi
- Arthouse animation
