= Napisten Hava =

Napisten hava

Studio album by Dalriada
- Released: 29 September 2012
- Genre: Folk metal
- Language: Hungarian
- Label: Nail, Hammer Music Hungary

Dalriada chronology
Ígéret (2011)	Napisten hava (2012)	Áldás (2015)

Napisten Hava is the seventh studio album of the Hungarian folk metal band Dalriada. A videoclip for "A Dudás" was released 17 September 2012.

The album peaked at position 3 in the Top 40 albums chart of Hungary.

== Track listing ==
No.	Title	Translation	Length
1.	"Intro (Felcsíki lassú csárdás)"		1:10
2.	"A Dudás"	The Bagpiper	5:34
3.	"Tündérkert"	Fairy Garden	5:41
4.	"Napom, Fényes Napom"	My Sun, My Bright Sun	5:04
5.	"Napisten Hava"	Month of the Sun-God	6:44
6.	"Julianus Útja"	The Journey of Julianus	5:39
7.	"Puszta Föld"	Barren Earth	5:45
8.	"Hunyadi és Kapisztrán Nándorfehérvári Diadaláról (Saltarello)"	About the Triumph of Hunyadi and Kapisztrán at Nándorfehérvár*	5:32
9.	"Hírhozó"	Bringer of News	6:37
10.	"Borivók Éneke"	Singing of the Wine Drinkers	4:33
11.	"A Juhászlegény Balladája"	Ballad of the Shepherd Boy	5:55
12.	"Outro (Gyimesi)"		1:09

- *Nándorfehérvár is the old Hungarian name of the capital city of Serbia, Belgrade.

== Personnel ==
Dalriada

- Laura Binder – vocals
- András Ficzek – vocals, guitars
- Mátyás Németh-Szabó – guitar
- István Molnár – bass
- Barnabás Ungár – keyboards, backing vocals
- Tadeusz Rieckmann – drums, harsh vocals, backing vocals

Additional and session musicians

- Attila Fajkusz – violin, tambourine, backing vocals
- Ernő Szőke – doublebass
- Gergely Szőke – viola, lute, acoustic guitars
- Ádám Csete – bagpipe
