= Áldás =

Studio album by Dalriada
- Released: 7 September 2015
- Genre: Folk metal
- Language: Hungarian
- Label: Nail, Hammer Music Hungary

Dalriada chronology
Napisten Hava (2012)	Áldás (2015)	Nyárutó (2018)

Áldás is the eighth studio album of the Hungarian folk metal band Dalriada. It was released in September 2015 on Hammer Music. Áldás peaked at number 2 in the Hungarian Albums Chart.

== Track listing ==
No.	Title	Translation	Length
1.	"Intro"		1:44
2.	"Amit ad az ég (Álmos búcsúja)"	What the Heaven Gives (The Farewell of Álmos)	4:42
3.	"Dózsa rongyosa"	The Paltry of Dózsa*	6:09
4.	"Úri toborzó"	The Mighty Recruitment Of The Immortal Lords Of Steel*	7:11
5.	"Áldás"	Blessing	4:53
6.	"Világfa"	World Tree	4:44
7.	"Zivatar"	Storm	4:46
8.	"Moldvageddon"	Moldvageddon	3:34
9.	"Hamu és gyász"	Ash and Mourning	5:52
10.	"Futóbetyár"	Running Outlaw	5:51
11.	"Fele zivatar"	Half Storm	4:21

- *Both "Dózsa rongyosa" and "Úri toborzó" tell about the rebellion led by György Dózsa and the end of Úri Toborzó refers to the Battle of Mohács.

== Personnel ==
Dalriada

- Laura Binder – vocals
- András Ficzek – vocals, guitars
- Mátyás Németh-Szabó – guitar
- István Molnár – bass
- Gergely Szabó – keyboards, backing vocals
- Ádám Csete – flutes, bagpipe
- Tadeusz Rieckmann – drums, harsh vocals, backing vocals

Additional and session musicians

- Attila Fajkusz – violin, tambourine, backing vocals
- Ernő Szőke – doublebass
- Gergely Szőke – viola, lute, acoustic guitars
