= Ígéret =

Studio album by Dalriada
- Released: 12 February 2011
- Genre: Folk metal
- Length: 51:45
- Language: Hungarian
- Label: AFM

Dalriada chronology
| Arany-album (2009) | Ígéret (2011) | Napisten Hava (2012) |

Ígéret is the seventh studio album of the Hungarian folk metal band Dalriada. This is their first album that includes a song not only in Hungarian, since "Leszek A Hold" has Finnish verses, sung by Jonne Järvelä of Korpiklaani. The album title means "promise" in Hungarian.

== Style ==
Ígéret combines metal elements like male and female growling with clean song and Hungarian folk, featuring a power metal ballad, "Mennyei Harang" as well as contrapuntal solos. Strong vocal melodies have been observed throughout the album. Apart from influences of power metal, the album shows hints of thrash metal.

== Reception ==
Professional ratings
Review scores
| Source | Rating |
|---|---|
| Metal Forces | 6.5/10 |
| Metal Hammer (Germany) | 5/7 |
| Onemetal.com | 4.5/5 stars |
| Stormbringer | 5/5 stars |

The album received favourable reviews from various webzines. Onemetal.com and the Austrian Stormbringer webzine lauded the successful combination of metal and folk and the songwriting on Ígéret. The latter remarked the diversity of the various tracks and singer Laura Binder's skill in clean vocals and growls. The German edition of Metal Hammer awarded five out of seven points to the album in a 2011 rating. The Metal Forces magazine was equally positive about Binder's clean vocals and noted that Dalriada did not use as much growling as other bands of the genre.

Ígéret was also a commercial success and peaked at position 6 in the Hungarian Mahasz official charts.

== Track listing ==
| No. | Title | Translation | Length |
|---|---|---|---|
| 1. | "Intro" | | 2:43 |
| 2. | "Hajdútánc" | Hajdú Dance | 4:59 |
| 3. | "Hozd el, Isten" | Bring it, God | 4:33 |
| 4. | "Mennyei Harang" | Heavenly Bell | 6:17 |
| 5. | "Ígéret" | Promise | 4:37 |
| 6. | "Igazi Tűz" | True Fire | 4:42 |
| 7. | "Kinizsi Mulatsága" | Kinizsi’s Revelry | 4:19 |
| 8. | "A Hadak Útja" | Armies' Road | 6:41 |
| 9. | "Leszek a Csillag" | I’ll be the Star | 5:50 |
| 10. | "Leszek a Hold" (featuring Jonne Järvelä) | I’ll be the Moon | 6:14 |
| 11. | "Outro" | | 0:50 |
| Total length: | | | 51:45 |

The song "Igazi Tűz [True Fire]" is a tribute to former band member Péter Hende who died unexpectedly in 2001.

== Personnel ==
- Laura Binder - vocals
- András Ficzek - vocals, guitars
- Mátyás Németh-Szabó - guitar
- István Molnár - bass
- Barnabás Ungár - keyboards, backing vocals
- Tadeusz Rieckmann - drums, harsh vocals, backing vocals

Session/guest musicians:

- Jonne Järvelä - vocals (on track 10)
- Attila Fajkusz - violin, tambourine, backing vocals
- Ernő Szőke - doublebass
- Gergely Szőke - viola, lute, acoustic guitars
