= Kurds'komu bratovi =

Poem by Ukrainian Vasyl Symonenko

"Kurds'komu bratovi" (Ukrainian: Курдському братові, lit. 'To a Kurdish Brother') is an Aesopian poem written by the Ukrainian Vasyl Symonenko in March 1963 and disseminated clandestinely in samizdat until 1965 when it appeared posthumously in the German journal Suchasnist. It has been described as one of Symonenko's greatest works and made Symonenko a national hero and one of the most important figures in Ukrainian literature. The poem appeared during the height of the First Iraqi-Kurdish War in which the Soviet Union was involved.

In 1968, an agricultural college lecturer named Mykola Kots was sentenced to seven years in camp and five years in exile after disseminating copies of the poem in which the word "Kurd" was replaced with "Ukrainian".

== Summary ==
The poem has six stanzas and begins with a description of chauvinists invading the land of the Kurds. In the first four stanzas, Symonenko addresses a Kurdish friend and encourages him to fight the invader and oppressor who aims at eradicating the Kurdish language and the Kurdish people. By the end of the fourth stanza, Symonenko introduces the word "our" and asserts that chauvinism and its deceits are the worst foes of both Kurds and Ukrainians.

== Analysis ==
Svitlana Kobets of the University of Toronto argues that the poem became "a symbol of national resurrection and resistance to Soviet oppression". When the poem was secretly disseminated, it became associated with the aspirations to liberate Ukraine from the Soviet Union and Symonenko's take on the Kurdish liberation movement gave the Ukrainian liberation movement a universal meaning. Symonenko himself asserted that historical parallels were needed because the common denominator was chauvinism, and argued that Ukrainians would end up in the same situation as the Kurds regarding statelessness if they did not fight the Soviet regime.

Nataliya Romanova points out the similarities between the writing in "Kurds'komu bratovi" with the poem "Kavkaz" (Кавказ) by Taras Shevchenko, arguing that by using Shevchenko as a prototext (source text), Symonenko echoed the sentiments of resistance against Russian rule which were prevalent in the works of Shevchenko. The inspiration is seen at the first stanza:

Into the fragrant valleys, scarred and wounded,
Comes the invader, hungry chauvinism.

== See also ==
- "The Bards of Wales", a poem about Welsh bards used as a symbol of Hungarian resistance to the Austrian Empire
