= Vasyl Symonenko =

Ukrainian poet, journalist, and human rights activist

- Василь Симоненко
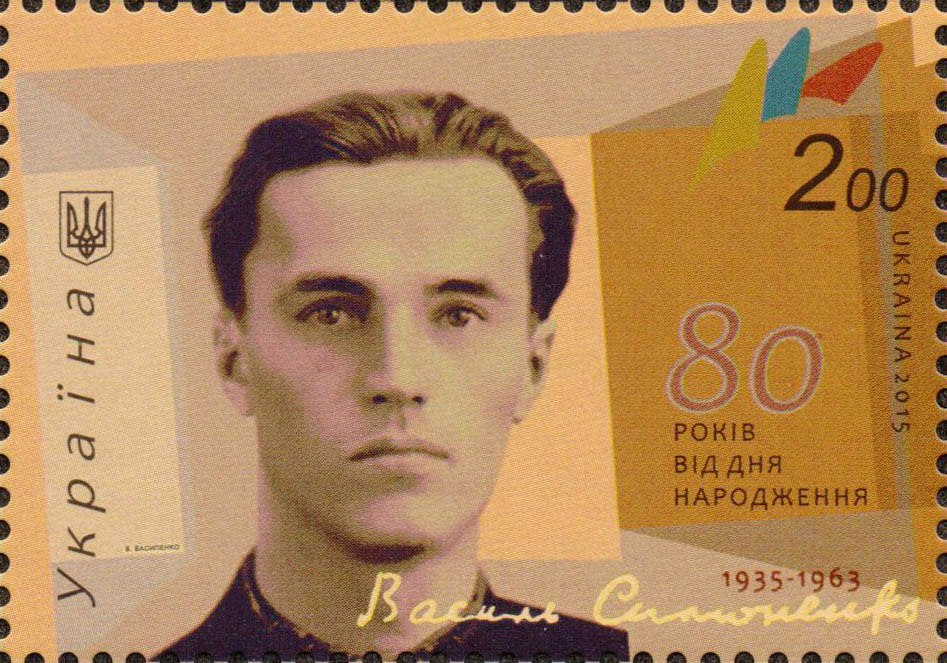
- Symonenko on a 2015 Ukrainian stamp
- Born: 8 January 1935; Biivtsi, Ukrainian SSR, Soviet Union (now Poltava Oblast, Ukraine)
- Died: 13 December 1963 (aged 28); Cherkasy, Ukrainian SSR, Soviet Union (now Ukraine)
- Citizenship: Soviet Union
- Education: Kyiv University (1957)
- Occupations: Poet; public activist
- Writing career
- Notable awards: Shevchenko National Prize
- Movement: Sixtiers

Signature
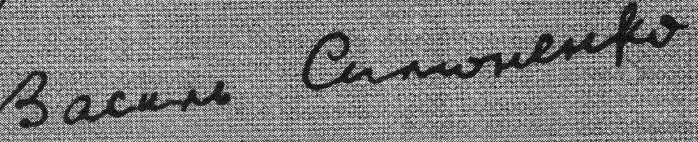

Vasyl Andriiovych Symonenko (Ukrainian: Василь Андрійович Симоненко; 8 January 1935 – 13 December 1963) was a Ukrainian poet, journalist, and activist of the dissident movement. He is considered one of the most important figures in Ukrainian literature of the early 1960s. In the opinion of the Museum of the Dissident Movement in Kyiv, the works and early death of Vasyl Symonenko had an enormous impact on the rise of the national democratic movement in Ukraine.

== Biography ==
He was born into a peasant family in the village of Biivtsi, Kharkiv Oblast (today Poltava Oblast).

After graduating from Kyiv State University in 1957, Vasyl Symonenko worked as a journalist at several newspapers in Cherkasy Oblast.

His debut book of poems "Тиша і грім / Tysha i hrim" ("Silence and thunder") was published in 1962 and made the talent of Symonenko apparent amongst the young poets. His literary environment included the poets Mykola Vinhranovsky, Ivan Drach and Lina Kostenko, the publicists, critics Ivan Dziuba, Ivan Svitlichny, Yevhen Sverstiuk, who, with other Ukrainian intilligensia of the time, made a group which is now known as the шістдестятники (Sixtiers).

During his last year Vasyl Symonenko wrote his second book – "Земне тяжіння / Zemne tyazhinnya" ("Earth’s gravity"), verses from which were quoted, written out (adding what the Soviet censorship had omitted), learned off by heart and compared with the poetry of Taras Shevchenko.

In 1962, Symonenko together with his friends A. Horska and Les Tanyuk, uncovered the burial places of NKVD repressions in Bykivnia, Lukianivskyi and Vasyslkivskyi cemeteries near Kyiv. Because of this, he was cited by the Kyiv City Council. According to some scholars, this could have caused his falling out of favour with the government, and, possibly, his death.

In 1963, Symonenko was beaten badly by employees of the local militsiya at the Smila railway station. Symonenko died in the main regional hospital on December 13, 1963, from kidney cancer, presumably aggravated by a police beating. He was buried in Cherkasy.

== Legacy ==
After his death, his satiric tale-poem "Travel to the country of Vice-versa" was published (1964).

The fullest collection of Symonenko's works was published abroad, under the title "Берег чекань" ("Shore of anticipation") in Munich (1963).

In 1967, the publishing house "Smoloskyp" was created in Baltimore by Ukrainian emigrants and named after Vasyl Symonenko.

In December 2008, the National Bank of Ukraine issued into circulation a commemorative coin "Vasyl Symonenko" within "Outstanding Personalities of Ukraine" series.

=== Film adaptation ===
The Ukrainian director Oleksandr Zherebko, having formed a creative tandem with Angelina Dyatlova, created an adaptation of the poetry "You Didn’t Come to Me from a Tale or a Dream" (Ukrainian: “Ти до мене прийшла не із казки чи сну”) by Vasyl Symonenko.

== English translations ==
His works have been translated partially into English.

- Vasyl Symonenko. "Гранітні обеліски. / Granite obelisks". Translated into English by Andriy M Freishyn-Chirovsky. Jersey City: Svoboda. 1975. 143 p. (parallel bilingual texts in both English and Ukrainian)
- Vasyl Symonenko. "Тиша і грім. Вибрані поезії Василя Симоненка / Silence and Thunder: The Selected Poetry of Vasyl Symonenko". Translated into English by Michael M Nayden. Lviv: Piramida. 2017. 128 p. ISBN 978-966-441-470-5 (parallel bilingual texts in both English and Ukrainian)
- Vasyl Symonenko. "Rose Petal Wine". Translated into English by Yuri Tkacz. Melbourne: Bayda Books. 2020. 116 p. ISBN 978-0-908480-48-7

== See also ==
- Bykivnia graves
- Kurds'komu bratovi (Курдському братові)
