= Guttormur J. Guttormsson =

Icelandic-Canadian farmer, playwright, and poet

- Born: Guttormur Jónsson Guttormsson; November 21, 1878; Víðivellir, Riverton, Manitoba
- Died: November 23, 1966 (aged 88); Winnipeg, Manitoba
- Resting place: Riverton Cemetery
- Spouse: Jensina Julia Danielsdottir (m. 1904–1962)

Guttormur J. (Jónsson) Guttormsson (November 21, 1878 – November 23, 1966) was an Icelandic Canadian farmer, playwright, and poet.

== Early life ==
Guttormur was born at Víðivellir, a farm near Riverton, Manitoba, on November 21, 1878. His parents, who immigrated to North America in 1875, were Pálína Ketilsdóttir (1849–1886) from Bakkagerði in East Borgarfjörður and Jón Guttormsson (1841–1896) from Arnheiðarstaðir in Fljótsdál. They died when he was still young. Guttormur had little formal education and, apart from a brief stint as a storekeeper, he spent most of his life working the farm at Víðivellir.

== Career ==
Guttormur was one of the leading poets in the North American Icelandic community in the twentieth century alongside Stephan G. Stephansson and Káinn. Unlike them, Guttormur was born in North America and had no direct personal experience with Iceland nor memories of migrating from there. Yet, though raised in Canada, Guttormur wrote exclusively in Icelandic. Thus, as a poet, he was "moulded by his Canadian environment, yet steeped in Icelandic culture."

During his life, Guttormur published six collections of poetry, biographical essays, and other writings that appeared in newspapers and periodicals. He was most well-known for his poetry and was sometimes referred to as the "Poet Laureate of New Iceland." He was invited to Iceland, Chicago, Canada's west coast, and throughout Manitoba to read his poetry. Yet, his work never reached a broader Canadian audience and, in Iceland, the recognition of his poetry was often symbolic rather than substantial. He was awarded the Distinguished Decoration of the Order of the Falcon (1939) and the Decoration of Grand Knight Commander of the Order of the Falcon (1949) by the Icelandic government.

Guttormur also wrote a number of short plays, ten of which were collected a published in Tíu leikrit (1930), which Watson Kirkconnell described as "an isolated phenomenon in Icelandic-Canadian literature." Guttormur also had a passion for music, teaching himself to read and write music and to play the cornet. He both conducted and performed as a soloist of a local brass band of twenty players.

== Family ==
Guttormur married Jensina Danielsdottir (1884–1962) in 1904 and together they had five children and nine grandchildren.

== Legacy ==
Shortly after Guttormur's death, his family donated his extensive library and his writing desk to the University of Manitoba. They are now housed together in the Icelandic Collection of the Elizabeth Dafoe Library. In 1994, a commemorative marker was erected in Guttormur's honour at the Riverton Centennial Park.

A collection of his poetry selected by his granddaughter Heather Alda Ireland and translated into English was published posthumously as Aurora: English Translations of Icelandic Poems (1993). His Tíu leikrit were translated into English and published in a bilingual edition in 2015. Several of his plays were subsequently performed for the first time in Manitoba and British Columbia.

== Selected list of works ==
- Jón Austfirðingur og nokkur smákvæði (1909)
- Bóndadóttir (1920)
- Gaman og alvara (1930)
- Tíu leikrit (1930)
- Hunangsflugur (1944)
- Kvæðasafn (1947)
- Kanadaþistill (1958)
