= Miklós Toldi =

Hungarian nobleman

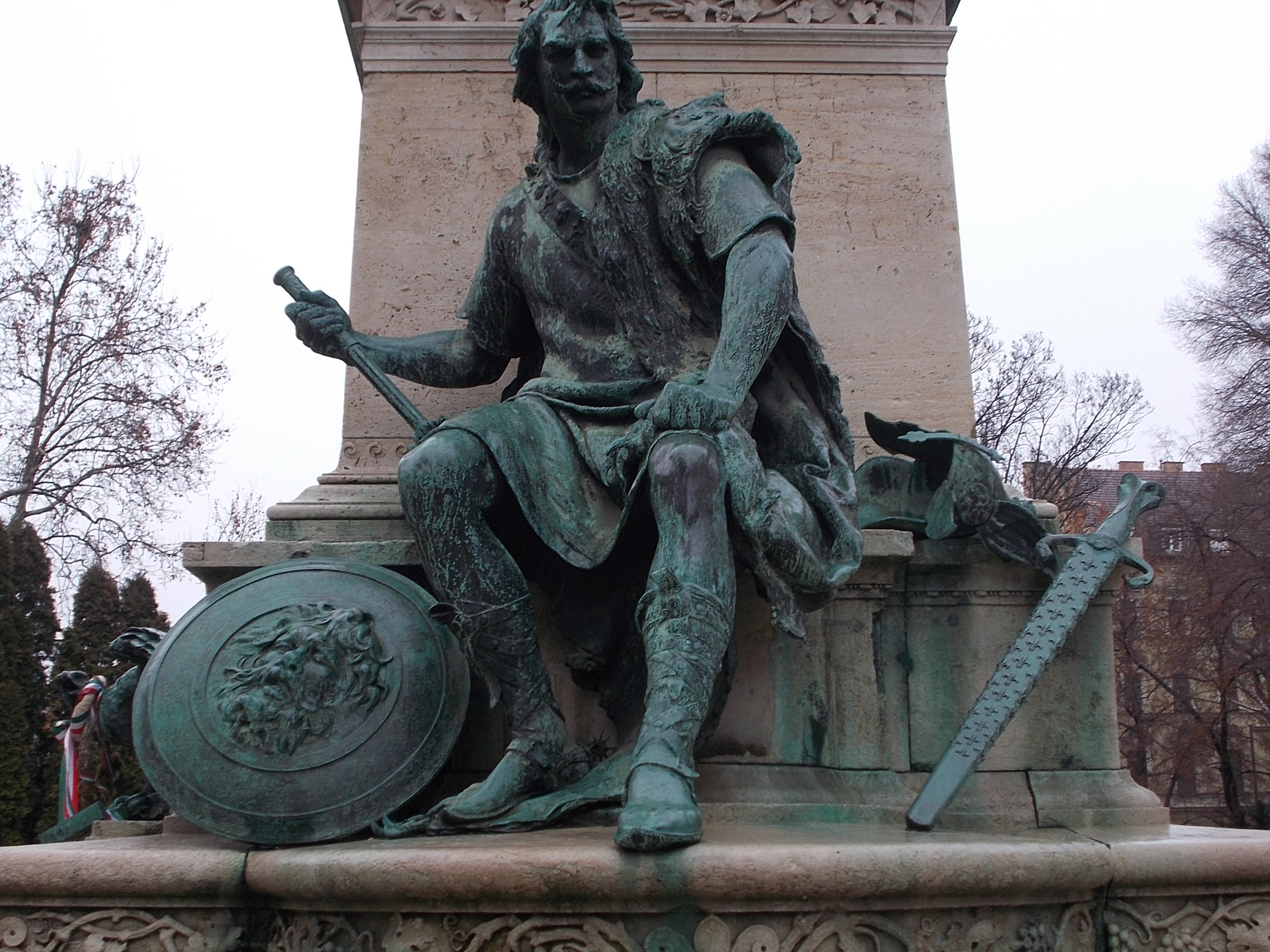
- Known for: Being a famous folklore hero in the Hungarian history
- Born: c. 1320
- Died: November 22, 1390
- Occupation: Soldier; Ispán of Gömör, Heves, Bihar, Szabolcs Counties

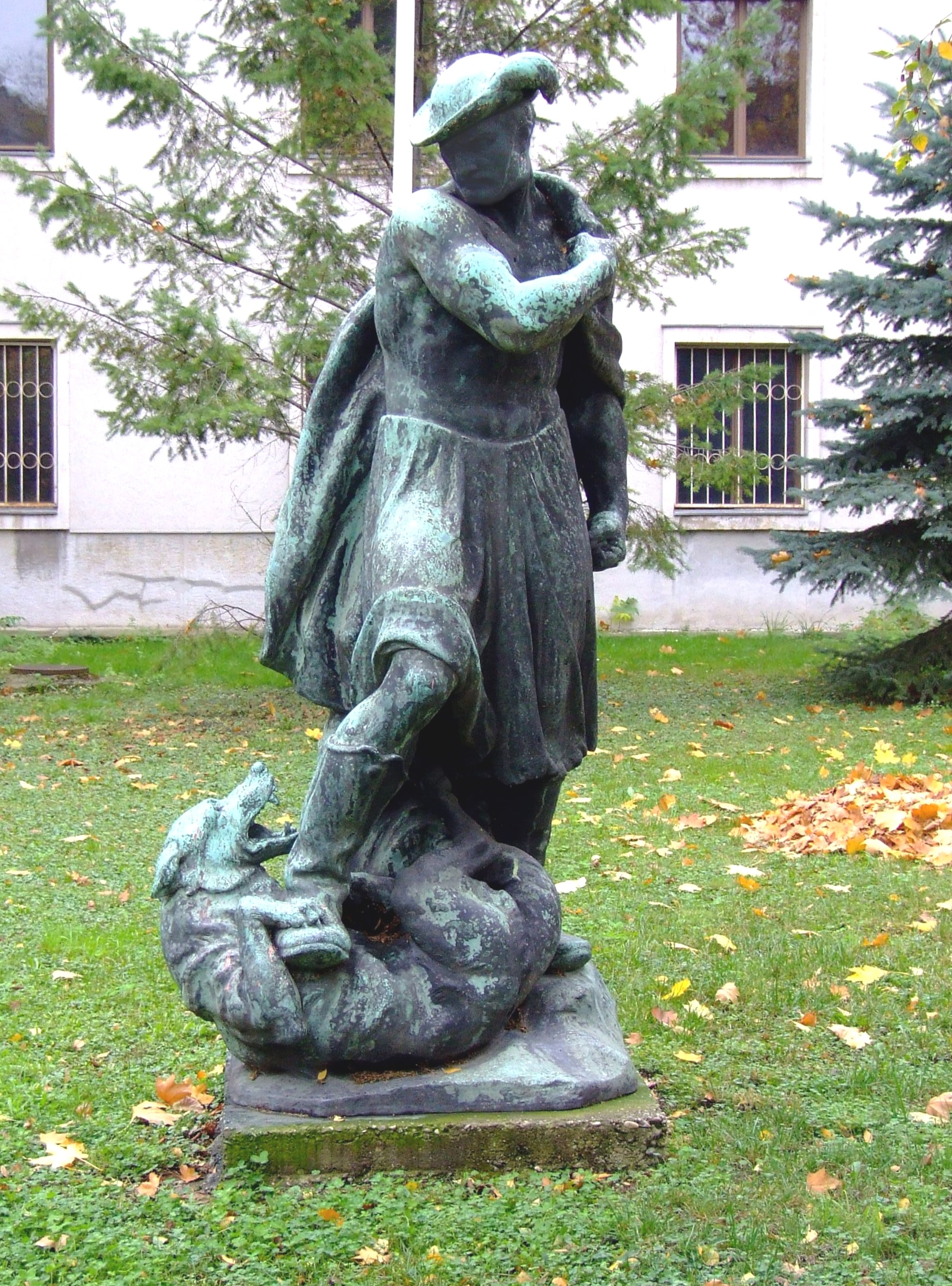
Statue of Toldi in Budapest, Hungary

Miklós Toldi (c. 1320 – November 22, 1390) was a Hungarian nobleman from Bihar County of the Kingdom of Hungary, who is remembered as a legendary strong hero in Hungarian folklore. Hungarian poet János Arany based his famous Toldi trilogy on his legend.

== Life ==
Toldi was long regarded as fictional, with scant historical evidence of his life. However, it has been shown from charters that Miklós Toldi and György Toldi were real persons under kings Charles I and Louis I. He is mentioned in 1354 as the alispán and várnagy of Pozsony County, in 1383 and 1385 as the főispán (English: count) of Szabolcs County. He took part in the campaigns of Louis the Great in Italy as a mercenary leader. In 1359, on request of the king, he brought two lion cubs from Florence. He had to flee his home because he killed a soldier of his brother, György.

== Legacy ==
The earliest and most detailed source about Toldi is Péter Ilosvai Selymes's Az híres nevezetes Toldi Miklósnak jeles cselekedeteiről és bajnokosodásáról való história (Story of the great deeds and braveries of the fabulous Miklós Toldi, Debrecen, 1574).

In folklore, Toldi has been remembered the longest in Nógrád and Bihar County and they emphasize his physical strength but place him a century later in the age of King Matthias Corvinus.

The most famous work is the Toldi trilogy by János Arany. According to tradition, the Stump Tower (Csonka-torony) near Arany's home town of Nagyszalonta had been owned by the Toldi family. Arany's trilogy was adapted into an animated film in the 1980s under the title Heroic Times.

The Toldi, a Hungarian light tank developed and used during World War II, was named after him.
