= Biivtsi =

Rural locality in Poltava Oblast, Ukraine

Biivtsi Біївці
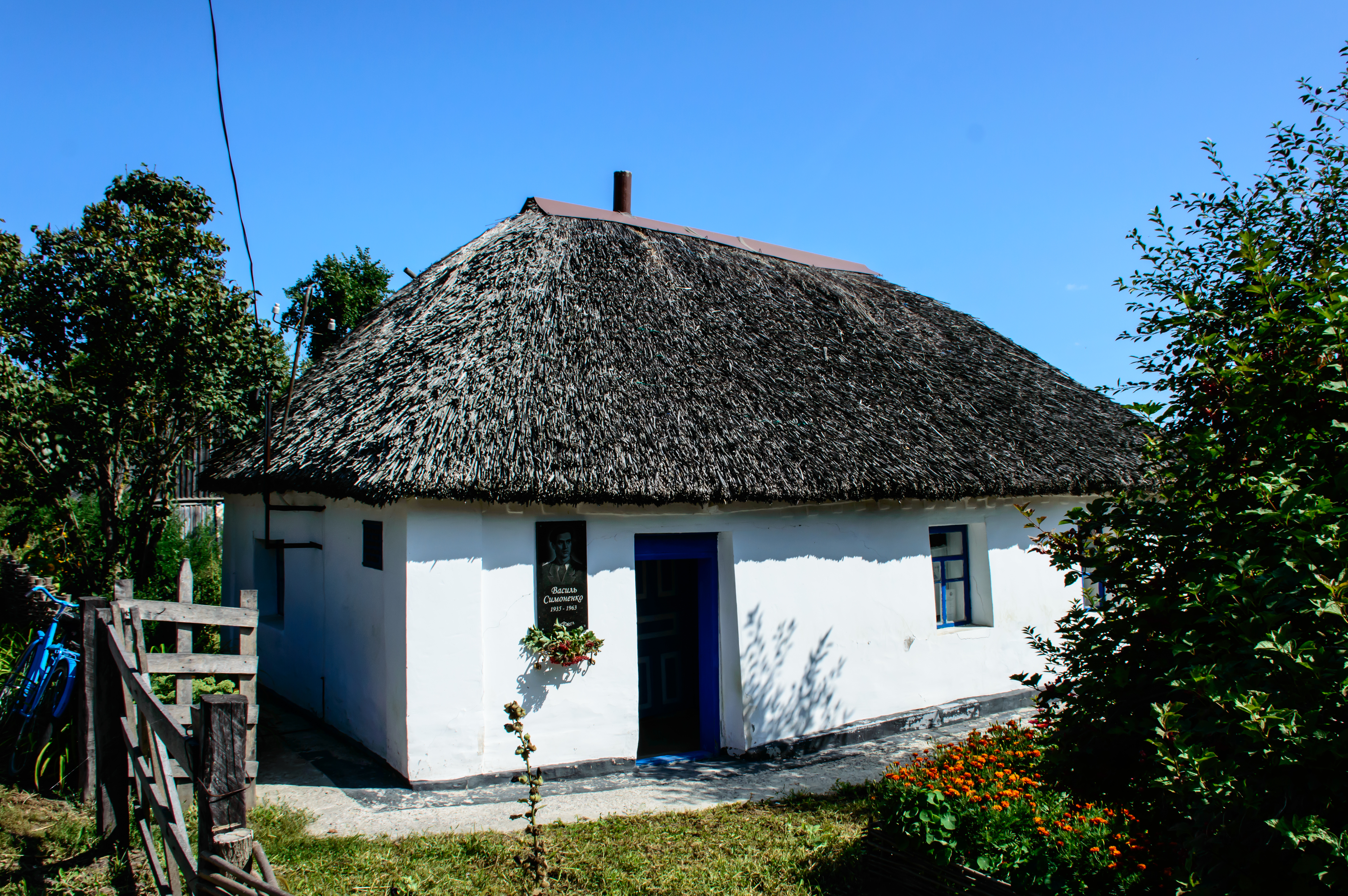
- Vasyl Symonenko's estate-museum in the village of Biivtsi

- Location in Poltava Oblast Biivtsi (Ukraine)
- Coordinates: 50°8′37″N 32°54′9″E
- Country: Ukraine
- Oblast: Poltava Oblast
- Raion: Lubny Raion
- Hromada: Novoorzhytske settlement hromada
- Time zone: UTC+2 (EET)
  - Summer (DST): UTC+3 (EEST)
- Postal code: 37523

Biivtsi (Ukrainian: Біївці) is a village in the Novoorzhytske settlement hromada of the Lubny Raion of Poltava Oblast in Ukraine.

== History ==
The first written mention of the village was in 1702.

On 19 July 2020, as a result of the administrative-territorial reform and liquidation of the Lubny Raion, the village became part of the Lubny Raion.

== Notable residents ==
- Vasyl Symonenko (1935–1963), Ukrainian poet, journalist, activist of dissident movement
