= Port Hope High School =

Location
- 130 Highland Drive; Port Hope, Ontario, L1A 2A3; Canada
- Coordinates: 43.9576°N 78.3094°W

Information
- School type: Secondary
- Motto: Praevalibit Veritas ("Truth will prevail")
- Founded: 1853 (as Port Hope Grammar School); 1871 (as Port Hope High School)
- School board: Kawartha Pine Ridge District School Board
- Principal: Tracy McCarthy
- Grades: 9 - 12
- Language: English, French
- Colours: Blue and White
- Team name: Spartans
- Website: porthopehigh.kprdsb.ca/About%20Us/School%20Information

Port Hope High School is a high school and former Grammar school in Port Hope, Ontario.

== History ==
Founded as Port Hope Grammar School in 1853, it existed as grammar and then as a high school from 1850s to 1870s:

- Union Grammar School 1856-1872 - first located in Town Hall and then to Knowlson's Building in 1866
- Old Kirk site 1873-1897 - school building purchased due to overcrowding at Union site; building since demolished
- Central High School / Pine High School 1897-1956 - school building closed as Dr. Hawkins in 2000 and is now Pines of Port Hope condominium project

After provincial education reforms in 1871, the old Grammar school broke away from the linked Common school (which then renamed Public School) to become a standalone high school.

The current site was built in 1956 with additions added in 1962 and 1970.

The school's honour roll for those students whom served in World War I and World War II were transferred to Port Hope Archives in 2015.

The school shares its building with Dr. M.S. Hawkins, a middle school for Grades 7-8. The High School inhabits the West area of the building, while the Middle School claims the East.

== See also ==
- Education in Ontario
- List of secondary schools in Ontario
