= Frigyes Riedl =

Hungarian essayist, critic and literature historian

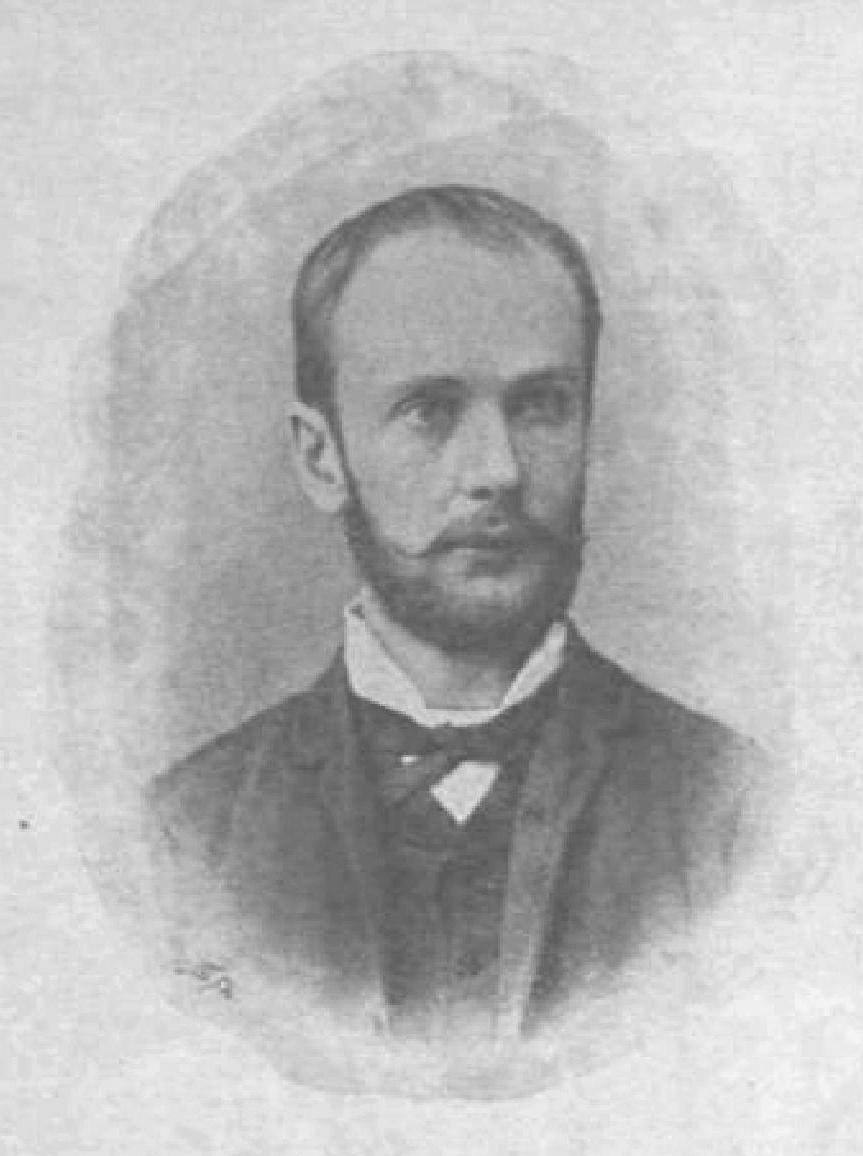
Frigyes Riedl

Frigyes Riedl (September 12, 1856 in Ladomér – August 7, 1921 in Budapest) was a prominent Hungarian essayist, critic and literary historian. His most famous work is Arany János (1887), the earliest study of poet János Arany. He is also noted for his books on eighteenth- and nineteenth-century Hungarian literature, and for A History of Hungarian Literature (1906), which was intended as a primer for English-speaking audiences unfamiliar with Hungarian literature. He was a professor of Hungarian literature at the University of Budapest and a regular contributor to the literary review Budapesti Szemle. With other Hungarian literary figures, especially Jenõ Péterfy, he tried to establish unique criteria for Hungarian literary criticism.
