= Dalriada (band) =

Hungarian folk metal band

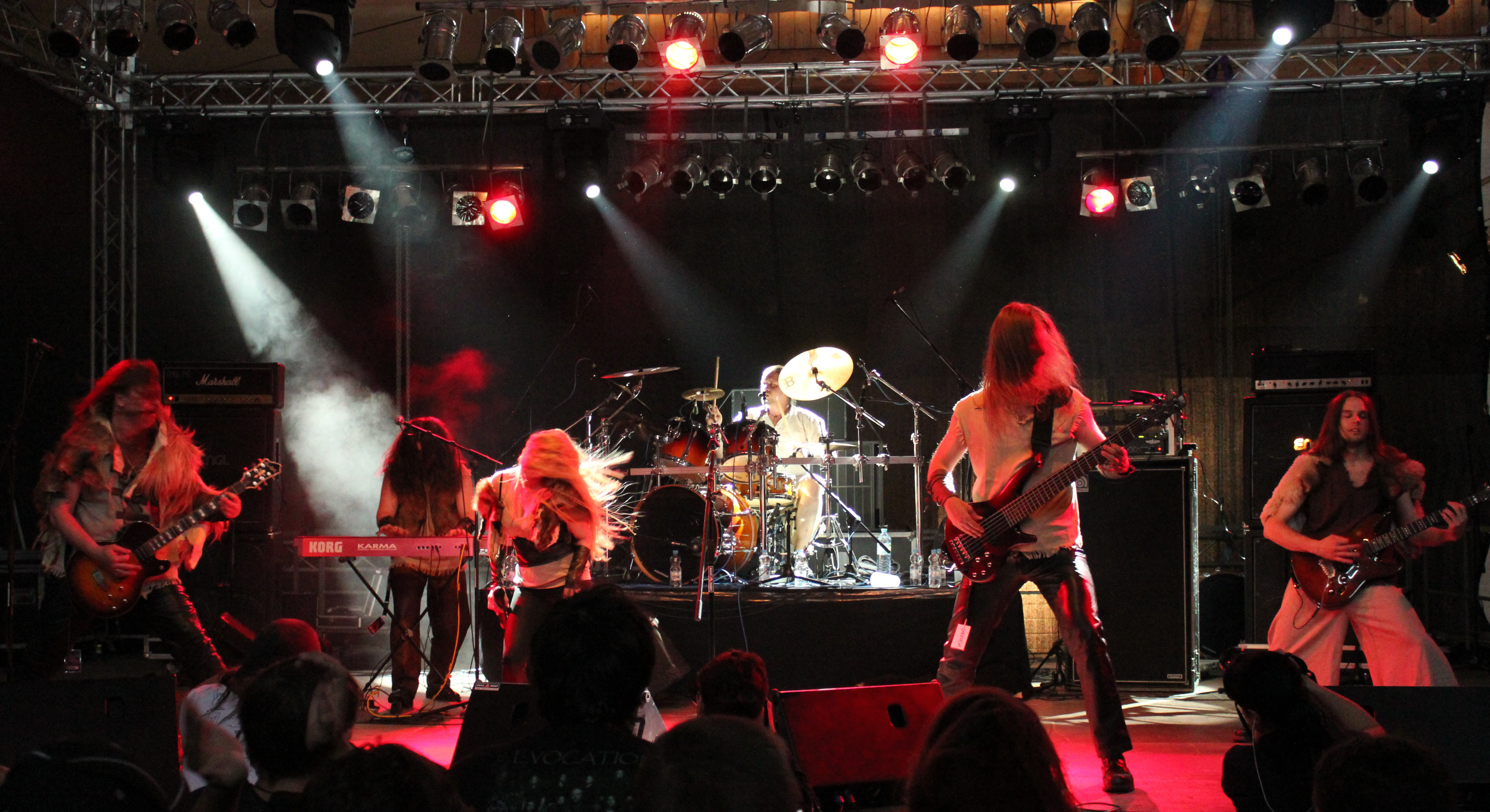
- Dalriada at the 2011 Ragnarök Festival

Background information
- Origin: Hungary
- Genre: Folk metal
- Years active: 1998–present
- Label: AFM Records
- Members: Laura Binder; András Ficzek; István Molnár; Mátyás Németh-Szabó; Ádám Monostori; Gergely Szabó; Ádám Csete
- Website: www.dalriada.hu

Dalriada is a Hungarian folk metal band from Sopron, Hungary that was formed in 1998 as Echo of Dalriada, but shortened their name to Dalriada in late 2006. Their third studio album Kikelet and all subsequent albums were successful in the top ten of the official Mahasz music charts. Their Arany-album won the 2009 HangSúly Hungarian Metal Awards out of 70 contestants. In 2012, the band toured through Europe with Arkona and Darkest Era.

== Album titles ==
The titles of their albums are supposed to be ancient Hungarian names of months (which are not used today). In fact they originate from the folk-history work "Arvisurák" by Hungarian writer Zoltán Paál and are not based on any scientific evidence. Specifically, "Fergeteg" is, according to Paál, the ancient name of January, "Jégbontó" is February, "Kikelet" is March, "Szelek" is April, "Ígéret" is May, "Napisten" is June, "Áldás" is July, "Új Kenyér" is August, "Őszelő" is September, "Magvető" is October, "Enyészet" is November, and "Álom" is December. Arany-Album and Forrás are exceptions, the former contains the poems of János Arany, a Hungarian poet from the 19th century, and the latter - which is an acoustic album - translates as "Source", or "Spring".

The band claim that their attempt to compete in the Eurovision Song Contest was disallowed because their music contains traditional folk tunes.

== Members ==
Current line-up

- Laura Binder – vocals (2001–present)
- András Ficzek – vocals (1998–present), guitars (2000–present)
- Mátyás Németh-Szabó – guitar (2006–present)
- Gergely Szabó "Szög" – keyboards, backing vocals (2014–present)
- István Molnár – bass (2008–present)
- Ádám Monostori – drums (2018–present)

Session musicians

- Attila Fajkusz – violin, tambourine, backing vocals (2007, 2009–present)
- Ernő Szőke – doublebass (2009–present)
- Gergely Szőke – viola, lute, acoustic guitars (2009–present)

Former and past members

- Péter Hende – guitars (1998 – 2001†)
- Marcell Fispán – guitars (1998–2005)
- Tadeusz Rieckmann – drums (2001–2018)
- György Varga – bass, harsh vocals (2002–2008)
- Gergely Nagy – keyboards (2003–2006)
- András Kurz – keyboards (2006–2009)
- Barnabás Ungár – keyboards, backing vocals, harsh vocals (2009–2014)
- Ádám Csete – bagpipe, flutes, backing vocals (2012–2019)

Timeline

== Discography ==
Year	Album name	Album type	Label	Hungarian Top 40 Album Charts
2003	A walesi bárdok	demo	Self-released	—
2004	Fergeteg	studio	Hammer Music / Nail Records	29
2006	Jégbontó	studio	Hammer Music / Nail Records	13
2007	Kikelet	studio	Hammer Music / Nail Records	4
2008	Szelek	studio	Hammer Music / Nail Records	2
2009	Arany-album	studio	Hammer Music / Nail Records	4
2011	Ígéret	studio	AFM Records	6
2012	Napisten Hava	studio	Hammer Music / Nail Records	3
2015	Mesék, Álmok, Regék	compilation	Hammer Music / Nail Records	11
2015	Áldás	studio	Hammer Music / Nail Records	2
2016	Forrás	studio	Hammer Music / Nail Records	11
2018	Nyárutó	studio	Hammer Music / Nail Records	1
2021	Őszelő	studio	H-Music Hungary	1
2021	Hazatérés – 15 év Dalriada	live	H-Music Hungary	

== Music videos ==
Title	Year
Téli Ének	2006
A Nap és Szél Háza	2008
Hazatérés	2008
Hajdútánc	2011
A Dudás	2012
Áldás	2016
Búsirató	2017
Betyár-altató	2021
