= Toldi trilogy =

Epic poem trilogy by János Arany

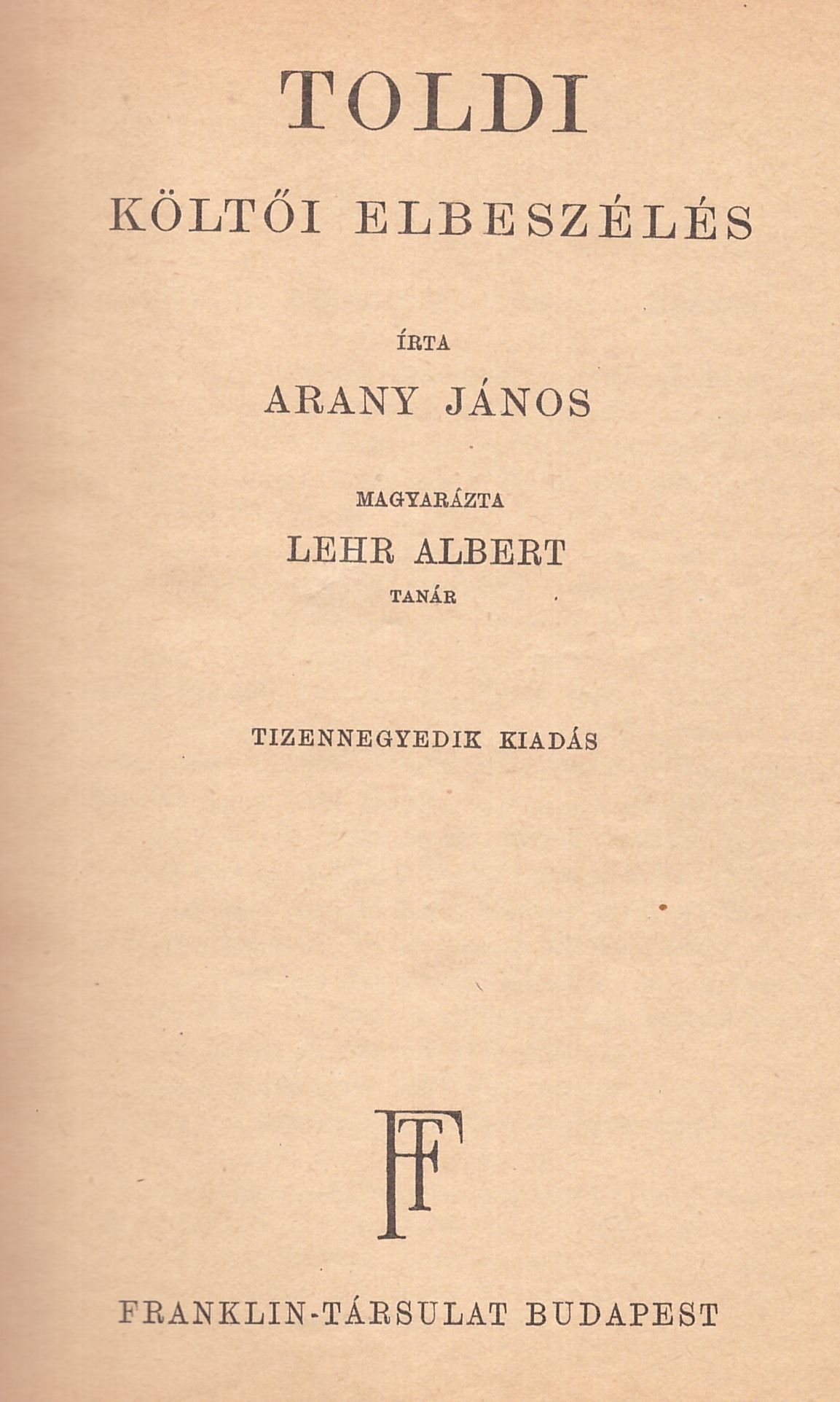
11th edition of the Toldi

The Toldi trilogy is an epic poem trilogy by the Hungarian poet János Arany, inspired by the legendary Miklós Toldi, who served in the Hungarian King Louis the Great's army in the 14th century. The trilogy recounted the medieval stories of Toldi as the king's champion.

The trilogy comprises:

- Toldi (1846)
- Toldi szerelme (Toldi's Love) (1879)
- Toldi estéje (Toldi's Night) (1848)

The trilogy was adapted as an animated film under the title Heroic Times in the 1980s, directed by József Gémes for the Pannonia Film Studio.

The first part of the trilogy was written for an organization led by Károly Kisfaludy.

Another animated film adaptation was released in 2022 by animator and film director Marcell Jankovics.
