= János Arany =

Hungarian poet (1817–1882)

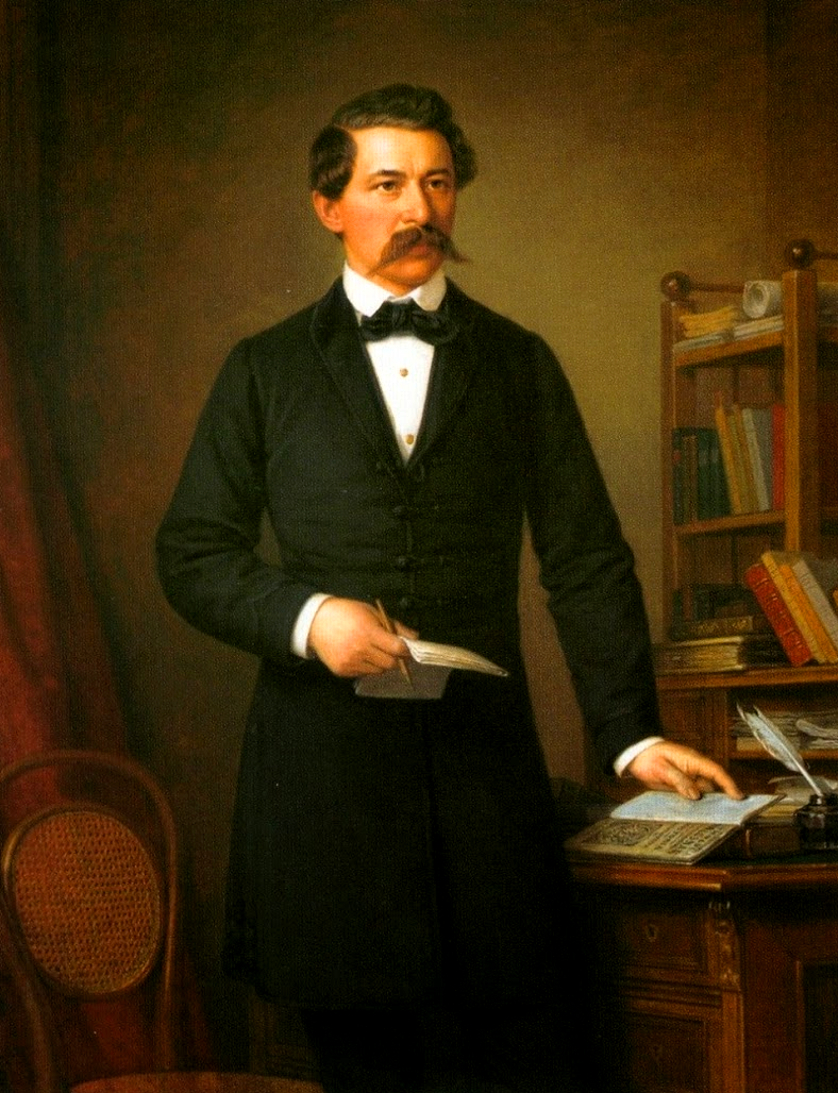
- Born: 2 March 1817; Nagyszalonta, Kingdom of Hungary, Austrian Empire (now Salonta, Romania)
- Died: 22 October 1882 (aged 65); Budapest, Austria-Hungary
- Education: University of Debrecen
- Occupations: Journalist; writer; poet; translator; teacher
- Spouse: Julianna Ercsey
- Writing career
- Language: Hungarian
- Notable works: Toldi trilogy, The Bards of Wales

János Arany (Hungarian pronunciation: [ˈjaːnoʃ ˈɒrɒɲ]; archaic English: John Arany; 2 March 1817 – 22 October 1882) was a Hungarian poet, writer, translator and journalist. He is often said to be the "Shakespeare of ballads" – he wrote more than 102 ballads that have been translated into over 50 languages, as well as the Toldi trilogy.

== Biography ==
He was born in Nagyszalonta, Bihar County, Kingdom of Hungary, Austrian Empire. He was the youngest of ten children, but because of tuberculosis running in the family, only two of them lived beyond childhood. At the time of his birth, his older sister Sára was already married and his parents, György Arany and Sára Megyeri, were 60 and 44 years old, respectively. János Arany learned to read and write early on, and was reported to read anything he could find in Hungarian and Latin. Since his parents needed support early in Arany's life, he began working at the age of 14 as an associate teacher.

From 1833 he attended the Reformed College of Debrecen where he studied German and French, though he quickly became tired of scholarly life, and temporarily joined an acting troupe. Later on, he worked in Nagyszalonta, Debrecen, and Budapest as teacher, newspaper editor, and in various clerk positions.

In 1840 he married Julianna Ercsey (1816–1885). They had two children, Julianna, whose early death by pneumonia devastated the poet, and László, who also became a poet and a collector of Hungarian folktales.

In 1847, he won the competition of the Kisfaludy Society (Kisfaludy Társaság) with his writing, "Toldi".

After Toldi, one of his most famous works, was published, he and Sándor Petőfi became close friends. Petőfi's death in the Hungarian Revolution of 1848 had a great impact on him.

He was employed as a teacher in Nagykőrös where the local museum is named after him.

Arany was elected a member of the Hungarian Academy of Sciences (Magyar Tudományos Akadémia, MTA for short) in 1858. He was the secretary-general of the Academy from 1865. Also, he was elected director of the Kisfaludy Society, the greatest literary association of Hungary.

The early death of his daughter, Julianna in 1865 marked the beginning of Arany's hiatus as a poet. He did not write any original pieces until the summer of 1877, when he began working on his poetic cycle entitled Őszikék which is substantially different from his previous works, concerning themes like elderliness, or the imminence of death.

Arany died in Budapest on 22 October 1882.

== Works ==
He translated three dramas of Shakespeare into Hungarian, A Midsummer Night's Dream, Hamlet and King John, and they are considered to be some of the greatest translations into Hungarian in history; he also helped other Hungarian translators with his comments, and translated works by Aristophanes, Mikhail Lermontov, Aleksandr Pushkin, and Molière.

The epic poetry of János Arany presents the legendary and historical past of his nation. The Death of King Buda (1864), the first part of a projected Hun trilogy is one of the best narrative poems in Hungarian literature. The other parts of the trilogy (Ildikó, and Prince Csaba) are unfinished. The proposed trilogy used Arnold Ipolyi's Magyar Mythologia as a source. Arany's works have shaped the popular impression of Hungarian history (at the expense of the actual historical record).

One of his most famous poems is A Walesi Bárdok (The Bards of Wales). Arany wrote this poem when Franz Joseph I of Austria visited Hungary for the first time after defeating the Hungarian Revolution of 1848. Originally Arany was asked to write a poem to praise the Emperor but he wrote a piece concerning the campaigns of Edward I of England to subjugate the Welsh and trample over their culture. Arany was drawing a parallel here with Austria's treatment of Hungary and the Hungarians.

His poem Dante is one of those few verses in Western literature that can seize concisely the whole meaning and transcendency of human life (Peter Ustinov – British actor).

Some remarkable pieces of Arany's works have been translated to English by Watson Kirkconnell and by Edward Dundas Butler.

Arany is today considered one of the greatest Hungarian poets beside Sándor Petőfi, Endre Ady, Miklós Radnóti and Attila József.

== Legacy ==
The first scientific monograph on Arany was written by Frigyes Riedl.

The Arany-album, a Folk metal album by Hungarian band Dalriada is based on popular works by Arany. It won the 2009 HangSúly Hungarian Metal Awards out of 70 contestants.

- A postage stamp was issued on 1 July 1932 to honor Arany.
- On 15 September 1957 another postage stamp was issued.
- On 10 July 2017 a souvenir sheet of four stamps was issued.

=== Poems in English translation ===
- Dante
- The Legend of the Miraculous Hind or The Legend of the Wondrous Hunt
- Years, O Years That Are Still to Come
- I Lay Down the Lyre
- In Autumn
- Retrospect
- Memorials
- The Bards of Wales (A Walesi Bárdok)
- On the Slope
- Family Circle (Családi Kör)
- The Nightingale
- Reply to Petőfi (Válasz Petőfinek)
- The Mother of King Matthias
- The Two Pages of Szondi (Szondi Két Apródja)
- Duel at Midnight
- Bier-right or Ordeal by Blood
- Becky Scarlet
- Corn Husking
- Annie with Golden Hair
- The Seamstress Girls
- Consecration of the Bridge
- Mistress Aggie / Mistress Agnes
- Imprisoned Souls
