= List of compositions by Béla Bartók =

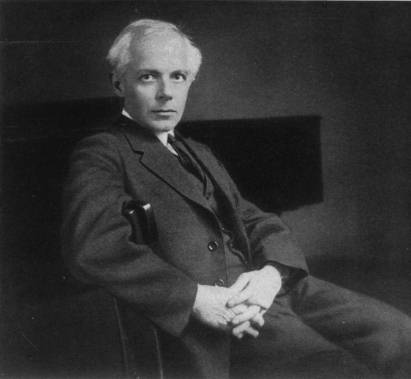
Béla Bartók in 1927

This is a list of compositions by Béla Bartók. The catalogue numbering by András Szőllősy (Sz.), László Somfai (BB) and Denijs Dille (DD) are provided, as well as Bartók's own opus numbers. Note that Bartók started three times anew with opus numbers, here indicated with "(list 1)", "(list 2)" and "(list 3)" respectively. The pieces from the third listing are by far best known; opus lists 1 and 2 are early works. The year of composition and instrumentation (including voice) are included. See the main article on Béla Bartók for more details.

== Catalogue numberings, year of composition and instrumentation ==
| Name (♦ = lost work) | Sz. | BB | DD | Opus | Year (Note: rev = revised; orch = orchestrated; pub = published; cmpl = completed) | Instruments/voices used |
|---|---|---|---|---|---|---|
| Walzer | 1 | 1 | 1 | 1 (list 1) | 1890 | Piano |
| Changing Piece (Változó darab) | | 1 | 2 | 2 (list 1) | 1890 | Piano |
| Mazurka | 2 | 1 | 3 | 3 (list 1) | 1890 | Piano |
| Budapest Athletic Competition | | 1 | 4 | 4 (list 1) | 1890 | Piano |
| Sonatina No. 1 | | 1 | 5 | 5 (list 1) | 1890 | Piano |
| Wallachian Piece (Oláh darab) | | 1 | 6 | 6 (list 1) | 1890 | Piano |
| Fast Polka (Gyorspolka) | | 1 | 7 | 7 (list 1) | 1891 | Piano |
| 'Béla' Polka | | 1 | 8 | 8 (list 1) | 1891 | Piano |
| 'Katinka' Polka | | 1 | 9 | 9 (list 1) | 1891 | Piano |
| Voices of Spring (Tavaszi hangok) | | 1 | 10 | 10 (list 1) | 1891 | Piano |
| 'Jolán' Polka | | 1 | 11 | 11 (list 1) | 1891 | Piano |
| 'Gabi' Polka | | 1 | 12 | 12 (list 1) | 1891 | Piano |
| Forget-me-not (Nefelejts) | | 1 | 13 | 13 (list 1) | 1891 | Piano |
| Ländler No. 1 | | 1 | 14 | 14 (list 1) | 1891 | Piano |
| 'Irma' Polka | | 1 | 15 | 15 (list 1) | 1891 | Piano |
| Radegund Echo (Radegundi visszhang) | | 1 | 16 | 16 (list 1) | 1891 | Piano |
| March (Induló) | | 1 | 17 | 17 (list 1) | 1891 | Piano |
| Ländler No. 2 | | 1 | 18 | 18 (list 1) | 1891 | Piano |
| Circus Polka (Cirkusz polka) | | 1 | 19 | 19 (list 1) | 1891 | Piano |
| The Course of the Danube (A Duna folyása) | 4 | 1 | 20 | 20 (list 1) | 1891 | Piano |
| The Course of the Danube (A Duna folyása) | 4 | 1 | 20b | 20 (list 1) | 1894 | Violin and piano |
| Sonatina No. 2 | | 1 | 21 | 21 (list 1) | 1891? | Piano |
| Ländler No. 3 ♦ | | 1 | 22 | 22 (list 1) | 1892 | Piano |
| Spring Song | | 1 | 23 | 23 (list 1) | 1892 | Piano |
| Szöllős Piece (Szöllősi darab) ♦ | | 1 | 24 | 24 (list 1) | 1892 | Piano |
| 'Margit' Polka | | 1 | 25 | 25 (list 1) | 1893 | Piano |
| 'Ilona' Mazurka | | 1 | 26 | 26 (list 1) | 1893 | Piano |
| 'Loli' Mazurka | | 1 | 27 | 27 (list 1) | 1893 | Piano |
| 'Lajos' Waltz ('Lajos' valczer) | | 1 | 28 | 28 (list 1) | 1893 | Piano |
| 'Elza' Polka | | | 29 | 29 (list 1) | 1894 | Piano |
| Andante con variazioni | | 1 | 30 | 30 (list 1) | 1894 | Piano |
| X.Y. ♦ | | 1 | 31 | 31 (list 1) | 1894 | Piano |
| Sonata No. 1 in G minor | | 2 | 32 | 1 (list 2) | 1894 | Piano |
| Scherzo in G minor | | | 33 | | 1894 | Piano |
| Fantasie in A minor | | 3 | 34 | 2 (list 2) | 1895 | Piano |
| Sonata No. 2 in F major | | 4 | 35 | 3 (list 2) | 1895 | Piano |
| Capriccio in B minor | | 5 | 36 | 4 (list 2) | 1895 | Piano |
| Violin Sonata in C minor | | 6 | 37 | 5 (list 2) | 1895 | Violin and piano |
| Sonata No. 3 in C major ♦ | | 7 | 38 | 6 (list 2) | 1895 | Piano |
| Pieces ♦ | | 7 | 39 | 7 (list 2) | 1895 | Violin |
| Fantasia ♦ | | 7 | 40 | 8 (list 2) | 1894 | Violin |
| Fantasia ♦ | | 7 | 41 | 9 (list 2) | 1895 | Violin |
| String Quartet (No. 1) in B major ♦ | | 7 | 42 | 10 (list 2) | 1896 | String quartet |
| String Quartet (No. 2) in C minor ♦ | | 7 | 43 | 11 (list 2) | 1896 | String quartet |
| Andante, Scherzo and Finale ♦ | | 7 | 44 | 12 (list 2) | 1897 | Piano |
| Pieces (3) | | 8 | 45 | 13 (list 2) | 1897 | Piano |
| Piano Quintet in C major ♦ | | 9 | 46 | 14 (list 2) | 1897 | Piano quintet |
| Pieces (2) ♦ | | 9 | 47 | 15 (list 2) | 1897 | Piano |
| Great Fantasy ♦ | | 9 | 48 | 16 (list 2) | 1897 | Piano |
| Violin Sonata in A major ♦ | | 10 | 49 | 17 (list 2) | 1897 | Violin and piano |
| Scherzo or Fantasie | 8 | 11 | 50 | 18 (list 2) | 1897 | Piano |
| Sonata “Opus 1” | | 12 | 51 | 19 (list 2) | 1898 | Piano |
| Piano Quartet in C minor | 9 | 13 | 52 | 20 (list 2) | 1898 | Piano quartet |
| Piano Pieces (3 Fantasies) | 6 | 14 | 53 | 21 (list 2) | 1898 | Piano |
| Songs (3) | 10 | 15 | 54 | | 1898 | Voice and piano |
| Scherzo in B minor | | 16 | 55 | | 1898 | Piano |
| String Quartet in F major | | 17 | 56 | | 1898 | String quartet |
| Piano Quintet Fragments | | 19 | B10 12 | | 1899 | Piano quintet |
| 'Tiefblaue Veilchen' | | 18 | 57 | | 1899 | Soprano and orchestra |
| Scherzo in Sonata Form | | 19 | 58 | | 1899–1900 | String quartet |
| Scherzo in B♭ minor | | 19 | 59 | | 1900? | Piano |
| Dances (6) | 54 | 19 | 60 | | 1900 | Piano |
| Valcer | | | 60b | | 1900 | Orchestra |
| Liebeslieder | 13 | 20 | 62 | | 1899 | Voice and piano |
| Scherzo in B♭ minor | | 21 | 63 | | 1900 | Piano |
| Variations on a Theme by F.F. | | 22 | 64 | | 1900–01 | Piano |
| Scherzo | 17 | 25 | 65 | | 1901 | Orchestra |
| Tempo di minuetto | | 23 | 66 | | 1901 | Piano |
| Songs (4) | 15 | 24 | 67 | | 1902 | Voice and piano |
| Symphony (only Scherzo) | 16 | 25 | 68 | | 1902–03 | Orchestra |
| Duo | | 26 | 69 | | 1902 | Two violins |
| Albumblatt (Andante) in A major | | 26 | 70 | | 1902 | Violin and piano |
| Piano Pieces (4) (Négy zongoradarab) | 22 | 27 | 71 | | 1903 | Piano |
| Andante in F♯ major (or A major) | | 26 | 71 B14 | | 1902 | Violin and piano |
| Violin Sonata in E minor | 20 | 28 | 72 | | 1903 | Violin and piano |
| 'Este' (Evening) for Voice and Piano | | 29 | 73 | | 1903 | Voice and piano |
| 'Este' (Evening) for Male Chorus | 19 | 30 | 74 | | 1903 | Male chorus and orchestra |
| Kossuth, symphonic poem | 21 | 31 | 75a | | 1903 | Orchestra |
| Marcia Funèbre (from Kossuth) | 21 | 31 | 75b | | 1903 | Piano |
| Songs (4) ♦ | 18 | 32 | 76 | | 1903 | Voice and piano |
| Piano Quintet in C major | 23 | 33 | 77 | | 1903–04 | Piano quintet |
| Rhapsody for Piano | 26 | 36a | | 1 (list 3) | 1904 | Piano |
| Rhapsody for Piano and Orchestra | 27 | 36b | | 1 (list 3) | 1905 | Piano and orchestra |
| Scherzo Burlesque for Piano and Orchestra | 28 | 35 | | 2 (list 3) | 1904 | Piano and orchestra |
| Hungarian Folksongs (Magyar népdalok) | 29 | 37 | | | 1904, 1905 | Voice and piano |
| Székely Folksongs (Piros alma) | 30 | 34 | | | 1904, 1905 | Voice and piano |
| Petits morceaux (from BB 37 (No.2) and BB 24 (No.1) | | 38 | 67/1 | | 1905, 1907? | Piano |
| Suite No. 1 | 31 | 39 | | 3 (list 3) | 1905, rev c.1920 | Orchestra |
| To the Little 'Tot', (5) Songs | 32 | 41 | | | 1905 | Voice and piano |
| Hungarian Folksongs, Songs (10) | 33 | 42 | | | 1906, rev BB97 1928 | Voice and piano |
| Hungarian Folksongs, Songs (10) | 33a | 43 | | | 1906–07 | Voice and piano |
| Hungarian Folksongs (2) | 33b | 44 | | | 1906 | Voice and piano |
| Suite No. 2 | 34 | 40 | | 4 (list 3) | 1905, 1907 rev 1943 | Small orchestra |
| From Gyergyó | 35 | 45a | | | 1907 | Voice (or reed pipe) and piano |
| Hungarian Folksongs from Csík (3) | 35a | 45b | | | 1907 | Piano |
| Four Slovak Folksongs | 35b | 46 | | | c. 1907 | Voice and piano |
| Eight Hungarian Folksongs | 64 | 47 | | | 1907 (No.6–8 1917) | Voice and piano |
| Violin Concerto No. 1 | 36 | 48a | | | 1907–08, publ. 1956 | Violin and orchestra |
| Portraits (2) | 37 | 48b | | 5 (list 3) | 1907–11 | Violin and orchestra |
| Bagatelles (14) | 38 | 50 | | 6 (list 3) | 1908 | Piano |
| Easy Pieces (10) | 39 | 51 | | | 1908 | Piano |
| String Quartet No. 1 | 40 | 52 | | 7 (list 3) | 1908–09 | String quartet |
| Elegies (2) | 41 | 49 | | 8b (list 3) | 1908–09 | Piano |
| For Children (4 volumes in 2 books) | 42 | 53 | | | 1908–09 | Piano |
| Romanian Dances (2) | 43 | 56 | | 8a (list 3) | 1910 | Piano |
| Dirges (4) | 45 | 58 | | 9a (list 3) | 1910 | Piano |
| Sketches (7) (Vázlatok) | 44 | 54 | | 9b (list 3) | 1908–10 | Piano |
| Pictures for Orchestra (2) | 46 | 59 | | 10 (list 3) | 1910 | Orchestra |
| Burlesques (3) (Három burleszk) | 47 | 55 | | 8c (list 3) | 1908–11 | Piano |
| Romanian Dance (one from BB 56) | 47a | 61 | | | 1911 | Orchestra |
| Bluebeard's Castle, Opera in One Act | 48 | 62 | | 11 (list 3) | 1911 rev 1912 & 1917 | Voice and orchestra |
| Allegro barbaro | 49 | 63 | | | 1911 | Piano |
| Old Hungarian Folksongs (4) | 50 | 60 | | | 1910 rev 1926 | Male chorus w/o orchestra |
| Pieces (4) | 51 | 64 | | 12 (list 3) | 1912 / orch. in 1921 | Orchestra |
| Piano étude (Reschofsky) | 52 | | | | 1913 | Piano |
| The First Term at the Piano | 53 | 66 | | | 1913 | Piano |
| Sonatina | 55 | 69 | | | 1915 | Piano |
| Romanian Folk Dances | 56 | 68 | | | 1915 | Piano |
| Romanian Christmas Carols | 57 | 67 | | | 1915 | Piano |
| Romanian Folk Songs (2) | 58 | 57 | | | c. 1909 | Women choir |
| Romanian Folksongs (9) | 59 | 65 | | | 1915 (or earlier) | Voice and piano |
| The Wooden Prince, Ballet in One Act | 60 | 74 | | 13 (list 3) | 1914–17 | Orchestra |
| The Wooden Prince, Suite | | 74 | | 13 (list 3) | 1921, 1924? | Orchestra |
| Piano Suite | 62 | 70 | | 14 (list 3) | 1916 | Piano |
| Songs (5) | 61 | 71 | | 15 (list 3) | 1916 | Voice and piano |
| Songs (5) | 63 | 72 | | 16 (list 3) | 1916 | Voice and piano |
| Slovak Folksong | 63a | 73 | | | 1916? | Voice and piano |
| Hungarian Folksong | 65 | | | | 1914/17? | Piano |
| Hungarian Folktunes (3) | 66 | 80b | | | 1914–18 rev 1941 | Piano |
| String Quartet No. 2 | 67 | 75 | | 17 (list 3) | 1915–17 | String quartet |
| Romanian Folkdances for small orchestra (from BB 68) | 68 | 76 | | | 1917 | Piano and orchestra |
| Slovak Folksongs (5) for Male Chorus | 69 | 77 | | | 1917 | Male chorus w/o orchestra |
| Slovak Folksongs (4) for Mixed Choir | 70 | 78 | | | 1916 or 1917 | Mixed choir w/o orchestra |
| Hungarian Peasant Songs (15) | 71 | 79 | | | 1914–18 | Piano |
| Leszállott a páva | | 80 | | | 1914 | Piano |
| Studies | 72 | 81 | | 18 (list 3) | 1918 | Piano |
| The Miraculous Mandarin, Pantomime | 73 | 82 | | 19 (list 3) | 1918–19, 1924 | Orchestra (with choir) |
| The Miraculous Mandarin, Suite | 73 | 82 | | 19 (list 3) | 1918, cmpl in 1926 | Orchestra |
| Improvisations on Hungarian Peasant Songs (8) | 74 | 83 | | 20 (list 3) | 1920 | Piano |
| Violin Sonata No. 1 in C♯ minor | 75 | 84 | | 21 (list 3) | 1921 | Violin and piano |
| Violin Sonata No. 2 | 76 | 85 | | | 1922 | Violin and piano |
| Dance Suite | 77 | 86 | | | 1923 | Orchestra |
| Dance Suite | 77 | 86 | | | 1925 | Piano |
| Village Scenes (Falún), a.k.a. Slovak Songs (5) | 78 | 87a | | | 1924 | Female voice and piano |
| Village Scenes (Falún) (3) | 79 | 87b | | | 1926 (May) | 4/8 women choir and chamber orchestra |
| Piano Sonata | 80 | 88 | | | 1926 (June) | Piano |
| Out of Doors (Szabadban), Pieces (5) | 81 | 89 | | | 1926 (Summer) | Piano |
| Little Piano Pieces (9) | 82 | 90 | | | 1926 | Piano |
| Piano Concerto No. 1 | 83 | 91 | | | 1926 | Piano and orchestra |
| Rondos on Slovak Folk Tunes (3) | 84 | 92 | | | 1916, 1927 | Piano |
| String Quartet No. 3 | 85 | 93 | | | 1927 | String quartet |
| Rhapsody for Violin and Piano No. 1 | 86 | 94a | | | 1928 | Violin and piano |
| Rhapsody for Violin and Orchestra No. 1 | 87 | 94b | | | 1929 | Violin and orchestra |
| Rhapsody for Cello and Piano | 88 | 94 | | | 1929 | Cello and piano (transcription of Rhapsody for Violin and Piano No. 1) |
| Rhapsody for Violin and Piano No. 2 | 89 | 96a | | | 1928 rev 1935 or 1944 | Violin and piano |
| Rhapsody for Violin and Orchestra No. 2 | 90 | 96b | | | 1928, rev 1935 or 1944 | Violin and orchestra |
| String Quartet No. 4 | 91 | 95 | | | 1928 | String quartet |
| Hungarian Folksongs (5) (revision of BB 42) | 33 | 97 | | | 1928 | Voice and piano |
| Hungarian Folksongs (20) | 92 | 98 | | | 1929 | Voice and piano |
| Hungarian Folksongs for Mixed Chorus (4) | 93 | 99 | | | 1932 | Mixed chorus |
| Cantata Profana (9 Enchanted Stags) | 94 | 100 | | | 1930 | 2 Voices, double chorus and orchestra |
| Piano Concerto No. 2 | 95 | 101 | | | 1930/31 | Piano and orchestra |
| Sonatina for Violin and Piano (arr. of Sonatina Sz. 55, BB 69) | 55 | 102a | | | 1930 appr | Violin and piano (arr. André Gertler) |
| Transylvanian Dances (3) (orch. of Sonatina Sz. 55, BB 69) | 96 | 102b | | | 1931 | Orchestra |
| Hungarian Sketches (arr. parts BB 51,53,55,58) | 97 | 103 | | | 1931 | Orchestra |
| Duos for 2 Violins (44), Book 1-4 | 98 | 104 | | | 1931 | Two violins |
| Székely Songs for Male Chorus | 99 | 106 | | | 1932 (and 1938?) | Male chorus |
| Hungarian Peasant Songs (arr. BB 79/6–15) | 100 | 107 | | | 1933 | Orchestra |
| Hungarian Folksongs (5) (arr. parts BB 98) | 101 | 108 | | | 1933 | Solo voice and orchestra |
| Hungarian Dances | | | | | 1934 | Violin and piano |
| String Quartet No. 5 | 102 | 110 | | | 1934 | String quartet |
| Choruses with Orchestral Accompaniment (7) | 103 | 111 | | | 1935/36, w. orch 1937/41 | Children and women choir w. and w/o orchestra |
| From Olden Times | 104 | 112 | | | 1935 | Male chorus |
| Petite Suite (arr. BB 104) | 105 | 113 | | | 1936 | Piano |
| Music for Strings, Percussion and Celesta | 106 | 114 | | | 1936 | Percussion, celesta and string orchestra |
| Mikrokosmos | 107 | 105 | | | 1926 and 1932–39 | Piano |
| Pieces from Mikrokosmos (7) (BB 105) | 108 | 120 | | | 1939–1940 | Two pianos |
| Hungarian Folksong | 109 | 109 | | | 1934 c. | |
| Sonata for Two Pianos and Percussion | 110 | 115 | | | 1937 | Two pianos and percussion; orch 1940 as the Concerto for Two Pianos, Percussion and Orchestra |
| Contrasts (3) | 111 | 116 | | | 1938 | Violin, clarinet and piano |
| Violin Concerto No. 2 | 112 | 117 | | | 1937–38 | Violin and orchestra |
| Divertimento for Strings | 113 | 118 | | | 1939 | String orchestra |
| String Quartet No. 6 | 114 | 119 | | | 1939 | String quartet |
| Concerto for Two Pianos, Percussion and Orchestra | 115 | 121 | | | 1940 | Two pianos, percussion and orchestra; orch of the Sonata for Two Pianos and Percussion |
| Suite (arr. BB 40) | 115a | 122 | | 4b (list 3) | 1941 | Two pianos |
| Concerto for Orchestra | 116 | 123 | | | 1942–43, rev 1945 | Orchestra |
| Violin Solo Sonata | 117 | 124 | | | 1944 | Solo violin |
| 'A férj keserve' ("The Husband's Grief") | | 125 | | | 1945 | Voice and piano |
| Ukrainian Folksongs (3) | 118 | 126 | | | 1945 | Voice and piano |
| Piano Concerto No. 3 in E major | 119 | 127 | | | 1945 | Piano and orchestra |
| Viola Concerto (sketches only) | 120 | 128 | | | 1945 | Viola and orchestra (completed by Tibor Serly) |

== By type ==
This is a near complete list of compositions by Béla Bartók. Both the more common András Szőllősy catalogue numbering (Sz.) and the more recent László Somfai catalogue number (BB.) are provided. Where compositions do not have a Sz. numbering, the intermediate Denijs Dille catalogue numbering (DD.) has been provided. See the main article on Béla Bartók for more details.

This list does not include early compositions that have since been lost.

=== Stage ===
- Bluebeard's Castle (1911, revised 1912 & 1917) Op. 11, Sz. 48, BB 62, opera
- The Wooden Prince (1914–16) Op. 13, Sz. 60, BB 74, ballet
- The Miraculous Mandarin (1918, 1919 completed 1926) Op. 19, Sz. 73, BB 82, ballet-pantomime

=== Orchestral ===
- Scherzo in C major from Symphony in E♭ major DD 68, BB 25
- Suite #1 for full orchestra (1905) Op. 3, Sz. 31, BB 39
- Suite #2 for small orchestra (1905–1907 revised 1943) Op. 4, Sz. 34, BB 40
- Two Pictures (1910) Op. 10, Sz. 46, BB 59
- Romanian Dance Sz. 47a, BB 61
- Four Pieces (1912) Op. 12, Sz. 51, BB 64
- Suite The Wooden Prince Op. 13, Sz. 60, BB 74
- Romanian Folk Dances for small orchestra (1917) Sz. 68, BB 76
- Suite The Miraculous Mandarin Op. 19, Sz. 73, BB 82
- Kossuth, Symphonic Poem Sz. 75a, BB 31
- Dance Suite (Táncszvit) (1923) Sz. 77, BB 86
- Transylvanian Dances Sz. 96, BB 102b
- Hungarian Pictures (1931) Sz. 97, BB 103
- Hungarian Peasant Songs Sz. 100, BB 107
- Music for Strings, Percussion and Celesta (1936) Sz. 106, BB 114
- Divertimento (1939) Sz. 113, BB 118
- Concerto for Orchestra (1942–43, revised 1945) Sz. 116, BB 123

=== Concertante ===
- Piano
  - Rhapsody for Piano and Orchestra Op. 1, Sz. 27, BB 36b
  - Scherzo Burlesque for Piano and Orchestra Op. 2, Sz. 28, BB 35
  - Piano Concerto No. 1 (1926) Sz. 83, BB 91
  - Piano Concerto No. 2 (1930-31) Sz. 95, BB 101
  - Piano Concerto No. 3 (1945) Sz. 119, BB 127
- Violin
  - Violin Concerto No. 1 (1907–1908, 1st pub 1956) Op. posth., Sz. 36, BB 48a
  - Two Portraits for Violin and Orchestra (1907, 1908) Op. 5, Sz. 37, BB 48b
  - Rhapsody Folk Dances for Violin and Orchestra No. 1 (1928–29) Sz. 87, BB 94
  - Rhapsody Folk Dances for Violin and Orchestra No. 2 (1928, rev. 1935) Sz. 90, BB 96
  - Violin Concerto No. 2 (1937–38) Sz. 112, BB 117
- Viola
  - Viola Concerto (completed by Tibor Serly and also arr. for cello) (1945) Sz. 120, BB 128
- Other
  - Concerto for Two Pianos, Percussion and Orchestra (1940 arrangement of Sonata for Two Pianos and Percussion)

=== Choral ===
- With orchestral accompaniment
  - 3 Village Scenes Falun Sz. 79, BB 87b
  - 5 Hungarian Folksongs Sz. 101, BB 108
  - 7 Choruses with Orchestral Accompaniment, selected and arr. from Sz. 103, BB 111
  - Cantata Profana (The Nine Enchanted Stags) (1930) Sz. 94, BB 100
- Without orchestral accompaniment
  - 4 Old Hungarian folksongs Sz. 50, BB 60
  - 4 Slovak Folksongs Sz. 70, BB 78
  - 27 Two-part & Three-part Choruses Sz. 103, BB 111
  - Evening DD 74, BB 30
  - From Olden Times (3), BB 112 (1935)
  - Hungarian Folksongs Sz. 93, BB 99
  - 5 Slovak Folksongs Sz. 69, BB 77
  - Székely Songs Sz. 99, BB 106

=== Chamber ===
- 44 Duos for Two Violins Sz. 98, BB 104
- Andante in A major DD 70, BB 26
- Contrasts for clarinet, violin, and piano (1938) Sz. 111, BB 116
- Piano Quartet in C minor (1898) Op. 20, Sz. 9, BB 13, DD 52
- Piano Quintet (1903–04) DD 77, BB 33 (An earlier piano quintet, also in C major, composed in 1897, is lost.)
- Rhapsody No. 1 for violin and piano (1928) Sz. 86, BB 94
- Rhapsody No. 2 for violin and piano (1929) Sz. 89, BB 96
- Rhapsody for cello and piano Sz. 86, BB 94 (transcription by Bartók of Rhapsody for Violin and Piano No. 1)
- Sonata for Two Pianos and Percussion Sz. 110, BB 115
- Sonata in E minor for violin and piano DD 72, BB 28
- Sonata No. 1 for violin and piano (1921) Op. 21 Sz. 75, BB 84
- Sonata No. 2 for violin and piano (1922) Sz. 76, BB 85
- Seven Pieces from Mikrokosmos (for two pianos) Sz. 108, BB 120
- Sonata for Solo Violin Sz. 117, BB 124
- Suite Op. 4b (arranged for two pianos), Sz. 115a, BB 122
- String Quartets
  - String Quartet No. 1 Op. 7, Sz. 40, BB 52
  - String Quartet No. 2 Op. 17, Sz. 67, BB 75
  - String Quartet No. 3 Sz. 85, BB 93
  - String Quartet No. 4 Sz. 91, BB 95
  - String Quartet No. 5 Sz. 102, BB 110
  - String Quartet No. 6 Sz. 114, BB 119

=== Piano ===
- 2 Elegies Op. 8b, Sz. 41, BB 49
- Two Romanian Dances (1910) Op. 8a, Sz. 43, BB 56
- 3 Hungarian Folksongs from the Csík District Sz. 35a, BB 45/b
- 3 Burlesques Op. 8c, Sz. 47, BB 55
- 3 Hungarian Folk Tunes, Sz. 66, BB 80b
- 3 Studies Op. 18, Sz. 72, BB 81
- 3 Rondos on Slovak Folk Tunes Sz. 84, BB 92
- 4 Dirges, Op. 9a, Sz. 45, BB 58
- 4 Pieces DD 71, BB 27
- 7 Sketches Op. 9b, Sz. 44, BB 54
- 8 Improvisations on Hungarian Peasant Songs (1920) Op. 20, Sz. 74, BB 83
- 9 Little Piano Pieces Sz. 82, BB 90
- 10 Easy Pieces (1908) Sz. 39, BB 51
- 14 Bagatelles (1908) Op. 6, Sz. 38, BB 50
- 15 Hungarian Peasant Songs, Sz. 71, BB 79
- Allegro barbaro (1911) Sz. 49, BB 63
- Dance Suite, Sz. 77, BB 86b
- For Children Sz. 42, BB 53, [Books 1 & 2] Vol.1-4
- Marche funebre Sz. 75b, BB 31
- Mikrokosmos (1926, 1932–39) Sz. 107, BB 105
  - includes the 6 Dances in Bulgarian Rhythm dedicated to Harriet Cohen
- Out of Doors (1926) Sz. 81, BB 89
- Petite Suite Sz. 105, BB 113
- Petits Morceaux DD 67/1, BB 38
- Rhapsody, Op. 1, Sz. 26, BB 36a
- Romanian Folk Dances (1915) Sz. 56, BB 68
- Romanian Christmas Carols (1915) Sz. 57, BB 67
- Scherzo oder Fantasie Op. 18, DD 50, BB 11
- Slovakian Dance (1923)
- Sonata (1926) Sz. 80, BB 88
- Sonatina (1915) Sz. 55, BB 69
- Suite, Op. 14, (1916) Sz. 62, BB 70
- The First Term at the Piano Sz. 52-53, BB 67

There are also piano works that are from Bartók's first and second set of opus numbers. Some are lost, some have been published and are listed above, and some are not and are unpublished.

=== Songs ===
- 2 Hungarian Folksongs Sz. 33b, BB 44
- 4 Slovakian Folksongs Sz. 35b, BB 46
- 4 Songs included in Mikrokosmos Sz. 107, BB 105
- 5 Songs on poems by Endre Ady Op. 16, Sz. 63, BB 72
- 5 Songs on poems by Klára Gombossy and Wanda Gleiman Op. 15, Sz. 61, BB 71 (original with piano accompaniment, later also arranged by Zoltán Kodály for orchestral accompaniment)
- Eight Hungarian Folksongs Sz. 64, BB 47
- Twenty Hungarian Folksongs Sz. 92, BB 98
- Székely Folksong Piros Alma... Sz. 30, BB 34
- From Gyergyó Sz. 35, BB 45a
- Hungarian Folksong Sz. 109, BB deest
- Hungarian Folksongs #1–10 Sz. 33, BB 42 (revised in 1928 as Five Hungarian Folksongs, Sz. 33, BB 97)
- Hungarian Folksongs #11–20 Sz. 33a, BB 43
- Village Scenes Falun Sz. 78, BB 87a

=== Arrangements by others ===
- Suite paysanne hongroise (arranged by Paul Arma, for a flute and piano or orchestra)
- Rumanian Folk Dances (arranged by Frederick Charlton for The Hutchins Consort)
- Allegro barbaro arranged by Jenő Kenessey for orchestra (1946)
- Sonata for Synthesizer (Piano Sonata arranged by b schmidt for electronic music synthesizers)
- Omni Suite (Suite for Piano arranged by b Schmidt for electronic music synthesizers)

== See also ==
- List of string quartets by Béla Bartók
