= Hungarian Pictures =

1931 suite for orchestra by Béla Bartók

Hungarian Pictures (or Hungarian Sketches)
- by Béla Bartók
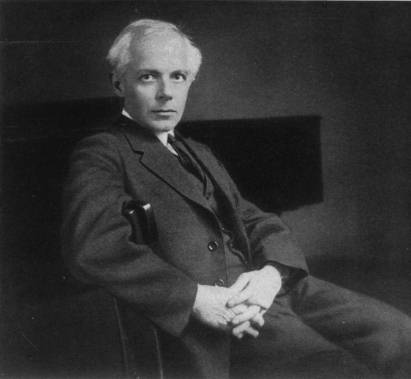
- Béla Bartók in 1927
- Native name: Magyar képek
- Catalogue: Sz. 97, BB 103
- Composed: 1931
- Performed: 22 January 1932: Budapest; 26 November 1934: Budapest
- Published: 1984 - Budapest
- Movements: 5
- Scoring: Orchestra

Hungarian Pictures, sometimes also referred to as Hungarian Sketches, Sz. 97, BB 103 (Hungarian: Magyar képek) is a suite for orchestra by Hungarian composer Béla Bartók finished in 1931. The suite consists of orchestrations of earlier short pieces for piano composed between 1908 and 1911.

== Composition ==
The original piano pieces were created during Bartók's journey around Romania and Hungary when he started collecting and arranging folk music that further transformed his somewhat Lisztian early style into the style he came to develop. Therefore, many of the compositions from this period were either based on folk music or created from scratch with a reasonable resemblance to folk music. However, neither money nor widespread fame would be plentiful in his lifetime, as he had to struggle with moderate opposition in his country to his modern style and some of his major works, such as The Miraculous Mandarin, being banned for years.

From the 1930s onwards, Bartók started arranging some of his piano music for orchestral concert performances with the expressed intent of making money out of it. This was the case of his Transylvanian Dances, arranged from his Sonatina, and this set, which takes five pieces from works created two decades earlier.

The set was completed in August 1931 in Mondsee. Pieces 1, 2, 3 and 5 were premiered in Budapest by the Budapest Concert Orchestra under Massimo Freccia on January 24, 1932. The first complete performance of the whole suite took place two years later, on November 26, 1934, with Heinrich Laber conducting the Philharmonic Society Orchestra. It was eventually published by Editio Musica Budapest in 1983 and arranged for wind quintet by Christopher Sears in 1985.

== Music ==
The suite consists of five movements and has a duration of 12 minutes. The movement list is as follows:

1. An Evening in the Village (from Ten Easy Pieces, No. 5)
2. Bear Dance (from Ten Easy Pieces, No. 10)
3. Melody (from Four Dirges, No. 2)
4. Slightly Tipsy (from Three Burlesques, No. 2)
5. Swineherd's Dance (from For Children, No. 40)

Even though all of the pieces sound like folk melodies, only the last one in the set uses genuine folk material. The suite follows a common practice by Bartók: using a slow central movement surrounded by two scherzos.

The score calls for the following instruments: two flutes, piccolo, two oboes, two clarinets and bass clarinet, two bassoons, two horns, two trumpets, two trombones, tuba, timpani, percussion (xylophone, triangle, side drum, snare drum, cymbals, and bass drum), harp, and a string section.
