= Romanian Folk Dances =

Béla Bartók suite of six piano pieces (1915)

Romanian Folk Dances (Romanian: Dansuri populare românești, pronounced [ˈdansurʲ popuˈlare romɨˈneʃtʲ]), (Hungarian: Román népi táncok, pronounced [ˈromaːn ˈneːpi ˈtaːnt͡sok]), Sz. 56, BB 68 is a suite of six short piano pieces composed by Béla Bartók in 1915. He later orchestrated it for small ensemble in 1917 as Sz. 68, BB 76.

It is based on seven Romanian tunes from Transylvania, originally played on fiddle or shepherd's flute. Its title was originally Romanian Folk Dances from Hungary (Hungarian: Magyarországi román népi táncok, pronounced [ˈmɒɟɒrorsaːɡi ˈromaːn ˈneːpi ˈtaːnt͡sok]) but was later changed by Bartók when Transylvania became part of Romania in 1920. It is nowadays available in the 1971 edition which is written with key signatures although Bartók rarely used key signatures.

== Structure ==
This set of dances consists of six movements and, according to the composer, it should take four minutes and three seconds to perform, but most professional pianists take up to five minutes. The list of the movements is as follows (with the original Hungarian title listed first, the most commonly known Romanian title second, and the English translation in parentheses):

Second, fifth, and sixth Romanian Folk Dances
Performed by the Advent Chamber Orchestra

1. Bot tánc / Jocul cu bâtă (Stick Dance)
  The melody of the first movement, according to Bartók, came from the Mezőszabad (present-day Voiniceni) village that was part of Mezőcsávás (present-day Ceuașu de Câmpie) commune which was located in the Maros-Torda administrative county within Transylvania, and he first heard it when two gypsy violinists were playing it.
2. Brâul (Sash Dance)
  The second movement is a typical dance from Romania called Brâul, for which traditionally a sash or a waistband was used. This melody came from Egres (present-day Igriș), in the Banat region.
3. Topogó / Pe loc (In One Spot)
  The third dance comes also from Egres (Igriș), but its theme is much darker and its melody recreates Middle Eastern instruments, such as the flute.
4. Bucsumí tánc / Buciumeana (Dance from Bucsum)
  The fourth dance came from Bucsony, Alsó-Fehér County (today Bucium, Alba county in Romania).
5. Román polka / Poarga Românească (Romanian Polka)
  The fifth dance is an old Romanian dance similar to the Polka and comes from Belényes (present-day Beiuş, in Bihor county), near the border between Hungary and Romania.
6. Aprózó / Mărunțel (Fast Dance)
  The sixth and last dance is formed by two different melodies: the first from Belényes (present-day Beiuș) and the second from the village of Nyagra (present-day Neagra) within the Palotailva (present-day Lunca Bradului) commune. In both the orchestral version and the original piano version, the final two dances are performed attacca—without a break between movements.

== Analysis ==
Movement	Tempo	Time to perform	Key	Form	Mode
Bot tánc / Jocul cu bâtă	Allegro moderato = 104	57 seconds	A minor	Binary	Dorian and Aeolian on key centre A
Brâul	Allegro = 144	25 seconds	D minor	Binary	Dorian centered on D
Topogó / Pe loc	Andante = 90	45 seconds	B minor	Binary	'Romanian minor' scale on key centre B
Bucsumí tánc / Buciumeana	Moderato, = 100	35 seconds	A major	Binary with 2 tunes	Phrygian dominant scale on key centre A
Román polka / Poarga Românească	Allegro, = 152	31 seconds	D major	Binary with 2 tunes	Lydian on key centre D
Aprózó / Mărunțel	Allegro, = 152, after Più Allegro = 160	13 and 36 seconds	D Major, modulates to A major	3 tunes and coda	Key Centre A; first part begins with Lydian, but is in Mixolydian; second part is in Dorian

== Arrangements ==
Aside from the version Bartók wrote for a small orchestral ensemble, some of Bartók's friends wrote adaptations or transcriptions of this piece for several different ensembles. The following are the best-known:

- Arthur Willner's version for string orchestra. It is a mere transcription with no modification of the original music.
- Zoltán Székely's version for violin and piano. This is not just a transcription, but also an arrangement and adaptation of the piece for these two instruments. Some of the modifications Székely made included transposing some of the movements (the second movement was transposed from D minor to F♯ minor, the third from B minor to D minor and the fourth from A major to C major), repeating some sections, adding bars, and using several techniques for the violin such as artificial harmonics, double stops, and Sautillé.

== Notable recordings ==
Notable recordings of this composition include the following:

Piano Solo	Record Company	Year of Recording	Format
András Schiff	Denon Records / Brilliant Classics	1980	CD
Jenő Jandó	Naxos Records	2005	CD

Notable recordings of the arrangement by Zoltán Székely include the following:

Violin	Piano	Record Company	Year of Recording	Format
Joseph Szigeti	Béla Bartók	EMI Classics	1930	CD

== See also ==
- Two Romanian Folk Dances
- Culture of Romania
- Béla Bartók
- List of compositions by Béla Bartók
- Transylvania
