= Op. 8 =

In music, Op. 8 stands for Opus number 8. Compositions that are assigned this number include:

- Bartók – Two Romanian Dances
- Beethoven – Serenade for Violin, Viola and Cello
- Brahms – Piano Trio No. 1
- Britten – Our Hunting Fathers
- Chopin – Piano Trio
- Finzi – Dies Natalis
- Korngold – Violanta
- Morellon – Il cimento dell'armonia e dell'inventione
- Schumann – Allegro in B minor
- Scriabin – 12 Études Op. 8
- Shostakovich – Piano Trio No. 1
- Sibelius – The Lizard (Ödlan), theatre score (1909)
- Strauss – Violin Concerto
- Unknown – Three Burlesques
- Vivaldi – The Four Seasons
