= Two Romanian Dances =

1910 compositions by Béla Bartók

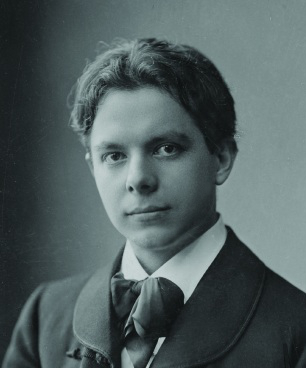
Béla Bartók in 1903

Two Romanian Dances (Hungarian: 'Két román tánc'), Op. 8a, Sz. 43, BB 56, is a set of piano compositions by Béla Bartók, based on Romanian traditional music. Written in 1910, they date from the beginning of his interest in folk music – his first work showing strong folk influence, the String Quartet No. 1, is from just two years before. However, the Dances show that he has already seamlessly incorporated folk idioms into his musical language.

Leó Weiner orchestrated the "Two Dances" in 1939.

== Romanian Dance No. 1, Op. 8a, No. 1 ==
Two Romanian Dances
MIDI capture from piano performance (9:43)

The first dance (Allegro vivace) is rhapsodic in form, though with a recurrent main theme. This theme, which provides the melodic, textural, and rhythmic foundations of the work, is first heard pianissimo in the murky depths of the keyboard. The middle section, Lento, presents an evocative modal melody against a various tremolo harmonies in the bass. This section fades away, and, after a long and increasingly frenzied crescendo, the main theme returns in triumphant fortissimo octaves. Unusually for Bartók, major and minor chords are used extensively in this piece.

== Romanian Dance No. 2, Op. 8a, No. 2 ==
The second dance (Poco allegro) begins with a brief introductory passage, which sets the mood of the piece – a strange mix of humour and severity. The main theme, based loosely on a Romanian jeering song, is presented three times in succession. After a violent transition, the material from the opening returns, though somewhat warped. The main theme returns, yet more frantic; after another brief interlude, it returns again, this time marked Più mosso, febrile (“more motion, feverishly”). The remainder of the piece is a mishmash of cheerful motifs showing Balinese influence, sudden contrasts which range from amusing to disconcerting, and majestic passages in double octaves. Although the form of this dance defies classification, it is nonetheless remarkably directed, unified, and satisfying.

== See also ==
- Romanian Folk Dances, suite of six short piano pieces by Bartók (1915)
