= 15 Songs =

Fifteen Songs or 15 Songs may refer to:

- Rachmaninoff: 15 Songs, Op.26
- Fifteen Hungarian Peasant Songs, a composition by Béla Bartók.
