= Rhapsody No. 2 (Bartók) =

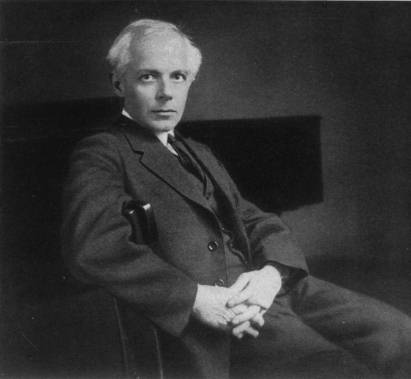
Béla Bartók in 1927

Rhapsody No. 2, Sz. 89 and 90, BB 96, is the second of two virtuoso works for violin and piano, subsequently arranged with orchestra accompaniment, written by Béla Bartók. It was composed in 1928 and orchestrated in 1929. The orchestral version was revised in 1935, and the version with piano in 1945. It is dedicated to Hungarian violinist Zoltán Székely, who later became the first violinist of the Hungarian String Quartet in 1937, two years after the founding of the ensemble.

Bartók evidently composed both rhapsodies purely as a personal gesture, rather than on commission, and did so without telling anyone until they were both completed (Walsh 2005, 235). According to Székely, he and the composer met one day in 1928 and, after chatting for a time, Bartók suddenly announced that he had a surprise for him, and produced the manuscripts of the two rhapsodies, which no one else had previously seen. "One is for you; one is for Szigeti," Bartók told him. “You may choose which one you like for the dedication.” Székely chose the Second Rhapsody (Kenneson 1994, 113).

Both of the rhapsodies exemplify a mode of composition using peasant-music sources, described by Bartók as taking an existing melody and adding an accompaniment together with some introductory or ending material, in such a way that the newly composed matter is strictly secondary—never competing with the folk material for prominence (Walsh 2005, 235–36).

The Rhapsody uses the same slow–fast (lassú—friss) paired movements of the popular Hungarian verbunkos (recruiting dance) found in the earlier Rhapsody for Piano of 1904, and to which he would return in the first movement of Contrasts in 1938 (Losseff 2001, 124). The title, 'Rhapsody', is a reference to the dramatic contrasts between the movements. Bartók specified that each of the movements can be performed separately—not only the fast second movement but also the more serious slow opening movement (Walsh 2005, 235).

== Analysis ==
The opening lassú section presents three themes arranged in a rondo or five-part song form: ABACA. Although mainly in D minor, the opening section emphasizes the fifth scale degree so strongly as to suggest a sort of Phrygian mode on A, and the movement closes with a cadence on A, and the instruction Fermata breve, poi attacca (pause briefly, then connect to the next movement). As in the First Rhapsody, the following friss movement is an informal chain form, here consisting of seven folk themes—six Transylvanian Gypsy fiddle dances and one Ruthenian dance (the fifth tune, Uvevanẙi) from Szeklence in Máramaros County (Lampert 1981, 117–23). These seven dances are arranged into thirteen sections in various quick tempos, producing the impression of perpetual exposition. The movement begins in G, but is primarily anchored in D (with prominent use of the closely related acoustic and Lydian scales), and concludes in that key. Bartók appears to have been dissatisfied with the original ending, as published in 1929, and made as many as seven tentative alternatives, finally publishing one of them as definitive (Laki 2001, 141; Walsh 2005, 244–53, 256).

Other features of the piece include open-interval harmonies, drones, fiery rhythms and folk melodies.

== Sources ==
- Kenneson, Claude. 1994. Székely and Bartók: The Story of a Friendship. Portland, OR: Amadeus Press. ISBN 0-931340-70-5.
- Laki, Peter. 2001. "Works for Solo Violin and the Viola Concerto". In The Cambridge Companion to Bartók, edited by Amanda Bayley, 133–50. Cambridge Companions to Music. Cambridge and New York: Cambridge University Press. ISBN 0-521-66010-6 (cloth); ISBN 0-521-66958-8 (pbk).
- Lampert, Vera. 1981. "Quellenkatalog der Volksliedbearbeitungen von Bartók. Ungarische, slowakische, rumänische, ruthenische, serbische und arabische Volkslieder und Tänze". In Documenta Bartókiana 6, edited by Lászlo Somfai, 15–49. Mainz: B. Schott’s Söhne. ISBN 3-7957-2071-0.
- Losseff, Nicky. 2001. "The Piano Concertos and Sonata for Two Pianos and Percussion". In The Cambridge Companion to Bartók, edited by Amanda Bayley, 118–32. Cambridge Companions to Music. Cambridge and New York: Cambridge University Press. ISBN 0-521-66010-6 (cloth); ISBN 0-521-66958-8 (pbk).
- Rodda, Richard. 2005. "Rhapsody No. 2 (1928): About the Composition", program note for a recital by Robert McDuffie (violin) and Christopher Taylor (piano), 10 November. The Kennedy Center website (Accessed 6 March 2012).
- Walsh, Fiona. 2005. "Variant Endings for Bartók’s Two Violin Rhapsodies (1928–29)". Music & Letters 86, no. 2:234–56. doi:10.1083/ml/gci034
