= Five Songs, Op. 15 (Bartók) =

Song cycle by Béla Bartók

Five Songs
- by Béla Bartók
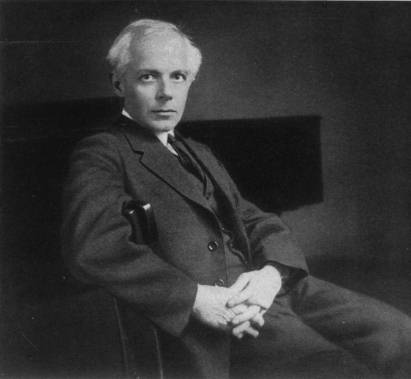
- Béla Bartók in 1927
- Native name: Öt dal
- Catalogue: Sz. 61; BB 71
- Opus: 15 (Set III)
- Composed: 1916 (rev. Peter Bartók 1991)
- Published: 1918:
- Scoring: Voice and piano

Five Songs, Op. 15, Sz. 61, BB 71 (German: Fünf Lieder, Hungarian: Öt dal) is an early song cycle for voice and piano written in 1916 by Hungarian composer Béla Bartók.

== Background ==
Bartók, who later became very well known for collecting folk music from central and eastern Europe, wrote this set of songs after returning to Budapest with a large selection of Slovak folk music early in the month of January 1916. He composed an arrangement of Krutí Tono Vretena during the second week of that month and began composing this cycle of original songs. He composed the first song, Az én szerelmem, on January 15 (according to Bartók's own correspondence); the second, Színes álomban, was composed on January 28; the fourth, Nyár, on February 5; and the fifth, Itt lent a völgyben, on February 6. These were the first songs to be composed after Bártok left the Franz Liszt Academy of Music. He composed a new set of songs, later entitled Five Songs, Op. 16, to texts by Endre Ady, before completing what would later become the third movement, A vágyak éjjele, which was composed separately from a text by Wanda Gleiman and added subsequently.

Bartók did not initially conceive the set of five songs as a whole, but rather chose to plan the premiere of the four songs together with the Slovak song composed in early January on March 12, 1916, upon request by the magazine Nyugat. However, the singer with whom Bartók chose to premiere the set, mezzo-soprano Ilona Durigó, was unavailable at the time, as she was touring around the Netherlands. They were again set to be premiered in a concert in Vienna at the end of the year, which was cancelled again and caused Bartók to lay this set aside for two years.

It was only on June 25, 1918, when Emil Hertzka, the then-director of Universal Edition, asked Bartók for pieces that would be ready for publication. His Suite, Op. 14, Allegro Barbaro, and the current set of four songs were selected by Bartók. However, they were published as Three Songs, Op. 15, a set that contained Az én szerelmem, Nyár, and A vágyak éjjele. Bartók gave no explanation as to why he decided to drop the missing songs, but they were dated "Rákoskeresztúr, August 27, 1916". Bartók only mentioned these songs again in a letter to Hertzka on January 14, 1923, in which he stated that he didn't wish the set to be published again, as the texts were "mediocre" and the composer didn't have the authorization from the writer, Klára Gombossy, a young girl Bartók became infatuated with at the time of the composition, to publish them.

This set of five songs was eventually copyrighted by Universal Edition in 1961 and, after being revised by Bartók's son Peter Bartók with the help of Eve Beglarian, Nelson Dellamaggiore and Denijs Dille, republished in its form most commonly performed today in 1991. Together with Op. 16, this set constitutes the only instance in which Bartók composed songs from scratch without any folk material.

== Structure ==
This cycle consists of five songs and has an approximate total duration of 15 minutes. The texts were translated into English by Erik Smith and German by Ernst Hartmann. Following is a description of the songs in this collection:

	Title (Hungarian)	Title (English)	Incipit	Tempo marking	Bars
1	Az én szerelmem	My Love	"Az én szerelmem nem sápadt éji hold"	Parlando	42
2	Nyár	Summer	"Szomjasan vágyva várom a szellőt"	Andante	35
3	A vágyak éjjele	Night of Desire	"Ez most a vágyak éjjele"	Andante sostenuto	89
4	Színes álomban	In Vivid Dreams	"Színes álomban láttalak már"	Molto sostenuto	48
5	Itt lent a völgyben	In the Valley	"Itt lent a völgyben már gyilkol az ősz"	Sostenuto	38

== Arrangements ==
Hungarian composer Zoltán Kodály wrote an arrangement of the full set of songs for voice and orchestra. It was written around the early 60s, following the growing trend for songs for voice and orchestra. Antal Dorati premiered it in Amsterdam with mezzo-soprano Helga Pilarczyk on July 28, 1962.

== Recordings ==
- Mezzo-soprano Klára Csordás and pianist Adrienne Krausz recorded this piece at the Festetics Palace, in June 1994. The recording was released on CD by Pyramid Records.
