= Rhapsody No. 1 (Bartók) =

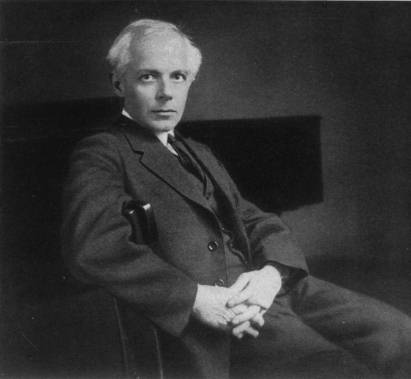
Béla Bartók in 1927

Rhapsody No. 1, Sz. 86, 87, and 88, BB 94 is the first of two virtuoso works for violin and piano, written by Béla Bartók in 1928 and subsequently arranged in 1929 for violin and orchestra, as well as for cello and piano. It is dedicated to Hungarian virtuoso violinist Joseph Szigeti, a close friend of Bartók, who gave the first performance of the orchestra version in Königsberg on 1 November 1929, with Hermann Scherchen conducting the orchestra.

Bartók evidently composed both rhapsodies purely as a personal gesture, rather than on commission, and did so without telling anyone until they were both completed. According to the violinist Zoltán Székely, he and the composer met one day in 1928 and, after chatting for a time, Bartók suddenly announced that he had a surprise for him, and produced the manuscripts of the two rhapsodies, which no one else had previously seen. "One is for you; one is for Szigeti," Bartók told him. "You may choose which one you like for the dedication." Székely chose the Second Rhapsody, but quickly added, "that doesn't mean that the First Rhapsody was already dedicated to Szigeti!".

Both rhapsodies exemplify a mode of composition using peasant-music sources, described by Bartók as taking an existing melody and adding an accompaniment together with some introductory or ending material, in such a way that the newly composed matter is strictly secondary—never competing with the folk material for prominence. This was acknowledged in the scores of the early editions, which bore the subtitle "Folk Dances". Bartók's objective was to transplant the entire style of Eastern-European fiddle playing into the Western concert context. In order to further this project, he insisted that Szigeti listen to the original field recordings from which the melodies were transcribed. The Rhapsody uses the same slow–fast (lassú—friss) paired movements of the popular Hungarian verbunkos (recruiting dance) found in the earlier Rhapsody for Piano of 1904, and to which he would later return in the first movement of Contrasts in 1938. Bartók specified that each of the movements can be performed separately—not only the fast second movement but also the more serious slow opening movement of each rhapsody.

== Analysis ==
The first movement is in ternary form (ABA′, plus a coda), the main theme of which begins with a rising-scale violin melody heavily laden with Romani influences, including the characteristic dotted rhythms. This is a Romanian fiddle tune from Mureș County, Transylvania (Lampert 1981, 113). It is in the Lydian mode, first occurring on G, with a drone-like accompaniment in the piano part. When it returns in the third section, it is transposed to C. The contrasting, middle section of the movement is a mournful one, characterized by short-long figurations. This is the only Hungarian melody used in either of the two rhapsodies, a Transylvanian fiddle tune called the Lament of Árvátfalva recorded by Béla Vikár and later transcribed by Bartók. The coda briefly returns to a fragment of this lament, ending with the marking Fermata breve; poi attacca ("pause briefly, then connect to the next movement").

The second movement is in "chain form", featuring a succession of five independent melodies with "no attempt whatever to create structure or integration"—apart from an overall accelerando. It possesses an air of brilliance, exhibiting the most virtuosic and vibrant dance melodies. In the published score, Bartók provided two alternative endings. The first, longer version brings back the main theme from the first movement, in the original G Lydian tonality, and finishes with a ten-bar, cadenza-like flourish. The second, shorter ending does not recall material from the lassú, but instead is based on the E major first theme of the second movement, now transposed to A major. When the second movement is played on its own, this shorter ending is obligatory.

== Sources ==
- Kenneson, Claude. 1994. Székely and Bartók: The Story of a Friendship. Portland, OR: Amadeus Press. ISBN 0-931340-70-5.
- Laki, Peter. 2001. "Works for Solo Violin and the Viola Concerto". In The Cambridge Companion to Bartók, edited by Amanda Bayley, 133–50. Cambridge Companions to Music. Cambridge and New York: Cambridge University Press. ISBN 0-521-66010-6 (cloth); ISBN 0-521-66958-8 (pbk).
- Lampert, Vera. 1981. "Quellenkatalog der Volksliedbearbeitungen von Bartók. Ungarische, slowakische, rumänische, ruthenische, serbische und arabische Volkslieder und Tänze". In Documenta Bartókiana 6, edited by Lászlo Somfai, 15–149. Mainz: B. Schott's Söhne. ISBN 3-7957-2071-0.
- Losseff, Nicky. 2001. "The Piano Concertos and Sonata for Two Pianos and Percussion". In The Cambridge Companion to Bartók, edited by Amanda Bayley, 118–32. Cambridge Companions to Music. Cambridge and New York: Cambridge University Press. ISBN 0-521-66010-6 (cloth); ISBN 0-521-66958-8 (pbk).
- Rodda, Richard. 2005. "Rhapsody No. 1: About the Composition", program note for a recital by Robert McDuffie (violin) and Christopher Taylor, (piano) 10 November. The Kennedy Center website (accessed 6 March 2012).
- Walsh, Fiona. 2005. "Variant Endings for Bartók's Two Violin Rhapsodies (1928–29)". Music & Letters 86, no. 2:234–56. doi:10.1083/ml/gci034
