= Nine Little Piano Pieces =

- by Béla Bartók
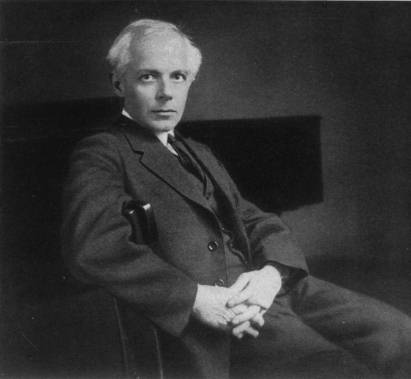
- Béla Bartók in 1927
- Native name: Kilenc kis zongoradarab
- Catalogue: Sz. 82; BB 90
- Composed: 1926 – 1926:
- Movements: 9
- Scoring: Piano

Nine Little Piano Pieces, Sz. 82, BB 90 (Hungarian: Kilenc kis zongoradarab) is a collection of short pieces for piano by Hungarian composer Béla Bartók. It was completed in 1926.

== Composition ==
A composer devoted to education, Bartók wrote many easy short pieces during his lifetime. However, in the 1920s he had also earned a high reputation as a concert pianist and performer, which made him tour frequently, especially while he was in Europe. 1925 was a year that was specifically productive in terms of public performance; however, that implied that he wouldn't be active again until the end of May, 1926, after his tours and most of his sporadic concert activity came to a pause. Bartók finished a fairly decently long list of compositions during the second half of 1926: the Piano Sonata, which was finished in June; Out of Doors, which was completed between June and August; and one of his most important pieces for the piano – the First Piano Concerto, which he began composing in August and finished on November 12. Along with these pieces, he also completed this set of Nine Little Piano Pieces, a compilation of short pieces that were released in three volumes and had a primarily educational purpose.

Bartók finished the whole set consisting in three volumes on October 31, 1926. A partial premiere of Nine Little Piano Pieces took place on December 8, 1926, in a recital that Bartók himself gave at the Academy of Music in Budapest, where he also premiered his piano sonata and Out of Doors. On that occasion, Bartók only played seven short movements from the collection.

== Structure ==
This 15-minute set of nine pieces is divided into three volumes that were initially sold separately and constituted Bartók's scrapbook at the time of its publication. The first volume was a collection of contrapuntal studies; the second, a set of character pieces; and the third consisted of just one movement, which was meant to be a concert piece for young performers.

The movement list is as follows:

Volume I (Four Dialogues)
1. Moderato
2. Andante
3. Lento
4. Allegro vivace
Volume II
5. Menuetto. Moderato
6. Air. Allegro — Meno mosso
7. Marcia delle bestie. Comodo
8. Tambourine. Allegro molto
Volume III
9. Preludio — All'ungherese. (Note: The title is misspelled in the version published by Boosey & Hawkes as All Ungherese) Molto moderato

== Publication ==
The score was initially published by Universal Edition in 1927. (Note: UE 10000) However, Boosey & Hawkes is the copyright holder only in the United States since 1954. The whole set was revised by Béla Bartók's son, Peter Bartók, and republished in 1995, along with a series of works for piano. Peter's revision was just a correction of minor details after the examination of the original manuscript sources.

== Notable recordings ==
Following are some of the most well-known recordings of this piece:

Piano	Record company	Year of recording	Format
Jenő Jandó	Naxos Records	2012	CD
