= Twenty Hungarian Folksongs =

Song cycle by Béla Bartók

- by Béla Bartók
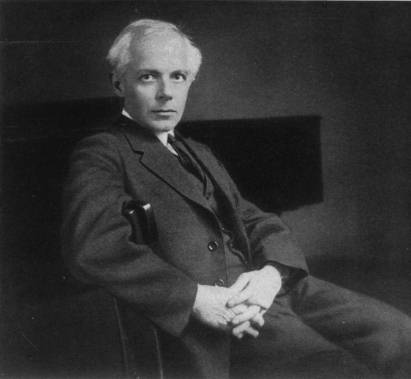
- Béla Bartók in 1927
- Native name: Húsz magyar népdal
- Catalogue: Sz. 92; BB 98
- Period: Contemporary music
- Form: Song cycle
- Language: Hungarian, German
- Composed: 1929
- Published: 1932
- Publisher: Universal Edition; Hawkes & Son
- Duration: 35 minutes
- Movements: 16
- Scoring: Voice and piano

Twenty Hungarian Folksongs (Hungarian: Húsz magyar népdal), Sz. 92, BB 98, is the last cycle of folksongs for voice and piano by Hungarian composer Béla Bartók.

== Background ==
This set of folksongs was finished in 1929, after several years of collecting and arranging folksongs, most of which were published in a book published in 1924 entitled A magyar népdal (The Hungarian Folk Song). This included most of the raw material that he worked on in many other different pieces that were also based on folk material. This was Bartók's last set of songs based on folk tunes and was put together in a seemingly random fashion, as they were grouped loosely into different categories, but not according to the date of composition of the individual pieces. However, he wrote the last five songs of the set in an uninterrupted movement.

The cycle was first performed by Maria Basilides, who also premiered the arrangement for orchestra, and Bartók at the piano, on January 30, 1930, in Budapest. It was published by Universal Edition in 1932 and again by Hawkes & Son in 1939.

== Structure ==
This song cycle is divided into four books of unequal length, containing a total of sixteen movements, and takes more than half an hour to perform. It is scored for unspecified voice (commonly performed by a soprano or a mezzo-soprano) and piano. Bartók wrote the duration and metronome indications for each song, which was common in some of Bartók's works. According to Bartók himself, these were not meant to be taken exactly as written, but they are meant to serve "only as a guide for the executants". The movement list is as follows:

Book I: Szomorú nóták (Sad Songs)

1. A tömlöcben (In Prison). Lento, parlando
2. Régi keserves (Old Lament). Non troppo lento, parlando
3. Bujdosó ének (The Fugitive). Andante, parlando
4. Pásztornóta (Herdsman’s Song). Andante, parlando

Book II: Táncdalok (Dancing Songs)

5. Székely „lassú” (Székely Slow Dance). Maestoso
6. Székely „friss” (Székely Fast Dance). Allegro
7. Kanásztánc (Swineherd’s Dance). Allegro
8. „Hatforintos” nóta (Six-Florin Dance). Allegro

Book III: Vegyes dalok (Diverse Songs)

9. Juhászcsúfoló (The Shepherd). Andante
10. Tréfás nóta (Joking Song). Allegro
11. Párosító (1) (Nuptial Serenade 1). Moderato, scherzando
12. Párosító (2) (Nuptial Serenade 2). Allegro
13. Pár-ének (Dialogue Song). Adagio non troppo
14. Panasz (Lament). Andante
15. Bordal (Drinking Song). Non troppo vivo

Book IV: Új dalok (New Style Songs)

  1. Allegro ("Hej, édesanyám")
  2. Più allegro ("Érik a ropogós cseresznye")
  3. Moderato ("Már Dobozon régen leesett a hó")
  4. Allegretto ("Sárga kukoricaszár")
  5. Allegro non troppo ("Búza, búza, búza")

The last book from this set has only one untitled movement, which, in turn, contains five different songs joined attacca, thus turning it into a continuous musical texture with connecting piano passages. According to professor Michael Hicks, Bartók did not merely arrange folk music, but he rather re-composed the pieces and used repetitions, transpositions, texture economy and narrative building, which helped him "reach his ideal of making high art from the folksong of his homeland".

The lyrics were written in Bartók's native Hungarian. However, they were translated into German for their latest edition. Book I was translated by Benedikt Szabolcsi and Books II to IV by Rudolf Stefan Hoffmann.

== Arrangements ==
Bartók himself also published an arrangement for voice and orchestra of songs 1, 2, 11, 14, and 12. It was entitled Five Hungarian Folksongs, Sz. 101, BB 108, and was published some years later, in 1933, to celebrate the 80th anniversary of the Budapest Philharmonic Orchestra.

== See also ==
- Hungarian folksongs for voice and piano (Bartók)
