= Three Burlesques =

Composition for piano by Béla Bartók

- by Béla Bartók
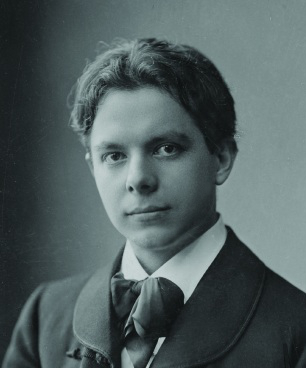
- Béla Bartók in 1903
- Native name: Három burleszk
- Catalogue: Sz. 47; BB 55
- Opus: 8c
- Composed: 1908-1911
- Published: 1912 - Budapest
- Movements: 3
- Scoring: Piano

Three Burlesques, Op. 8c, Sz. 47, BB 55 (Hungarian: Három burleszk) is a set of burlesques for piano by Hungarian composer Béla Bartók. It was composed between 1908 and 1911.

== Composition ==
After Bartók's long-lasting depression following his participation in the Rubinstein Competition in Paris in 1906, he decided to embark on a great journey around rural Romania and Hungary, where he found great inspiration from peasant songs. During this journey, he wrote hundreds of pieces, some of which were published during this period. Many compositions from this period were either largely based on peasant and folk music or made from scratch trying to resemble folk music, as can be seen in other sets such as Three Hungarian Folktunes, Four Dirges, Ten Easy Pieces, and Fourteen Bagatelles.

The composition of this set spanned this entire period. The first burlesque was composed in 1908; the third, in 1910; and the second, in 1911. It was published by Rózsavölgyi soon after its completion, in 1912, and was republished by Boosey & Hawkes in 1950. Bartók is known to have become particularly fond of this set. He decided to perform the second burlesque for recording on November 10, 1929, and later used this same burlesque in an orchestral set of arrangements of old peasant tunes entitled Hungarian Sketches. He asked again to perform the whole set for recording in 1944, when he was in New York but, unfortunately, this would never come true.

== Structure ==
The set consists of three pieces. It has an overall approximate duration of 7 minutes. The movement list is as follows:

1. Quarrel. Presto
2. A little tipsy. Allegretto
3. Molto vivo, capriccioso

The term burlesque, used as the title for the pieces in this set, is meant to mean short, lively pieces used as pantomimes, since the term was originally used in literature and theater. Here, social conventions and customs are meant to be exaggerated and parodied, That is, scenes that reflect human vicissitudes, both pleasant and unpleasant. Therefore, the harmonies in this piece are very dissonant and the rhythmic patterns are also jokingly lively.
