= Five Hungarian Folksongs (Bartók) =

Collection of songs by Béla Bartók

- by Béla Bartók
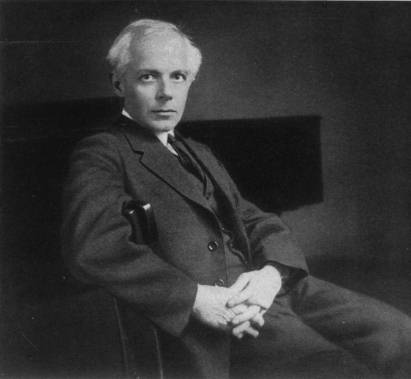
- Béla Bartók in 1927
- Native name: Öt magyar népdal enekhangra zongorakísérettel
- Catalogue: Sz. 33; BB 97
- Composed: circa 1928
- Performed: 1928
- Published: 1970: Budapest
- Scoring: Voice and piano

Five Hungarian Folksongs, Sz. 33, BB 97 (Hungarian: Öt magyar népdal enekhangra zongorakísérettel), is an arrangement by Hungarian composer Béla Bartók completed around 1928 of selected songs from a previous set entitled Ten Hungarian Folksongs, Sz. 33, BB 42.

== Background ==
Bartók spent many of his adult years traveling around modern-day Hungary and Romania collecting folk music. His educational vocation led him to write down many folk songs as he traveled, as these works would later be used for either educational purposes or concert performances and recitals. However, most of the early songs he collected called for a singer with piano accompaniment, but had the piano double the melody following the voice. That was the case in Ten Hungarian Folksongs, composed in 1906 for voice and piano, in a collection of twenty songs that also included ten additional songs by Zoltán Kodály. One of the first few known examples of Bartók pursuing artistic ambitions and reharmonizing songs without doubling the main melody was Eight Hungarian Folksongs.

Since Bartók started using in the 10s and 20s much of the folk material he collected in the early 20th century, he also recomposed some of the sets, with newer harmony and no voice doubling. Five Hungarian Folksongs was an example of that. It was presumably composed in 1928 with the intent of it being recorded for His Master's Voice, which he did on December 5, 1928, with soprano Vilma Medgyaszay. After it was recorded, it was forgotten about and lost until Béla Bartók's son, Béla Bartók III, sent the sketches used by Bartók for the recording in 1963, almost two decades after Bartók's death, to Denijs Dille.

Kálmán Nádasdy, Medgyaszay's teacher, confirmed that Bartók used those sketches during rehearsals and even managed to make copies of songs 1, 2, 4, and 8 of the original set. Since the revised set was not intended to be published or performed again, the pieces had to be thoroughly reconstructed from the sketches, as only the piano part was available and song No. 9 was not clearly readable and followed Medgyaszay's very rubato and casual recitation. The voice part was taken directly from the original set.

Even though the set was presumably finished for recording in 1928, it was published only much later, in 1970, by Editio Musica Budapest.

== Structure ==
The set consists of five short songs and has a total duration of five minutes. The song list is as follows:

Song No. (Note: The number in parentheses refers to the song number in the original set, BB 42.)	Title	English title (Note: The official translation of this cycle's text was provided by Nancy Bush.)	Bars	Tempo marking	Duration (Note: Durations are taken from the original Bartók recordings, as the set was never expected to be published and Bartók never wrote any duration indications.)
I (1)	Elindultam szép hazámbul	Far Behind I Left My Country	14	= 48	66 s
II (2)	Által mennék én a Tiszán ladikon	Crossing the River	24	= 104-108	50 s
III (4)	A gyulai kert alatt	In the Summer Fields	24	= 104	55 s
IV (9)	Nem messze van ide kis Margitta	The Horseman	27	= ca. 72 (Parlando, molto liberamente)	114 s
V (8)	Végigmentem a tárkányi	Walking Through the Town	18	= 108	44 s
