= Second Rhapsody (disambiguation) =

Second Rhapsody or Rhapsody No. 2 may refer to the following musical works:

- Béla Bartók: Rhapsody No. 2 (Bartók) for piano and orchestra (1928)
- Johannes Brahms: The second of the two Rhapsodies, Op. 79 (Brahms) for piano solo (1879)
- George Gershwin: Second Rhapsody for piano and orchestra (1931)
