= Ten Easy Pieces (Bartók) =

Hungarian piano composition collection

- by Béla Bartók
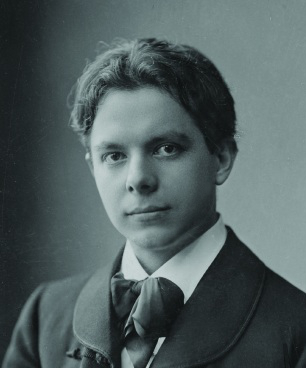
- Béla Bartók in 1903
- Native name: Tíz könnyű zongoradarab
- Catalogue: Sz. 39; BB 51
- Composed: 1908
- Published: 1909 – Budapest
- Movements: 11
- Scoring: Piano

Ten Easy Pieces, Sz. 39, BB 51 (Hungarian: Tíz könnyű zongoradarab) is a collection of short pieces for piano by Hungarian composer Béla Bartók. It was composed in 1908.

== Composition ==
Though initially it was conceived as Eleven Piano Recital Pieces, one of the pieces was dropped and used as a bagatelle in Bartók's Fourteen Bagatelles. However, he was required by a contractual obligation with his publisher to write eleven pieces, so he wrote a dedication which is not numbered but serves to complement the set. For this reason, this set and his set of bagatelles are related, both in their harmonic and rhythmic styles and in their educational vocation. These works were heavily influenced by Bartók's fascination with folk music and by his admiration for Claude Debussy, who had, by then, made a name for himself.

Whereas Fourteen Bagatelles is decidedly more difficult for young pianists, this set was planned to serve as an easy contemporary preparation for students. It is, indeed, being used in the intermediate piano repertoire, together with his other set of short pieces, For Children. The set was published a year later, in 1909, by Rozsnyai Károly.

== Structure ==
The set consists of eleven pieces in total, although the initial dedication is not numbered. It has an overall approximate duration of 17 minutes. The movement list is as follows:

0. Dedication
1. Peasant Song
2. Frustration
3. Slovakian Boys' Dance
4. Sostenuto
5. Evening in Transylvania
6. Hungarian Folksong
7. Dawn
8. Slovakian Folksong
9. Five-Finger Exercise
10. Bear Dance

Bartók makes extensive use of pentatonic scales, modes, novel harmonies and ostinato. All the pieces have a duration of about one or two minutes. Of the eleven pieces, only three are based on folk tunes: numbers three, six and eight. The rest of the pieces were created in their entirety by Bartók, who used to make a great number of short pieces for piano using folk-like structures and melodies. The dedication uses material that he associated with his friend, the violinist Stefi Geyer, to whom he dedicated his first violin concerto. The motif in this dedication was thoroughly used both in the concerto and in his Two Portraits, as well as in the last of his Fourteen Bagatelles, all of them written between 1906 and 1908.

The set begins with a slow motif in the dedication, consisting of just four notes.

Following the dedication, the first piece begins and is a very simple melody played in unison which is marked allegro moderato.

The second piece, alternatively translated as Lake boys' dance, has an ostinato bass line while the melody is being played with the right hand.

The third piece, which is an arrangement of a folk tune, already presents some of the elements seen in the previous pieces, both unison and accompaniment.

The fourth piece, in turn, becomes a slow tenuto piece where the melody is played with both the left and the right hand, but not in unison.

The fifth piece is the longest in the set. Its structure is strictly ABABA, and the melody is played exclusively with the right hand.

The sixth, an arrangement of a popular folk song, explores rhythm with both hands.

The seventh presents melodies in thirds where harmonies clash constantly, as opposed to the sixth whose melody revolves around a pre-set folk tune.

The eighth arrangement in the set is, again, a tenuto-like piece which is constructed using a folksong melody.

Then, the ninth piece is a study to practice scales with all five fingers.

Finally, the tenth piece in the set consists of a well-known melody accompanied by a bouncing note in the bass line.

Bartók is known to have played pieces five and ten for recording on November 20, 1929, although it is unknown if he ever recorded himself playing the rest of the pieces. Recording whole compositions used for educational purposes was an uncommon practice at the time, since recording at length was expensive.

== See also ==
- List of solo piano compositions by Béla Bartók
