= String Quartet No. 2 (Bartók) =

String Quartet
- No. 2
- by Béla Bartók
- Catalogue: Sz. 67
- Composed: 1915–17
- Dedication: Waldbauer-Kerpely Quartet
- Performed: 3 March 1918: Budapest
- Published: 1920
- Movements: three

The String Quartet No. 2 in A minor by Béla Bartók was written between 1915 and October 1917 in Rákoskeresztúr in Hungary. It is one of six string quartets by Bartok.

Bartók string quartet number 2, second movement, played by the Carmel Quartet

The work is in three movements:

1. Moderato
2. Allegro molto capriccioso
3. Lento

In a letter to André Gertier, Bartók described the first movement as being in sonata form, the second as "a kind of rondo" and the third as "difficult to define" but possibly a sort of ternary form. Zoltán Kodály, who thought of the three movements of this quartet as "life episodes," heard "peaceful life" in the first movement, and for all its roiling emotions, the movement does indeed leave an impression of tranquility at the end.

The brooding, intense last movement (Kodály heard it as "suffering") is particularly funereal because it is as immobile as the second movement is animated. Long stretches are rhythmically static, and the parts that do move are often interrupted by silence.

The work was dedicated to the Waldbauer-Kerpely String Quartet, who gave the piece its premiere on 3 March 1918 in Budapest. The work was first published in 1920 by Universal Edition.

== Discography ==
Year	Performer	Label
2019	Quatuor Ragazze	Channel Classics
2017	Heath Quartet	Harmonia Mundi - HMM90766162
2007	Quatuor Ebene	Mirare
1997	Takács Quartet	Decca
1988	Emerson Quartet	Deutsche Grammophon
1963	Juilliard String Quartet	Sony Classical - 5062312
1950	Juilliard String Quartet	Sony Classical - 19439831102
