= String Quartet No. 1 (Bartók) =

String Quartet in A minor
- No. 1
- by Béla Bartók
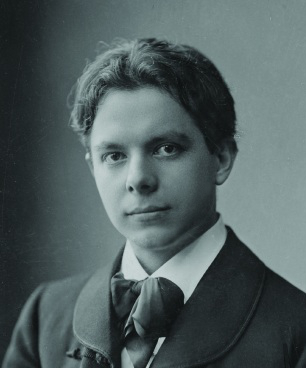
- Béla Bartók in 1903
- Catalogue: Sz. 40
- Opus: 7
- Composed: 1909
- Performed: 19 March 1910: Budapest
- Published: 1911
- Movements: Three

The String Quartet No. 1 in A minor by Hungarian composer Béla Bartók was completed in 1909. The score is dated January 27 of that year. It is one of six string quartets by Bartok.

The piece was premiered on 19 March 1910 in Budapest by the Waldbauer-Kerpely Quartet, two days after Bartók played the piano with them in a concert dedicated to the music of Zoltán Kodály. It was first published in 1911 in Hungary.

== Music ==
The work is in three movements, played without breaks between each:

1. Lento
2. Allegretto (sometimes referred to as Poco a poco accelerando all'allegretto) – Introduzione
3. Allegro vivace

The work was at least in part inspired by Bartók's unrequited love for the violinist Stefi Geyer – in a letter to her, he called the first movement a "funeral dirge" and its opening notes trace a motif which first appeared in his Violin Concerto No. 1, a work dedicated to Geyer and suppressed by Bartók for many years. The intense contrapuntal writing of this movement is often compared to Beethoven's String Quartet No. 14, Op. 131, the opening movement of which is a slow fugue.

The following two movements are progressively faster, and the mood of the work lightens considerably, ending quite happily. The third movement is generally considered to be the most typical of Bartók's mature style, including early evidence of his interest in Hungarian folk music.

== Discography ==
Year	Performers	Label
2019	Quatuor Ragazze	Channel Classics – CCS 41419
2018	Ariel String Quartet	Avie Records
2007	Quatuor Ebene	Mirare
1997	Takács Quartet	Decca
1988	Emerson Quartet	Deutsche Grammophon
1981	Juilliard String Quartet	Sony Classical
1963	Juilliard String Quartet	Sony Classical - 5062312
1950	Juilliard String Quartet	Sony Classical - 19439831102
