= Rhapsody (music) =

One-movement musical work

A rhapsody in music is a one-movement work that is episodic yet integrated, free-flowing in structure, featuring a range of highly contrasted moods, color, and tonality. An air of spontaneous inspiration and a sense of improvisation make it freer in form than a set of variations.

The word rhapsody is derived from the Greek: ῥαψῳδός, rhapsōidos, a reciter of epic poetry (a rhapsodist), and came to be used in Europe by the 16th century as a designation for literary forms, not only epic poems, but also for collections of miscellaneous writings and, later, any extravagant expression of sentiment or feeling. In the 18th century, literary rhapsodies first became linked with music, as in Christian Friedrich Daniel Schubart's Musicalische Rhapsodien (1786), a collection of songs with keyboard accompaniment, together with a few solo keyboard pieces. The first solo piano compositions with the title, however, were Václav Jan Tomášek’s fifteen Rhapsodies, the first of which appeared in 1810. Although vocal examples may be found as late as Brahms's Alto Rhapsody, Op. 53 (1869), in the 19th century the rhapsody had become primarily an instrumental form, first for the piano and then, in the second half of the century, a large-scale nationalistic orchestral "epic"—a fashion initiated by Franz Liszt. Interest in Romani violin playing beginning in the mid-19th century led to a number of important pieces in that style, in particular by Liszt, Antonín Dvořák, George Enescu, Ernst von Dohnányi, and Béla Bartók, and in the early 20th century British composers exhibiting the influence of folksong composed a number of examples, including Ralph Vaughan Williams's three Norfolk Rhapsodies, George Butterworth's A Shropshire Lad, and Frederick Delius's Brigg Fair (which is subtitled "An English Rhapsody").

In modern times, several composers have endeavored to feature non-traditional orchestral instruments within the context of the rhapsody. During the post World War II era, John Serry Sr. showcased the chromatic piano accordion within his American Rhapsody (Alpha Music Publishing, 1955). Decades later, Ney Gabriel Rosauro included the Brazilian berimbau as well as the Brazilian repinique within his Rhapsody for Solo Percussion and Orchestra (1992) while also incorporating an optional section in which the performers are encouraged to include a favorite exotic or folklordic instrument.

In 1975, the British rock band Queen released "Bohemian Rhapsody", a bombastic mock-operatic rock song which is in the form of a four-part suite, but performed with rock instrumentation. Though described by its composer Freddie Mercury as a "mock opera", it has also been characterized as a "sort of seven-minute rock cantata (or 'megasong') in three distinct movements". It became one of the UK's best-selling singles of all time.

Some familiar examples may give an idea of the character of a rhapsody:

- Hugo Alfvén, Swedish Rhapsody No. 1 (Midsommarvaka), for orchestra
- Béla Bartók, Rhapsody No. 1 and Rhapsody No. 2 for violin and piano (also arranged for orchestra)
- Johannes Brahms, Two Rhapsodies, Op. 79, and Rhapsody in E-flat major, Op. 119, No. 4, for solo piano
- Emmanuel Chabrier, España, rhapsody for orchestra
- Claude Debussy, Première rhapsodie for clarinet and piano (also orchestrated by the composer)
- Claude Debussy, Rhapsody for alto saxophone and orchestra
- Ernst von Dohnányi, Four Rhapsodies, Op. 11, for solo piano
- George Enescu, Romanian Rhapsodies Nos. 1 and 2, for orchestra
- Edward German, Welsh Rhapsody, for orchestra
- George Gershwin, Rhapsody in Blue, Second Rhapsody, for piano and orchestra
- James P. Johnson, Yamekraw—A Negro Rhapsody
- Herbert Howells, Three Rhapsodies, Op. 17, for solo organ
- Franz Liszt, Hungarian Rhapsodies for solo piano
- David Popper, Hungarian Rhapsody
- Sergei Rachmaninoff, Rhapsody on a Theme of Paganini, Op. 43, for piano and orchestra
- Maurice Ravel, Rapsodie espagnole, for orchestra
- Ralph Vaughan Williams, Norfolk Rhapsody No. 1, for orchestra
- Pancho Vladigerov, Bulgarian Rhapsody "Vardar"

== See also ==
- Fantasia (music)
- Potpourri (music)
