= Eight Hungarian Folksongs =

Hungarian piano composition

- by Béla Bartók
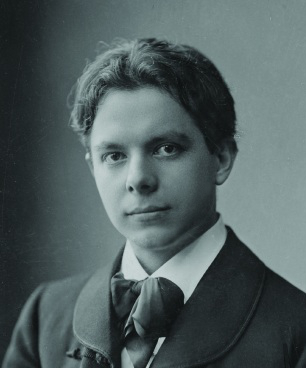
- Béla Bartók in 1903
- Native name: Nyolc magyar népdal
- Catalogue: Sz. 64; BB 47
- Composed: 1907–1917
- Published: 1922: Vienna
- Scoring: High voice and piano

Eight Hungarian Folksongs, Sz. 64, BB 47 (Hungarian: Nyolc magyar népdal) is a song cycle for high voice and piano by Hungarian composer Béla Bartók. It was composed between 1907 and 1917.

== Composition ==
The Eight Hungarian Folksongs were composed in two different periods. The first five songs were written in 1907. On this occasion, Bartók spent time traveling around Csík County in Transylvania and collecting folk music. The first song was collected in 1906, and the other four were collected in 1907. They were initially known as 5 Székely songs or Five Old Hungarian Folk Songs from Csík County and were premiered on 27 November 1911, in Budapest, with opera singer Dezső Róna and Bartók himself at the piano. However, the last three were completed in 1917, after a trip around Hungary in 1916 and 1917 where he gathered music from Hungarian soldiers for some other song cycles also finished in 1917 and afterwards.

These three songs were initially known as Székely Soldiers Songs and premiered on 12 January 1918, in Vienna, with Ferenc Székelyhidy and Bartók. This was the first time Bartók decided to depart from his earlier primitive compositional style, as Bartók's desire to educate the public was so evident that the melody in his folksongs was doubled by the right hand of the pianist (in which case, if there was an amateur singer or no singer at all, the melody could still be heard). These eight songs, despite being composed ten years apart, were the first example of Bartók not doubling the melodies, and he also followed that style in future collections of folk music.

Since Bartók's collections of songs were not meant to be played as cycles, but that the performer should rather mix and match them as Bartók also did at the time, Eight Hungarian Folksongs is not very well known as a song cycle. The set was first published by Universal Edition in 1922. However, the copyright was reassigned to Hawkes and Son in 1939, with catalog number B. & H. 18065.

== Structure ==
The set consists of eight untitled folksongs, although the title is generally taken from the incipit of each song. There are some conflicting publications about the scoring: while some publications call for voice and piano, the latest editions call for a high voice and a piano. The movement list is as follows:

	Incipit	English translation (Note: The official translation of this cycle's text was provided by Nancy Bush.)	Bars	Tempo marking	Approx. duration (Note: These duration indications were provided by Bartók himself. He wrote durations for most of his solo piano output.)
1	Fekete főd, fehér az én zsebkendőm	Snow-white kerchief, dark both field and furrow show	17	Adagio	70 s
2	Istenem, istenem, áraszd meg a vizet	Coldly runs the river, reedy banks o'erflowing	29	Andante	74 s
3	Aszszonyok, aszszonyok, had’ legyek társatok	Women, women, listen, let me share your labour	37	Allegretto (Tempo giusto)	60 s
4	Anynyi bánat az szűvemen	Skies above are heavy with rain	24	Sostenuto, rubato	65 s
5	Ha kimegyek arr’ a magos tetőre	If I climb the rocky mountains all day through	34	Allegro	60 s
6	Töltik a nagy erdő útját	All the lads to war they've taken	30	Sostenuto	80 s
7	Eddig való dolgom a tavaszi szántás	Spring begins with labour; then's the time for sowing	39	Sostenuto	75 s
8	Olvad a hó, csárdás kis angyalom	Snow is melting, oh, my dear, my darling	27	Allegro moderato (Tempo giusto)	55 s

== Recordings ==
Even though there is virtually no information on early performances of this cycle (and Bartók most likely handpicked some songs for separate performances in recitals), he did record the entire set, except for song 4, on 7 December 1928, in Budapest; Basilides Mária sang movements 1, 2, 3, and 5, and Ferenc Székelyhidy performed movements 6 to 8. The recording was released decades later on CD by EMI Classics.
