= Village Scenes =

Song cycle by Béla Bartók

Falun (In the Village)
- by Béla Bartók
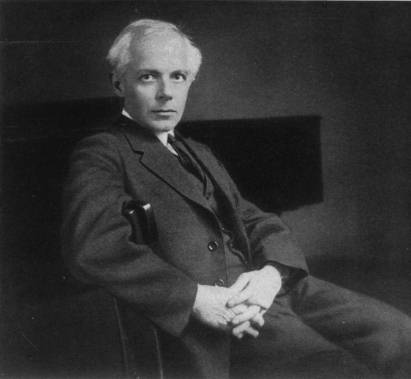
- Béla Bartók in 1927
- Native name: Falun; Dedinské scény Dorfszenen
- Catalogue: Sz. 78 (orch. Sz. 79); BB 87a (arr. BB 87b)
- Composed: 1924 (rev. Peter Bartók 1994)
- Published: 1927:
- Scoring: Female voice and piano

Falun (In the Village), Sz. 78, BB 87a, is a 1924 set of five Slovak folk songs for female voice and piano by Hungarian composer Béla Bartók.

Bartók arranged the last three of the songs two years later for four (or eight) female voices and small orchestra. These were published in 1927 by Universal Edition in Vienna under the title Three Village Scenes (or Tri dedinské scény, or Drei Dorfszenen) and were assigned the number Sz. 79 when András Szőllősy made his catalog.

== Background ==
Bartók, a composer primarily known for collecting and arranging folk music from central and eastern Europe, wrote this set of folk songs while on a project and journey around Europe that spanned several decades, starting around the 1900s. The folk tunes were collected in and around the Zólyom County area, which is in modern-day Slovakia, around 1915–6. It was finished in December 1924 in Budapest and dedicated to his second wife, Ditta. It was engraved and published under Universal Edition some years later, in 1927, along with many other song collections made in earlier years. It then faded into obscurity until Béla's son, Peter Bartók, revised and republished the piece in 1994, by examining both the published version and the manuscripts left behind by the composer together with scholars Eve Beglarian and Nelson Dellamaggiore.

== Structure ==
The set consists of five songs and has a total duration of around 12 minutes. It is scored for a female voice and piano. The entire set has been translated into English by Martin Lindsay, German by Benedikt Szabolcsi, and Hungarian by Viktor Lány. The movement list is as follows:

	Title (English)	Title (Slovak)	Title (Hungarian)	Title (German)	Incipit	Tempo marking	Bars	Duration (Note: The approximate duration of each movement was given by Bartók himself, which was common among his folk tune arrangements.)
1	Haymaking	Pri hrabaní	Szénagyűjtéskor	Heuernte	"Ej! Hrabajželen, hrabaj"	Largo	26	1 min 8 s
2	At the Bride's	Pri neveste	A menyasszonynál	Bei der Braut	"Letia pávy, letia"	Lento	20	1 min 20 s
3	Wedding	Svatba	Lakodalom	Hochzeit	"A ty Anča krásna"	Vivacissimo	112	2 min 35 s
4	Lullaby	Ukoliebavka	Bölcsődal	Wiegenlied	"Beli žemi, beli"	Andante	73	3 min 20 s
5	Lads' Dance	Tanec mládencov	Legénytánc	Burschentanz	"Poza búčky, poza peň"	Comodo	103	1 min 46 s

== Arrangements ==
Bartók wrote an arrangement of the last three songs of the set for a small choir of four to eight female voices and orchestra in 1926. This arrangement received the catalog numbers Sz. 79, BB 87b. It was completed in May 1926.

== Recordings ==
- Mezzo-soprano Klára Csordás and pianist Adrienne Krausz recorded this piece at the Festetics Palace, in June 1994. The recording was released on CD by Pyramid Records.
