= Romanian Christmas Carols =

Composition by Béla Bartók

Romanian Christmas Carols, Sz, 57, BB 67 (Hungarian: Román kolindadallamok) is a set of little colinde, typical Christmas songs from Romanian villages, habitually sung by small groups of children, adapted in 1915 by Hungarian composer Béla Bartók to be played on the piano after hearing them sung in the below villages.

== Structure ==
This work consists of twenty little songs put together into two major series. The movements are listed as follows:

Series A

1. "Pă cel plai de munte" (from the region of Várhely, in Hunyad). Allegro
2. "Întreabă și-ntreabă" (from the region of Malomvíz, in Hunyad). Allegro
3. "Doi roagă să roagă" (from the region of Malomvíz, in Hunyad). Allegro
4. "Ciucur verde de mătase" (from the region of Temesmonostor, in Temes). Andante
5. "Coborâ-to, coborâ-to" (from the region of Alsóvisó, in Máramaros). Allegro moderato
6. "În patru cornuți de lume" (from the region of Görgényorsova, in Maros-Torda). Andante
7. "La lină fântână" (from the region of Sárafalva, in Torontál). Andante
8. "Noi umblăm da corindare" (from the region of Sárafalva, in Torontál). Allegretto
9. "Noi acum ortacilor" (from the region of Bisztra, in Torda-Aranyos). Allegro
10. "Trei crai de la Răsărit" (from the region of Rogos, in Bihar). Più allegro

Series B

11. "Colo-n jos la munte-n josu" (from the region of Körtekapu, in Maros-Torda). Molto moderato
12. "Deasupra pă răsăritu" (from the region of Várhely, in Hunyad). Moderato
13. "Crește-mi, Doamne, creștinu" (from the region of Cserbel, in Hunyad). Andante
14. "Sculați, sculați, boieri mari" (from the region of Felsőoroszi, in Maros-Torda). Andante
15. "Ăi, colo-n josu mai din josu" (from the region of Cserbel, in Hunyad). Moderato
16. "Și-o luat, luată" (from the region of Libánfalva, in Maros-Torda). Andante
17. "Colo sus mai susu" (from the region of Temesmonostor, in Temes). Variante della precedente
  XVIIb. "Și-o luat, luată" (reprise). Andante
18. "Colo sus pă după lună" (from the region of Gyalán, in Bihar). Allegro
19. "De cei Domnul bun" (from the region of Várhely, in Hunyad). Allegretto
20. "Hai cu toții să suimu" (from the region of Gyalár, in Hunyad). Allegro

The movement numbered XVIIb is generally appended to the previous one, and, in publications, the variation is represented as a single movement, even though it is clearly specified where the reprise begins. Bartók also wrote a concert version with slight variations to the original version. These changes consist mostly of denser chords and octaves.

== Notable recordings ==
Notable recordings of this composition include:

Piano Solo	Record Company	Year of Recording	Format
Jenő Jandó	Naxos Records	2005	CD
Pietro Spada	Arts Music	2008	CD
