= Suite, Op. 14 (Bartók) =

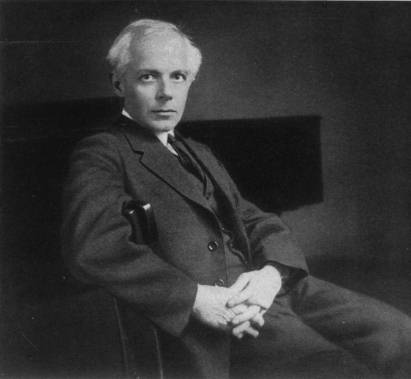
Béla Bartók in 1927

The Suite, Op. 14, Sz. 62, BB 70 is a piece for solo piano written by Béla Bartók. It was written in February 1916, published in 1918, and debuted by the composer on April 21, 1919, in Budapest. The Suite is one of Bartók's most significant works for piano, only comparable with his 1926 Piano Sonata.

Though much of Bartók's work makes frequent use of Eastern European folk music, this suite is one of the few pieces without melodies of folk origin. (At times incorrect: The majority of Bartok’s major works do not use actual folk melodies) However, Romanian, Arabic, and North African rhythmic influences can still be found in some movements.

Originally intending the suite to be a five-movement work, Bartók later decided against the idea and discarded the second movement, the Andante, which was published only posthumously in the October 1955 issue of Új Zenei Szemle (New Musical Review).

The 1918 version, without the Andante, takes between 8 and 9 minutes to perform and is played in four movements:

1. Allegretto (duration specified by Bartók: c. 2 min)
2. Scherzo (c. 1 min 50 s)
3. Allegro molto (c. 2 min 5 s)
4. Sostenuto (c. 2 min 35 s)

== Analysis ==
...The Suite op. 14 has no folk tunes. It is based entirely on original themes of my own invention. When this work was composed I had in mind the refining of piano technique, the changing of piano technique, into a more transparent style. A style more of bone and muscle opposing the heavy chordal style of the late, latter romantic period, that is, unessential ornaments like broken chords and other figures are omitted and it is more a simpler style.

— Béla Bartók, radio interview with David Levita, July 2, 1944

According to Bartók, the Suite is part of a new trend in piano technique that he saw as a break from his earlier Post-romantic writing. In 1945, he claimed to have used only the most restricted means of piano technique in this work, "accentuating in some of its movements the percussive character of the piano."

Though Bartók does not quote from folk melodies in this composition, he makes extensive use of other folk-like elements, such as a Romanian Ardeleana rhythm in the first movement. In addition, the third movement of this Suite shows Arabic influence, the earliest Bartók work of its kind, and a North African influence in its ostinato and scalar patterns. Throughout the piece, he uses exotic scale patterns, such as the Lydian and whole tone scales in the first movement; in addition, there is a twelve-tone row in the second movement, which is probably the only one in Bartók's entire oeuvre.

== See also ==
- 20th-century classical music
