= Violin Concerto No. 2 (Bartók) =

1937/38 composition by Béla Bartók

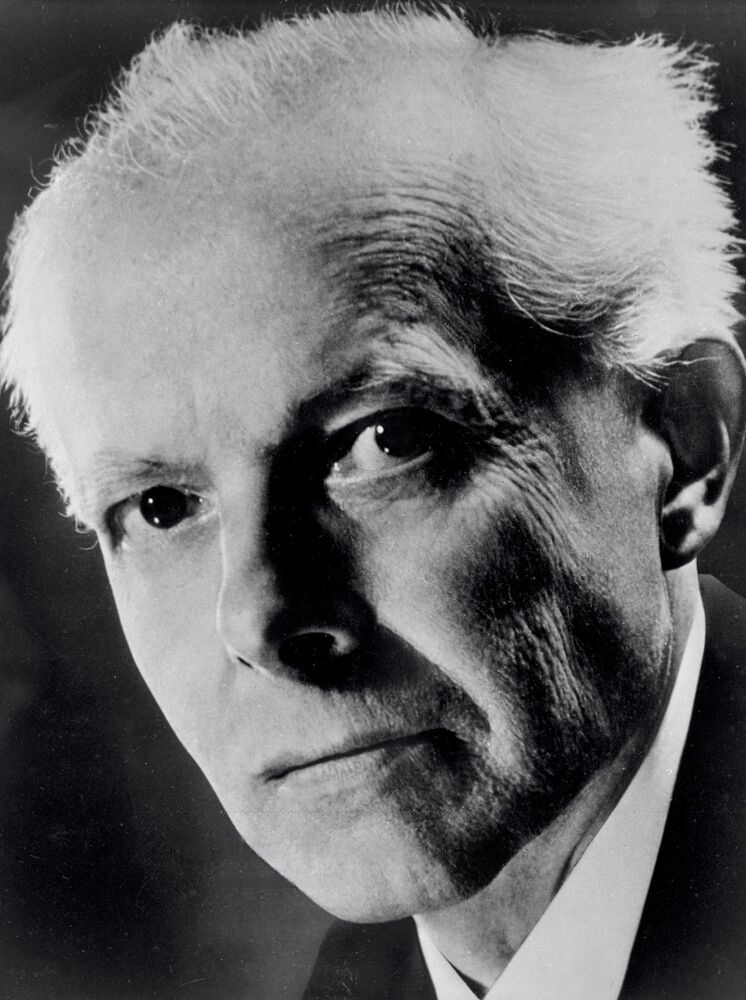
Béla Bartók in 1943

Béla Bartók's Violin Concerto No. 2, Sz. 112, BB 117 was written in 1937–38. During the composer's life, it was known simply as his Violin Concerto. His other violin concerto, Violin Concerto No. 1, Sz. 36, BB 48a, was written in the years 1907–08, but only published in 1956, after the composer's death, as "Violin Concerto No. 1, Op. posth."

Bartók composed the concerto in a difficult stage of his life, when he was filled with serious concerns about the growing strength of fascism. He was of firm anti-fascist opinions, and therefore became the target of various attacks in pre-war Hungary.

Bartók initially planned to write a single-movement concerto set of variations, but Zoltán Székely wanted a standard three-movement concerto. In the end, Székely received his three movements, while Bartók received his variations: the second movement is a formal set of variations, and the third movement is a variation on material from the first.

Though the piece does not employ twelve-tone technique, it contains twelve-tone themes, such as in the first and third movements:

Bartók's twelve-tone theme from the Second Violin Concerto's first movement

The work was premiered at the Concertgebouw, Amsterdam, on 23 March 1939 with Zoltán Székely on violin and Willem Mengelberg conducting the Concertgebouw Orchestra.

It had its United States premiere in Cleveland, Ohio, in 1943, with Tossy Spivakovsky on the violin accompanied by the Cleveland Orchestra conducted by Artur Rodziński. Spivakovsky later gave the New York and San Francisco premieres of the work.

== Structure ==
It has the following three movements:

1. Allegro non troppo
2. Andante tranquillo
3. Allegro molto

The concerto is scored for 2 flutes (2nd doubling piccolo), 2 oboes (2nd doubling English horn), 2 clarinets (2nd doubling bass clarinet), 2 bassoons (2nd doubling contrabassoon), 4 horns, 2 trumpets, 3 trombones, timpani, side drum, bass drum, cymbals, triangle, tamtam (gong), celesta, harp, and strings.

== Selected recordings ==
- Bartók: Violin Concerto [No. 2] – Zoltán Székely (violin), Royal Concertgebouw Orchestra, conducted by Willem Mengelberg.
- Bartók / Stravinsky: Violin Concerto No. 2 / Violin Concerto – Viktoria Mullova (violin), Los Angeles Philharmonic, conducted by Esa-Pekka Salonen.
- Bartók: Violin Concertos Nos. 1 & 2 – Thomas Zehetmair (violin), Budapest Festival Orchestra, IIván Fischer (cond.) Berlin Classics.
- Bartók: Violin Concertos Nos. 1 & 2, Viola Concerto – James Ehnes (violin) with the BBC Philharmonic, conducted by Gianandrea Noseda.
