= Three Rondos on Slovak Folk Tunes =

Piano composition by Béla Bartók

- by Béla Bartók
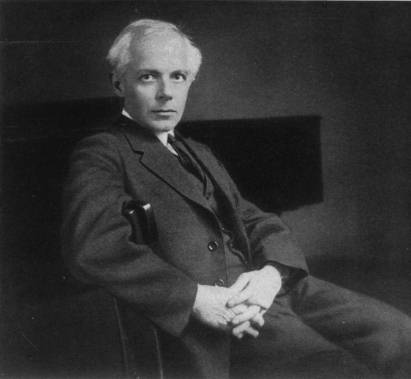
- Béla Bartók, at the time of the composition.
- Native name: Három rondo népi dallamokkal
- Catalogue: Sz. 84, BB 92
- Form: Rondo
- Composed: 1916 – 1927:
- Movements: 3
- Scoring: Piano

Three Rondos on Slovak Folk Tunes, Sz. 84, BB 92 (Hungarian: Három rondo népi dallamokkal), also referred to as Three Rondos on Folk Tunes, is a collection of three small pieces for piano by Hungarian composer Béla Bartók.

== Composition ==
Béla Bartók had a lifelong artistic interest in folk music primarily from modern day Romania and Hungary. This is shown in his output as a composer since, even though Bartók first intended to use opus numbers to categorize his most artistically relevant compositions, he eventually refused to use any numbering system. The first of the three rondos was composed in 1916, together with many other compositions based on Hungarian and Romanian folk songs. Bartók composed the rondo while he was collecting folk tunes from Hungary and surrounding areas. It is a somewhat faithful transcription of a children's tune named Lánc, lánc, eszterlánc, with a few ornamentations, that he made in one of his trips.

The other two rondos were composed in 1927 and follow a much more different style from their preceding one. The compositional structure is much more complex and rhythms are much more emphasized than in the first rondo. The traditional melodies are still present but are developed much further. Béla Bartók admitted to have tried to include a third theme for the second rondo, whereas rondos usually have only two themes, but eventually decided not to include it for practicality reasons. All three rondos were compiled together and published by Universal Edition, Vienna, later in 1930.

== Structure ==
The collection of three rondos takes around 8–9 minutes to perform, with each rondo taking around 2 or 3 minutes. The list of rondos is as follows:

1. Andante
2. Vivacissimo
3. Allegro molto

All rondos follow a rondo-like form, in which a first theme is presented, then a second theme, then a somewhat developed version of the first theme. The different themes in each rondo are also in different tonalities.
