= Rhapsody, Op. 1 (Bartók) =

1904 composition for piano by Béla Bartók

Rhapsody
- by Béla Bartók
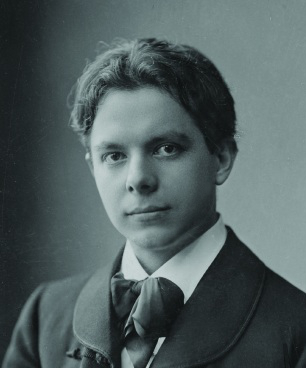
- Bartók in 1903
- Catalogue: Sz. 26, BB 36a and b
- Opus: 1
- Form: Rhapsody
- Composed: 1904
- Scoring: Piano, or piano and orchestra

Rhapsody, Op. 1, Sz. 26, BB 36, is a composition for piano by Hungarian composer Béla Bartók. It was finished in 1904. A year later, he wrote a version for piano and orchestra. The catalogue number of this composition is Op. 1, Sz. 26. The initial full-length composition for piano eventually received a catalogue number BB 36a, whereas the second version, with piano and orchestra, received a catalogue number BB 36b.

== Composition ==
The Rhapsody for piano was a very important work, especially for the fact that it was at that time when Bartók decided to begin his third list of compositions. In this stage, he decided to embark on a new period in his artistic career where he would mainly explore folk music from Romania and Hungary. This turned out to be the pivotal work from which he would develop a new direction for both his compositional style and his preoccupations as an artist.

The Rhapsody was completed in late 1904 and was dedicated to Emma Gruber, who later became the wife of Zoltán Kodály. Drafts for the composition are not extant. The virtuoso piano writing of the work's "elaborate textures and sectional contrasts" relates to the model of Franz Liszt.

After five revisions and updates, Bartók also released a version for piano and orchestra in 1905 and a version for two pianos. In 1907, Bartók also composed a fourth version of the same piece, which was shortened by almost half of the total length of the composition.

== Structure ==
The composition is in one movement and takes 21 minutes to perform, even though the shortened version takes only half of the total duration. Critics have frequently stated that the loose structure calls for two contrasting sections; however, it is not marked as such in the score. According to some critics, Bartók used a Lisztian style, with very elaborate and vast chords and long and vastly ornamented scales and arpeggios. The composition starts with a fourteen-minute Adagio molto, which goes on to a second section, marked Poco allegretto.

== Reception ==
When Bartók decided to submit the composition as an entry in the composers' category of the Anton Rubinstein Competition in Paris, 1905, it received no official recognition. Critics have acknowledged that this was a first step for his later compositions. Critics have also praised the Lisztian character of the composition, even though the style that he would later develop is diluted. Reviewer Michael Morrison said: "This Rhapsody must be assessed as a finely crafted but derivative effort, whose length may not be fully justified".
