= Eight Improvisations on Hungarian Peasant Songs =

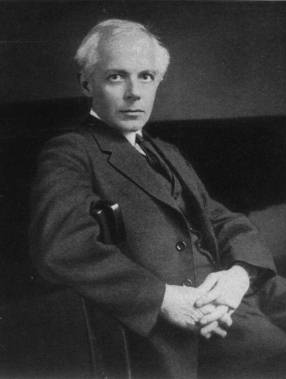
Béla Bartók in 1927

Eight Improvisations on Hungarian Peasant Songs, Op. 20, Sz. 74, BB 83, also known as Improvisations on Hungarian Peasant Songs or simply as Improvisations, is a composition for solo piano by Hungarian composer Béla Bartók. It was finished in 1920.

This composition is the last one on which Bartók put an Opus number because henceforth he would treat his folk music and his more artistic side as equal. However, this work is far from his folk pieces, with its abrasive harmonies and rhythms.

== Structure ==
This composition has eight movements:

1. Molto moderato
2. Molto capriccioso
3. Lento, rubato
4. Allegretto scherzando
5. Allegro molto
6. Allegro moderato, molto capriccioso
7. Sostenuto, rubato
8. Allegro

The first movement, Molto moderato, the original melody is repeated three times without not much variation and a coda at the end. The mode of this melody comes from the Dorian mode scale on C, but the accompaniment plays unrelated triad chords, all of them derived from melody notes.

In the second movement, Molto capriccioso, the main melody is repeated also three times, but here, even though it shares its Dorian mode on C, there are fragments written in Mixolydian mode, its rhythm is much more syncopated, there are much more sudden tempo changes and it is much more dissonant than the first.

The third movement, Lento rubato, is polytonal.

The fourth, Allegretto scherzando, is a very quick scherzo-like movement.

The fifth movement, Allegro molto, uses the pentatonic scale and also counterpoint and polytonal harmonies all along the movement.

The sixth movement, Allegro moderato, molto capriccioso, is a bitonal movement; one hand plays only in the black keys of the piano, making a melody on a pentatonic scale, while the other hand uses all of the white keys, which create dissonances.

The seventh movement, Sostenuto, rubato, is dedicated to the memory of French composer Claude Debussy, for Bartók's music was very influenced by Debussy's style when Bartók was a young composer. It was published separately from this work in a memorial supplement of La revue musicale, published in December 1920 and dedicated to late Debussy, even though this movement contains no references to any of Debussy's works nor to his composition style.

The eighth movement, Allegro, is in a variation form, and its melody is repeated over and over, like in the first movement. The melody is somehow similar to that of the second movement's.

== Notable recordings ==
Notable recordings include:

Piano Solo	Record Company	Year of Recording	Format
Jenő Jandó	Naxos Records	2005	CD
