= Suite paysanne hongroise =

The Suite Paysanne Hongroise is an arrangement of music by Béla Bartók, by Paul Arma.

The suite consists of folk song arrangements originally written for piano, and was transcribed for flute and piano by Paul Arma; later he also arranged it for flute and orchestra. It is based on folk songs that Bartók collected in Eastern Europe.
