= Violin Concerto No. 1 (Bartók) =

Violin concerto in two movements by Béla Bartók

- by Béla Bartók
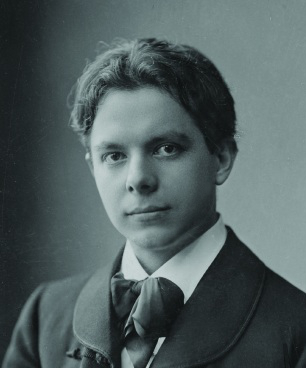
- Bartók in 1903
- Catalogue: Sz. 36; BB 128
- Composed: 1907–08
- Dedication: Stefi Geyer
- Performed: May 30, 1958: Basel
- Published: 1956
- Movements: 2

Béla Bartók's Violin Concerto No. 1, Sz. 36, BB 48a was written in the years 1907–1908, but only published in 1956, 11 years after the composer's death, as "Violin Concerto No. 1, Op. posth." It was premiered on 30 May 1958 in Basel, Switzerland.

== Background ==
The concerto was dedicated, as was Othmar Schoeck's concerto for the same instrument, to the violinist Stefi Geyer, with whom Bartók was in love. Geyer could not reciprocate Bartók's feelings and rejected the concerto. It was revived after both Bartók and Geyer had died. Geyer's copy of the manuscript was bequeathed to Paul Sacher to be performed by him and Hansheinz Schneeberger. The concerto was later championed by David Oistrakh.

== Structure ==
The composition strays from the path of the traditional concerto, having two rather than three movements:

1. Andante sostenuto
2. Allegro giocoso

Far from being an innovation, the two-movement form is the traditional design of the rhapsody: a slow movement followed by a fast one. Bartók had already used this form in 1904 for his first concertante work, the Rhapsody, Op. 1, for piano and orchestra (Mason 1958, 15).

Bartók used the Andante as the first of the Two Portraits, Op. 5, representing Stefi Geyer. It has been speculated that the second movement is a self-portrait of the composer (Mason 1958, 12).

The retrospective assignment of "No. 1" to this concerto (and the consequent redesignation of the Violin Concerto Bartók composed in 1936–1939 as "No. 2") has met with some resistance, especially from Hungarian scholars and musicologists, on grounds that the composer had "annulled" this concerto, not only by excluding it from his list of mature works but also by extracting the first movement and reworking it in 1911 as the first of Two Portraits, Op. 5. The objection has also been made that, even though an early String Quartet, composed in Pozsony (Bratislava), and an early Sonata for Violin and Piano have been published, the traditional numberings of the string quartets and the violin sonatas have not been changed (Újfalussy 1971, 355–356).

== Selected recordings ==
- Bartók / Hindemith – Concerto No. 1 for Violin and Orchestra / Concerto for Violin and Orchestra, David Oistrakh, Gennadi Rozhdestvensky, 1962.
- Berg / Bartók – Violin Concerto / Violin Concerto No. 1, Kyung Wha Chung, Chicago Symphony Orchestra, Georg Solti , Decca 1984.
- Bartók – Violin Concertos Nos. 1 and 2, György Pauk / National Polish Radio Symphony Orchestra (Katowice)* / Antoni Wit, Naxos 1999.
- Bartók – Violin Concertos Nos. 1 & 2, Viola Concerto, James Ehnes with the BBC Philharmonic, conducted by Gianandrea Noseda.
