= Hungarian folksongs for voice and piano (Bartók) =

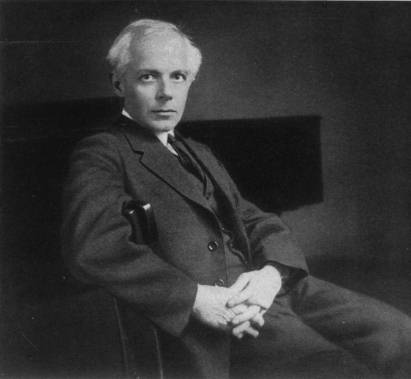
Béla Bartók in 1927

Magyar népdalok énekhangra és zongorára (English: Hungarian folk songs for voice and piano) is a collection of Hungarian folk song arrangements by Béla Bartók. Bartók's Hungarian Folksongs are now much better known outside Hungary in arrangements for violin and piano, or—without voice—for piano alone. One of the most famous songs "Elindultam szép hazámból" ("I left my beautiful fatherland") came to be applied to Bartók himself as he assumed the role of an exile.

== List of songs ==
=== 4 Songs BB 37 (Sz 29 / W –) ===
Hungarian Folksongs (1st series), nos. 1–4, for voice and piano (c.1904–1905)

1. Lekaszálták már a rétet ("They mowed the pasture already")
2. Add reám csókodat, el kell mennem ("Kiss me for I have to leave")
3. Fehér László lovat lopott ("László Fehér stole a horse]
4. Az egri ménes mind szürke ("The horses of Eger are all grey")

=== 10 Songs BB 42 (Sz 33 / W 13) ===
Hungarian Folksongs, for voice and piano (1906) (nos. 1–10: Béla Bartók; nos. 11–20: Zoltán Kodály not listed)

- Elindultam szép hazámból ("I left my beautiful country")
- Általmennék én a Tiszán ladikon
- Fehér László lovat lopott ("László Fehér stole a horse")
- A gyulai kert alatt ("In the summer fields")
- A kertmegi kert alatt ("I was in a summer garden")
- Ablakomba, ablakomba ("My window, my window")
- Száraz ágtól messze virít ("A dry branch of bloom in far")
- Végig mentem a tárkányi sej, haj, nagy uccán ("Walking through the town")
- Nem messze van ide ("Not far from here" – The Horseman)
- Szánt a babám csireg, csörög ("My love has gone ploughing")

(Five songs later recomposed as BB 97, 1928)

=== Magyar népdalok (II Booklet) BB 43 (Sz 33a / W –) ===
Hungarian Folksongs (2nd series), for voice and piano (nos. 1–10) (1906–1907)

- Tiszán innen, Tiszán túl, Túl a Dunán van egy csikós nyájastul. (" On this side of the Tisza, beyond the Tisza ")
- Erdők, völgyek (Forests, valleys)
- Olvad a hó ("The snow is melting")
- Ha bemegyek a csárdába ("If I go to the csárda")
- Fehér László ("László Fehér" – alternative version of the song)
- Megittam a piros bort ("I drank the red wine")
- Ez a kislány gyöngyöt fűz ("This little girl willow beads")
- Sej, mikor engem katonának visznek ("Sej, when are you taking me soldiers")
- Még azt mondják nem adnak galambomnak ("They say do not give my dove")
- Kis kece lányom És Tánc ("My dear young daughter and dance")

=== BB 44 (Sz 33b / W –) ===
Two Hungarian Folksongs, for voice and piano (1907)

1. Édesanyám rózsafája (My mother’s rose tree)
2. Túl vagy rózsám, túl vagy a Málnás erdején (My sweetheart, you are beyond the Málnás woods)

=== Eight Hungarian Folksongs BB 47 (Sz 64 / W 17) ===
Eight Hungarian Folksongs, for voice and piano (nos. 1–5: 1907; nos. 6–8: 1917)

1. Fekete főd, fehér az én zsebkendőm ("Snow-white kerchief, dark both field and furrow show")
2. Istenem, Istenem, áraszd meg a vizet ("Coldly runs the river, reedy banks o’er flowing")
3. Asszonyok, asszonyok, had’ legyek társatok ("Women, women, listen, let me share your labour")
4. Annyi bánat a szívemen ("Skies above are heavy with rain")
5. Ha kimegyek arr’ a magos tetőre ("If I climb the rocky mountains all day through")
6. Töltik a nagyerdő útját ("All the lads to war they’ve taken")
7. Eddig való dolgom a tavaszi szántás ("Spring begins with labour; then’s the time for sowing")
8. Olvad a hó, csárdás kis angyalom ("Snow is melting, oh, my dear, my darling")

=== BB 98 (Sz 92 / W 64) ===
Twenty Hungarian Folksongs, Vols. I–IV, for voice and piano (1929)

- Volume I Szomorú nóták – Sad Songs
1. A tömlöcben (In Prison)
2. Régi keserves (Old Lament)
3. Bujdosó ének (The Fugitive)
4. Pásztornóta (Herdsman’s Song)
- Volume II Táncdalok – Dancing Songs
5. Székely “lassú” Székely Slow Dance
6. Székely “friss” Székely Fast Dance
7. Kanásztánc Swineherd’s Dance
8. Hatforintos nóta Six-Florin Dance
- Volume III Vegyes dalok – Diverse Songs
9. Juhászcsúfoló [The Shepherd)
10. Tréfás nóta (Joking Song)
11. Párosító 1 (Nuptial Serenade 1)
12. Párosító 2 (Nuptial Serenade 2)
13. Pár-ének (Dialogue Song)
14. Panasz (Lament)
15. Bordal (Drinking Song)
- Volume IV Új dalok – New Style Songs
16. I. Allegro – Hej, édesanyám
17. II. Più allegro – Érik a ropogós cseresznye
18. III. Moderato – Már Dobozon régen leesett a hó
19. IV. Allegretto – Sárga kukoricaszár
20. V. Allegro non troppo – Búza, búza, búza

== Notable recordings ==
- Bartók Five Songs, Op. 16 (Text: Endre Ady) 8 Hungarian Folksongs, BB 47, Sz. 64 Nina Valery (mezzo-soprano), Rudolph Goehr (piano)
- Bartók & Kodály: Hungarian Folksongs. Terézia Csajbók and Lóránt Szűcs (Hungaroton Classics)
