= Fifteen Hungarian Peasant Songs =

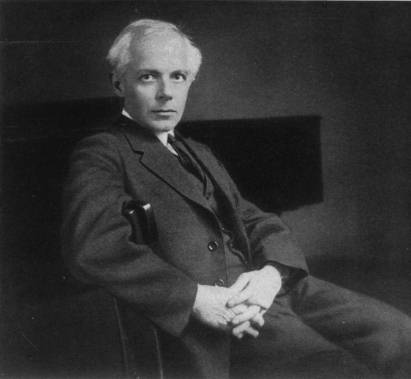
Béla Bartók in 1927

Fifteen Hungarian Peasant Songs, Sz. 71, BB 79 is a collection of short folk melodies arranged for piano by the Hungarian composer Béla Bartók. It was composed between 1914 and 1918. In 1933, Bartók adapted and orchestrated parts of the piece as Hungarian Peasant Songs, Sz. 100, BB 107, commonly known by its Hungarian name, Magyar parasztdalok ([ˈmɒɟɒr ˈpɒrɒstˌdɒlok]).

== Structure ==
The collection consists of fifteen movements, some of which are grouped together. A typical performance lasts 13–15 minutes. The movement list is as follows:

Four Old Tunes
1. Rubato
2. Andante – Poco sostenuto – Più andante (Tempo I) – Poco sostenuto – Più andante
3. Poco rubato – Sostenuto
4. Andante

5. Scherzo. Andante – Sostenuto, poco rubato – Tempo I
6. Ballad (Theme with variations). Andante – Più andante – Poco adagio – Più andante – Maestoso

Old Dance Tunes
7. Allegro
8. Allegretto
9. Allegretto
10. L'istesso tempo
11. Assai moderato
12. Allegretto
13. Poco più vivo – Allegretto
14. Allegro
15. Allegro – Più vivo – Poco più meno vivo

Some critics claim Bartók intended the work to be split into two parts: the first one would include the first six movements, and the second one would include the following nine movements. However, such division is not present in the original score.

== Orchestral version ==
In 1933, Bartók adapted and orchestrated movements 6-15 of the piano version of the piece as Hungarian Peasant Songs, Sz. 100, BB 107. While this version cuts the first five movements of the original and parts of the thirteenth, it also adds material, such as additional variations in movement 12. This version of the piece is commonly known by its Hungarian name, Magyar parasztdalok ([ˈmɒɟɒr ˈpɒrɒstˌdɒlok]).

=== Instrumentation ===
The work is scored for the following orchestra:

Woodwinds

2 flutes (2nd doubling piccolo)
2 oboes (2nd doubling English horn)
2 clarinets (2nd doubling bass clarinet)
2 bassoons

Brass

2 horns
2 trumpets
2 trombones
1 tuba

Percussion

timpani

bass drum

Strings

harp

violins I
violins II
violas
cellos
double basses

== Notable recordings ==
Notable recordings of Fifteen Hungarian Peasant Songs include:

Pianist	Record Company	Year of Recording	Format
András Schiff	Denon Records / Brilliant Classics	1980	CD
Sviatoslav Richter	Parnassus Records	1956	CD
