= Mária Basilides =

Hungarian opera singer (1886–1946)

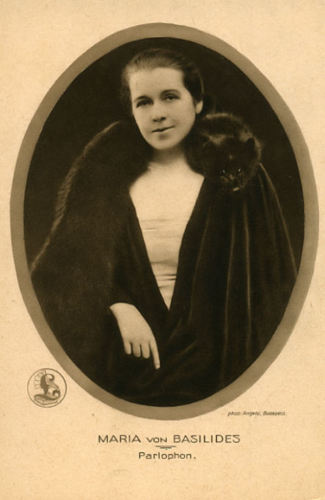
- Basilides, c. 1920

Background information
- Birth name: Basilides Mária Viola Matild
- Born: November 11, 1886; Jelšava, Kingdom of Hungary, Austria-Hungary
- Died: September 26, 1946 (aged 59); Budapest, Hungarian Republic
- Genres: Opera; oratorio; art song
- Occupation: Singer
- Instrument: Voice (contralto)
- Years active: 1911–1946
- Spouse: István Péterfi (married 1913)

Basilides Mária (Hungarian) or Mária Basilides (11 November 1886 – 26 September 1946) was a Hungarian contralto singer.

She was born in Jelšava on 11 November 1886, and studied at the Budapest Academy of Music.She married music critic Péterfi István.

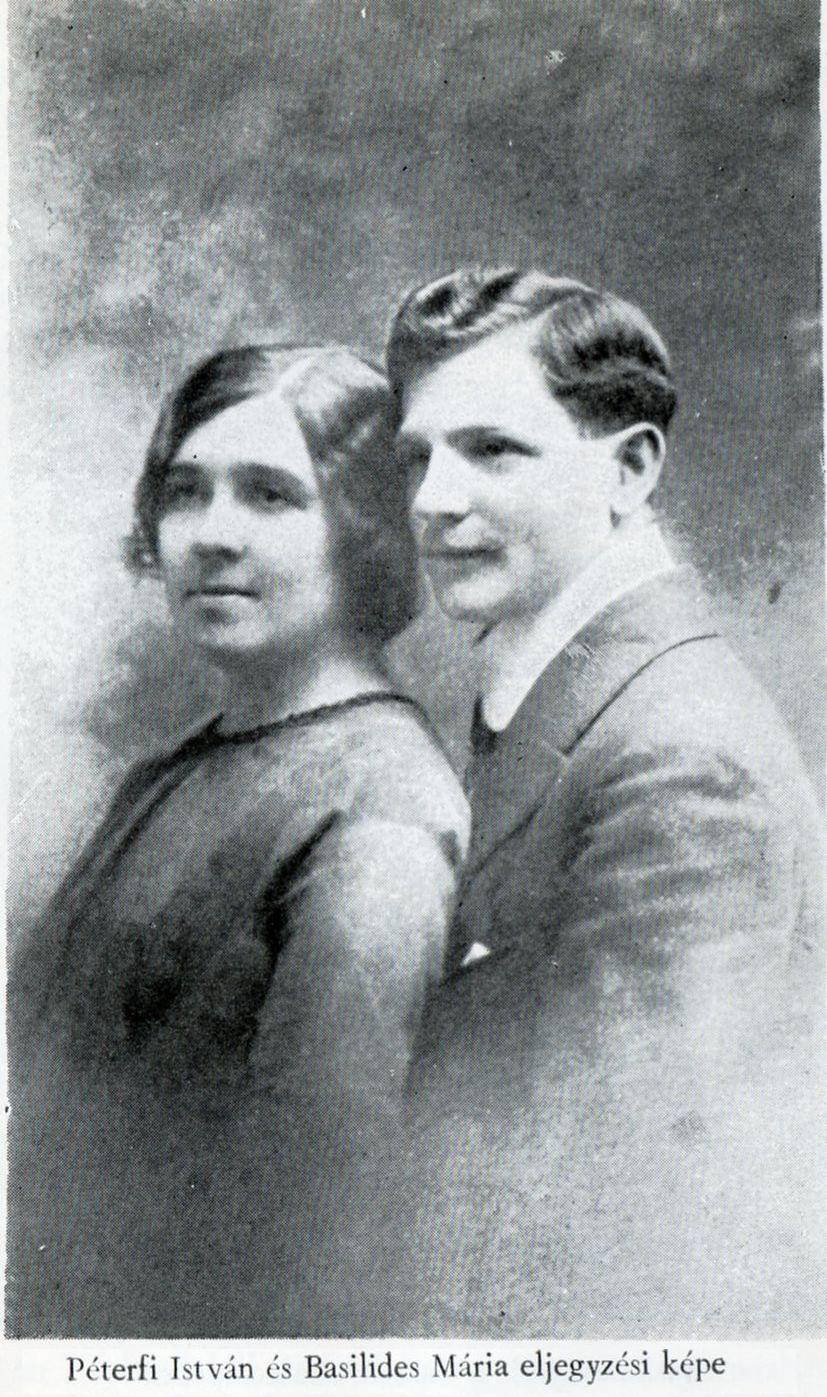
Engagement photograph of Basiilides and Péterfi, 1912 or 1913

She died in Budapest on 26 September 1946 and is buried in the Kerepesi Cemetery in Budapest.

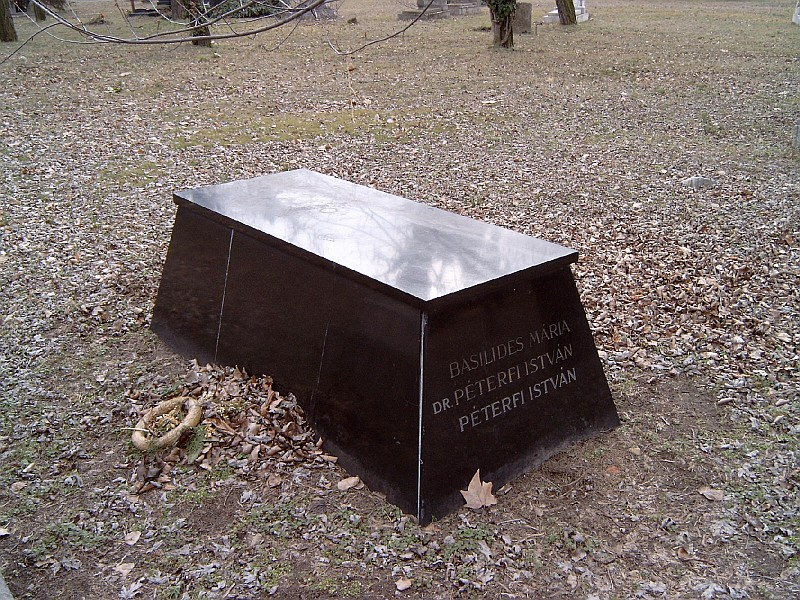
Basilides' tomb in Budapest
