= Four Dirges =

Hungarian song collection

- by Béla Bartók
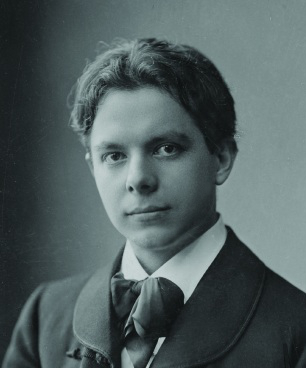
- Béla Bartók in 1903
- Native name: 4 siratóének
- Form: Dirges
- Composed: 1909–1910
- Performed: 1917: Budapest
- Published: 1912: Budapest
- Movements: 4
- Scoring: Solo piano

Four Dirges, Op. 9a, Sz. 45, BB 58 (Hungarian: 4 siratóének) is a short collection of dirges by Hungarian composer Béla Bartók.

== Composition ==
Béla Bartók had been researching folk songs for quite some time before the first realization of this composition in 1909. Since 1905, Bartók had been travelling around Eastern Europe, especially around Hungary and Romania, collecting folk songs and tunes which would later become some of the basis of a significant part of his production as a composer. It was especially in 1908 that Bartók started to become increasingly interested in the tonal aspect of his works, which started to show a distinctive flavor to that of other contemporary composers. Bartók composed these four short pieces for solo piano between 1909 and 1910. The set was never formally premiered and was initially published in 1912 by Rózsavölgyi & Társa in Budapest. It was only partially first performed in Budapest in 1917 by fellow pianist Ernő Dohnányi.

== Structure ==
The set consists of four short compositions for piano with varying tempo markings. However, all of the pieces in the set are characterised for being slow and pesante. The whole set takes around 8 minutes to perform:

1. Adagio
2. Andante
3. Poco lento
4. Assai andante

The texture of all four dirges is consistently simple and centered around octatonicism and pentatonic structures. The melodies are constructed on lydian and phrygian modes and are constantly accompanied by triads and open fifths.

== See also ==
- List of solo piano compositions by Béla Bartók
