= Sonatina (Bartók) =

1915 musical composition by Béla Bartók

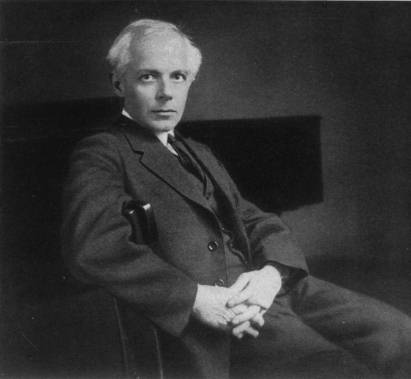
Béla Bartók in 1927

Sonatina, Sz. 55, BB. 69 is a piece for solo piano written in 1915 by Hungarian composer Béla Bartók. Initially entitled Sonatina on Romanian folk tunes, it is based on folk tunes Bartók collected in his neighbour country Romania, which, even though he proclaimed Hungarian folk music was clearly superior, was a direct source of inspiration all along his active years.

== Structure ==
Live performance

This sonatina consists of three movements and, according to Bartók's notes, takes 3 minutes 47 seconds to perform:

1. Dudások (Bagpipers). Allegretto
2. Medvetánc (Bear Dance). Moderato
3. Finale. Allegro vivace

Though Bartók arranged it in three movements, the piece actually consists of five different folk tunes: he used two in the first movement, in an A–B–A form, and two in the last movement, which he then combines snatches of in the coda. In a radio broadcast of the Sonatina in 1944, Bartók described the piece:

This sonatina was originally conceived as a group of Rumanian folk dances for piano. The three parts which Mrs. Bartók will play were selected from a group and given the title of Sonatina. The first movement, which is called "Bagpipers", is a dance – these are two dances played by two bagpipe players, the first by one and the second by another. The second movement is called "Bear Dance" – this was played for me by a peasant violinist on the G and D string, on the lower strings in order to have it more similar to a bear’s voice. Generally the violin players use the E string. And the last movement contains also two folk melodies played by peasant violin players.

Bartók arranged this piece for orchestra sixteen years later. He called the orchestral version Transylvanian Dances, Sz. 96, BB 102.

== Notable recordings ==
Notable recordings of this composition include:

- Jenő Jandó, Naxos Records CD (2005)
