= Three Hungarian Folktunes =

Hungarian piano folksongs

- by Béla Bartók
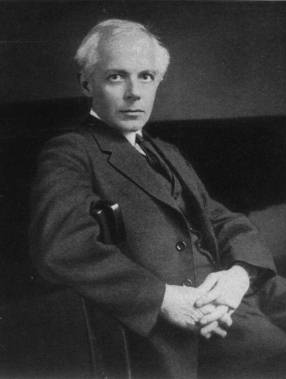
- Béla Bartók in 1927
- Native name: Három magyar népdal
- Catalogue: Sz. 66; BB 80b
- Composed: 1914–1918
- Published: 1942
- Movements: 3
- Scoring: Piano

Three Hungarian Folksongs, Sz. 66, BB 80b (Hungarian: Három magyar népdal) is a collection of folksongs for piano by Hungarian composer Béla Bartók. It was composed between 1914 and 1918.

== Composition ==
While there is some speculation about its exact date of composition, some of the most reliable sources suggest it was written between 1914 and 1918, in a period when Bartók was deeply fascinated by folk music from Romania and his native Hungary. Many of the small compositions he wrote when collecting folk music all around these countries were either lost or revamped into later works, and some would never see the light of publication.

This set was presumably revised three decades later, between 1941 and 1942. After moving to the United States, Bartók lived in near-poverty, due to the limited income generated by his music. However, one of his main sources of income was to publish old manuscripts. The set was published by Boosey & Hawkes in 1942.

== Structure ==
The set consists of three short folk tunes. It has a duration of 4 minutes, each movement lasting for about 1 minute. The movement list is as follows:

1. The Peacock. Andante tranquillo, rubato
2. At the Janoshida Fairground. Allegro non troppo, un poco rubato
3. White Lily. Maestoso
