= Music of Transylvania =

Transylvania, a historical province in present-day Romania, has been historically and culturally more closely linked to Central Europe than Southeastern Europe, and its music reflects those influences. Inhabited by Romanians, Székelys and other Hungarians, Germans, Serbs, Slovaks, Gypsies, and others, Transylvania has long been a center for folk music from all of these different cultures. Bartók and Kodály collected many folk songs from Transylvania early in the 20th century. Kodály's Székelyfonó (The Spinning Room) uses folk tunes from the area. In our days, Deep Forest included folk songs from Transylvania on their albums.

Violin, kontra and double bass, sometimes with a cimbalom, are the most integral ensemble unit. They are used to play a wide variety of songs, including numerous kinds of specific wedding songs.

Hungarians from Transylvania, which make up around 20% of the population of the region, are known for their vibrant musical cultures, famous examples being hajnali songs and legényes (young men's dance). In fact, Transylvania was an important center for Hungarian music in the 16th century because at that time it was the only independent Hungarian province not occupied by the Ottoman Empire.

Drum, guitar, and violin make up the typical band in Maramureș, and virtuoso fiddlers are also popular in the area. At the end of the 1990s, the Maramusical music festival was organized in Botiza to draw attention to the Romanian music of the area.

== See also ==
- Music of Romania
- Music of Hungary
- Palatka Gypsy Band
- Kontra
