= Contrasts (Bartók) =

1938 composition by Béla Bartók

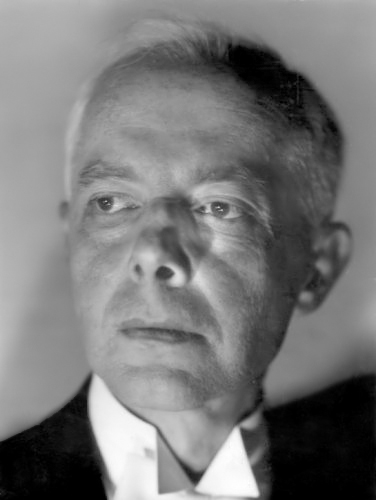
Contrasts was composed by Béla Bartók (pictured) under commission from Benny Goodman

Contrasts (Sz. 111, BB 116) is a 1938 composition scored for clarinet–violin–piano trio by Béla Bartók (1881–1945). It is based on Hungarian and Romanian dance melodies and has three movements with a combined duration of 17–20 minutes. Bartók wrote the work in response to a letter from violinist Joseph Szigeti, although it was officially commissioned by clarinetist Benny Goodman. The three made the first recording of the piece in 1940, released on a Columbia Masterworks 78 rpm album.

== Structure ==
The work is in three movements:

1. Verbunkos (Recruiting Dance)
2. Pihenő (Relaxation)
3. Sebes (Fast Dance)

The movements contrast in tempo. The first movement contains a cadenza for clarinet and the last one for violin. The piece features examples of alternate or dual-thirds (C and C♯ in an A triad):

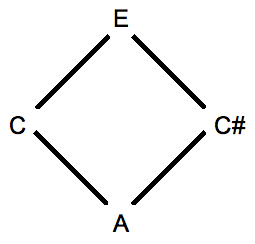

This mixed thirds structure may be thought of as bitonal in that the major and minor third of a triad are used. This structure may be extended through considering each third of the original triad as also being a possible third in a triad a half step in either direction. Thus C♯/D♭ is a major third in an A major triad and the minor third of a B♭ major triad:

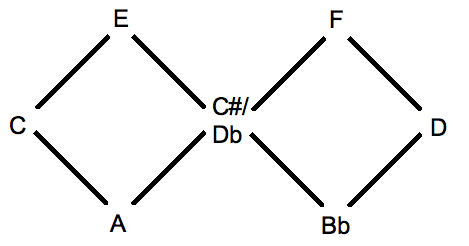

Various Hungarian and Romanian dance melodies are incorporated into the work. The first movement begins with a lively violin pizzicato, after which the clarinet introduces the main theme, which is then varied. This theme is an example of the Hungarian dance and music genre "verbunkos", or recruiting dance. The genre of music was commonly played at military recruitings. The second movement is much more introspective and has a continuously shifting mood without a defined theme. The third is a frenzied dance that begins with a scordatura (G♯–D–A–E♭) violin section, after which the clarinet introduces the main theme. In the middle, there is a slower section in the time signature 3+2+3+2+3/8, after which the pattern of variations on the theme is resumed.

János Kárpáti has discussed the structural aspects of Contrasts in detail. Szigeti recalled that Bartók had told him that the start of Contrasts had partial inspiration from the "Blues" second movement of Maurice Ravel's Sonata for Violin and Piano. F. Bónis has further noted the parallel between a short passage in the same Ravel movement and a passage in the first movement of Contrasts.

== Movements ==
=== I. Verbunkos ===
"Verbunkos" features polymodality or what Kárpáti terms alternative structures. For example, the framing motif of the first movement features, in relation to the root, A, the minor and major third and the perfect and diminished fifth:

E♭ is revealed as both an alternative fifth of an A chord and the alternative third of a C chord by the canon at the third at the beginning of the development, bar 58:

Between the six notes of both triads are seven thirds.

Verbunkos was a stately and stylized Hungarian Recruiting Dance "measured in rhythm and rich in melodic embellishments characterized by the theme":

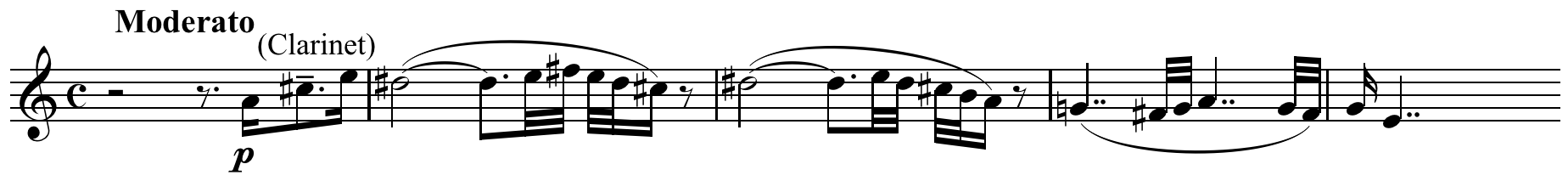

=== II. Pihenő ===
This movement has been described as volcanic rather than relaxing, despite its title, "relaxation" or "rest".

=== III. Sebes ===
Contrasts - Sebes à 13 temps (0:46)
Recorded in 1940

The violinist must retune (scordatura) two strings for the last movement, lowering the E and raising the G a semitone each. Often, rather than retuning mid-performance, the violinist will keep a second instrument to hand for the beginning of the movement, switching back after the opening.

The trio of this movement features "Bulgarian Rhythm" and is similar in spirit to the Finale of the first Violin Sonata:

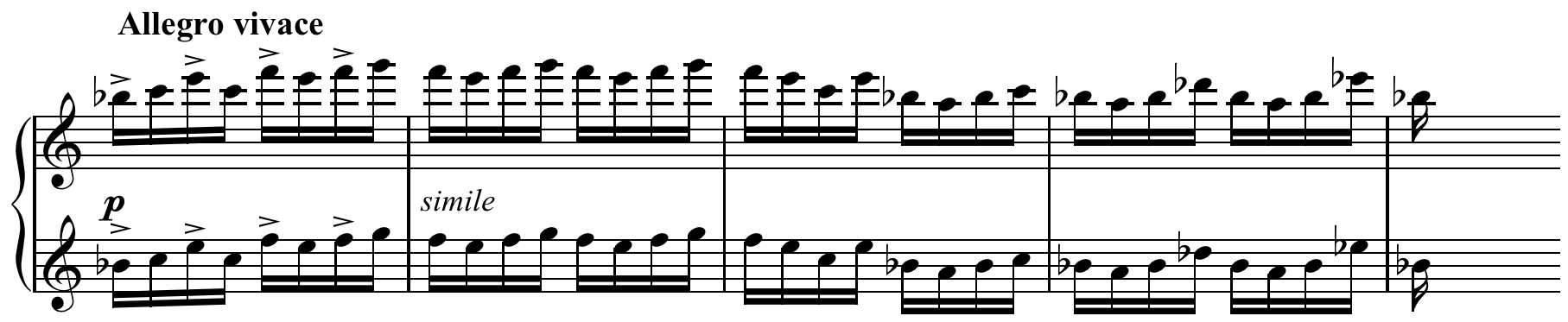

== Reception ==
The work is said by Kárpáti to have "technical bravura and at the same time...poetic versatility". In contrast, E.R., assumes that appreciation of the work suffers from its "lack of variety of mood" though "Bartók's genius consists in gifts of rhetoric so rich that he can spread this one mood, and spread it interestingly, over a score or more of large-scale works". He argues that the "contrasts" in the piece are "of speed rather than of mood."

Seiber considers it "a less weighty, less important work in Bartók's whole œuvre" though the "writing for both violin and clarinet" is "most effective throughout". An article describing a program in which "the standard note on Bartók's Contrasts...was replaced by a sequential, diagrammatic sketch," concluded that, "in fact, Bartók looks as inscrutable as he sounds".

== Sources ==
- Bónis, F. (1963). "Quotations in Bartók's Music. A Contribution to Bartók's Psychology of Composition". Studia Musicologica Academiae Scientiarum Hungaricae. T. 5 (Fasc. 1/4): 355–382. doi:10.2307/901555. JSTOR 901555.
- Bradshaw, Susan (2001). "Piano music: recital repertoire and chamber music", Cambridge Companion to Bartók, p. 116. Amanda Bayley, ed. ISBN 0-521-66958-8.
- Kárpáti, János (1981). "Alternative Structures in Bartók's Contrasts". Studia Musicologica Academiae Scientiarum Hungaricae. T. 23 (Fasc. 1/4): 201–207. JSTOR 902112. Centenrio Belae Bartók Sacrum#.
- E. R. (1943) ."Review: Contrasts, for Violin, Clarinet and Piano by Béla Bartók", Music & Letters, Vol. 24, No. 1. (January 1943), p. 61.
- Seiber, Mátyás (1949). "Béla Bartók's Chamber Music", Tempo, New Ser., No. 13, Bartók Number. (Autumn, 1949), pp. 19–31.
