= For Children =

Set of piano pieces by Béla Bartók

- Piano music by Béla Bartók
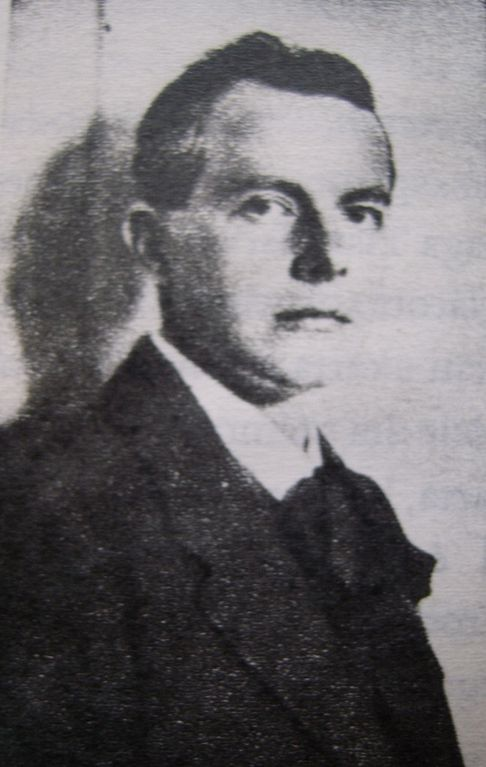
- Béla Bartók (1881–1945) at the composition time
- Native name: Gyermekeknek
- Year: 1908 and 1909

For Children (Hungarian: Gyermekeknek) is a set of short piano pieces composed by Béla Bartók in 1908 and 1909; 85 pieces were originally issued in four volumes. Each piece is based on a folk tune: Hungarian in the first two volumes (42 pieces), Slovak in the last two (43 pieces). In 1945, Bartók revised the set, removing six pieces that were inaccurately transcribed or had been found not to be original folk tunes, and substantially changing the harmonization of a number of others; the collection, now of 79 pieces, was reissued in two volumes (of 40 and 39 pieces).

The pieces were written for students to play, and progress slightly in difficulty through each half of the collection. In modern times, some concert pianists (notably Zoltán Kocsis) had begun including some of them on their recital programs, citing their musical value even apart from their pedagogical origins.

== Contents ==
The final, revised version of For Children is divided into two volumes:

Volume I

1. Játszó gyermekek (Children at Play). Allegro
2. Gyermekdal (Children's Song). Andante
3. Quasi adagio
4. Párnatánc (Pillow Dance). Allegro
5. Játék (Play). Allegretto
6. Balkéztanulmány (Study for the Left Hand). Allegro
7. Játékdal (Play Song). Andante grazioso
8. Gyermekjáték (Children's Game). Allegretto
9. Dal (Song). Adagio
10. Gyermektánc (Children's Dance). Allegro molto
11. Lento
12. Allegro
13. Ballada (Ballad). Andante
14. Allegretto
15. Allegro moderato
16. Régi magyar dallam (Old Hungarian Tune). Andante rubato
17. Körtánc (Round Dance). Lento
18. Katonadal (Soldier's Song). Andante non troppo
19. Allegretto
20. Bordal (Drinking Song). Allegro
21. Allegro robusto
22. Allegretto
23. Táncdal (Dance Song). Allegro grazioso
24. Andante sostenuto
25. Parlando
26. Moderato
27. Tréfa (Jest). Allegramente
28. Kórusdal (Choral). Andante
29. Ötfokú dallam (Pentatonic Tune). Allegro scherzando
30. Gúnydal (Jeering Song). Allegro ironico
31. Andante tranquillo — attacca
32. Andante
33. Allegro non troppo
34. Allegretto
35. Con moto
36. Részegek nótája (Drunkard's Song). Vivace
37. Kanásznóta (Swine-herd's Song). Allegro
38. Regös ének (Winter Solstice Song). Molto vivace
39. Allegro moderato
40. Kanásztánc (Swine-herd's Dance). Allegro vivace

Volume II

1. Allegro
2. Andante
3. Allegretto
4. Lakodalmas (Wedding Song). Andante
5. Változatok (Variations). Molto andante — A tempo — A tempo — L'istesso tempo
6. I. Körtánc (Round Dance I). Allegro
7. Bánat (Sorrow). Andante
8. Táncdal (Dance). Allegro non troppo
9. II. Körtánc (Round Dance II). Andante
10. Temetésre szól az ének (Funeral Song). Largo
11. Lento — attacca
12. Andante rubato — attacca
13. Allegro
14. Moderato
15. I. Dudanóta (Bagpipe I). Molto tranquillo
16. Panasz (Lament). Lento
17. Andante
18. Gúnydal (Teasing Song). Sostenuto
19. Románc (Romance). Assai lento
20. Kerget dzés (Game of Tag). Presto
21. Tréfa (Pleasantry). Allegro moderato
22. Duhajkodó (Revelry). Molto allegro
23. Andante tranquillo - attacca
24. Andante
25. Scherzando. Allegretto
26. Furulyaszó (Peasant's Flute). Andante, molto rubato
27. Még egy tréfa (Pleasantry II). Allegro
28. Andante, molto rubato
29. Kánon (Canon). Allegro non troppo
30. Szól a duda (Bagpipe II). Vivace
31. Betyárnóta (The Highway Robber). Allegro
32. Pesante
33. Andante tranquillo
34. Búcsú (Farewell). Adagio
35. Ballada (Ballad). Moderato
36. -
37. Rapszódia (Rhapsody). Parlando, molto rubato
38. Siratóének (Dirge). Lento
39. Halotti ének (Mourning Song). Lento

== See also ==
Mikrokosmos

- An interactive score of Bartók’s For Children no. 25 with Sir András Schiff.
- An interactive score of Bartók’s For Children no. 31 with Sir András Schiff.
- An interactive score of Bartók’s For Children no. 35 with Sir András Schiff.
