= Piano Sonata (Bartók) =

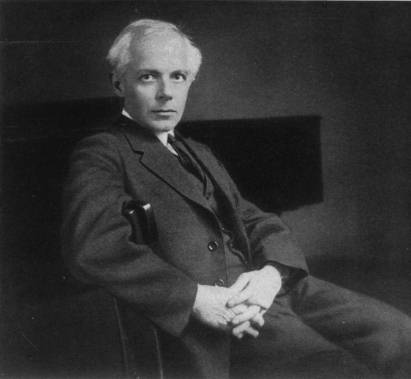
Béla Bartók in 1927

The Piano Sonata, BB 88, Sz. 80, is a piano sonata by Hungarian composer Béla Bartók, composed in June 1926. 1926 is known to musicologists as Bartók's "piano year", when he underwent a creative shift in part from Beethovenian intensity to a more Bachian craftsmanship.

== Movements ==
The work is in three movements, with the following tempo indications:

1. Allegro moderato
2. Sostenuto e pesante
3. Allegro molto

It is tonal but highly dissonant (and has no key signature), using the piano in a percussive fashion with changing time signatures. Underneath clusters of repeated notes, the melody is folklike. Each movement has a classical structure overall, in character with Bartók's frequent use of classical forms as vehicles for his most advanced thinking. Musicologist Halsey Stevens finds in the work early forms of many stylistic traits that became more fully developed in Bartók's "golden age", 1934–1940.

== Writing ==
Bartók wrote Dittának, Budapesten, 1926, jun. at the end of the score, dedicating it to Ditta Pásztory-Bartók, his second wife. A performance generally lasts around 15 minutes. Bartók wrote the duration as around 12 minutes and 30 seconds on the score.

Bartok wrote this piece with an Imperial Bösendorfer in mind, which has extra keys in the bass (97 keys in total). The second movement calls for these keys to be used (to play G♯_{0} and F_{0}).

Bartók had previously written a piano sonata in 1896, which is little known.
