= László Somfai =

Hungarian musicologist (1934–2026)

László Somfai (15 August 1934 – 11 February 2026) was a Hungarian musicologist.

== Life and career ==
Somfai was born in Jászladány on 15 August 1934. He first studied History of Music, graduating in 1959 with a dissertation on the classical string quartet idiom of Joseph Haydn. He went on to earn a PhD in musicology.

He was a professor at the Franz Liszt Academy of Music, specializing in classical style, Haydn, and Béla Bartók. He also taught at the City University of New York and the University of California, Berkeley.

Among his work is the BB catalogue of Bartók's compositions.

Somfai died on 11 February 2026, at the age of 91.
