= András Szőllősy =

Hungarian composer

András Szőllősy (Hungarian: [ˈɒndraːʃ ˈsøːlløːʃi]; 27 February 1921 – 6 December 2007) was a Hungarian composer and musicologist; as the latter, known for the Szőllősy index (abbreviated "Sz."), a frequently used index of the works of Béla Bartók.

Szőllősy studied composition under Zoltán Kodály at the Franz Liszt Academy of Music where he was a professor of music history and theory from 1950 until his death. He was awarded a Ph.D. from the University of Budapest.

He won numerous prizes and awards for his own compositions, including Distinguished Composition of the Year 1970 at UNESCO's International Rostrum of Composers in Paris for Concerto No. 3 for sixteen strings, and the 1971 Erkel Prize. In 1985 he won the Kossuth Prize – the highest official recognition of the Hungarian state – and in 1987 he was proclaimed Commandeur of the Ordre des Arts et des Lettres by the French government. He became a member of the Széchenyi Academy of Literature and Arts in 1993 and was awarded the Széchenyi Prize in 1997.

Szöllősy's musicological writings include books on Bartók, Kodály, and Arthur Honegger. The Szőllősy index includes all of Bartók's compositions as well as his musicological writings. For instance, Concerto for Orchestra is Sz. 116 and Music for Strings, Percussion and Celesta is Sz. 106.
