= James Ehnes =

Canadian violinist and violist (born 1976)

James Ehnes CM OM FRSC
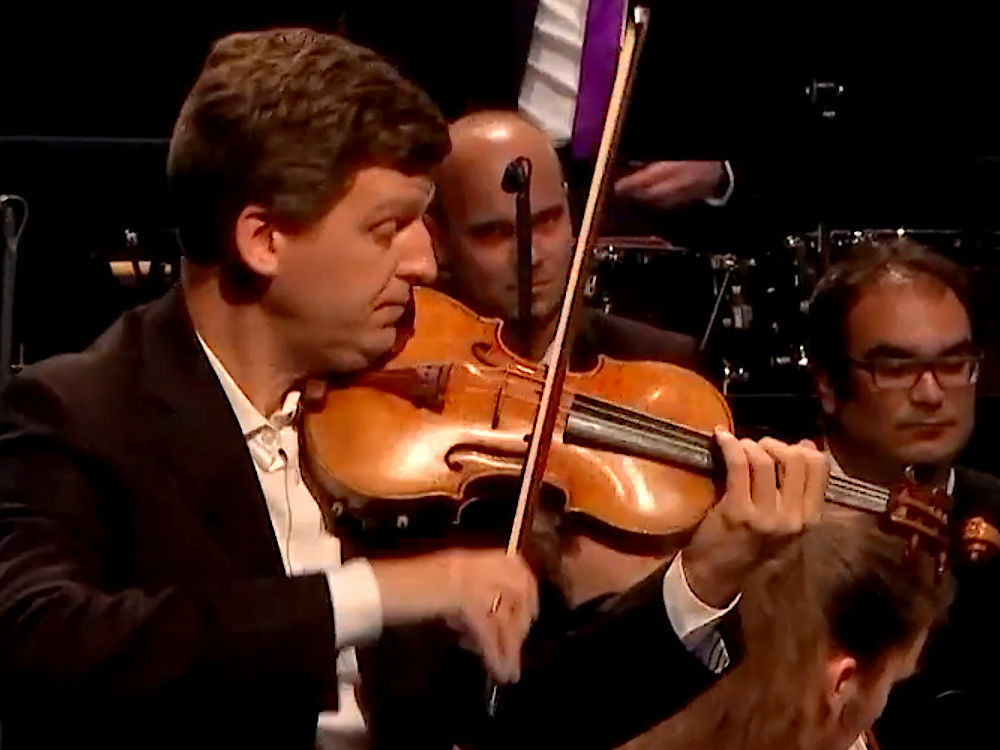

Background information
- Born: January 27, 1976 (age 50); Brandon, Manitoba, Canada
- Genres: Classical; chamber music
- Instruments: Violin, Viola
- Member of: Ehnes Quartet
- Website: jamesehnes.com

James Ehnes CM OM FRSC /ˈɛnɪs/ (born January 27, 1976) is a Canadian-American Grammy-winning concert violinist and violist.

== Early life ==
Ehnes was born in Brandon, Manitoba, the son of Alan Ehnes, long time trumpet professor at Brandon University (Canada), and Barbara Withey Ehnes, former ballerina with Les Grands Ballets Canadiens, Ruth Page's International Ballet, and Chicago Ballet, and former director of the Brandon School of Dance. Ehnes began violin studies at the age of five and at age nine became a protégé of the noted Canadian violinist Francis Chaplin. He studied with Sally Thomas at the Meadowmount School of Music and from 1993 to 1997 at The Juilliard School, winning the Peter Mennin Prize for Outstanding Achievement and Leadership in Music upon his graduation.

James Ehnes toured with Jeunesses Musicales Canada during the 1992–1993 season, when he was only 16 years old.

== Career ==
Ehnes has performed with all of the major orchestras in North America including the New York Philharmonic Orchestra, the Chicago Symphony Orchestra, the Boston Symphony Orchestra, the Philadelphia Orchestra, the Cleveland Orchestra, the Los Angeles Philharmonic Orchestra, the San Francisco Symphony, the Saint Louis Symphony Orchestra, the Seattle Symphony and the Indianapolis Symphony Orchestra in the U.S., as well as the Toronto Symphony Orchestra, the Montreal Symphony Orchestra, the Vancouver Symphony Orchestra, and the National Arts Centre Orchestra in Canada.

In Europe he has performed as soloist with the Royal Concertgebouw Orchestra, the Gewandhausorchester Leipzig, the London Symphony Orchestra, London's Philharmonia Orchestra, the London Philharmonic, the BBC Symphony Orchestra, the BBC Philharmonic, the Royal Scottish National Orchestra, the Royal Liverpool Philharmonic, the Ulster Orchestra, the Munich Philharmonic, the Deutsche Kammerphilharmonie, the Orchestre National de Lyon, the Czech Philharmonic Orchestra, the Budapest Festival Orchestra, the Tonhalle-Orchester Zürich, and the Finnish Radio Symphony Orchestra, plus many others.

In October 2005, he was awarded a Doctor of Music degree (honoris causa) from Brandon University and in July 2007 he became the youngest person ever elected as a Fellow of the Royal Society of Canada. In 2010, he was made a Member of the Order of Canada.

Ehnes performs on the 1715 "ex-Marsick" Stradivarius. His commercial recordings have won many awards and prizes, including 11 Junos, two Grammies, and two Gramophone Classical Music Awards - 2008 Best Concerto for Edward Elgar's Violin Concerto - 2021 Artist of the Year.

Ehnes was awarded the 2017 Royal Philharmonic Society Music Awards in the Instrumentalist category.

Ehnes joined the Royal Academy of Music as visiting professor of violin in 2017.

Ehnes joined The Indiana University Jacobs School of Music faculty as a professor of practice in violin as of August 1, 2024.

Ehnes is artistic director of the Seattle Chamber Music Society. He and violinist Amy Schwartz Moretti, violist Che-Yen Chen, and cellist Edward Arron perform as the Ehnes Quartet.

== Personal life ==
Ehnes lives in Ellenton, Florida with his wife and two children.

In a 2009 interview, they asked "Living in Florida, do you have American citizenship?" Ehnes said "I have dual. My parents are Americans. When they moved to Brandon, Manitoba in 1973, they never expected to stay. But it was a great place to live, so they’ve been there ever since."

== Discography ==
=== James Ehnes ===
- 1995 Niccolò Paganini: 24 Caprices for Solo Violin
- 2000 Sergei Prokofiev: Violin Sonata No. 1 | Violin Sonata No. 2 | Five Melodies
- 2000 Maurice Ravel: Violin Sonata No. 2 | Tzigane | Berceuse sur le nom de Gabriel Fauré, Claude Debussy: Violin Sonata, Camille Saint-Saëns: Violin Sonata No. 1
- 2000 Johann Sebastian Bach: The Six Sonatas & Partitas for Solo Violin
- 2000 French Showpieces - Camille Saint-Saëns: Introduction and Rondo Capriccioso | Havanaise, Hector Berlioz: Le corsaire | Rêverie et caprice, Ernest Chausson: Poème, Claude Debussy: Tarantelle styrienne, Darius Milhaud: Cinéma Fantaisie, Jules Massenet: Méditation from the opera Thaïs
- 2001 Max Bruch: Violin Concertos Nos. 1 & 3
- 2002 Bruch: Concerto No. 2 and Scottish Fantasy
- 2002 Fritz Kreisler - Track 20. Petite Valse (Piano Solo: James Ehnes)
- 2003 Robert Schumann: Piano Quintet, Gabriel Fauré: Piano Quintet No. 2
- 2004 Romantic Pieces
- 2004 Henryk Wieniawski | Pablo de Sarasate
- 2004 Johann Nepomuk Hummel: Op. 94, Potpourri for Viola and Orchestra / Adagio and Rondo alla Polacca for Violin and Orchestra / Violin Concerto in G major
- 2004 Ernő Dohnányi: Violin Concerto No. 2, Op. 43
- 2004 Luigi Dallapiccola: Tartiniana (Divertimento for Violin and Orchestra)
- 2005 John Adams: Road Movies for violin and piano, Hallelujah Junction for two pianos (Piano: Andrew Russo, James Ehnes)
- 2005 Antonín Dvořák: Violin Concerto
- 2005 Bach: Sonatas for Violin and Harpsichord Vol.1
- 2006 Bach: Sonatas for Violin and Harpsichord Vol.2
- 2006 Wolfgang Amadeus Mozart: Violin Concertos 1-5
- 2006 Samuel Barber, Erich Wolfgang Korngold, William Walton: Violin Concertos - Vancouver Symphony Orchestra, Bramwell Tovey (50th Annual Grammy Awards - Best Instrumental Soloist(s) Performance (with orchestra))
- 2007 Paul Schoenfield: Four Souvenirs for violin and piano, Café Music for piano trio
- 2007 Edward Elgar: Violin Concerto (2008 Gramophone Classical Music Awards - Best Concerto)
- 2009 Homage
- 2009 Niccolò Paganini: 24 Caprices for Solo Violin.
- 2010 Felix Mendelssohn: Violin Concerto, Octet
- 2011 Béla Bartók: Violin Concerto No. 1 | Violin Concerto No. 2 | Viola Concerto
- 2011 Pyotr Ilyich Tchaikovsky: Violin Concerto | Sérénade mélancolique | Valse-Scherzo | Souvenir d'un lieu cher (I. Méditation - II. Scherzo - III. Mélodie)
- 2012 Bartók: Works for Violin and Piano, Vol. 1 - Rhapsody Folk Dances No. 1 | Rhapsody Folk Dances No. 2 | Violin Sonata No. 1 | Violin Sonata No. 2 | Andante
- 2012 Tchaikovsky: The Sleeping Beauty - Bergen Philharmonic Orchestra, Neeme Järvi
- 2013 Bartók: Works for Violin and Piano, Vol. 2 - Sonata for Solo Violin | Violin Sonata in E minor | Romanian Folk Dances | Hungarian Folksongs | Hungarian Folk Tunes
- 2013 Benjamin Britten: Violin Concerto | Dmitri Shostakovich: Violin Concerto No. 1
- 2013 Prokofiev: Complete Works for Violin - Violin Concerto No. 1 | Violin Concerto No. 2 | Violin Sonata No. 1 | Violin Sonata No. 2 | Sonata for Two Violins | Sonata for Solo Violin | Five Melodies
- 2013 Tchaikovsky: Swan Lake - Bergen Philharmonic Orchestra, Neeme Järvi
- 2014 Aram Khachaturian: Violin Concerto | Shostakovich: String Quartet No. 7, String Quartet No. 8
- 2014 Bartók: Works for Violin and Piano, Vol. 3 - Contrasts for Violin, Clarinet, and Piano | Sonatina (Transcription for Violin and Piano) | 44 Duos for Two Violins
- 2014 American Chamber Music: Aaron Copland | Charles Ives | Leonard Bernstein | Elliott Carter | Samuel Barber
- 2015 Hector Berlioz: Reverie et Caprice, Op. 8 (violin) | Harold en Italie, Op. 16 (viola)
- 2015 Cesar Franck and Richard Strauss: Violin Sonatas
- 2015 Leoš Janáček: The Wandering of a Little Soul (Violin Concerto)
- 2015 Aaron Jay Kernis: 2 Movements (with Bells)
- 2015 The Essential James Ehnes (containing works by Bach, Kreisler, Prokofiev, Dvorak, Saint-Saens, and Berlioz)
- 2015 Antonio Vivaldi: The Four Seasons | Giuseppe Tartini: The Devil's Trill | Jean-Marie Leclair: Violin Sonata, Op. 9 No. 3
- 2016 Claude Debussy: Violin Sonata | Edward Elgar: Violin Sonata | Ottorino Respighi: Violin Sonata in B minor | Jean Sibelius: 10 Pensées lyriques, Op. 40: 5. Berceuse
- 2017 Ludwig van Beethoven: Violin Sonata No. 9 | Violin Sonata No. 6
- 2017 Beethoven: Violin Concerto | Romance no. 1 Op. 40 | Romance no. 2 Op. 50, Franz Schubert: Rondo in A major for Violin and Strings, D 438
- 2017 Bartók: Rhapsody Folk Dances No. 1 | Rhapsody Folk Dances No. 2 (Violin and Orchestra)
- 2018 William Walton: Viola Concerto
- 2018 Ralph Vaughan Williams: The Lark Ascending
- 2018 James Newton Howard: Violin Concerto, Aaron Jay Kernis: Violin Concerto, Bramwell Tovey: Stream of Limelight (61st Annual Grammy Awards - Best Classical Instrumental Solo)
- 2019 Richard Strauss: Violin Concerto
- 2019 James Newton Howard: A Hidden Life (Original Motion Picture Soundtrack)
- 2019 Beethoven: Op. 12 Violin Sonata No. 1 | Violin Sonata No. 2 | Violin Sonata No. 3, Variations on Se vuol ballare from Mozart's The Marriage of Figaro
- 2020 Beethoven: Violin Sonata No. 4 | Violin Sonata No. 5 | Violin Sonata No. 8, Six German Dances, Rondo in G Major
- 2020 Beethoven: Violin Sonata No. 7 | Violin Sonata No. 10
- 2020 Bach & Brahms Reimagined - Johannes Brahms: Horn Trio, Bach: Brandenburg Concerto No. 2, Brandenburg Concerto No. 5
- 2021 Eugène Ysaÿe: Six Sonatas for solo violin
- 2021 Bach: Sonatas and Partitas for Solo Violin
- 2022 Alban Berg: Violin Concerto
- 2023 Carl Nielsen: Violin Concerto
- 2023 Karol Szymanowski: Myths | George Frideric Handel: Violin sonata in D major (HWV 371) | James Newton Howard: 133...At Least | Tchaikovsky: Twelve Pieces Op. 40–6, Chanson sans paroles | Josef Suk: 4 Pieces for Violin and Piano Op. 17–4, Burleska | Samuel Dushkin: Sicilienne | Nikolai Rimsky-Korsakov: Flight of the Bumblebee | Manuel Ponce: Estrellita | Percy Grainger: Molly on the Shore
- 2024 Igor Stravinsky: Violin Concerto
- 2024 Erich Wolfgang Korngold: Violin Concerto (2022 concert) National Arts Centre Orchestra, Alexander Shelley
- 2024 Leonard Bernstein: Serenade after Plato's "Symposium" | John Williams: Violin Concerto No. 1 - St. Louis Symphony Orchestra, Stéphane Denève
- 2024 Jean Sibelius: Works for Violin and Orchestra - Violin Concerto | Six Humoresques | Two Serious Melodies | Two Serenades | Suite for Violin and String Orchestra - Bergen Philharmonic Orchestra, Edward Gardner (Chandos, CHSA 5267)
- 2024 Ehnes & Armstrong Play Brahms & Schumann - Robert Schumann: Märchenbilder, Johannes Brahms: Clarinet Sonatas Op. 120 No. 1, No. 2 (Version for Viola) | Wiegenlied - James Ehnes (viola), Andrew Armstrong (piano) (Onyx Classics, ONYX4256)
- 2025 Édouard Lalo: Symphonie espagnole | Camille Saint-Saëns: Violin Concerto No. 3 | Pablo de Sarasate: Carmen Fantasy - BBC Philharmonic, Juanjo Mena (Chandos, CHAN 20333)
- 2025 Johann Sebastian Bach: The Complete Violin Concertos - BWV 1042, BWV 1044, BWV 1060, BWV 1052, BWV 1041, BWV 1043, BWV 1056, BWV 1064 - National Arts Centre Orchestra (Analekta, AN28893-4)

=== Ehnes Quartet ===
- 2016 Franz Schubert: String Quartet No. 14 in D minor, D. 810, Jean Sibelius: String Quartet in D minor
- 2021 Beethoven: String Quartet No. 13 | Grosse Fuge
- 2021 Beethoven: String Quartet No. 12 | String Quartet No. 14
- 2021 Beethoven: String Quartet No. 10 | String Quartet No. 11
- 2022 Beethoven: String Quartet No. 15 | String Quartet No. 16

== See also ==
- List of Canadian musicians
- List of contemporary classical violinists
