= Beethoven's violin sonatas =

Ludwig van Beethoven composed the following violin sonatas between 1797 and 1812. He specifically designated them to be "Sonaten für Pianoforte und Violine", or "sonatas for piano and violin," as opposed to "violin sonatas", and they are published as such.

- Violin Sonata in A major (Beethoven), Hess 46 (fragmentary)
- Violin Sonata No. 1 in D, Op. 12, No. 1
- Violin Sonata No. 2 in A, Op. 12, No. 2
- Violin Sonata No. 3 in E-flat, Op. 12, No. 3
- Violin Sonata No. 4 in A minor, Op. 23
- Violin Sonata No. 5 in F, Op. 24 ("Spring")
- Violin Sonata No. 6 in A, Op. 30, No. 1
- Violin Sonata No. 7 in C minor, Op. 30, No. 2
- Violin Sonata No. 8 in G, Op. 30, No. 3
- Violin Sonata No. 9 in A, Op. 47 ("Kreutzer")
- Violin Sonata No. 10 in G, Op. 96
