= Op. 12 =

In music, Op. 12 stands for Opus number 12. Compositions that are assigned this number include:

- Adès – Arcadiana
- Barber – Essay for Orchestra
- Beethoven – Violin Sonata No. 1
- Beethoven – Violin Sonata No. 2
- Beethoven – Violin Sonata No. 3
- Braunfels – Prinzessin Brambilla
- Dvořák – String Quartet No. 6
- Elgar – Salut d'Amour
- Korngold – Die tote Stadt
- Larsson – Little Serenade (Liten serenad), suite for strings (1934)
- Luigini – Ballet égyptien
- Mendelssohn – String Quartet No. 1
- Nielsen – Hymnus amoris
- Pierné – Piano Concerto
- Rachmaninoff – Caprice bohémien
- Saint-Saëns – Oratorio de Noël
- Schumann – Fantasiestücke, Op. 12
- Sibelius – Piano Sonata in F major (1893)
- Vivaldi – Six Violin Concertos, Op. 12
- Ysaÿe – Poème élégiaque in D minor, Op.12
