= Two Serenades =

Six concertante pieces by Jean Sibelius

- Concertante pieces by Jean Sibelius
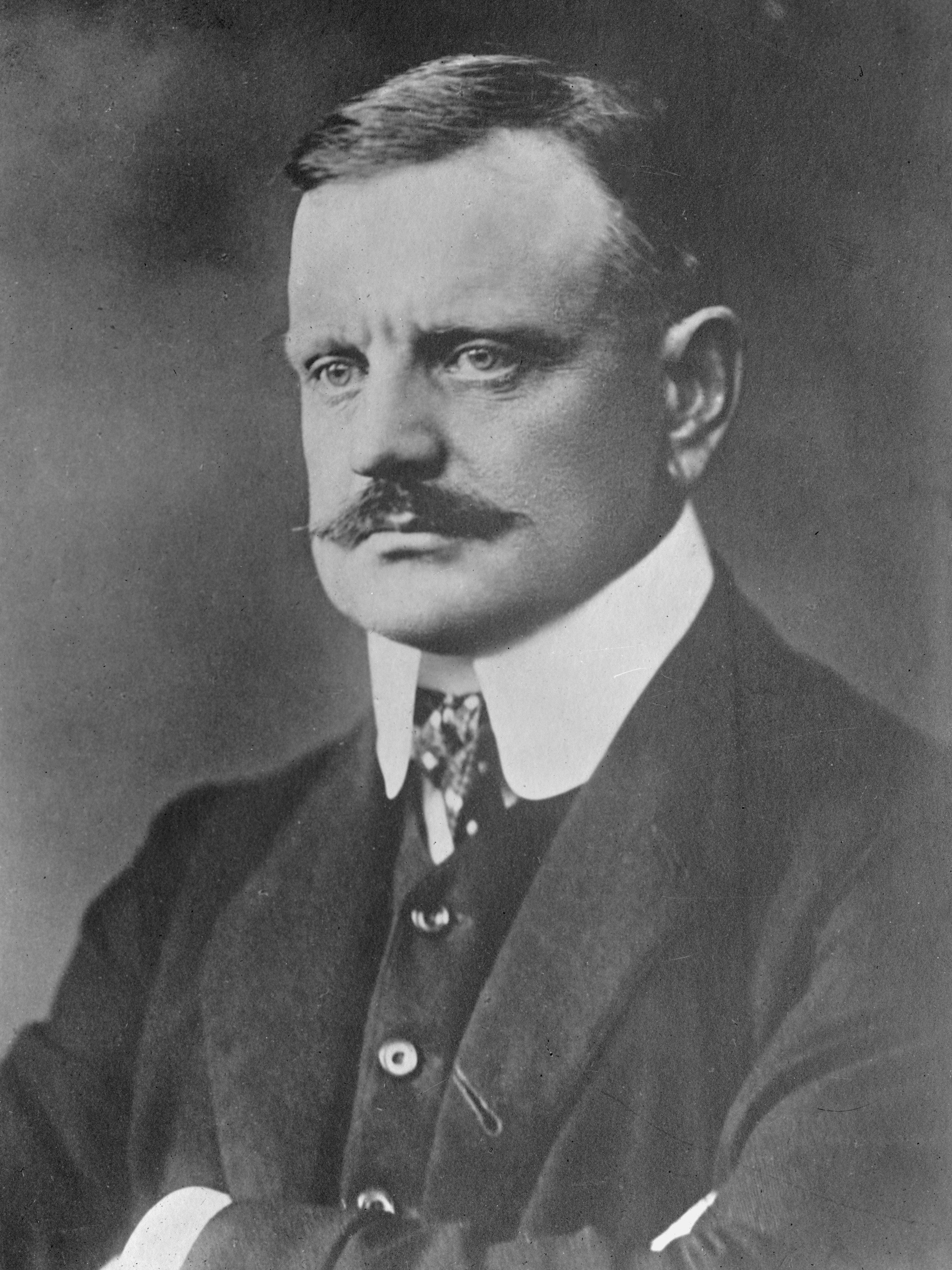
- The composer (c. 1913)
- Opus: 69
- Composed: 1912–1913
- Publisher: Breitkopf & Härtel (1913)
- Duration: 13 mins.

Premiere
- Date: 8 December 1915
- Location: Helsinki, Finland
- Conductor: Jean Sibelius
- Performers: Helsinki Philharmonic Orchestra; Richard Burgin (violin)

The Two Serenades, Op. 69, are concertante compositions for violin and orchestra, written from 1912 to 1913 by the Finnish composer Jean Sibelius. They are the:

- Serenade No. 1 in D major, Op. 69a. Andante assai
- Serenade No. 2 in G minor, Op. 69b. Lento assai

The Two Serenades premiered on 8 December 1915 during the composer's semicentennial celebration. Sibelius conducted the Helsinki Philharmonic Orchestra; the soloist was Polish-American violinist Richard Burgin. Also on the program was the initial version of the Symphony No. 5 in E-flat major (Op. 82), as well as the tone poem The Oceanides (Op. 78).

== Instrumentation ==
The Serenade No. 1 is scored for the following instruments:

- Soloist: violin
- Woodwinds: 2 flutes, 2 oboes, 2 clarinets (in A), and 2 bassoons
- Brass: 4 horns (in F)
- Percussion: timpani
- Strings: violins, violas, cellos, and double basses

The Serenade No. 2 has identical scoring, except for the addition of triangle to the percussion section; it also has the clarinetists switch to B♭ clarinet.

== Recordings ==
The sortable table below lists commercially available recordings of the complete Two Serenades:

No.	Conductor	Orchestra	Soloist	Rec. (Note: Refers to the year in which the performers recorded the work; this may not be the same as the year in which the recording was first released to the general public.)	Time	Recording venue	Label	Ref.
1	Paavo Berglund	Bournemouth Symphony Orchestra	Ida Haendel	1975	13:27	Southampton Guildhall	EMI Classics	(Note: P. Breglund–EMI Classics (7243 5 75236 2 2) 2002)
2	Vladimir Ashkenazy	Philharmonia Orchestra	Boris Belkin	1979	14:55	Kingsway Hall	Decca	(Note: V. Ashkenazy–Decca (473 590–2) 2003)
3	Vernon Handley	Radio-Symphonie-Orchester Berlin	Ralph Holmes	1980	13:33	Jesus-Christus-Kirche, Berlin	Schwann, Koch	(Note: [ V. Handley–Koch-Schwann (CD 311 003 F1) 1988])
4	Neeme Järvi	Gothenburg Symphony Orchestra	Dong-Suk Kang	1989	13:16	Gothenburg Concert Hall	BIS	(Note: N. Järvi–BIS (CD–472) 1990)
5	Jukka-Pekka Saraste	Finnish Radio Symphony Orchestra (2)	Joseph Swensen	1990	12:42	Kulttuuritalo	RCA Red Seal	(Note: J. Saraste–RCA Red Seal (19439704812 (8)) 2020)
6	André Previn	Staatskapelle Dresden	Anne-Sophie Mutter	1995	13:25	Lukaskirche, Dresden	Deutsche Grammophon	(Note: A. Previn–DG (447 895–2) 1995)
7	Atso Almila	Kuopio Symphony Orchestra	Jaakko Kuusisto	1999	14:44	Kuopio Music Center	Finlandia	(Note: A. Almila–Finlandia (3984–23391–2) 1999)
8	Thomas Dausgaard	Danish National Symphony Orchestra	Christian Tetzlaff	2002	11:40	Danish Radio Concert Hall (old)	Virgin Classics	(Note: T. Dausgaard–Virgin Classics (7243 5 45534 2 4) 2002)
9	Pekka Kuusisto	Tapiola Sinfonietta	Pekka Kuusisto	2006	11:22	Tapiola Hall, Espoo Cultural Centre	Ondine	(Note: P. Kuusisto–Ondine (ODE 1074–5) 2006)
10	Douglas Bostock	Gothenburg-Aarhus Philharmonic	Sakari Tapponen	2007	12:20	Frichsparken, Aarhus	Classico	(Note: D. Bostock–Classico (CLASSCD 733) 2007)
11	Santtu-Matias Rouvali	Tampere Philharmonic Orchestra	Baiba Skride	2015	14:23	Tampere Hall	Orfeo	(Note: S. Rouvali–Orfeo (C 896 152 A) 2015)
12	Sir Edward Gardner	Bergen Philharmonic Orchestra	James Ehnes	2023	11:47	Grieg Hall	Chandos	(Note: E. Gardner–Chandos (CHAN 5267) 2024)

== Notes, references, and sources ==
Notes

Sources

- Barnett, Andrew (2007). Sibelius. New Haven: Yale University Press. ISBN 978-0-300-11159-0.
- Dahlström, Fabian [in Swedish] (2003). Jean Sibelius: Thematisch-bibliographisches Verzeichnis seiner Werke [Jean Sibelius: A Thematic Bibliographic Index of His Works] (in German). Wiesbaden: Breitkopf & Härtel. ISBN 3-7651-0333-0.
- Tawaststjerna, Erik (1986). Sibelius: Volume 2, 1904–1914. (Robert Layton, English translation). London: Faber and Faber. ISBN 978-0-571-24773-8.
- Tawaststjerna, Erik (1997). Sibelius: Volume 3, 1914–1957. (Robert Layton, English translation). London: Faber and Faber. ISBN 978-0-571-24774-5.
