= Op. 77 =

In music, Op. 77 stands for Opus number 77. Compositions that are assigned this number include:

- Arnold – Concerto for Two Violins and String Orchestra
- Beethoven - Fantasia for Piano (1809)
- Brahms – Violin Concerto
- Britten – The Burning Fiery Furnace
- Dvořák – String Quintet No. 2
- Elgar – Une voix dans le désert
- Glazunov – Symphony No. 7
- Haydn, Franz - String Quartets Opus 77 (“Lobkowitz”)
- Krenek – Cefalo e Procri
- Schubert - Valses Nobles
- Schumann – Lieder und Gesänge volume III (5 songs)
- Shostakovich – Violin Concerto No. 1
- Sibelius – Two Serious Melodies, concertante works for violin (or cello) and orchestra (1914–1915, arranged 1916)
- Tchaikovsky – Fatum
