= Ernst Hellmut Vits =

German entrepreneur and lawyer (1903–1970)

- Born: 19 September 1903; Barmen, Wuppertal, North Rhine-Westphalia, Germany
- Died: 23 January 1970 (aged 66); Wuppertal, North Rhine-Westphalia, Germany
- Occupations: Lawyer, businessman
- Known for: CEO of Vereinigte Glanzstoff-Fabriken

Ernst Hellmut Vits (19 September 1903 – 23 January 1970) was a German lawyer who headed the rayon manufacturer Vereinigte Glanzstoff-Fabriken (VGF) from 1940 to 1969.

== Life ==
=== Early life (1903–33) ===
Ernst Hellmut Vits was born on 19 September 1903 in Barmen, Wuppertal. His father, Ernst August Vitz, was an evangelical minister who later became General Superintendent of Neumark and Lower Lusatia. His mother was Julie, née Schaefer. He had three sisters and two brothers. In 1912 his family moved from Düsseldorf to Berlin. After graduating from the Royal Wilhelm Gymnasium in Berlin, he trained as a commercial assistant in a Berlin ironware factory. At the same time he studied law and political science at the Humboldt University of Berlin, then in 1924 at the University of Münster. He passed his first state examination in Law in 1925 and became a Doctor of Law in 1926. In March 1929 he took the court assessor examination with the Prussian Ministry of Justice. From April 1929 he was a legal adviser to the Deutsche Revisions- und Treuhand AG, an auditing firm. He soon became a member of the board.

In 1929 he married his first wife, Eleonore, née Müller. After a divorce he married Ingrid, née Molchin. He was the father of three children.

=== Nazi period (1933–45) ===
During the National Socialist period Vits was a Wehrwirtschaftsführer and belonged to the Armed Economic Council. According to the historian Klaus-Dietmar Henke, he was a member of the Nazi Party. In 1937 he was among the founders of the Reichswerke Hermann Göring in Salzgitter. Vits moved from Deutsche Revisions- und Treuhand to Vereinigte Glanzstoff-Fabriken (VGF) in 1939, where he became chairman and chief executive officer in April 1940. Vits tried to ensure his company maintained leadership in the German rayon industry". He took the position of president of the National Association of Chemical Fibers. On 23 October 1941 Vits and the economics professor Alfred Müller-Armack founded the Research Center for Textile Education and Enterprise in Münster. Vits gave financial support to his brother-in-law Heinrich Grüber, a Protestant clergyman and opponent of the Nazis, who helped racially persecuted evangelical Christians. After Grüber was arrested, he was released from concentration camp due to international efforts and multiple interventions by Vits.

=== Postwar (1945–70) ===
After the end of World War II Vits moved his official residence from Berlin to Coburg and then to Wuppertal. In June 1945 the British Military Administration appointed him trustee of the VGF. He was able to prevent the company being completely destroyed. In January 1947 he was appointed financial adviser to the Combined Coal Group. In this capacity he gave advice on the reorganization of German coal mining and prepared the transfer of the coal industry to German trusteeship. He completed this assignment in 1949. During the Nuremberg trials, he was interrogated on 11 May 1948 as part of the IG Farben trial. His main task in the postwar period was reconstruction of the VGF factories that had been partly destroyed during the war.

Vits was a member of the supervisory boards of the Deutsche Revisions- und Treuhand, Zellstofffabrik Waldhof, Deutsche Bank, Deutsche Erdöl, Gewerkschaft Sophia-Jacoba, Rheinpreußen für Bergbau und Chemim, and Hamburg America Line. He also belonged to the supervisory board of Schwelmer Eisenwerk Müller & Co. GmbH., which he chaired from 1946. He was also chairman of the board of Kuag Textil, Barmer Maschinenfabrik and J. P. Bemberg.

After 30 years as CEO and general manager of the VGF in July 1969 he was made chairman of the board. That year the merger of his company with the Dutch Algemene Kunstzijde Unie was completed. Vits died in Wuppertal on 23 January 1970 following an operation.

== Social commitment ==
=== Promotion of science ===
Vits was committed to the promotion of science and was a member of numerous relevant bodies. In 1947 he initiated the Society for the Promotion of the Westphalian Wilhelms University, later named the University of Münster Society, which awarded the Ernst-Hellmut-Vits prize from 1968. From 1947 to 1970 he was the first chairman of the society. From 1954 to 1970 he was Vice President of the Deutsche Forschungsgemeinschaft (German Research Foundation). From 1955 to 1970 he was Chairman of the Stifterverband für die Deutsche Wissenschaft (Donors' Association for German Science). He was among the first members of the Scientific Advisory Board, founded in 1959 by the Fritz Thyssen Foundation. From 1964 he was a member of the Senate of the Max Planck Society.

In 1993 his children Hans-Joachim Vits, Gisela Vits and Eleonore Vits-Kinader created the Ernst Hellmut Vits-Foundation.

=== Promotion of culture and social engagement ===
Vits supported the Mainfränkisches Museum in Würzburg, the Römermuseum Obernburg and the Stiftsmuseum der Stadt Aschaffenburg. He was patron of an elementary school in Erlenbach am Main, named for him because of his donations. In Laudenbach in 1954 he and his wife were dispensers of the Evangelical John's Chapel.

== Honors ==
The awards given to Ernst Hellmut Vits included:

- Ring of Honour of the city of Wuppertal (1969)
- Conveyor's Ring of the Donors' Association for German Science (1963)
- Honorary Senator of the University of Münster (1952)
- Honorary doctorate of the University of Münster (1953)
- Honorary Senator of the Technische Universität Berlin
- Bronze Plaque "The conveyor German Science"
- Honorary citizen of Oberburg, Erlenbach and Laudenbach
- Large Federal Cross of Merit (1953) with star (1963)
- Austrian Cross of Honor for Science and Art, First Class (1962)
- Bavarian Order of Merit (1969)

== Sources ==
- Dollinger, Heinz (1980). Die Universität Münster: 1780-1980 (in German). Aschendorff. ISBN 978-3402051979.
- Henke, Klaus-Dietmar (1996). Die amerikanische Besetzung Deutschlands (in German). Vol. 2. München: Oldenbourg. ISBN 9783486561753.
- Homberg, Frank Friedhelm (2008). Retterwiderstand in Wuppertal während des Nationalsozialismus (in German). Dissertation for Dusseldorf University. Düsseldorf.
- Klee, Ernst (2007). Das Personenlexikon zum Dritten Reich (in German). Frankfurt am Main: Fischer Taschenbuch Verlag. ISBN 978-3100393098.
- Koch, vgl. Peter-Ferdinand (2000). Die Geldgeschäfte der SS. Wie deutsche Banken den schwarzen Terror finanzierten (in German). Hamburg: Hoffmann und Campe. ISBN 3-455-11285-4.
- Langenbruch, Theodor (1970). "Ernst Hellmut Vits". Wuppertaler Biographien: Folge 9 (in German). Wuppertal: Born.
- Obermeyer, Erhard (1992). Universität Münster: ein Porträt (in German). Münster: Aschendorff Verlag. ISBN 978-3402051641.
- Schnöring, Kurt (1981). Auschwitz begann in Wuppertal (in German). Wuppertal: Peter Hammer Verlag. ISBN 3-87294-174-7.
- Vierhaus, Rudolf (2008). Deutsche Biographische Enzyklopädie (in German). Vol. 10: 'Thies – Zymalkowski. Berlin. ISBN 9783598231605.
