= Two Serious Melodies =

Two concertante pieces by Jean Sibelius

- Concertante pieces by Jean Sibelius
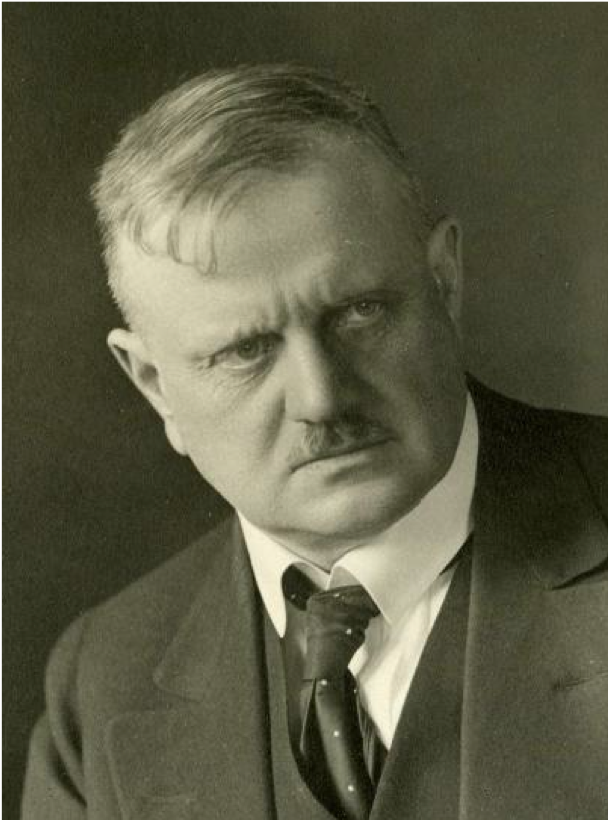
- The composer (c. 1915)
- Opus: 77
- Composed: 1914–1915
- Publisher: Hansen (1922–1923)
- Duration: 8 mins

Premiere
- Date: 30 March 1916
- Location: Helsinki, Grand Duchy of Finland
- Conductor: Jean Sibelius
- Performers: Helsinki Philharmonic Orchestra; Ossian Fohström (cello)

The Two Serious Melodies, Op. 77, are concertante compositions for violin and orchestra written from 1914 to 1915 by the Finnish composer Jean Sibelius. They are:

- Cantique, Op. 77/1 (1914); subtitled "Laetare anima mea" ("Rejoice my soul"). Moderato assai
- Devotion, Op. 77/2 (1915); subtitled "Ab imo pectore" ("From my very heart"). Tempo molto moderato

Sibelius originally called No. 1 Lofsången (Song of Praise). In 1915, he made transcriptions of each piece for violin and piano. In 1916, he arranged both pieces for cello and orchestra and transcribed them, too, for cello and piano.

Each piece is dedicated to the Finnish cellist Ossian Fohström.

== Instrumentation ==
Cantique is scored for the following instruments:

- Soloist: violin (or cello)
- Woodwinds: 2 flutes and 2 clarinets (in B♭)
- Brass: 2 horns (in F)
- Percussion: timpani (2 players)
- Strings: violins, violas, cellos, double basses, and harp

Devotion is scored for the following instruments:

- Soloist: violin (or cello)
- Woodwinds: 2 flutes, 2 clarinets (in A), and 2 bassoons
- Brass: 4 horns (in F) and 3 trombones
- Strings: violins, violas, cellos, and double basses

== Recordings ==
The sortable table below lists commercially available recordings of the complete Two Serious Melodies:

No.	Conductor	Orchestra	Soloist	Rec. (Note: Refers to the year in which the performers recorded the work; this may not be the same as the year in which the recording was first released to the general public.)	Time	Recording venue	Label	Ref.
1	Vladimir Ashkenazy	Philharmonia Orchestra	Boris Belkin (violin)	1979	7:23	Kingsway Hall	Decca	(Note: V. Ashkenazy–Decca (473 590–2) 2003)
2	Vernon Handley	Berlin Radio Symphony Orchestra	Ralph Holmes (violin)	1980	9:31	Jesus-Christus-Kirche, Berlin	Schwann, Koch	(Note: V. Handley–Koch-Schwann (CD 311 003 F1) 1988)
3	Lawrence Foster	Berlin Radio Symphony Orchestra	David Geringas (violin)	1980	8:24	Jesus-Christus-Kirche, Berlin	Parnass	(Note: L. Foster–Parnass (91 987 8) 1982)
4	Neeme Järvi	Gothenburg Symphony Orchestra	Dong-Suk Kang (violin)	1989	8:28	Gothenburg Concert Hall	BIS	(Note: N. Järvi–BIS (CD–472) 1990)
5	Jukka-Pekka Saraste	Finnish Radio Symphony Orchestra	Arto Noras (cello)				Finlandia	(Note: J. Saraste–Finlandia (4509–95872–2) 1992)
6	Luca Pfaff	Monte-Carlo Philharmonic Orchestra	Marie Scheublé				Arion Music	(Note: L. Pfaff–Arion Music (ARN 68330) 1996)
7	Thomas Dausgaard	Danish National Symphony Orchestra	Christian Tetzlaff (violin)	2002		Danish Radio Concert Hall (old)	Virgin Classics	(Note: T. Dausgaard–Virgin Classics (7243 5 45534 2 4) 2002)
8	Osmo Vänskä	Lahti Symphony Orchestra	Marko Ylönen (cello)	2004		Sibelius Hall	BIS	(Note: O. Vänskä–BIS (CD–1485) 2006)
9	Leif Segerstam	Turku Philharmonic Orchestra	Mikaela Palmu (violin)	2014	10:17	Turku Concert Hall	Naxos	(Note: L. Segerstam–Naxos (8.573340) 2015)
10	Alejandro Garrido Porras	Orquestra Vigo 430	Nicolas Dautricourt (violin)	2014	9:15	Martín Códax Auditorium, Vigo Conservatory of Music	La Dolce Volta	(Note: A. Garrido Porras–La Dolce Volta (LDV 23) 2015)
11	Sir Edward Gardner	Bergen Philharmonic Orchestra	James Ehnes (violin)	2023	8:03	Grieg Hall	Chandos	(Note: E. Gardner–Chandos (CHAN 5267) 2024)

== Notes, references, and sources ==
Notes

Sources

- Barnett, Andrew (2007). Sibelius. New Haven: Yale University Press. ISBN 978-0-300-11159-0.
- Dahlström, Fabian [in Swedish] (2003). Jean Sibelius: Thematisch-bibliographisches Verzeichnis seiner Werke [Jean Sibelius: A Thematic Bibliographic Index of His Works] (in German). Wiesbaden: Breitkopf & Härtel. ISBN 3-7651-0333-0.
