= Road Movies (Adams) =

1995 composition by John Adams

Road Movies is a 1995 minimalist composition for violin and piano by the American composer John Adams.

== Composition ==
Road Movies was written in 1995, as Adams was beginning to move beyond formal minimalism.

The piece is in three movements and lasts about 15 minutes in total. The movements are titled as follows:

1. First movement: relaxed groove
2. Second movement: meditative
3. Third movement: 40% swing
