= Jesus Church, Berlin-Kaulsdorf =

Jesus Church
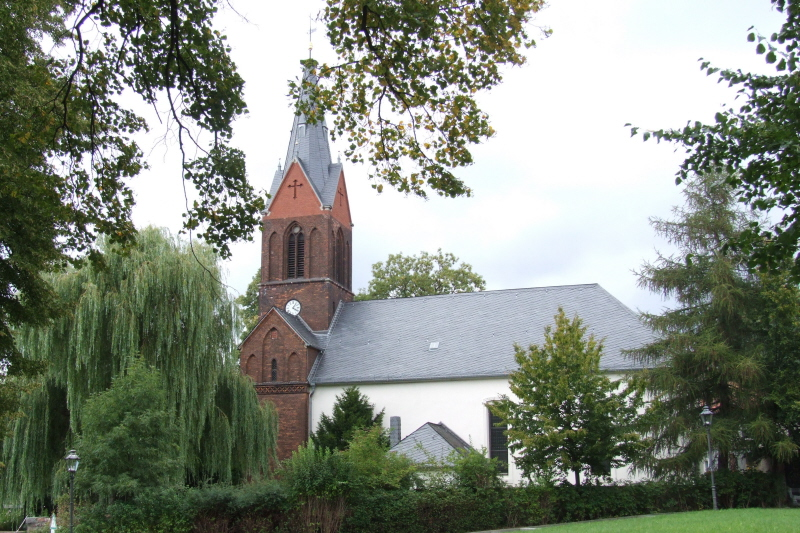
- Seen from the south – with the spire reconstructed in 1999 after war destruction in 1945

Religion
- Affiliation: United Protestant, originally Roman Catholic, from 1539 on Lutheran, since the 19th century Evangelical Protestant.
- District: Sprengel Berlin (region), Kirchenkreis Lichtenberg-Oberspree (deanery)
- Province: Evangelical Church of Berlin-Brandenburg-Silesian Upper Lusatia
- Year consecrated: unknown

Location
- Location: Kaulsdorf, a locality of Berlin
- Interactive map of Jesus Church
- Coordinates: 52°30′30″N 13°34′51″E

Architecture
- Style: Romanesque, later extensions and refurbishes
- Completed: 14th and 15th centuries
- Materials: small boulders, covered with plaster, and brick

Website
- Congregation Kaulsdorf (in German)

Jesus Church (Kaulsdorf) (German: Jesuskirche, colloquially also Dorfkirche, village church) is the church of the Evangelical Berlin-Kaulsdorf Congregation, a member of today's Protestant umbrella organisation Evangelical Church of Berlin-Brandenburg-Silesian Upper Lusatia (under this name since 2004). The church building is located in Berlin, borough Marzahn-Hellersdorf, in the locality of Kaulsdorf. The church was named after Jesus of Nazareth. The congregation's parish comprises the area of the historical village of Kaulsdorf, which had been incorporated into Berlin by the Prussian Greater Berlin Act in 1920.

== As a Roman Catholic place of worship (until 1539) ==
Kaulsdorf (then Caulstorp in the Electorate of Brandenburg) used to be a village of soccage farmers, with their dues to be delivered first to the Kalands Brethren confraternity in Bernau bei Berlin, as documented in a deed of donatio by Margrave Louis I of Brandenburg as of 1347, representing the oldest surviving record of Kaulsdorf. The church is located in the midst of the village green, enclosed in a church yard surrounded by a wall of boulders. The church dates back to the 14th century; its apse of Romanesque style may be preserved from a preceding building (13th century). The oriented nave is built from small boulders, clad with plaster. In 1412, St. Peter's Church acquired the manorial seniority over parts of Kaulsdorf. Therefore, the Provost of St. Peter's held the ius patronatus over church and parish in Kaulsdorf. Prince-Elector Joachim II Hector wanted to increase the number of canons at Berlin's Collegiate Church of Our Lady, the Holy Cross, the Ss. Peter, Paul, Erasmus and Nicholas. So he redeployed some ecclesiastical estates and thus in 1536 Kaulsdorf became a manorial estate held by the canon-law College of that Collegiate Church, in order to provide the revenues for its three additional prebendaries. Also, the ius patronatus was transferred to the collegiate church.

== As a Lutheran place of worship (from 1539 on) ==
In 1539, Prince-Elector Joachim II Hector converted from Catholicism to Lutheranism, as earlier many of his subjects had done. The church of Kaulsdorf thus became Lutheran too, like most of the electoral subjects and all the churches in the Electorate of Brandenburg. Kaulsdorf's church was now served by the pastors of the neighbouring village Biesdorf.

In 1608, Prince-Elector John Sigismund converted the collegiate church into the Supreme Parish Church of Berlin, which became a Calvinist church in 1613, when John Sigismund admitted his earlier conversion from Lutheranism to Calvinism. Now Calvinist clergy had become the patrons of a Lutheran congregation in Kaulsdorf, since John Sigismund waived his regnal privilege to demand a conversion of his subjects (Cuius regio, eius religio). In the course of the Thirty Years War (1618–1648) Lutheran Swedish troops under Gustavus II Adolphus and the Catholic Imperial Army under Wallenstein ravaged and plundered Kaulsdorf and its inhabitants in 1638. The survivors deserted the devastated village, leaving the church without parishioners. With the successful repopulation of the village until 1652 by the Prince-Electors, ecclesiastical life reemerged.

In 1715, the church was refurbished and altered. The nave has been lengthened towards the east, and the windows were altered in their forms. The new, longer nave received a flat ceiling above a circular ledge, carried by busts of angels (German: Engelsflüchte(n)). On the southern side a chapel was added to the building, which now houses the heating system.

== As a Prussian Union place of worship (after 1817) ==
In 1817, under the auspices of King Frederick William III of Prussia, the Lutheran congregation of Kaulsdorf, like most Prussian Protestant congregations, joined the common umbrella organisation then called the Evangelical Church in Prussia (under this name since 1821), with each congregation maintaining its former denomination or adopting the new united denomination (Prussian Union (Evangelical Christian Church)). The Kaulsdorf church still being subordinate to the ius patronatus of the Supreme Parish and Collegiate Church, the king's court church, will most probably have promptly joined the Prussian Union.

In 1874, the new church constitution (Kirchenordnung) of the Evangelical Church provided for all parishes the election of presbyters and synodals, thus constituting the parishes as congregations of legal entity status. However, the church building, including the costs of its maintenance, remained under ius patronatus, allowing the patron, then the Supreme Parish and Collegiate Church's presbytery (German: Domkirchenkollegium), to appoint the pastors in Kaulsdorf. In 1875, the half-timbered church tower gave way for a new extension from brick masonry, attached to the west of the church, including a church tower on a square ground plan. The congregation experienced a drastic inflow of new parishioners moving in during the process of urbanisation after 1900. In May 1926 the Nazi Party (NSDAP) founded a local group (Ortsgruppe) in Kaulsdorf, which became the first suburb of Berlin where the party could establish. The local group, among others led by Wilhelm Kube and Kurt Daluege, became the nucleus for most of the other local groups in Berlin's eastern suburbia.

== Under Nazi rule ==
After the premature re-election of presbyters and synodals on 23 July 1933, which Adolf Hitler had discretionarily imposed onto all Protestant church bodies in Germany (see Evangelical Church of the old-Prussian Union), the Nazi partisan Protestant so-called Faith Movement of German Christians, founded by Kube among others, gained a majority in the presbytery of the Kaulsdorf Congregation, like in most congregations within the Evangelical Church of the old-Prussian Union. With the new majorities on all levels of church organisation the German Christians systematically tried to subject any unadulterated form of Protestantism by way of firing church employees of other opinion, blocking church property for non-Nazi Protestant groups, and prohibiting collections for other purposes than the officially approved ones.

On 2 February 1934, the presbytery of the Supreme Parish and Collegiate Church appointed the Reformed Heinrich Grüber as the new pastor of the Kaulsdorf congregation, since this church still held the ius patronatus of the Kaulsdorf Church. Grüber, before pastor at the diaconal foundation Stephanus-Stiftung Waldhof in Templin and known as member of the Nazi opposing Emergency Covenant of Pastors (German: Pfarrernotbund), was strictly rejected by the German Christian-dominated Kaulsdorf presbytery. But the March of Brandenburg ecclesiastical provincial consistory (the competent bureaucracy within the old-Prussian Church) insisted on his appointment as decided by the presbytery of the Supreme Parish and Collegiate Church. The office of pastor included the function as executive-in-chief of the presbytery. Thus conflicts were unavoidable. The German Christian presbyters steadily denounced Grüber within the ecclesiastical bureaucracy for criticising Ludwig Müller, the then old-Prussian state bishop (German: Landesbischof), and the Nazi party local group leader denounced him at the Gestapo, for criticising the Nazi sterilisation laws (see Nazi Eugenics) and for mercy and sympathy with the Jews.

Prior to Grüber's appointment, the few congregants in Kaulsdorf opposing the Nazi interference and adulteration of Protestantism did not organise as a group. Now Grüber built up a Confessing Church congregation at Jesus Church. As the officially appointed pastor Grüber held the regular services in Jesus Church, preaching against the Cult of personality of Hitler, the armament of Germany, and anti-Semitism.

However, other events, such as collections of money for purposes of the Confessing Church, meetings of its adherents or elections of their brethren council, paralleling the German Christian-dominated presbytery, were forbidden to take place as events open for the public, but only card-carrying members were allowed. Grüber carried the – due to their colour so-called – Red Card No. 4, issued on 22 December 1934 by the Confessing congregation of Kaulsdorf. The information about Grüber's appointment spread among the adherents of the Confessing Church in neighbouring congregations comprising the competent deanery Berlin Land I, such as Ahrensfelde, Biesdorf, Blumberg, Fredersdorf, Friedrichsfelde, Heinersdorf, Hohenschönhausen, Karlshorst, Klein-Schönebeck, Lichtenberg, Mahlsdorf, Marzahn, Neuenhagen, Petershagen, or Weißensee mostly without a local pastor supporting them. They started to travel for Sunday services to Jesus Church. Grüber encouraged them to establish Confessing congregations of their own and attended, e.g., the formal foundation of Friedrichsfelde Confessing congregation on 1 February 1935. Grüber presided over the Confessing synod of the deanery Berlin Land I, constituted from Confessing synodals from the pertaining congregations on 3 March 1935. The Confessing congregants in Kaulsdorf's congregation became a great support for Grüber. He also provided for Confessing pastors, who would act in his place once he could not hold the service himself. In August 1935, his colleague Pastor Neumann from Köpenick preached instead of him, criticising the anti-Semitic policy of the German government, which earned him a denunciation by the presbytery.

On the occasion of the Remilitarisation of the Rhineland in 1936 Hitler unconstitutionally and arbitrarily decreed a re-election of the Nazi puppet Reichstag for 29 March which was Palm Sunday, the traditional day Protestant congregations would celebrate the confirmations of the confirmands, who had grown to ecclesiastical adulthood. The compromising Wilhelm Zoellner, leading the Protestant church bodies in Germany (1935–1937), regarded this an unfriendly act against Protestantism, but nevertheless obeyed and tried to delay the confirmations, asking a furlough for confirmands from the compulsory agricultural season labour of the Deutsche Arbeitsfront (DAF), starting right next Monday. The DAF refused.

The second preliminary executive (German: zweite Vorläufige Kirchenleitung) of the Confessing German Evangelical Church was of the opinion that the confirmations were not to be delayed. Since fathers, being state officials and/or card-carrying Nazi partisans, were ordered to organise and implement the poll as election judges and with relatives travelling all around Germany to participate in their relatives' or godchildren's confirmation, the Nazis feared a low turnout in the election. This made the confirmations on the traditional date a political issue. Thus, only a few pastors did not compromise in the end, but Grüber was one of the few (e.g., one out of 13 in Berlin) who held the confirmation services as usual, even though the Nazi government had announced this would not be without consequences. German Christian presbyters denounced Grüber again for his opposing attitudes at the March of Brandenburg provincial consistory and the Gestapo. The NSDAP local party leader (Ortsgruppenleiter) threatened to prompt Gruber's deportation to a concentration camp. In 1936 Berlin's congregation of Dutch Calvinist expatriates elected Grüber their pastor, which he remained until his arrest in 1940.

The mainstream Nazi anti-Semitism considered the Jewry as a group of people bound by close, so-called genetic (blood) ties, to form a unit, which one could not join or secede from. The influence of Jews was declared to have a detrimental impact on Germany, so as to justify the discrimination and persecution of Jews. To be spared from that, one had to prove one's affiliation with the group of the so-called Aryan race. It was paradoxical that genetic tests or outward racial features never determined one's affiliation, although the Nazis palavered a lot about physiognomy, but only the records of religious affiliations of one's grandparents decided. However, while the grandparents were earlier still able to choose their religion, their grandchildren in the Nazi era were compulsorily categorised as Jews, if at least three of the four grandparents were enrolled as members of a Jewish congregation. This Nazi categorisation as Jews of course included mostly Jews of Jewish descent, but also many Gentiles of Jewish descent, such as Catholics, irreligionists, and Protestants, who happened to have had grandparents belonging – according to the records – to a Jewish congregation. While Jewish congregations in Germany tried – little as they were allowed – to help their persecuted members, the Protestant church bodies failed to assist their parishioners who were classified as Jews (according to the Nuremberg Laws) and the somewhat less persecuted Mischlinge of partially Jewish descent.

On 31 January 1936 the International Church Relief Commission for German Refugees was founded in London, but its German counterpart never materialised. So Bishop George Bell got his sister-in-law Laura Livingstone to run an office for the international relief commission in Berlin. The failure of the Confessing Church was evident, even though 70–80% of the Christian Germans of Jewish descent were Protestants.

It was Grüber and some enthusiasts who started a new effort in 1936. They forced the Confessing Church's hand, which in 1938 supported the new organisation, named by the Gestapo Bureau Grüber (German: Büro Grüber), but after its official recognition Relief Centre for Evangelical Non-Aryans.

During the night of 9 November 1938 the Nazi government organised the November Pogrom, often emphasised as Kristallnacht. The well-organised Nazi squads killed several hundreds and 1,200 Jewish Berliners were deported to Sachsenhausen concentration camp. Many men went into hiding from arrest and also appeared at Grüber's home in the rectory of the Jesus Church. He organised their hiding in the cottages in the allotment clubs in his parish.

The Nazis only released the arrested inmates if they would immediately emigrate. Thus getting a visa became the main target and problem of Grüber's Bureau. Grüber was allowed to travel several times to the Netherlands and Great Britain in order to persuade the authorities there to grant visas for those persecuted in Germany. So Grüber hardly found time any more to serve at his actual office as pastor in Kaulsdorf.

From September 1939, Bureau Grüber was put under the supervision of Adolf Eichmann. Eichmann asked Grüber in a meeting about Jewish emigration why Grüber, not having any Jewish family and with no prospect for any thanks, helps the Jews. Grüber answered because the Good Samaritan did so, and my Lord told me to do so.

By autumn 1939 a new degree of persecution loomed. The Nazi authorities started to deport Jewish Austrians and Gentile Austrians of Jewish descent to occupied Poland. On 13 February 1940 the same fate hit 1,200 Jewish Germans and Gentile Germans of Jewish descent from Stettin, who were deported to Lublin. Grüber learned about it by the Wehrmacht commander of Lublin and then protested to every higher ranking superior up to the then Prussian Minister-President Hermann Göring, who forbade further deportations from Prussia for the time being. The Gestapo warned Grüber never to show support for the deported again. The deported were not allowed to return.

On 22–23 October 1940, 6,500 Jewish Germans and Gentile Germans of Jewish descent from Baden and the Palatinate were deported to Gurs, occupied France. Now Grüber got himself a passport, with the help of Dietrich Bonhoeffer's brother-in-law Hans von Dohnanyi from the Abwehr, to visit the deported in the Gurs (concentration camp). But before he left the Gestapo arrested Grüber on 19 December and deported him two days later to Sachsenhausen concentration camp, and in 1941 to Dachau concentration camp where he became inmate No. 27832. For 18 December 1942 Grüber's wife Margarete, still living in the rectory of the Kaulsdorf congregation, managed to get a visitor's permit to speak with him for 30 minutes in Dachau, accompanied by their elder son Hans-Rolf, arguing that he, being the husband and thus according to the garbled Nazi ideas of family values the decision-making party in the family, would have to decide about important financial matters, about which he would have to instruct the remaining eldest, though minor, male family member. Grüber survived Dachau and built up good relations with many other inmates, among them also communists. He was released from Dachau to his wife Margarete, née Vits, and their three children Ingeborg, Hans-Rolf, and Ernst-Hartmut in Kaulsdorf on 23 June 1943, after he signed an agreement not to help the persecuted any more.

Grüber then resumed his office as pastor of Kaulsdorf and the Confessing Church in the Berlin Land I deanery. He reported in the Confessing congregations of the deanery about the truth in a concentration camp, such as Dachau and Sachsenhausen. The church weathered the Second World War rather intact, but at the end of the war the spire was shot down by artillery fire. On 22 April 1945 at the invasion of the Red Army into the Kaulsdorf neighbourhood, Grüber gathered some undaunted Kaulsdorfers to follow him with white flags to march in the direction of the Soviet soldiers in order to avoid further bloodshed.

== After the war ==
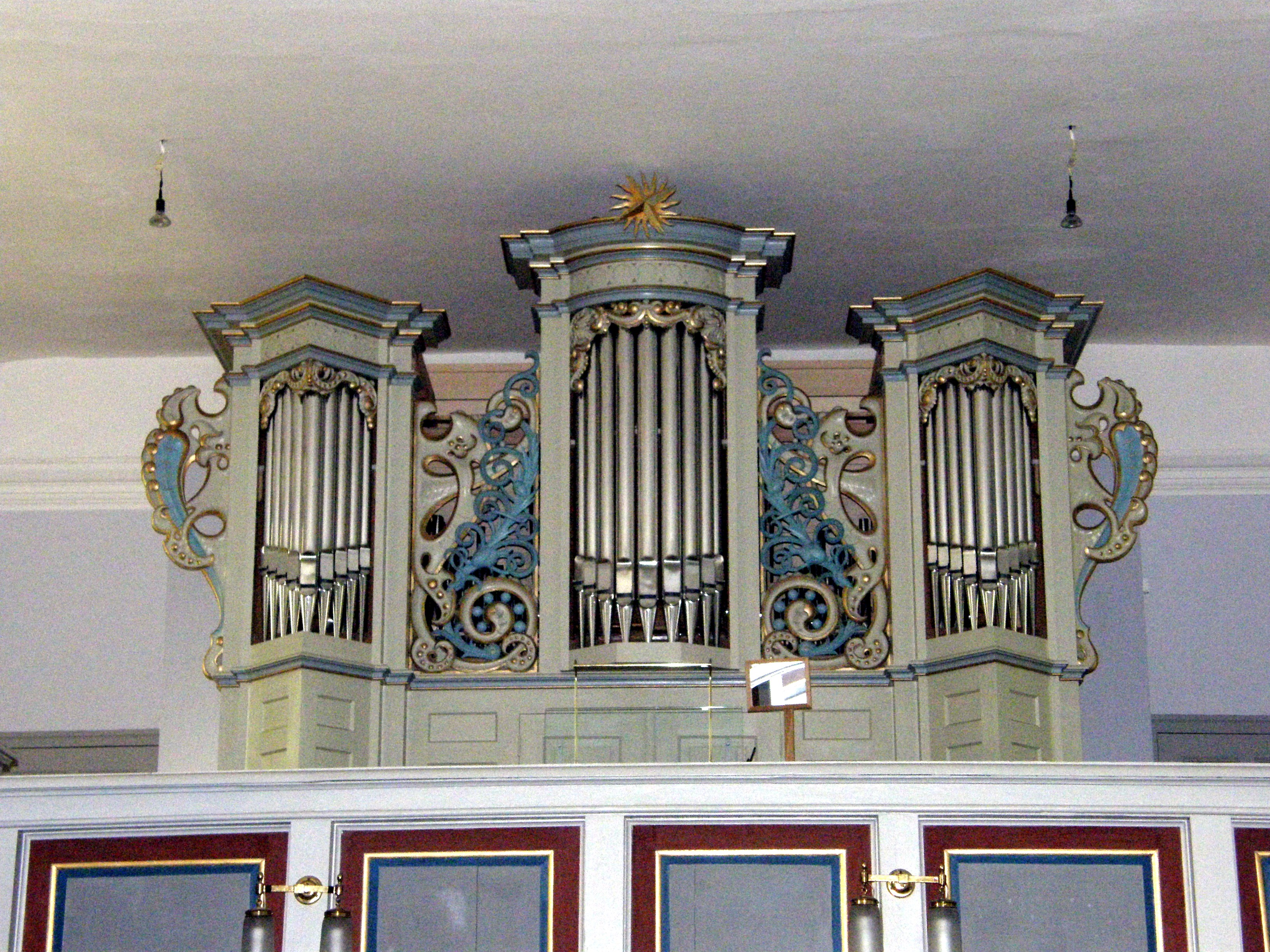
Organ

In the massive rapes of girls and women by the Soviet soldiers in the following weeks and months Grüber organised to hide girls and women. In 1945 Kaulsdorf turned out to be part of the Soviet Eastern Sector of Berlin.

Grüber reopened his Bureau, now serving survivors, returning from the concentration camps. F.K. Otto Dibelius, who had assumed the post-war leadership of the March of Brandenburg ecclesiastical province within the old-Prussian Church for the time being, appointed Grüber as one of the Nazi opposing pastors for the new leading bodies to be established. With his contacts from Dachau to communists he could – at least to some extent – soften many of the ever-increasing anti-clerical measurements of the communist regime to be established in the East, until the communist rulers of the German Democratic Republic (GDR) finally dropped him in May 1958.

On 18 May 1945 Berlin's provisional city council, newly installed by the Soviet occupational power, had appointed Grüber as advisor for ecclesiastical affairs. This earned him a bilingual Russian-German certificate, issued on 21 May, to spare him from the usual robbery of bikes by Soviet soldiers, so that he could move around the city with a collapsed transportation system, and exempted him from the curfew valid for Germans, issued on 9 July. On 15 July 1945 Dibelius appointed Grüber as Provost of St. Mary's and St. Nicholas' Church in Berlin and invested him on 8 August in a ceremony in St. Mary's Church, only partially cleared from the debris. Thus his time as pastor in Kaulsdorf ended. In 1946 the congregation commissioned the construction of a simple tent roof, covering the tower stump. Grüber's organisation for the relief of the survivors, today named Evangelical Relief Centre for the formerly Racially Persecuted, found new premises in the West Berlin locality of Zehlendorf, so the Grübers moved there in 1949.

Since 1947 the congregation was a member of the Evangelical Church in Berlin-Brandenburg. In 1999 the spire was reconstructed following its original design. Today the tower houses is a small museum.

== Furnishings ==
The square sacristy, a structure extending from the northern façade of the church, contains a cross-ribbed vaulted ceiling from the 15th century. Within the nave there is a baroque wooden pulpit of 1690 with a decorative pulpit ceiling. The retable, created in 1656 and restored in 1958, is structured by columns and tuberous ornaments (German: Knorpelwerk) on the edges (Wangen) and surrounding portrait medaillons, which display Moses and John the Baptist.

The baptismal font of 1695 consists of a sandstone bowl carried by a putto statue. The congregation still owns one of the rare mediaeval oaken chests (early 15th century), once containing its precious belongings.

== Gallery ==
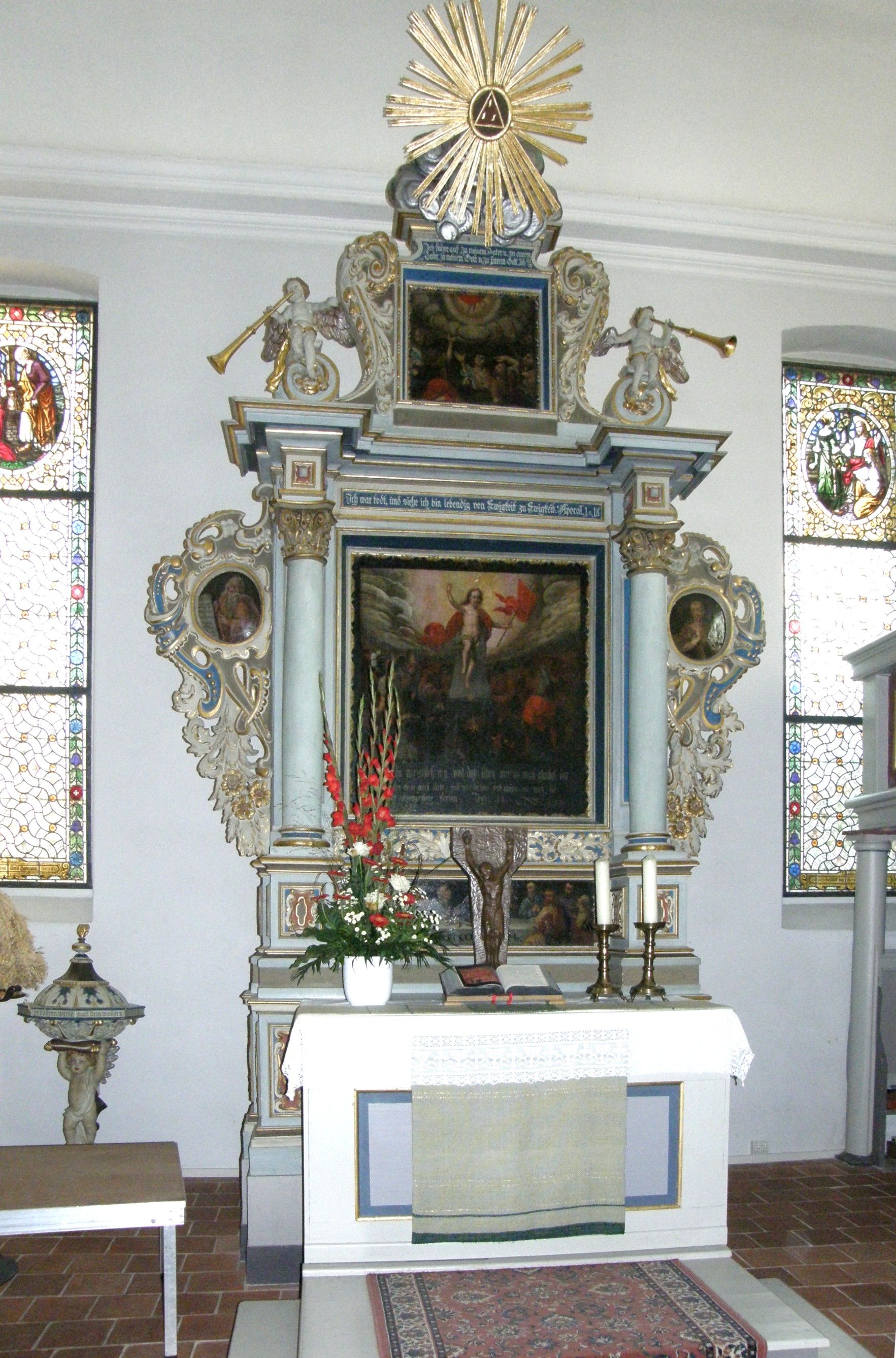
Altar

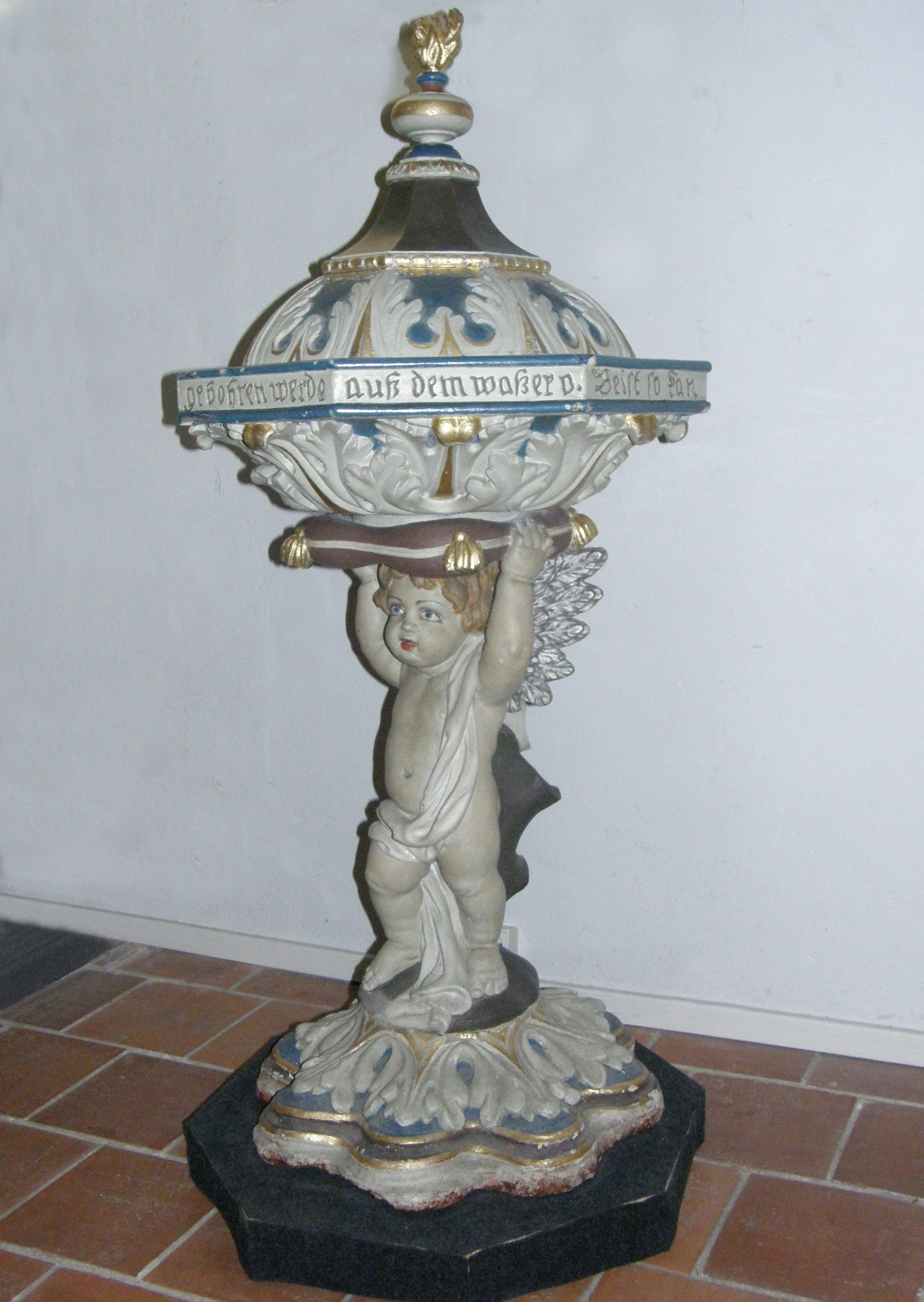
Baptismal font

== Noteworthy parishioners ==
- Heinrich Grüber
