= Caprice bohémien =

Symphonic poem by Sergei Rachmaninoff

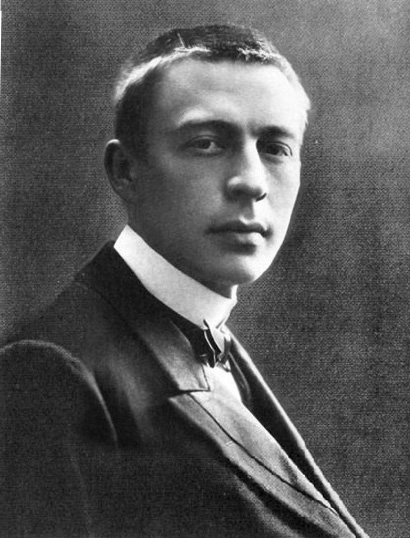
Sergei Rachmaninoff in 1892

Caprice bohémien, Op. 12, also known as the "Capriccio on Gypsy Themes", is a symphonic poem for orchestra composed by Sergei Rachmaninoff from 1892 to 1894.

== History ==
Rachmaninoff began work on the piece in the summer of 1892, writing in August in a letter to his friend, the baritone Mikhail Slonov, that he would write the composition for piano four hands first, and orchestrate it at a later date. Rachmaninoff completed this orchestral version two years later, halfway through the September of 1894. Rachmaninoff dedicated the work to Pyotr Lodyzhensky, the husband of the gypsy Anna Alexandrovna Lodyzhenskaya, to whom he later dedicated his First Symphony. The piece was given its premiere in Moscow, on 22 November 1894, with Rachmaninoff himself conducting, as part of a tour with the violinist Teresina Tua.

Rachmaninoff later went on to form a strong dislike for the piece. In 1908, he called it one of three of his compositions which "frightened" him, and would like to make revisions to, along with his First Piano Concerto and First Symphony, though he didn't ever revise the capriccio. In 1930, he described it as the only one of his works which he would "prefer to disown".

== Structure ==
The work is in the keys of E minor and E major, and is split into three sections. The first section, marked Allegro vivace, opens to the beating of the timpani, with the music developing through slow and dramatic chords voiced by the low woodwinds and mirrored by the low brass. A short interlude in the high winds brings the piece to a vibrant outburst, led by the strings, in a motif echoed multiple times throughout the piece. The middle section of the piece, marked Lento lugubre, is slow and drawn-out, and features a pedal point on E minor. The work's concluding section, in contrast, has the orchestra rebuild to a loud and lively climax, and after a short and powerful respite in B minor, the composition ends in a blaring E major chord.

Rachmaninoff began writing the capriccio shortly after the completion of his opera Aleko, a work similarly centered around gypsy themes, and the piece contains several references to the opera.

The work has been compared to Rimsky-Korsakov's Capriccio espagnol and Tchaikovsky's Capriccio Italien.
