= Violin Sonata No. 2 (Beethoven) =

Violin Sonata No. 2 in A major
I. Allegro vivace

II. Andante, più tosto allegretto

III. Allegro piacevole

The Violin Sonata No. 2 of Ludwig van Beethoven in A major, the second of his Opus 12 set (along with his Violin Sonata No. 1 and Violin Sonata No. 3), was written in 1797–98 and dedicated to Antonio Salieri. It has three movements:

1. Allegro vivace in A major
2. Andante, più tosto allegretto, in A minor
3. Allegro piacevole （A major-D major-A major）

A typical performance lasts approximately 18 minutes.
