= Violin Sonata No. 7 (Beethoven) =

Composition by Ludwig van Beethoven

Violin Sonata
- No. 7
- by Ludwig van Beethoven
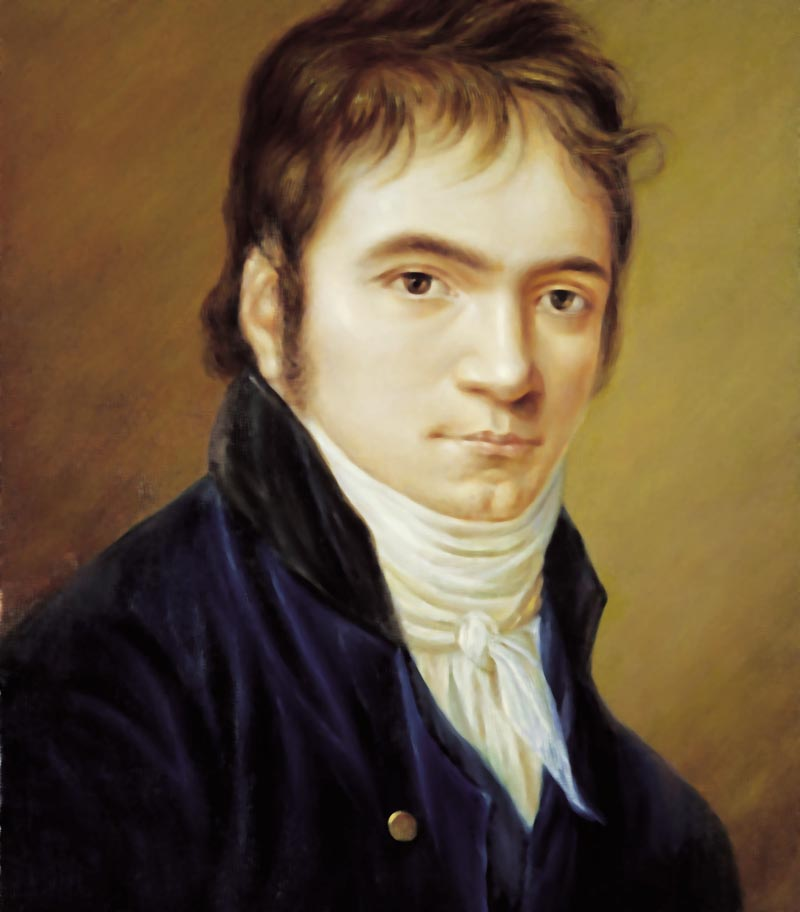
- Ludwig van Beethoven in 1803
- Key: C minor
- Opus: 30
- Composed: 1801–02
- Dedication: Alexander I of Russia
- Published: May 1803
- Duration: 22 minutes
- Movements: 4

The Violin Sonata No. 7 in C minor by Ludwig van Beethoven, the second of his Op. 30 set, was composed between 1801 and 1802, published in May 1803, and dedicated to Tsar Alexander I of Russia. It has four movements:

1. Allegro con brio (in C minor)
2. Adagio cantabile (in A♭ major)
3. Scherzo: Allegro (in C major)
4. Finale: Allegro; Presto (in C minor)

The work's opening movement is the first of Beethoven's sonata first movements that does not repeat the exposition. The development section contains a theme not found in the exposition (this happens in earlier compositions such as the fourth violin sonata also). The work takes approximately 26 minutes to perform.

The second movement was originally sketched out in G major before taking its current form.

According to Anton Schindler (Beethoven's notoriously unreliable associate and biographer), Beethoven came to regret the third movement. Schindler wrote, "He definitely wished to delete the Scherzo allegro... because of its incompatibility with the character of the work as a whole."

The autograph to the sonata turned up in a collection built up by H. C. Bodmer in Zurich, discovered in the mid-20th century.
