= Violin Sonata No. 1 (Beethoven) =

1798 composition by Ludwig van Beethoven

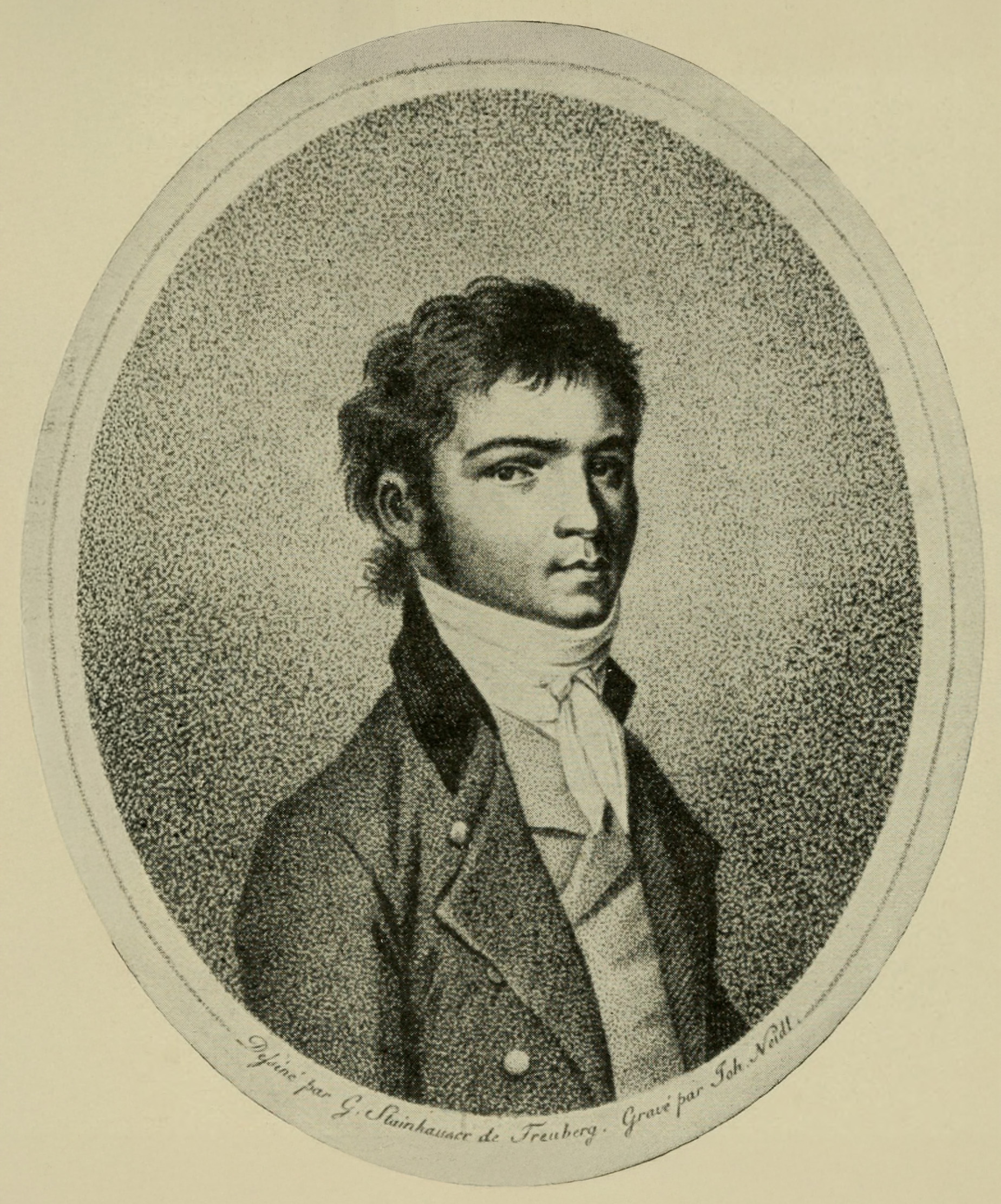
Ludwig van Beethoven, c. 1796

Ludwig van Beethoven's Violin Sonata No. 1 in D major is a violin sonata from his Op. 12 set, along with his Violin Sonata No. 2 and Violin Sonata No. 3. It was written in 1798 and dedicated to Antonio Salieri. Being an early work written around the period when Beethoven studied with Haydn, the sonata is for the most part written in a classical style much like that of Mozart or Haydn.

It has three movements:

1. Allegro con brio
2. Tema con variazioni: Andante con moto
3. Rondo: Allegro

A typical performance lasts approximately 20 minutes.

== Recordings ==
- Fritz Kreisler (violin), Franz Rupp (piano)
- Yehudi Menuhin (violin), Wilhelm Kempff (piano)
- Itzhak Perlman (violin), Vladimir Ashkenazy (piano)
- Kristóf Baráti (violin), Klára Würtz (piano)
- Leonidas Kavakos (violin), Enrico Pace (piano)
- Pamela Frank (violin), Claude Frank (piano)
- David Oistrakh (violin), Lev Oborin (piano)
- Jascha Heifetz (violin), Emmanuel Bay (piano)
- Alina Ibragimova (violin), Cédric Tiberghien (piano)

== Media ==
Violin Sonata No. 1 in D major, 3rd movement (5:04)
Performed by Carrie Rehkopf (violin)
