= Tabor Church (Berlin-Hohenschönhausen) =

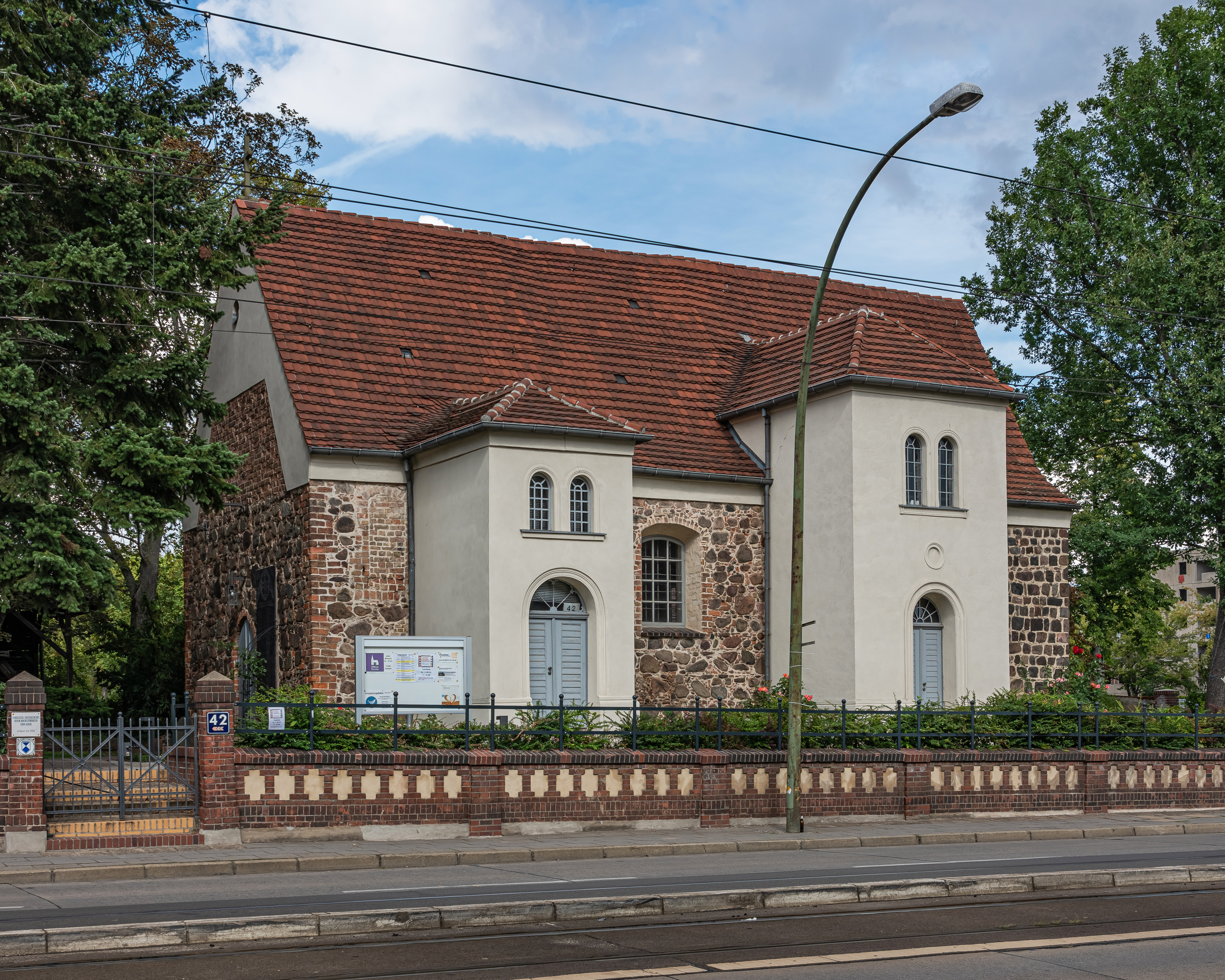
- Façade to Hauptstraße seen from southwest

Religion
- Affiliation: United Protestant since the 19th century, originally Roman Catholic, then Lutheran from 1539 on
- District: Sprengel Berlin, Kirchenkreis Berlin Nord-Ost
- Province: Evangelical Church of Berlin-Brandenburg-Silesian Upper Lusatia

Location
- Location: Alt-Hohenschönhausen, a locality of Berlin
- Interactive map of Tabor Church
- Coordinates: 52°32′55″N 13°30′27″E

Architecture
- Style: Romanesque, Gothic
- Completed: quire 13th century, prayer hall around 1450
- Materials: small boulders and red brick

Tabor Church (Hohenschönhausen) (German: Taborkirche) is the church of the Evangelical Berlin-Hohenschönhausen Congregation, a member of today's Protestant umbrella organisation Evangelical Church of Berlin-Brandenburg-Silesian Upper Lusatia (under this name since 2004). The church building is located in the Berlin borough of Lichtenberg, in the locality of Alt-Hohenschönhausen. The church was named in memory of the Transfiguration of Jesus, which allegedly took place on Mount Tabor (Hebrew: הר תבור) in today's Israel.

The congregation's parish comprises the area of the historical village of Hohenschönhausen, which was incorporated into Berlin under the Prussian Greater Berlin Act in 1920. Between 1985 and 2001 the area was part of the eponymous former borough of Hohenschönhausen.

== As a Roman Catholic place of worship (until 1539) ==
Tabor Church is by far the oldest still existing building in the locality. The church is oriented and was built in the late 13th century, or possibly earlier, around 1230. That is about 100 years earlier than the first recorded mentions of the former village (in 1352 and 1356).

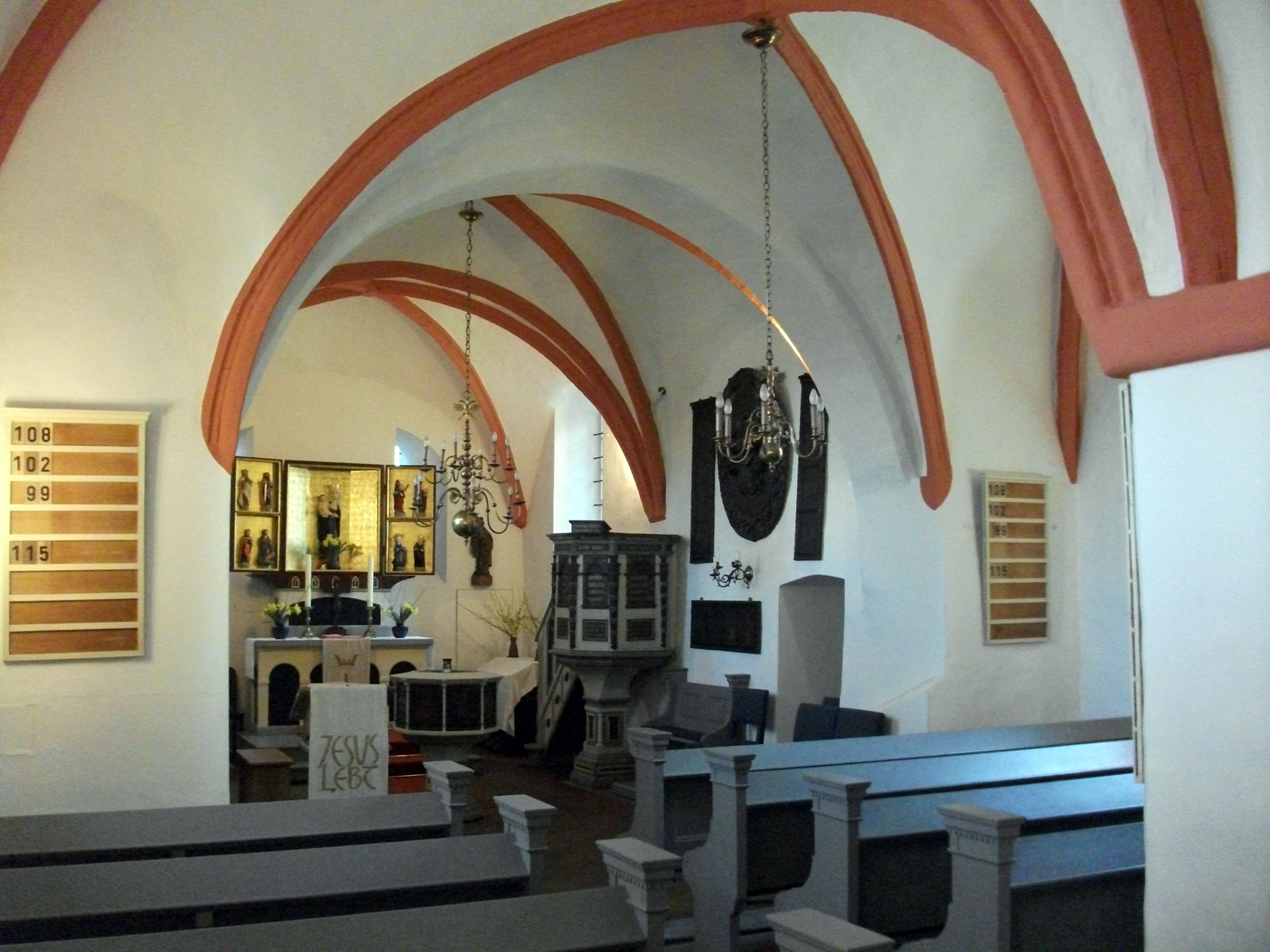
View through the nave

The oldest surviving section of the church is its 13th-century choir, built from granite ashlars in late Romanesque style with a rib vault. In 1352 – as preserved in a document – Heinrich Billerbeck, the "rector ecclesie in alta schonehusen" (parson of the church in Hohenschönhausen), unmasked a man pretending to be the late Waldemar 'the Great' of the Margraviate of Brandenburg, declared dead in 1320.

The present prayer hall of two naves is an addition of about 1450 erected from simple boulders and with a vaulted roof supported by a central square pier. Around 1470 a half-timbered tower was attached to the southern side of the church. In 1480 the von Röbel family was enfeoffed with the manor estate of Hohenschönhausen, thus also holding the ius patronatus to the church.

== As a Lutheran place of worship (from 1539 on) ==
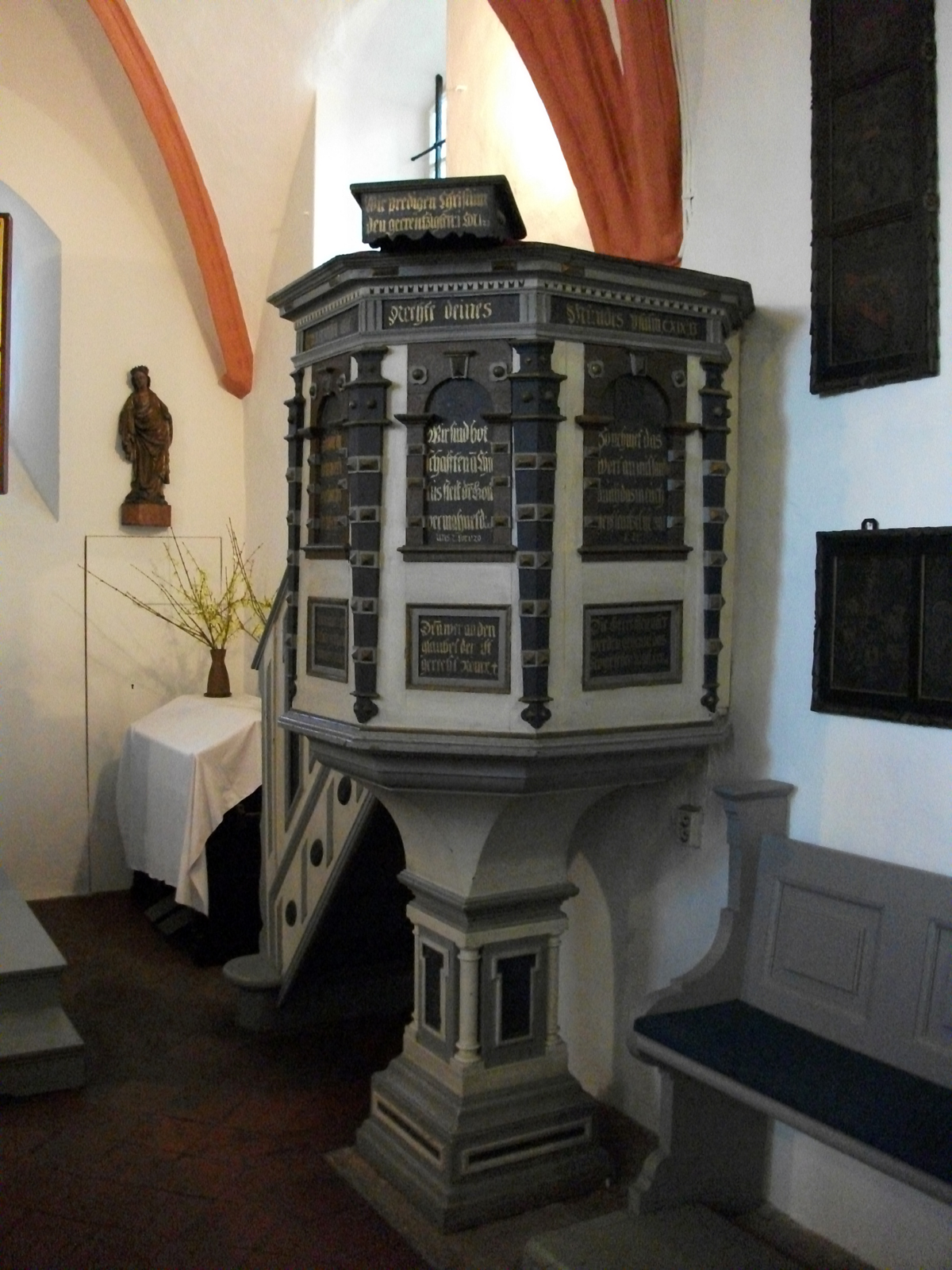
Pulpit, early 17th century

In 1539 Prince Elector Joachim II Hector converted from Catholicism to Lutheranism, as many of his subjects had earlier done. The church thus became Lutheran too, like most of the electoral subjects and all the churches in the Electorate of Brandenburg. In 1615 the tower underwent its first total reconstruction, followed by further repairs and new buildings at least once every century.

In 1626 – in the course of the Thirty Years' War (1618–1648) – the Lutheran Swedish troops under Gustavus II Adolphus and the Catholic Imperial Army under Wallenstein ravaged Hohenschönhausen and plundered the church. Out of ten farmer families, three cottager families, and two shepherd families in the parish (as of 1624) only three families holding farms and five merely holding cottages survived (as of 1652).

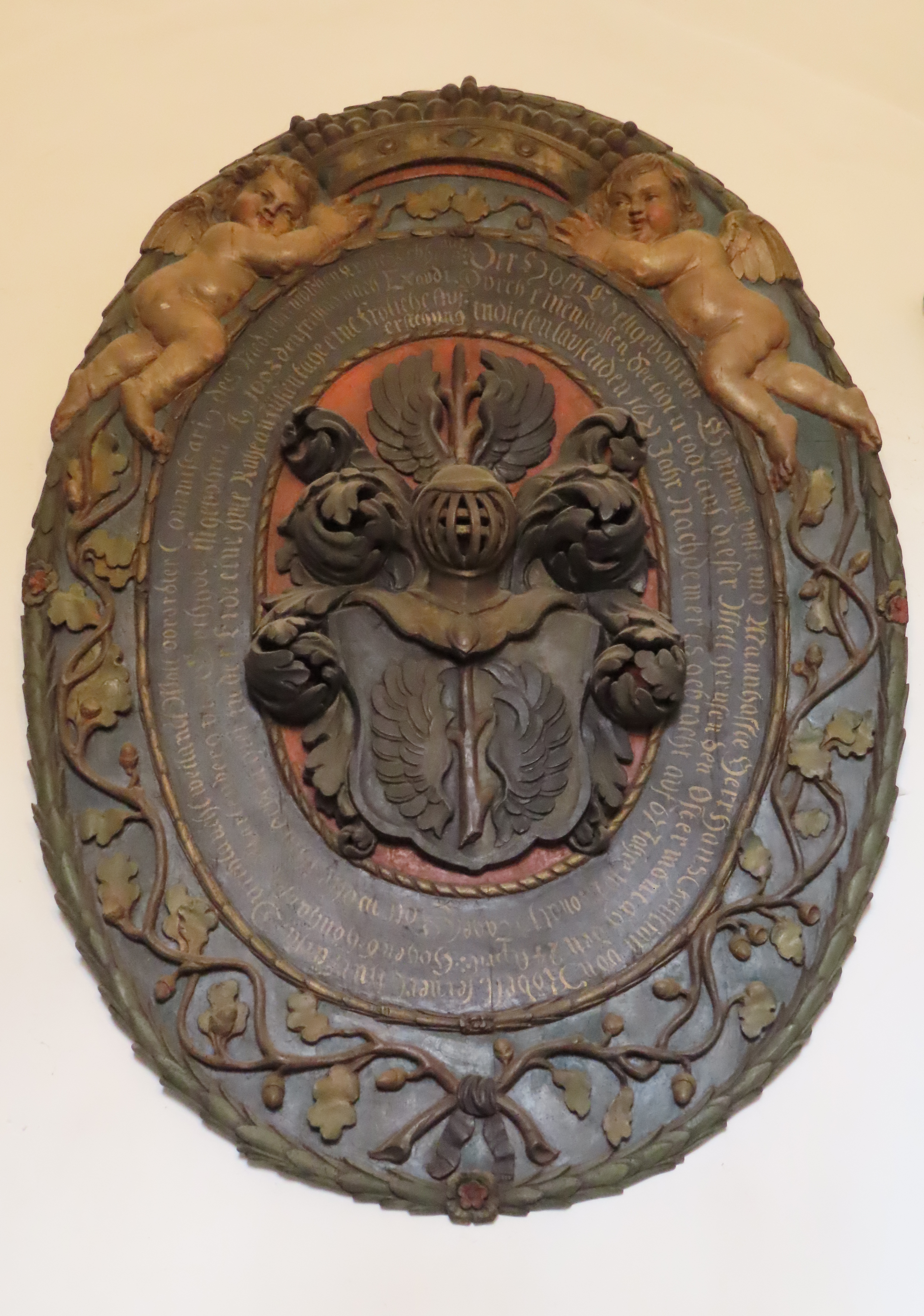
Epitaph for patron Hans Christoph von Röbel, d. 1671

In 1714 the peaked spire gave way to a domed top with a weathervane. In 1736 Christian Friedrich von Röbel sold the manor estate for 22,800 thalers to Adam Ebersbach, a merchant from Berlin. The latter thus became the patron of the church and financed its renovation in 1738.

During the reign of King Frederick 'the Great', the cemetery around the church – like all cemeteries – had to be planted with mulberry trees. Their leaves were to be picked by village schoolchildren and delivered for use in the loss-making silk production the king tried to enforce in his dirigist concept of cameralism. The last mulberry tree fell in the 1980s. After Orussia's loss in the Battle of Kunersdorf on 12 August 1759 (in the course of the Third Silesian or Seven Years' War, 1756–1763, the European chapter of Anglo-French and Indian War), Austrian and Russian soldiers robbed what they considered precious from the inventory of the church.

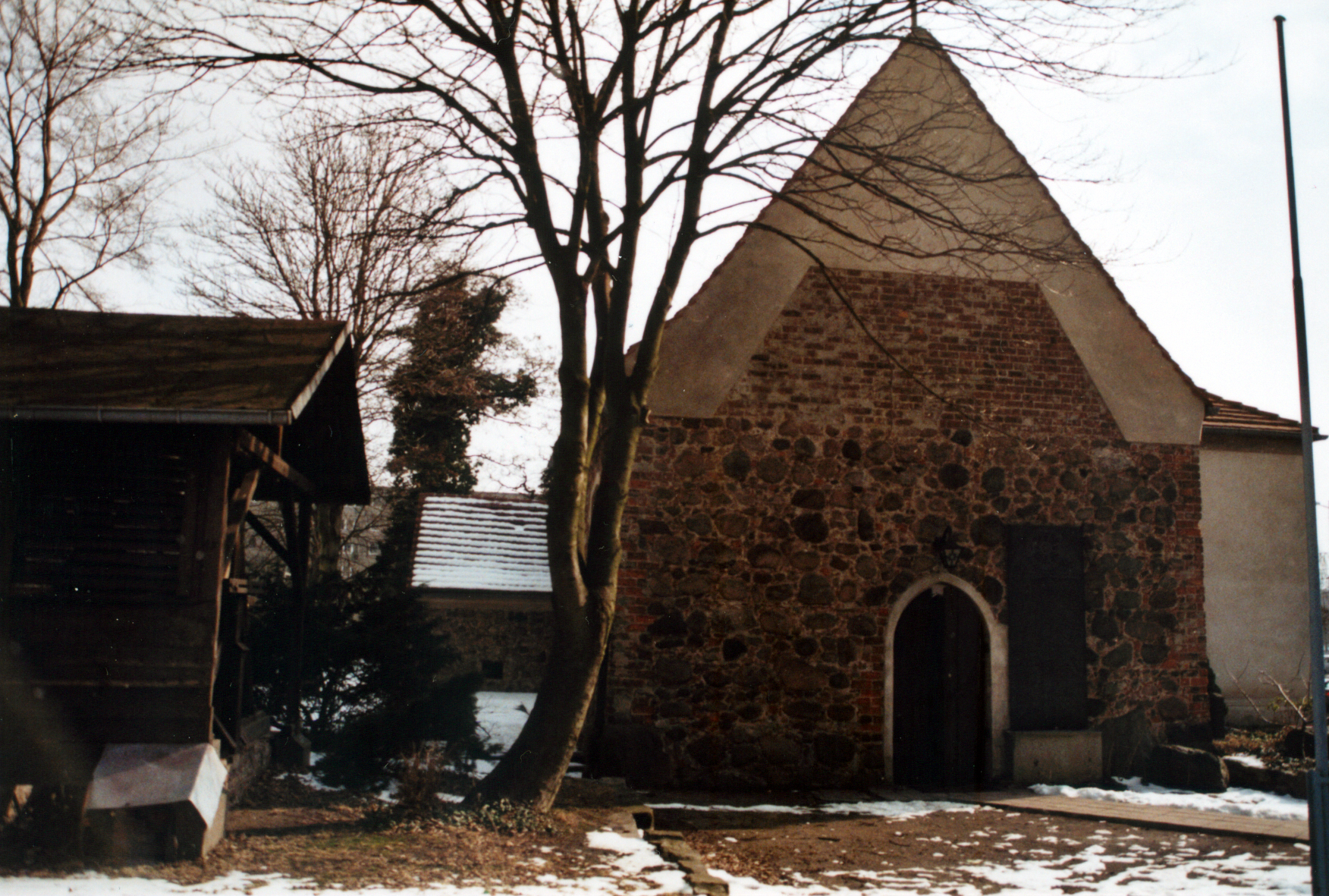
Tabor Church – western façade of small boulders and partially plastered brick gable

In 1817, under the auspices of King Frederick William III of Prussia, the Lutheran congregation of Hohenschönhausen, like most Prussian Protestant congregations, joined the common umbrella organisation then called the Evangelical Church in Prussia (under this name since 1821), with each congregation either maintaining its former denomination or adopting the new united denomination. In 1905 the church was renovated and renamed Tabor Church, but the name 'village church' (German: Dorfkirche) also continued to be used.

The church weathered the Second World War intact. In 1945 Hohenschönhausen fell within the Soviet-controlled Eastern Sector of Berlin. Since 1947 the congregation has been a member of the Evangelical Church of Berlin-Brandenburg. In 1952 the congregation had to demolish the dilapidated domed top of the tower because in the communist planning system – even seven years after the war – there was a shortage of construction material, at least if needed for a church building. The south tower has since been a stump.

== Furnishings ==
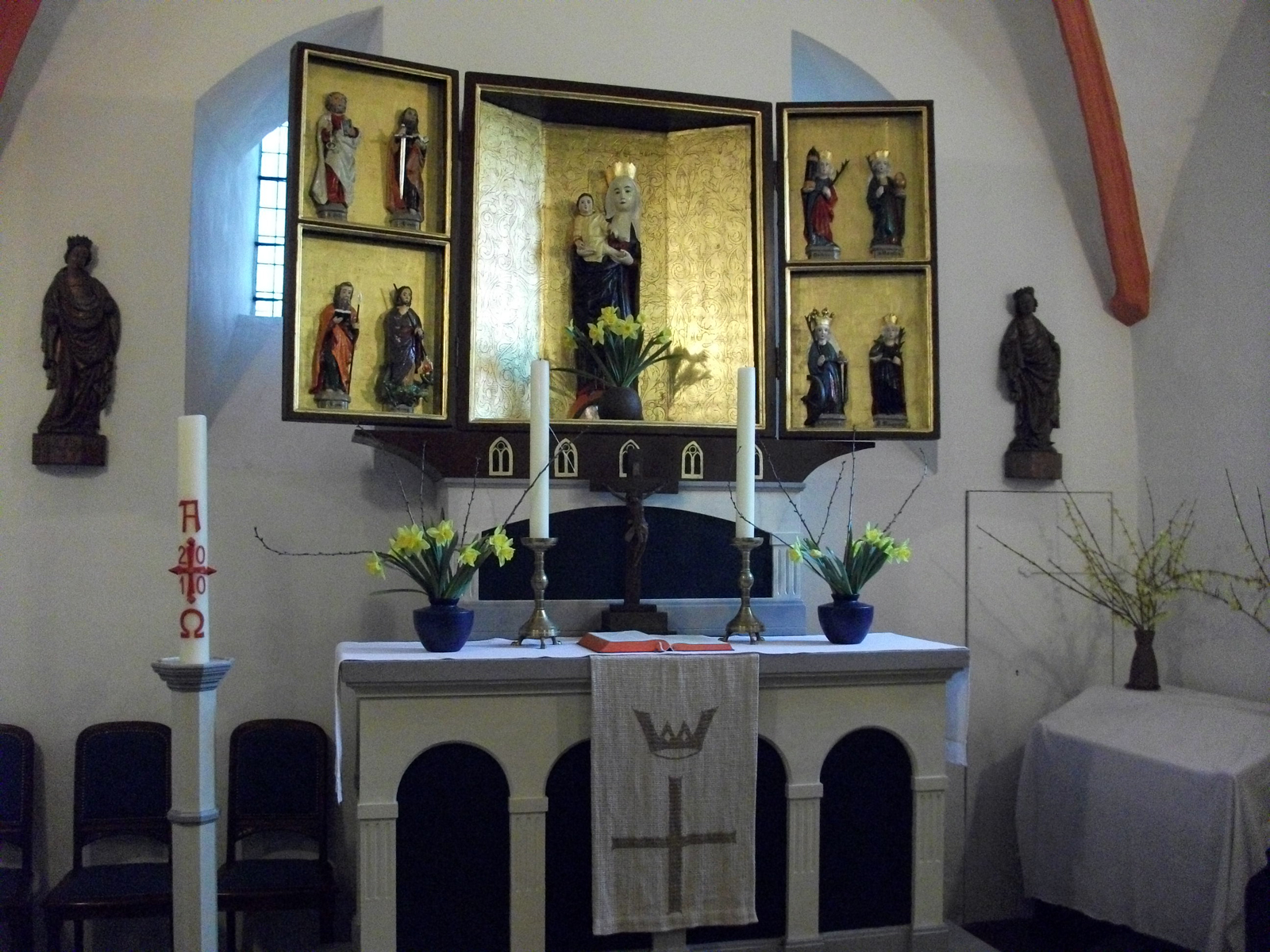
Altar

The original altar, depicting Mary(am) of Nazareth, was translated in 1924 to St. Nicholas' Church in Berlin's central borough of Mitte and is now exhibited in the Märkisches Museum. In the same year Tabor Church received in return a wooden altar (of the last quarter of the 15th century) from the village church in Berlin-Wartenberg, showing the carved sculptures of Mary(am) of Nazareth with the infant Jesus in the central field, flanked by two bipartite folding flaps with sculptures of Saints. The pulpit dates to the early 17th century and is decorated with diamond-styled Herms pilasters.

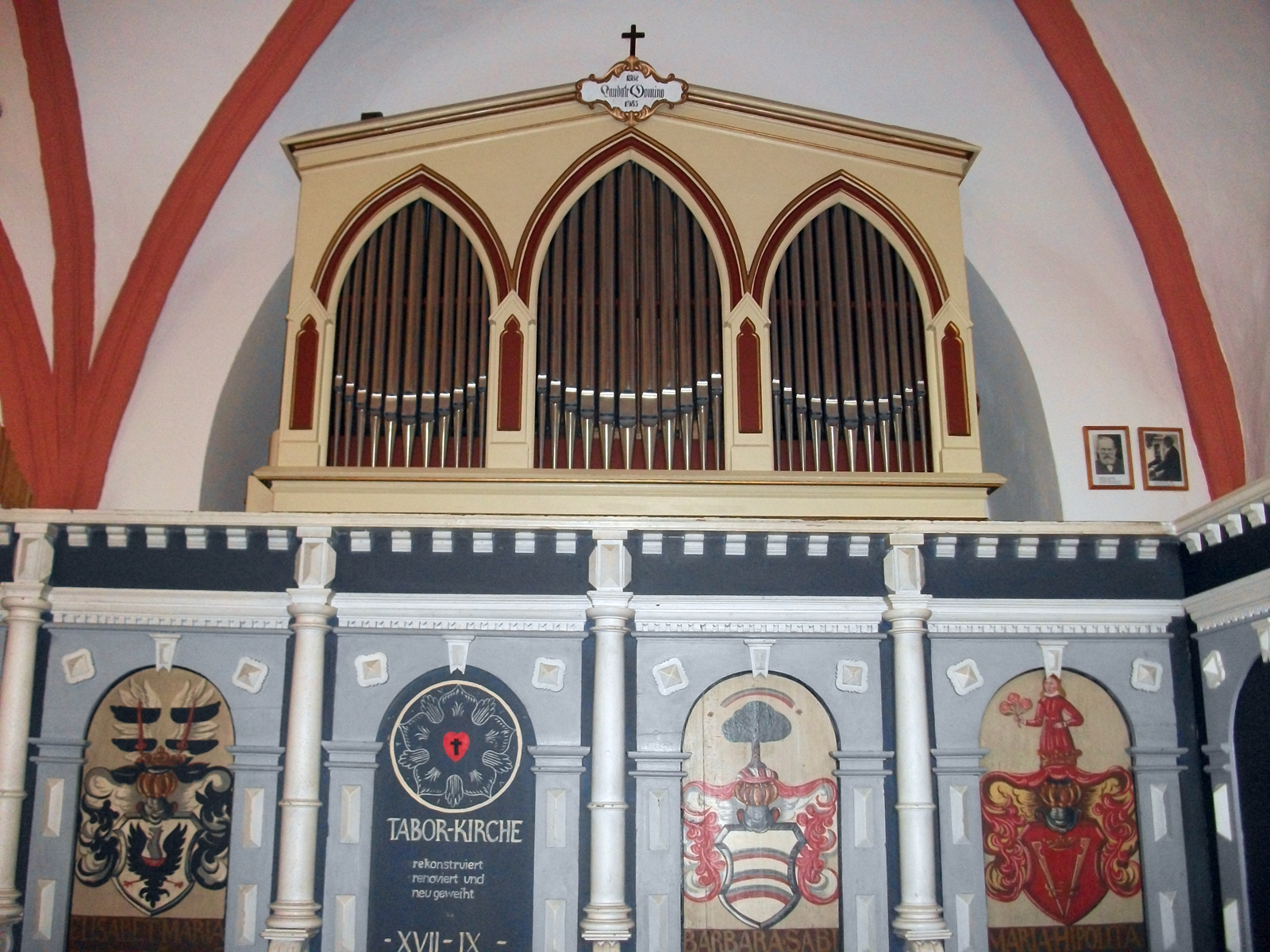
Organ and parapet of the loft

The christening bowl of 1671 shows the arms of the von Röbel family, who donated it. The parapet of the organ loft (17th century) features vivid flat carvings and again the arms of the von Röbel family. Two further sculptures of female saints (around 1430) belong to the furnishings. An oval epitaph commemorates Hans Christoph von Röbel (d. 1671). On the eastern outside wall, four plates recall the four major restructurings of the church in 1738, 1801, 1905, and 1924.
