= Violin Sonata No. 3 (Beethoven) =

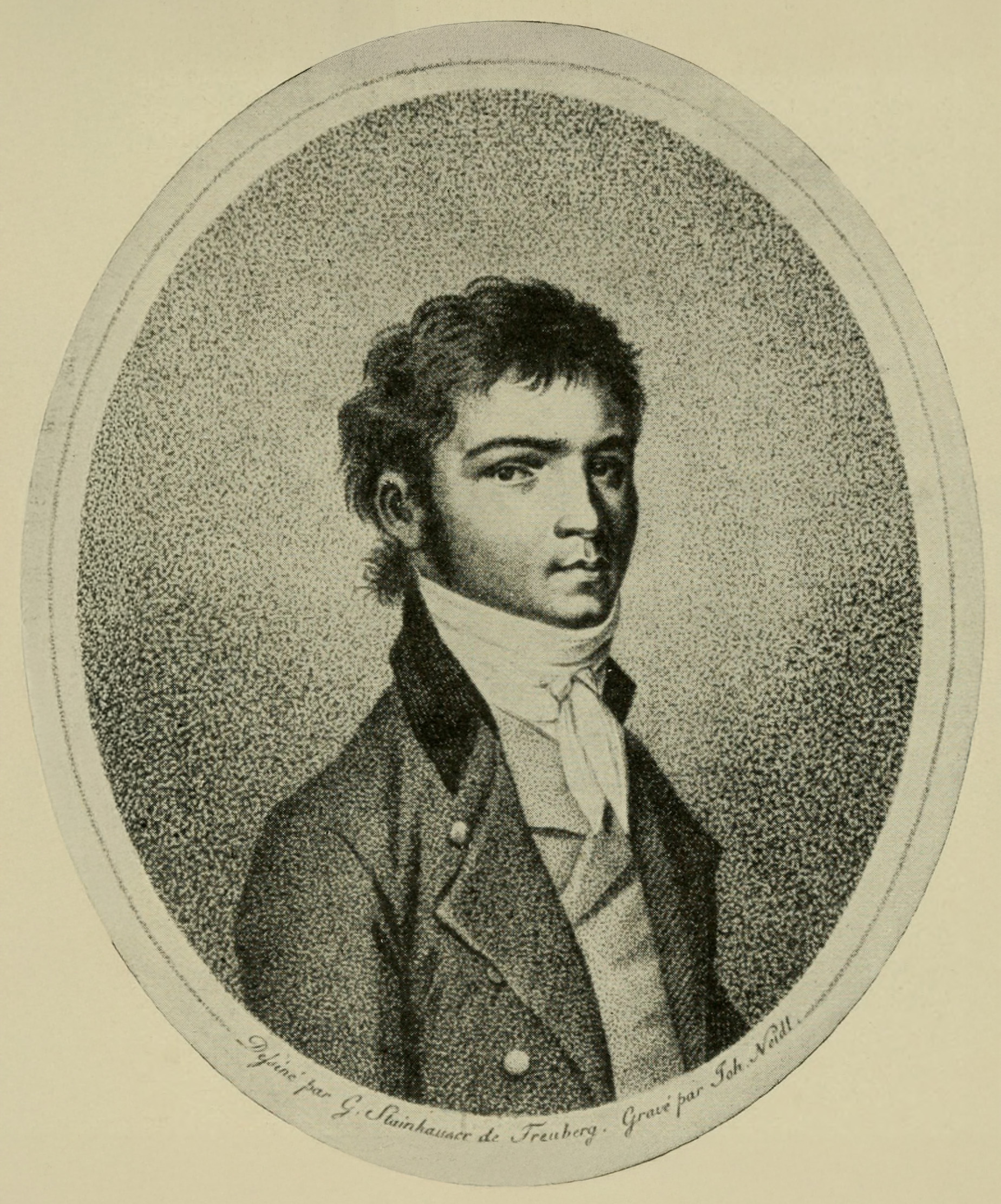
Ludwig van Beethoven, c. 1796

The Violin Sonata No. 3 of Ludwig van Beethoven in E♭ major, the third of his Opus 12 set, was written in 1798 and dedicated to his teacher Antonio Salieri. It has three movements:

1. Allegro con spirito
2. Adagio con molta espressione, in C major
3. Rondo: Allegro molto

The work takes approximately 18 minutes to perform.
