= Night music (Bartók) =

Musical style of composer Béla Bartók

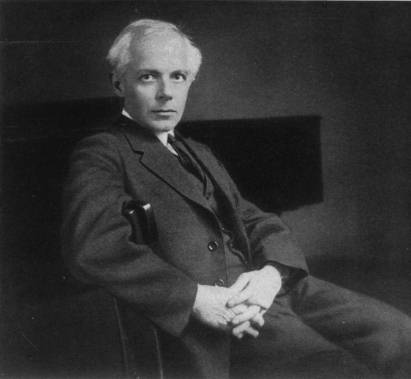
Béla Bartók in 1927

Night music is a musical style of the Hungarian composer Béla Bartók that he used mostly in slow movements of multi-movement ensemble or orchestra compositions in his mature period. It is characterized by "eerie dissonances providing a backdrop to sounds of nature and lonely melodies".

== Characteristics ==
As with many musical styles, it is not possible to make a satisfying let alone indisputable definition of Night music. Bartók did not say or explain much about this style, but he approved of the term and used it himself. Most of the works in Night music style do not carry a title. From an audience point of view, Night music consists of those works or passages that convey to the listener the sounds of nature at night". This is quite subjective and self-referential. Mostly, subjective and far-fetched descriptions are available: "quiet, blurred cluster chords and imitations of the twittering of birds and croaking of nocturnal creatures", "In an atmosphere of hushed expectancy, a tapestry is woven of the tiny sounds of nocturnal animals and insects." More concrete is "Eerie dissonances providing a backdrop to sounds of nature and lonely melodies".

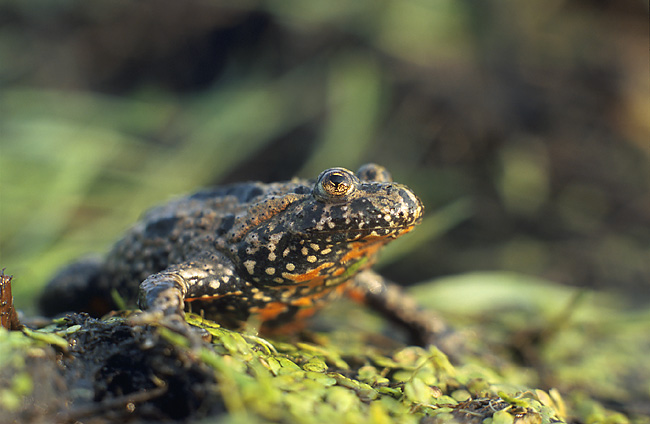
The Hungarian Unka frog Bombina bombina, whose call is imitated in The Night's Music. After making a first noisy appearance in bar 6, he features throughout the piece, disrespecting metre and tonality, ribbiting for the last time in bar 70 before finally hopping off.

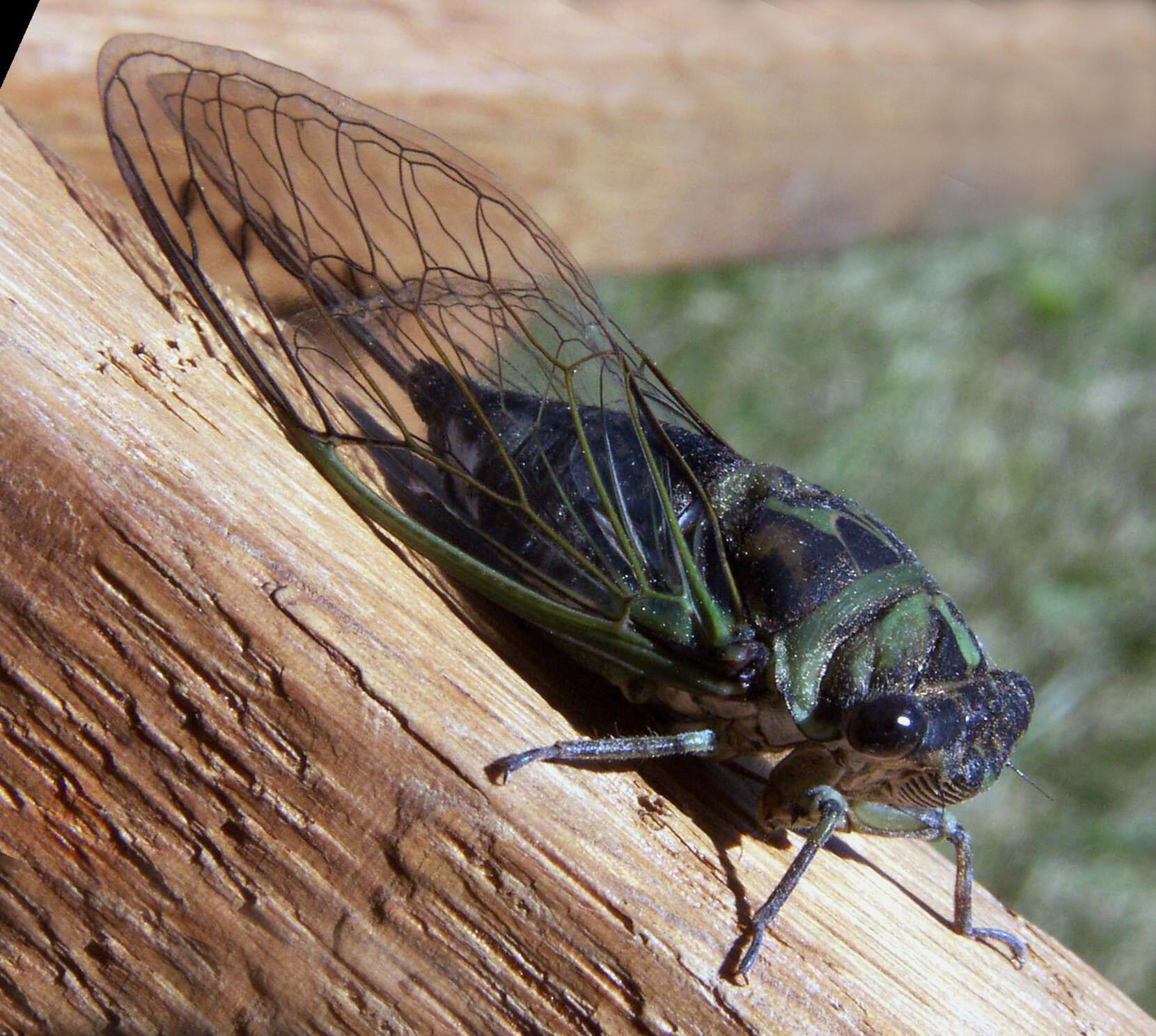
A cicada, Tibicen linnei, the sound of which features in night music

Instead of an attempt at defining, a list of characteristics of "Night music" is more useful.

1. Sound portrayal as opposed to traditional melody and harmony. An example of Bartók's focus on sound quality are the minute directions on how the percussion instruments in the Sonata for two pianos and percussion have to be played. This sound portrayal includes:
  1. The direct imitations of natural sounds, mostly of nocturnal animals. Also the term nature music is sometimes used. Milan Kundera, in commenting on Bartók's expansion of art music with natural sounds, writes "sounds of nature inspire Bartók to melodic motives of a rare strangeness".
  2. Evocations of the mood of night and spaciousness.
  3. Melodies are portrayed in the music, rather than being a direct means of (self-)expression. For instance, a pastoral flute and its melody are portrayed in The Night's Music from Out of Doors. The effect on the listener is not primarily the esthetic effect of the melody. The melody's effect is rather indirect: the evocation of being out of doors at night in the plain and hearing the shepherd play his melody. In the words of Kundera, not only the natural sounds at night, but also the lonely songs and melodies, far from being a Lied or other self-expression of the composer, find their origin in the external world. In the words of Schneider "Bartók seems to be suggesting musically the old Romantic organicist idea that peasant [and shepherds'] music is a natural phenomenon, a view he expressed in writing on several occasions". He also points out that "the G♯'s [in bar 37, which start as the mere sound of repeated notes and turn into the shepherd's melody] gradually emerge from the myriad of other natural sounds".
2. On a more technical musical level, a piece or movement of night music style may show any of the following characteristics.
  1. An ostinato sound on every beat in the slow prevailing tempo, often this sound is dissonant, and/or a cluster chord. Because of the slow and repetitive nature, these sounds come to fulfill an accompanying or background role.
  2. Curt motives at irregular time intervals within the meter. These motives may be the imitations of the natural sounds or more abstract, often primitive, motives. An example is A–A–A–C–A–A in the second movement of the Sonata for two pianos and percussion. This motive is scored as a quintuplet of sixteenths in 4/4 time on the third beat, plus a sixteenth note on the fourth beat: the last A. As the implied or latent rhythm is 3+2+1, it sounds as an accelerando which evaporates suddenly.
  3. Wide pitch ranges in glissandi, jumps and doublings over many octaves. This contrasts heavily with cluster chords of adjacent notes and trills and may well add to the evocation of spaciousness or loneliness.
  4. Overlap and insertions of widely different materials, e.g. a bird call in a melodic line. Different materials sound irrespective of one another leading to novel sound effects, and, more subjectively, multiple layers and perhaps the feeling of spaciousness.

== Compositions in Night music style ==
Night music developed stepwise and has unclear boundaries. Yet, a list of pieces of Night music can be established, including its precursors. In some cases, it is arguable that only specific sections within a piece or movement are Night music. Danchenka's list (1987) of some works specifies in many entries exactly which bars are Night music. For instance, only the middle section of the Adagio religioso of the Piano Concerto No. 3 is included. However, Gillies (1993) points out how the main melodic material of the opening and closing sections are related to the bird calls of the middle section. As the bird calls could not be modified to match other melodic material, the opening and closing sections had to be directly derived from the bird calls.

- Second Suite for small orchestra Op. 4, Sz. 34, BB 40, mvt. 3, Andante 1905
- Fourteen Bagatelles Op. 6, No.12. 1908
- Fragments of sections and moods in the opera Duke Bluebeard's Castle 1911(−1917)
- Five Songs, Op. 15: No. 5, Here down in the valley (Hungarian: Itt lenn a völgyben) 6 February 1916
- The Miraculous Mandarin, Op. 19. 1918–1924: The section where, in the dark, the mandarin's body glows with an eerie blue-green light.
- Eight Improvisations on Hungarian Peasant Songs, Op. 20, No. 3. 1920
- Dance Suite, mvt. 4, 1923 (and, incidentally, Slovak Dance)
- Lullaby from Village Scenes (Falún) (mvt. 4 of voice version, 1924, mvt. 2 of chamber choir version, May 1926)
- The Night's Music of the five piano pieces Out of Doors, Lento – (un poco) pìu Andante 1926
- Piano Concerto No. 1, mvt. 2, Andante 1926
- String Quartet No. 3, mvt. 1, Moderato 1927
- String Quartet No. 4, mvt. 3, Non troppo lento 1928
- Piano Concerto No. 2, mvt. 2, Adagio – Più adagio – Presto – Tempo I, 1931
- String Quartet No. 5, mvt. 2 Adagio molto and 4 Andante 1934
- Music for Strings, Percussion and Celesta, mvt. 3, Adagio 1936
- Sonata for two pianos and percussion, mvt. 2, Lento, ma non troppo 1937
- Mikrokosmos, No. 107 Melody in the Mist- tranquillo, and No. 144, Minor seconds, Major Sevenths – Lento, published 1940.
- Concerto for Orchestra (Bartók), Introduction of mvt. 1 and mvt. 3, "Elegia", 1943
- Piano Concerto No. 3, mvt. 2, Adagio religioso, 1945
- Sketches for a Viola Concerto, mvt. 2, Adagio religioso, 1945

== Development of Night music in Bartók's output ==
As a modernist composer, Bartók did not compose music as the esthetic expression of human ethics, and as a reserved personality he shunned sentimentality, specifically breaking with 19th-century Romantic music. While he largely based his music in faster tempo on the vitality of folk music, folk music did not provide him with many suitable idioms for slow movements (an exception is e.g. the "sirató" (elegy) middle section of the Piano Sonata (1926)). The development of Night music was influenced by sound effect compositions by Debussy and Ravel as well as pre-Bachian composers like Couperin. Schneider shows the influence of the Hungarian style of musical depictions of nature, night and the vast open space by the Hungarian composers Erkel, Mosonyi, Szendy, Weiner, and Dohnányi. Close family of Bartók agree that inspiration for Night music came from summer nights at Szőllőspuszta, where Bartók visited his sister from 1921 onwards. This estate lies in Békés county in the Great Hungarian Plain, Nagy Alföld.

The Song op. 15, No. 5 Here down in the valley is a song in the Lied tradition. Consequently, nature is not objectively portrayed as it is in Night music but nature mirrors the emotions of the subject. Nonetheless, it contains a night music characteristic: arpeggiated clusters of three adjacent notes in the medium and lower registers on the piano, played forte. The text is not particularly strong, but greater forces than artistic value (let alone reason) formed the inspiration: Bartók was madly in love with the poetess.

INTERMEZZO The genesis of Here down in the Valley

Starting in the summer of 1915, Bartók (by that time 34 years old) undertook collection trips of Slovakian folk music in the country while staying in the mansion of Gombossy, the chief forester of the comitatus Zólyom, near the town of Kisgaram (now Hronec in central Slovakia). The forester had a fourteen-year-old daughter, Klára, whom Denijs Dille later described as of lively intelligence and openness of character and at fourteen coquettish, strong-willed and mischievous. She went along on Bartók's trips and although she played piano, we can assume that her stimulating support soon extended beyond the musical level. She was not only musically but also literary inclined and showed the composer a number of her poems, all in a late Romantic style: pathetic, egocentric, sentimental, hysteric. In short, entirely alien to Bartók's modernism. Nonetheless, Bartók was quite impressed. In a single day, on 6 February 1916, he wrote the music to one of them, "Here down in the valley". Given the text, the traditional Lied was a better idiom than a fully modernist song. Bartók is said to have been ready to leave his wife and his five-year-old son to marry Klára. She refused, even her friend Wanda Gleiman, author of one song in Op. 15, could not convince her. By October 1916 he ended his correspondence with Klára. Much later Bartók admitted the texts of his songs Op. 15 are "not particularly good"; Klára's spell had worn off. He wanted to publish them but only if his publisher would not mention the authors of the texts. As his publisher was afraid of copyright breach, it was left unpublished until 1958. In the first editions Bartók himself and the accomplished hungarian poet Ady Endre were suggested as the hidden text writer. Denijs Dille discovered the true authorship from interviews with both girls in the late 1970s, shortly before their deaths.

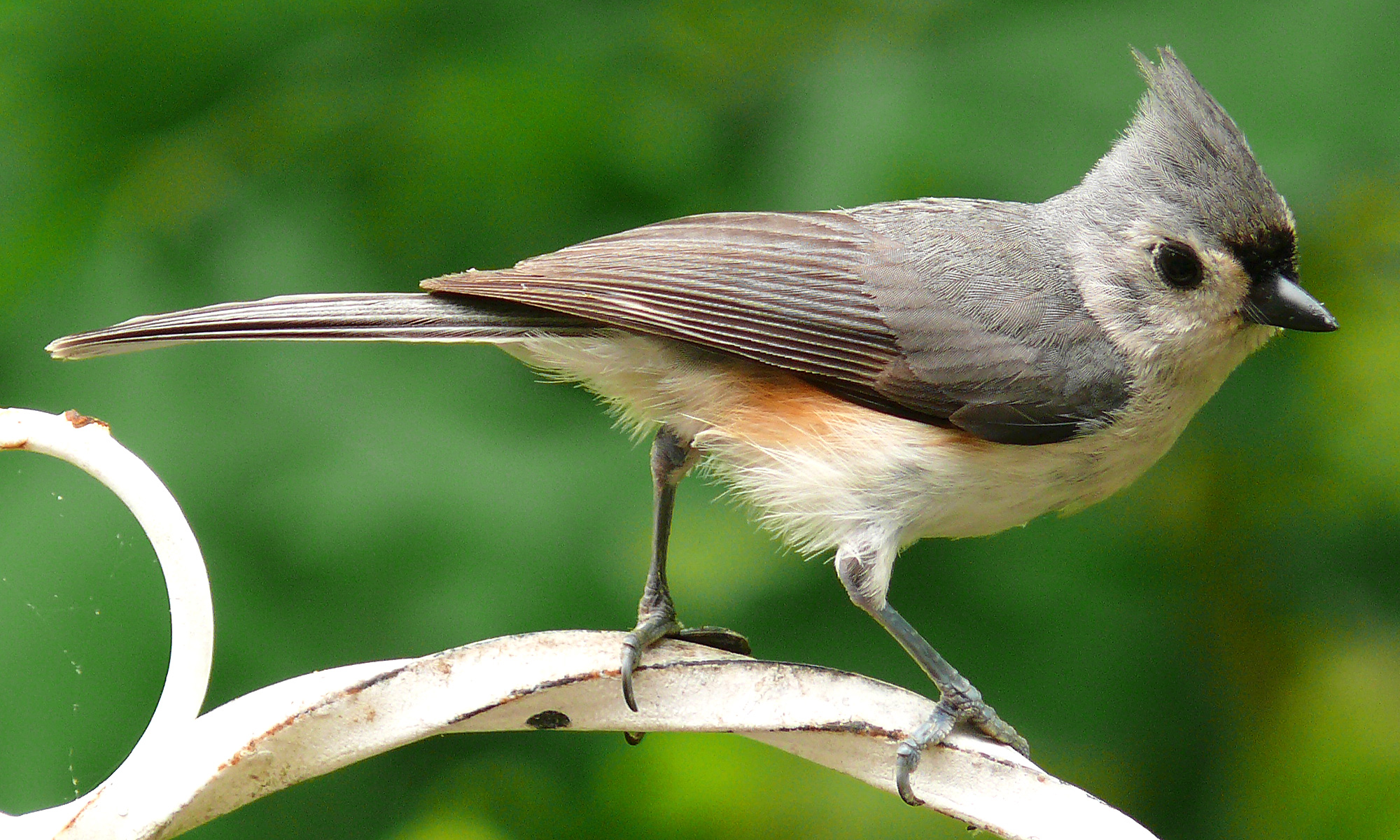
A tufted titmouse, Baeolophus bicolor, which Bartók heard in spring 1945 in North Carolina, and the sound of which features in the night music of his third piano concerto

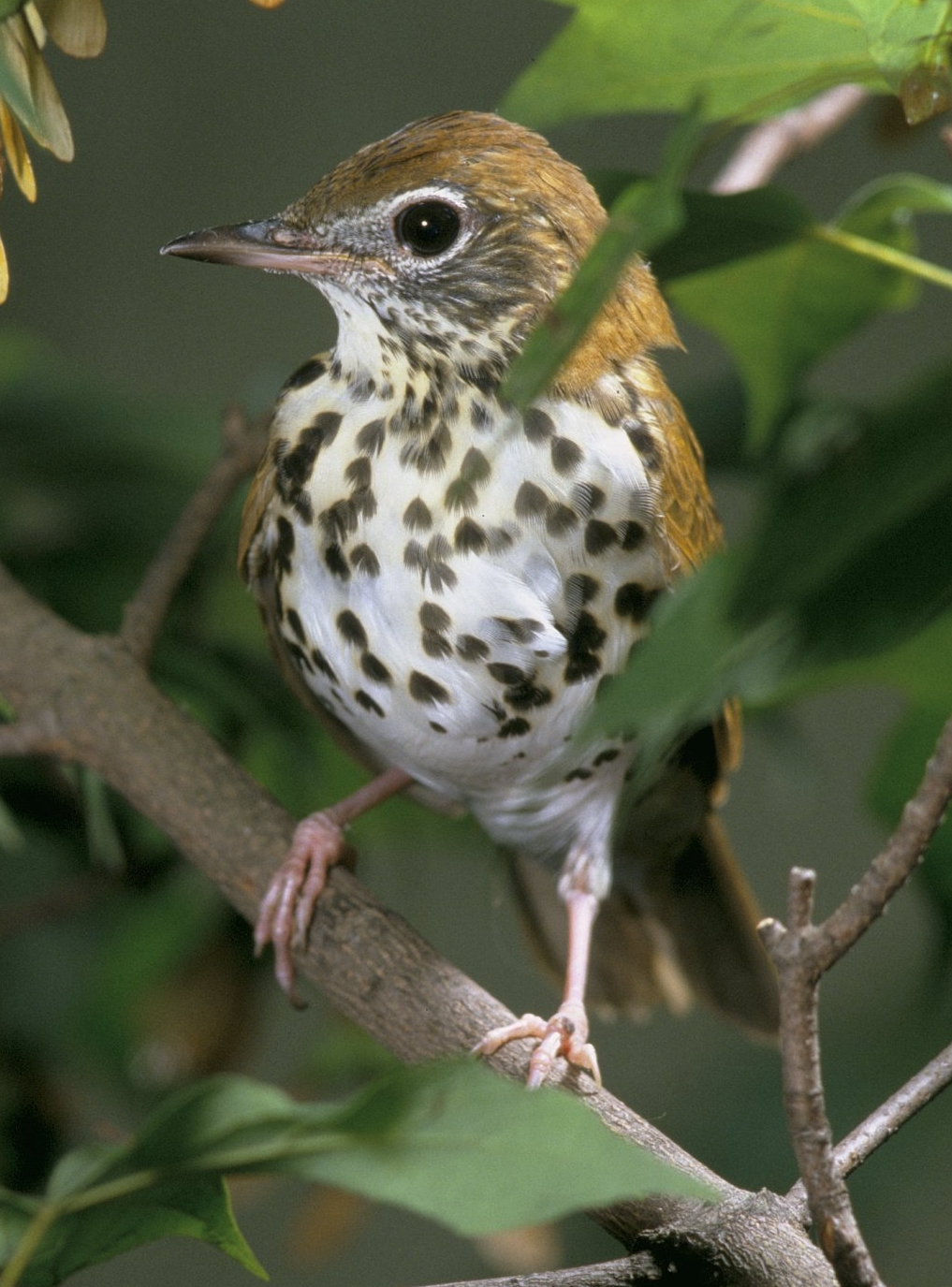
A wood thrush, Hylocichla mustelina, which Bartók heard in North Carolina, and the sound of which features in his third piano concerto

The first composition in fully developed Night music style, "the locus classicus of a uniquely Bartókian contribution to the language of musical modernism", is the fourth piece of the Out of Doors set for solo piano, the instrument he knew best (June 1926). This piece is called The Night's Music and bestowed its name on the entire style. Despite its immediate success, Bartók realised the piano is ill-suited for compositions of overlapping, widely differing musical textures. Therefore, he employed ensembles and orchestras for his further compositions in mature Night music style: slow movements of, among others, concerti and string quartets. Bartók wrote only two more solo piano pieces of night music type: Mikrokosmos No. 107 Melody in the Mist and No. 144, Minor seconds, major sevenths.

Melody in the Mist is technically really quite easy) but shows a number of characteristics of Night music. There is an overlapping alteration of "Mist": a block chord of G-A-C-D around middle C, going up and down in semitones; and an unaccompanied "lonely" "Melody" from "the external world": a mostly pentatonic (Hungarian Old style(!)) melody with pitch inventory G-A-C-D-F (F once changed to leading tone F♯), unaccompanied and sometimes doubled at a distance of one or two octaves. At the end the block chord of G-A-C-D and that very chord but a semitone up (G♯-A♯-C♯-D♯) sound simultaneously.

One of Bartók's most performed pieces is his Concerto for Orchestra. The opening bars present a theme of rising fourths in cellos and basses, answered by tremolando strings and fluttering flutes in Bartók's characteristic "Night music" style. Trumpets, pianissimo, chant a pungent, short-phrased chorale [...] Bartók described the keystone third movement, "Elegia", as a "lugubrious death-song", in which unsettled "night music" effects alternate with intense, prayerful supplications (again related to the chorale-like material that pervades the first half of the work).

Bartók's last composition that contains Night music style is the slow movement of his third piano concerto, written in August and September 1945. He wrote it when mortally ill, he died 26 September.

The movement opens and closes in an almost Romantic style, the middle section contains sounds of nature. Kundera wrote: The hypersensitive theme, unspeakably melancholic, is contrasted with the other, hyperobjective theme [...]: as if a soul in tears can only find solace in the non-sensitivity of nature. The natural sounds are still mysterious and full of anticipation, but not at all eerie. They are rather peaceful, perhaps light, as if in his last night music, a bright new morning is ready to break.

== Sources ==
- Brown, M. J. E. (1980), The New Grove Dictionary of Music and Musicians (ed. Sadie), London, MacMillan, 1980 (1995), Vol. 13, ISBN 0-333-23111-2, ISBN 978-0333231111.
- Danchenka, Gary. "Diatonic Pitch-Class Sets in Bartók's Night Music". Indiana Theory Review 8, no. 1 (Spring, 1987): 15–55.
- Fosler-Lussier, D. (2007), Music Divided: Bartók's Legacy in Cold War Culture (California Studies in 20th-Century Music), ISBN 978-0-520-24965-3.
- Gillies, M. editor (1993), Bartók Companion. ISBN 0-931340-74-8.
- Harley, M. A. (1995), "Natura naturans, natura naturata" and Bartók's Nature Music Idiom, Studia Musicologica Academiae Scientiarum Hungaricae, T. 36, Fasc. 3/4, Proceedings of the International Bartók Colloquium, Szombathely, July 3–5, 1995, Part I (1995), pp. 329–349, doi:10.2307/902218.
- Kundera, Milan (1993), Les Testaments trahis, Editions Flammarion, ISBN 2-07-073605-9, ISBN 978-2-07-073605-8.
- Schneider, D. (2006), Bartók, Hungary, and the Renewal of Tradition: Case Studies in the Intersection of Modernity and Nationality (California Studies in 20th-Century Music) ISBN 978-0-520-24503-7.
- Yeomans, D. (1988), Bartók for piano. ISBN 0-253-21383-5 (Subtitle: A survey of his solo literature.)
