= Ditta Pásztory-Bartók =

Hungarian pianist (1903 - 1982)

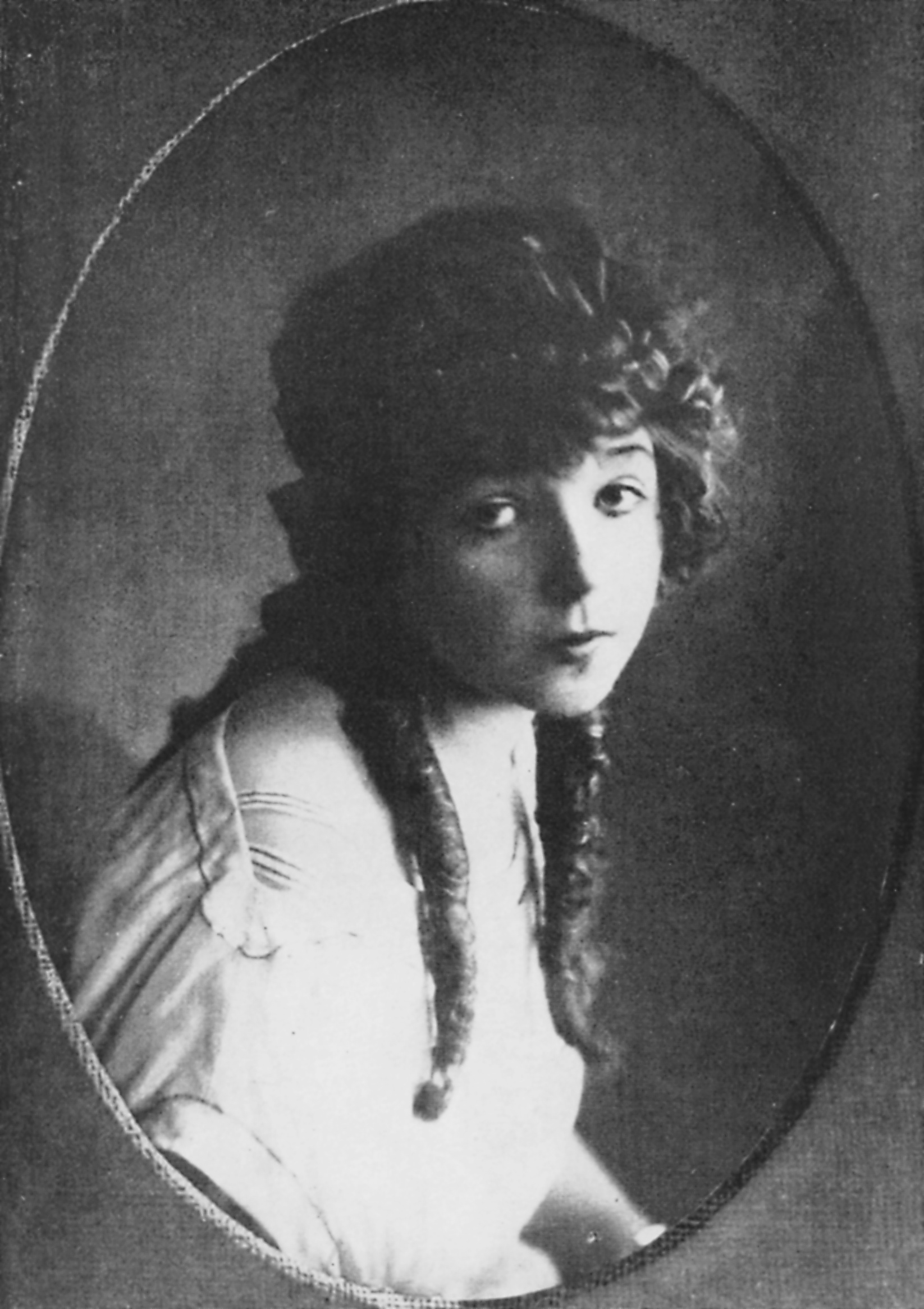

Ditta Pásztory-Bartók (31 October 1903 – 21 November 1982) was a Hungarian pianist and the second wife of the composer Béla Bartók. She was the dedicatee of a number of his works, including Out of Doors and the Third Piano Concerto.

== Biography ==
=== Early life and career ===
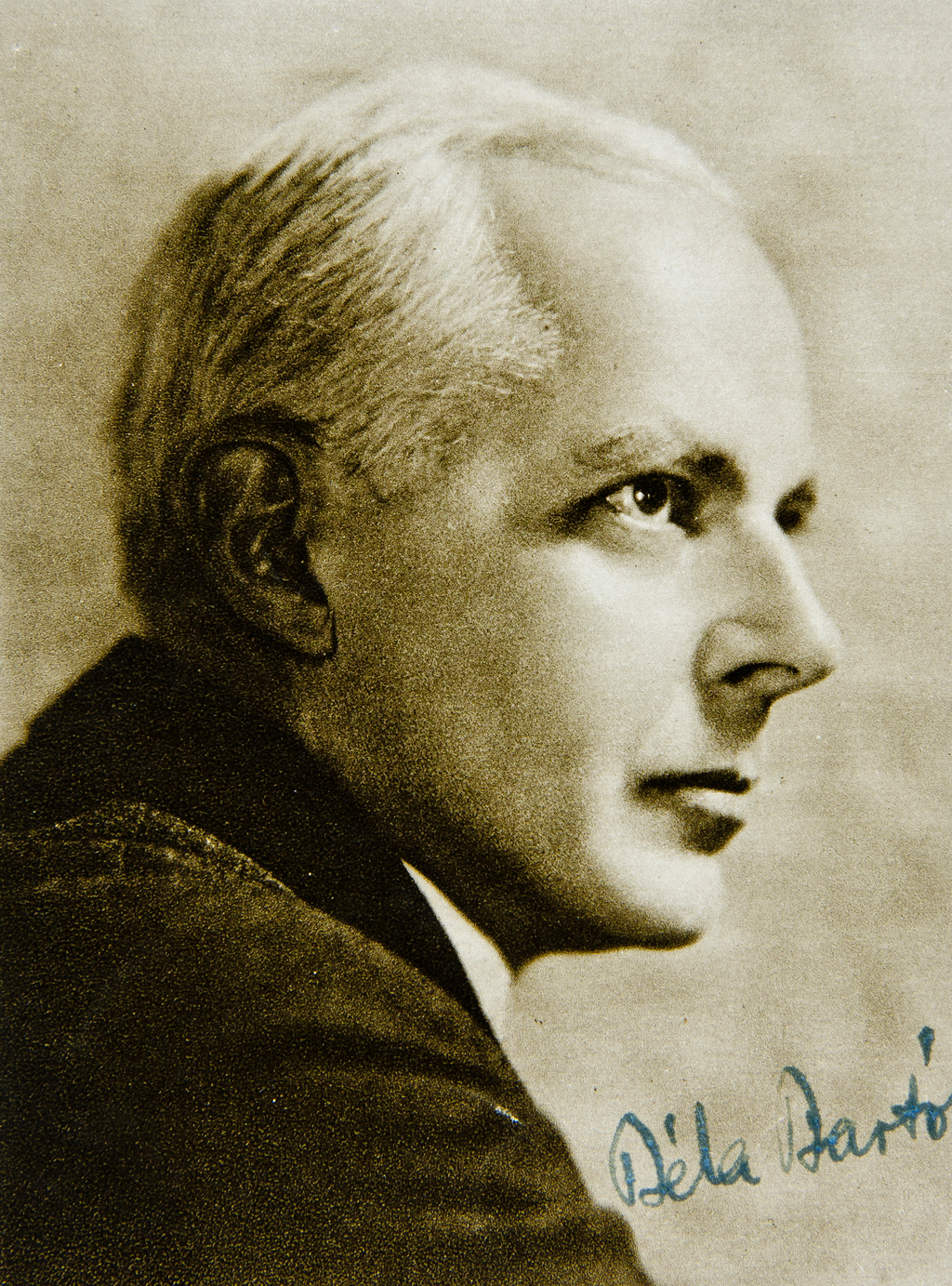
Béla Bartók, 1922.

Edith (Ditta) Pásztory was born in Rimaszombat, Austria-Hungary (now Rimavská Sobota, Slovakia) in 1903, the daughter of a piano teacher and high school teacher. She studied piano at the Budapest Conservatory, gaining her diploma in 1921, and in 1922 went to the Royal Academy of Music for more studies, where she became a private pupil of Béla Bartók.

Bartók divorced his then wife Márta Ziegler (1893-1967) in June 1923. He had a distinct attraction to girls and women considerably younger than himself. Márta was aged only 16 when he married her in 1909, when he was 28. In Ditta's case, she was 19 and he 42. He walked her home after a lesson one day, then out of the blue he proposed to her, giving her three days to make her decision. Up till then, their relationship had been strictly teacher and pupil. She accepted, they obtained a special licence and were married within a week, on 28 August 1923. In 1924 she gave birth to Peter Bartók, her only child but her husband's second son (after Bela Bartók III in 1910). In 1926, Béla Bartók dedicated his suite Out of Doors to Ditta.

She abandoned her own solo career, but became her husband's piano duo partner. Along with the percussionists Saul Goodman and Henry Deneke, Béla and Ditta Pásztory-Bartók jointly premiered his Sonata for Two Pianos and Percussion on 16 January 1938 at the ISCM anniversary concert in Basel, Switzerland. They undertook further duo-piano concerts throughout Europe. In 1940 he made a two-piano arrangement of seven of the pieces from Mikrokosmos, to provide some additional repertoire for him and Ditta to play. That year they emigrated to the United States to escape Nazism. Their final concert was in Budapest on 8 October 1940. They arrived in New York City on 29/30 October.

=== In the United States ===
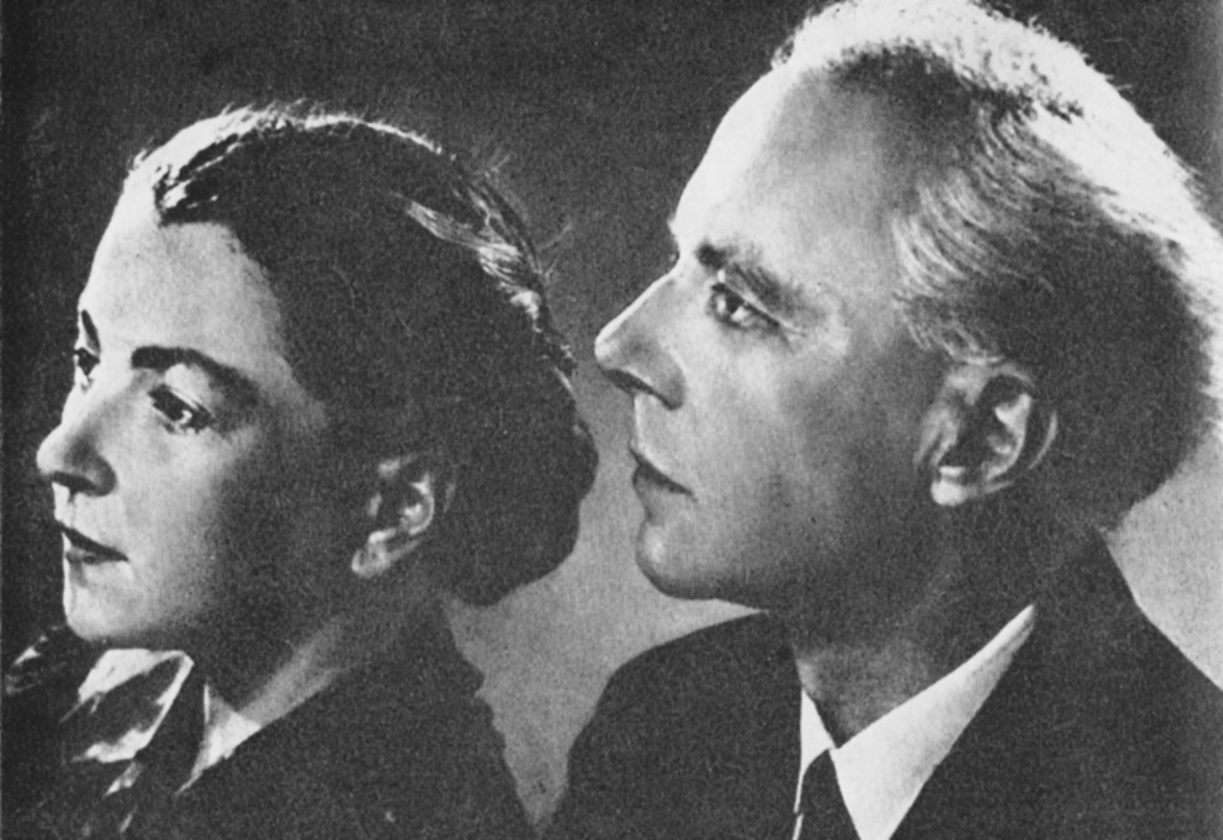
Bartok and Pásztory

In America, their life was characterised by financial hardship, cultural and social isolation, and lack of artistic satisfaction. In contrast to Béla, who was fluent in English, German, Russian, and other languages, Ditta could not speak or understand any English and had to rely on her husband to act as her translator. Bartók's music was not being played by orchestras or chamber ensembles, and he and Ditta were in little demand as pianists. During that time, Bartók developed leukemia, although he was never told the true nature of his condition.

Bartók's countryman Fritz Reiner was one of his few champions, and with his support and under his baton, Bartók and Ditta played the premiere of the Concerto for Two Pianos, the orchestral version of the Sonata for Two Pianos and Percussion, on 31 January 1943 at Carnegie Hall with the New York Philharmonic. This was the last time Bartók performed in public.

He was still ill but appeared to be making a recovery after receiving a number of commissions: from Serge Koussevitzky for the Concerto for Orchestra (August–October 1943), from Yehudi Menuhin for the Sonata for Solo Violin (November 1943-March 1944), and from William Primrose for the Viola Concerto. He even put on considerable weight and complained of being about to burst. He also decided to write a third piano concerto as a surprise present for Ditta, who would be celebrating her 42nd birthday at the end of October 1945. But his recovery was illusory, and he died in New York on 26 September 1945. He managed to finish the scoring of the Piano Concerto No. 3 except for the final 17 bars, but he left coded instructions, which Tibor Serly was able to use to complete the work. The Viola Concerto was merely sketched out, and was in a far less final state, but it too was ultimately pieced together and orchestrated by Serly. Alternative completions and revisions of the work have since appeared by Bartok's son Peter and Paul Neubauer, Csaba Erdélyi, and Tabea Zimmermann.

The honour of premiering the Third Piano Concerto in February 1946 went to György Sándor, but Ditta Pásztory-Bartók did later perform and record it (with the Vienna Philharmonic conducted by Tibor Serly in 1964).

=== As a widow ===
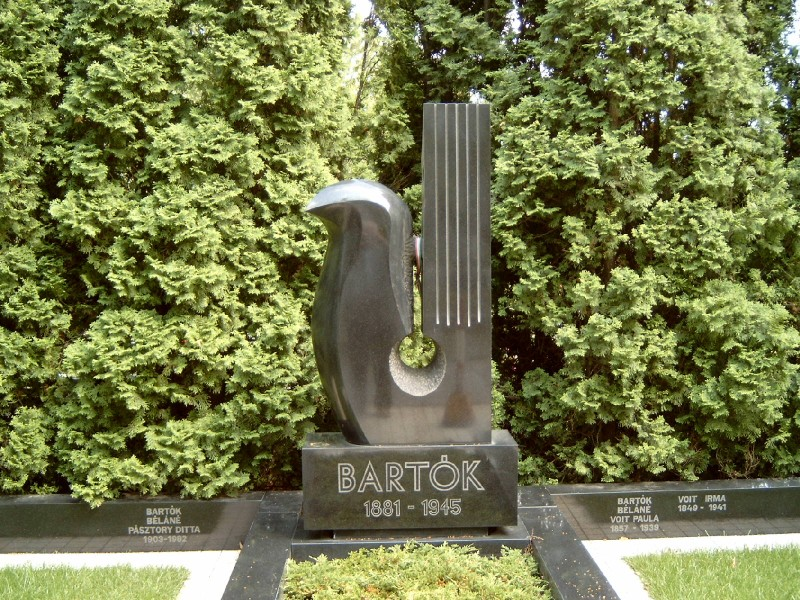
Grave stones of Bartók (center) and Ditta (left).

After Bartók's death, Ditta returned to Budapest in 1946, where she remained for the rest of her life, devoted to promoting the memory of her late husband. She gave concerts of his works, frequently with Erzsébet Tusa. She also recorded some excerpts from Mikrokosmos.

Ditta Pásztory-Bartók outlived Béla Bartók by 37 years, dying in Budapest in 1982, aged 79. Her husband's centenary had been celebrated the previous year. She is buried next to him in Budapest, after he was moved from the USA to Hungary.

The Béla Bartók-Ditta Pásztory Prize is named in their honour.
