= Out of Doors (Bartók) =

Five pieces for piano (1926) by Béla Bartók

- Piano music by Béla Bartók
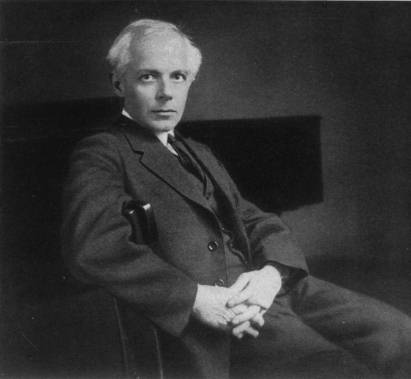
- The composer in 1927
- Native name: Szabadban
- Catalogue: Sz. 81; BB 89
- Composed: 1926
- Dedication: Ditta Pásztory-Bartók
- Movements: 5

Out of Doors is a set of five piano solo pieces, Sz. 81, BB 89, written by Béla Bartók in 1926. Out of Doors (Hungarian: Szabadban, German: Im Freien, French: En plein air) is among the very few instrumental compositions by Bartók with programmatic titles.

== Pieces ==
Out of Doors contains the following five pieces with approximate duration based on metronome markings:

Out of Doors
MIDI capture from piano performance (15:06)

1. "With Drums and Pipes" (Hungarian: "Síppal, dobbal") – Pesante. 1 min 45 s
2. "Barcarolla" – Andante. 2 min 17 s
3. "Musettes" – Moderato. 2 min 35 s
4. "The Night's Music" (Hungarian: "Az éjszaka zenéje") – Lento – (Un poco) più andante. 4 min 40 s
5. "The Chase" (Hungarian: "Hajsza") – Presto. 2 min – 2 min 12 s

== Period and circumstances of composition ==
After World War I (1914–1918), Bartók was largely prevented from continuing his folk music field research outside Hungary. This increased the development of his own personal style, marked by a sublimation of folk music into art music. Bartók composed Out of Doors in the 'piano year' of 1926, together with his Piano Sonata, his First Piano Concerto, and Nine Little Pieces. This particularly fruitful year followed a period of little compositional activity. The main trigger to start composing again was Bartók's attendance on 15 March 1926 of a performance of Stravinsky's Concerto for Piano and Wind Instruments (and Le Rossignol and Petrushka) in Budapest with the composer as pianist. This piece and Bartók's compositions of 1926 are marked by the treatment of the piano as a percussion instrument. Bartók wrote in early 1927:

It seems to me that the inherent nature [of the piano tone] becomes really expressive only by means of the present tendency to use the piano as a percussion instrument.

Another influence on the style of his piano compositions of 1926 was his study and editing of French and Italian (pre)-Baroque keyboard music in the early 1920s.

He wrote the work for his new wife, the pianist Ditta Pásztory-Bartók, whom he had married in 1923 shortly after divorcing his first wife, and who had given him his second son in 1924.

== Interrelation of the five pieces ==
Originally, Out of Doors was published in two volumes: one contained the first three pieces and the other the last two. Although the set is often referred to as a suite, Bartók did not usually play the set in its entirety. He premièred the first, fourth, and fifth pieces on the Hungarian radio on 8 December 1926, and played the fourth piece separately on numerous occasions. He referred to the set in a letter to his publisher as "five fairly difficult piano pieces", i.e., not as a suite. An arch form in the set has been proposed, with successive tonal centers of E-G-A-G-E, but different tonal centers have also been suggested, e.g., D-G-D-G-F. Nissman shows how individual pieces' motives and endings lead logically into the following piece within the set.

The compositional process sheds some light on the interrelation of the five pieces. Bartók's first sketches show pieces 1 and 2 as finally published. The third piece was added later, based on unused material for the third movement of the Piano Sonata. Notably, the two final pieces, 4 and 5, form one continuous piece, numbered "3" in the sketches. Bartók applied this juxtaposition of "The Night's Music" in a slow tempo with a presto section in a single piece/movement also in the second (middle) movement of his Second Piano Concerto.

== Discussion of individual pieces ==
=== "With Drums and Pipes" ===
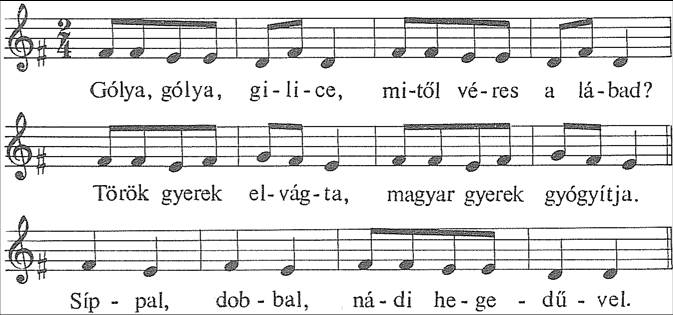
The folk song Gólya, gólya, gilice which contains the fragment Bartók used as the main motive of "With Drums and Pipes". The Hungarian title of the piece is "Síppal, dobbal", the first two words of the third system.

This is the only piece in the set which can be traced to a specific folk song, ""Gólya, gólya, gilice"" (see illustration). Bartók called his piece in Hungarian "Síppal, dobbal" ("With a whistle, with a drum"), which for Hungarians is up to this day an obvious quote from this folk song. The main motive of Bartók's piece is found in bars 9 and 10. This motive is taken from bars 5 and 6 of the folk song. The only change Bartók made was to accommodate the syncopation. The song text in literal translation:

Stork, stork, what made your leg bloody?
A Turkish child cut it, a Hungarian child cured it.
With a whistle, with a drum, and with a reed violin.

Károly Viski quotes this song in reference to the shamanistic origin of the text:

If we remember that the Hungarians, like many other people, were adherents of Shamanism in a certain period of their ancient history, these remnants can easily be understood. But the Shaman, the priest of the pagan Shamanism, is not only a fortune teller ..., he is also a doctor and magician, who drives away illnesses and cures them not with medicines, but with magic spells and songs. And if "he wants to hide" – that is in modern parlance – if he wants to fall into trance, besides other things, he prepares himself by dancing, singing and by performing to the accompaniment of drums ceremonial exercises ... Traces of this can be found even to this day in Hungarian folklore; of course ... in children's playful rhymes: [song quote] In the game which goes with this little rhyme, they beat each other with great noise and rapid gesticulation.

The quotation from the folk song that Bartók used contains only the trichord on the second degree of the tonal center in the song: E, F♯, and G. In Bartók's piece, this motive makes the tonal center (seem) E. Yet, just like the folk song, the piece comes home to the first degree: the tonal center D appears later in the piece at the end of the legato B section (measure 64) and the repeat of the A section.

Middle section:

The piece is in ternary form with a coda. The opening, closing, and coda sections consist of imitations of drums and lower wind instruments—"pipes". A less percussive, legato treatment of the piano is called for in the middle section in the middle and higher register, imitating gentler wind instruments. Bartók made a sketch of an orchestration for this piece in 1931, using for the opening section timpani and gran cassa (drums) and (contrabassoons and trombones (pipes).

=== "Musettes" ===
The title refers to the musette, a type of small bagpipe. Bartók's was inspired by Couperin, who wrote keyboard pieces imitating this instrument. The piece consists mostly of imitating the sound effects of a poorly tuned pair of musettes. There is little melody. "With Drums and Pipes" and "Tambourine" of Bartók's Nine Little Piano Pieces similarly consist of sound imitations of folk instruments.

A noteworthy instruction reads Due o tre volte ad libitum (play optionally two or three times), giving the performer a degree of freedom rare in classical music scores, and underlining the improvisatory and spontaneous nature of folk bagpipe music. The sostenuto pedal of the grand piano is necessary for a right rendering of the final four bars.

=== "The Night's Music" ===
This piece was immediately well received in Hungary, unlike many of Bartók's other compositions. Stevens already focuses attention to the quality and importance of this work in his early biography. It is "the locus classicus of a uniquely Bartókian contribution to the language of musical modernism".

The form is described variously in the literature, e.g., a loose rondo, A–B–A–C–A–B–A or as ternary, with the middle as 'developmental' section.

Three types of material are distinguished:

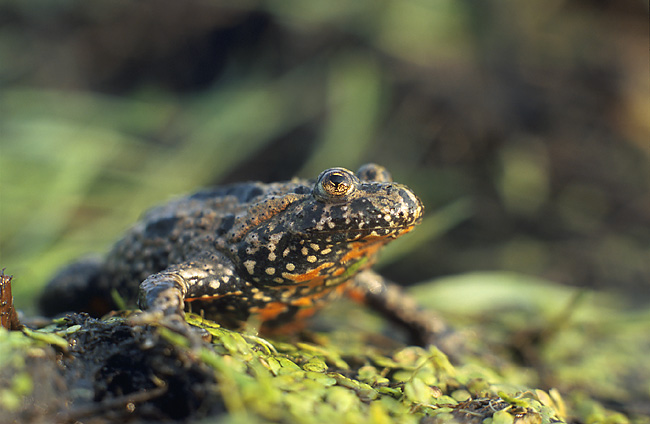
The Hungarian Unka frog Bombina bombina, whose call is imitated in "The Night's Music". After making a first noisy appearance in bar 6, he is featured throughout the piece, disregarding metre and tonality, ribbiting a last time in bar 70 before finally hopping off.

1. A Imitation of the sounds at night in a Hungarian summer, tonal centre G or ambiguous tonality. A highly dissonant arpeggiated cluster chord (E♯, F♯, G, G♯, A) is repeated throughout the section on the beat. On top of this, six imitations of natural sounds (birds, cicadas, and the particular Hungarian unka frog) are scored in a random fashion. This material is found in bars 1–17, 34–37, 48, and 67–71. There and small quotes in bars 25–26 and in 60, while the arpeggiated cluster chord is often inserted in the B and C material.
2. B Chorale in G. This material is found in bars 17–34 and 58–66.
3. C Peasant flute imitation strictly in the Dorian mode on C♯. Bartók frequently composed contrasting sections with a tonal centre which is a tritone apart C♯-G from a previous section. This material is found in bars 37–58, 61–67, and 70–71.

Notable overlap occurs in bars 61–66, where the chorale (B) and peasant flute (C) materials sound together. This is far from a traditional duet, because the characters, tempos and tonal centers of the two parts vary widely, as often in Bartók's night music.

The random scoring of nature's sounds in the A-material makes memorisation extremely difficult. But memorisation turns out to be not necessary as witnessed by the anecdote of Mária Comensoli, a piano student of Bartók. She was astonished when she first played "The Night's Music" by heart (as required at Bartók's lessons) and Bartók remarked

Are you playing exactly the same number of ornaments that imitate the noises of the night and at exactly the same place where I indicated them? This does not have to be taken so seriously, you can place them anywhere and play of them as many as you like.

The many precise dynamic and stress signs witness how Bartók aimed for very specific performance and sound effects. Three footnotes in the score deal with the exact execution of arpeggios and grace note figurations. The fourth footnote instructs the pianist to play the cluster chord E, F, F♯, G, G♯, A, B♭, C♭ with the palm of the hand.

=== "The Chase" ===
This piece consists of five melodic episodes. They are prefaced and separated (except for the fourth and fifth episode) by 'ritornello' type sections of repeated cluster chords in a clashing rhythm (duplets in 6/8 measure).

The piece is related to the pantomime The Miraculous Mandarin, in character to the chase scene and harmonically to the important two building blocks which are presented directly at the start of the pantomime:

1. A three-note chord consisting of the ground note, and a tritone and a major seventh above, e.g. F, B, E.
2. A scale spanning an augmented octave

The left hand plays an ostinato arpeggiated quintuplet chord of F, G♯, B, C♯, E, of which the E is on the beat (6/8 measure). This figure consists of the 'pantomime' chord of F, B, E, to which the fourth of G♯, C♯, is added. This ostinato changes at every new episode:

1. In the second episode, the C♯ is moved an octave down, making the whole figure span a minor tenth (C♯, F, G♯, B, E).
2. In the third episode, the B is moved an octave down B, F, G♯, C♯, E, calling in Bartók's own fingering for a change of hand position in the execution of this figure (1, 5, 4, 2, 1).
3. In the fourth episode, the figure is expanded to B, D, G, A♯, F, G♯, C♯, E (in two quadruplets per two beats). This figure can be interpreted in different ways. Firstly, as two 'pantomime' chords, (F, B, E and B, F, A♯; or F, B, E and D, G♯, C♯) to which four or two notes are added (D, G, G♯, C♯; and G, A♯ respectively). The chords are remarkably symmetrically distributed over the figure. Secondly, two 'pantomime' chords (F, B, E and G♯, D, G) with two added notes (A♯, C♯). Thirdly, the figure consists of two four-note figures, exactly a tritone apart. Lastly, the pitch inventory consists of two diminished seventh chords, on B and G, symmetrically divided over the figure.
4. Within the fourth episode, the figure is limited to A♯, B, D, G for a few measures. This seems mostly a necessity for pianistic reasons, but the resulting figure is quite similar to the one bridging the fourth and fifth episodes
5. Bridging the fourth and fifth episodes, for only one measure the figure changes to B, D, F, G, A♯. This figure is the first half of a cadence which resolves in the recapitulation of the first theme.
6. In the fifth episode, the figure is the same as in the first episode, except that it is stretched to ten notes over two octaves in two beats, F, G♯, B, C♯, E, F, G♯, B, C♯, E.

The melody features the augmented octave scale.

This piece is technically difficult: "From the standpoint of technique and endurance, especially for the left hand, this [piece] could easily be the most demanding in Bartók's entire output.

== Editions of score and recordings ==
=== Score ===
The Boosey & Hawkes printing is a facsimile of the original edition from Universal Edition. There is a new edition from Boosey & Hawkes by Peter Bartók and Nelson Dellamaggiore.

=== Notable recordings ===
- Bartók had planned to record the fourth piece himself, writing it would last approximately four and a half minutes. No recording is now known to exist.
- György Sándor: Béla Bartók: Piano Music. LP recording, 9 discs in 3 volumes: 33⅓ rpm, stereo. Vox Box SVBX 5425–SVBX 5427. New York: Vox Records, 1961–63. Sándor was a pupil of Bartók.
- Zoltán Kocsis: Béla Bartók: Works for Piano. Sonata for Piano, BB 88; Out of Doors, BB 89; Two Romanian Dances, BB 56; Three Hungarian Folk Songs from Csík, BB 45b; Romanian Christmas carols, BB 67; Fourteen Bagatelles, BB 50; Sonatina, BB 69. Recorded Hamburg, Friedrich-Ebert-Halle, 1991, 1993, and 1996. CD recording. 1 disc, stereo. Philips 464 676-2 PM. [Germany]: Philips Classics, 2001. Kocsis recorded all Bartók solo piano music, attempting to stay close to Bartók's score and Bartók's own performance. Tempos are strictly followed from the score, including the extraordinary 160 dotted quarters per minute in The Chase.
- Murray Perahia: Murray Perahia Plays Bartók. Sonata; Improvisations on Hungarian Peasant Songs, Op. 20; Suite, Op. 14; Out of Doors. LP recording, 1 disc: 33⅓ rpm, stereo. CBS Masterworks M 36704. New York: CBS Masterworks, 1981.
- Barbara Nissman: Out of Doors. Bartók's Out of Doors, plus music by Schubert, Chopin, Rachmaninoff, Hummel, Mendelssohn and Prokofiev. CD recording, 1 disc: stereo.

== Sources ==
- Bayley, Amanda, ed. (2001). The Cambridge Companion to Bartók. Cambridge Companions to Music. Cambridge and New York: Cambridge University Press. ISBN 978-0-521-66958-0.
- Bartók, Béla (1976). "About the 'Piano' Problem (1927)". In Benjamin Suchoff (ed.). Béla Bartók Essays. London: Faber & Faber. ISBN 0-571-10120-8. OCLC 60900461.
- Bónis, Ferenc [in Hungarian] (1995). Így láttuk Bartókot: ötvennégy emlékezés [This Is How We Saw Bartók: Fifty-four Memories]. Budapest: Püski. ISBN 978-963-8256-53-9.
- Danchenka, Gary (Spring 1987). "Diatonic Pitch-Class Sets in Bartók's Night Music". Indiana Theory Review. 8 (1): 15–55.
- Gillies, Malcolm (September 2006). "Bartók's 'Fallow Years': A Reappraisal". Studia Musicologica Academiae Scientiarum Hungaricae. 47 (3–4). Budapest: Akadémiai Kiadó. doi:10.1556/SMus.47.2006.3-4.7. ISSN 0039-3266.
- Nissman, Barbara. (2002). Bartók and the Piano: A Performer's View. Lanham, Maryland: Scarecrow Press. ISBN 0-8108-4301-3
- Schneider, David E. (1995). "Bartók and Stravinsky: Respect, Competition, Influence and the Hungarian Reaction to Modernism in the 1920s". In Peter Laki (ed.). Bartók and His World. Princeton: Princeton University Press. pp. 172–202. ISBN 978-0-691-00633-8.
- Schneider, David E. (2006). Bartók, Hungary, and the Renewal of Tradition: Case Studies in the Intersection of Modernity and Nationality. California Studies in 20th-Century Music, vol. 5. Berkeley: University of California Press. ISBN 978-0-520-24503-7.
- Somfai, Laszlo (1993). "The 'Piano Year' of 1926". In The Bartók Companion, Malcolm Gillies (ed.), 173–188. London: Faber. ISBN 0-571-15330-5, 0-571-15331-3 (cloth, pbk). American printing, Portland, Oregon: Amadeus Press, 1994. ISBN 0-931340-74-8, 0-931340-75-6 (cloth, pbk)
- Somfai, Laszlo (1996). Béla Bartók: Composition, Concepts, and Autograph Sources. Ernest Bloch Lectures in Music 9. Berkeley: University of California Press. ISBN 978-0-520-08485-8
- Stevens, Halsey. (1953). The Life and Music of Béla Bartók. New York: Oxford University Press. Revised edition. New York: Oxford University Press, 1964. 3rd ed., prepared by Malcolm Gillies. Oxford: Clarendon Press; New York: Oxford University Press, 1993 ISBN 978-0-19-816349-7
- Viski, Károly [in Hungarian] (1932). Hungarian Peasant Customs. Budapest: George Vajna & Co. ASIN B002LY2XQM. (no ISBN)
- Yeomans, David (1988). Bartók for Piano: A Survey of His Solo Literature. Bloomington: Indiana University Press. ISBN 0-253-31006-7 Paperback reissue, Bloomington: Indiana University Press, 2000. ISBN 0-253-21383-5
