= Sonata for Two Pianos and Percussion =

1937 musical piece written by Béla Bartók

- by Béla Bartók
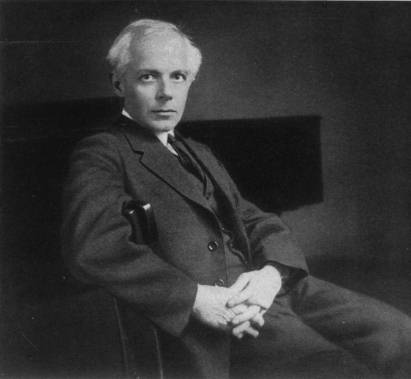
- Bartók in 1927
- Catalogue: Sz. 110; BB 115
- Composed: 1937
- Performed: 16 January 1938: Basel
- Movements: three

The Sonata for Two Pianos and Percussion, Sz. 110, BB 115, is a musical piece written by Hungarian composer Béla Bartók in 1937. The sonata was premiered by Bartók and his second wife, Ditta Pásztory-Bartók, with the percussionists Fritz Schiesser and Philipp Rühlig at the International Society for Contemporary Music (ISCM) anniversary concert of 16 January 1938 in Basel, Switzerland, where it received enthusiastic reviews. Bartók and his wife also played the piano parts for the American premiere which took place in New York City's Town Hall in 1940 with the percussionists Saul Goodman and Henry Deneke. It has since become one of Bartók's most performed works.

== Instrumentation ==
The score requires four performers, two pianists and two percussionists, who play seven instruments between them: timpani, bass drum (gran cassa), cymbals, triangle, snare drum (both on- and off- snares), tam-tam (gong) and xylophone. In the published score, the composer provides detailed instructions for the percussionists, stipulating, for example, which part of a suspended cymbal is to be struck with what type of stick. He also provides precise instructions for the platform layout of the four players and their instruments.

== Music ==
The work consists of three movements:

=== I. Assai lento – Allegro molto ===
First movement (excerpt)
This segment of the sonata features pedal glissandos during a timpani roll.

The first movement is in a modified version of traditional sonata form. There are clearly delineated sections—introduction, exposition, development, recapitulation and coda—but Bartók eschews the customary relationships between keys, beginning the movement in F♯ and ending in C major, with excursions into several unexpected keys in between. This structural tritone relationship is not unusual for Bartók; it may be found in many of his other compositions, including the first movement of his well-known work, Music for Strings, Percussion and Celesta. The rhythm of this movement is varied within an overall 9/8 time. The movement is also untypical of classical sonata form in that it constitutes half the playing time of the whole work.

=== II. Lento, ma non troppo ===
This movement displays the classical "middle movement" ternary A–B–A form. It is an example of Bartók's "night music" idiom.

=== III. Allegro non troppo ===
The third movement is a rondo-like dance, starting and finishing in C major. The pianos introduce the movement, followed by the xylophone. At the end of the work, the last notes of the pianos die away, there is a concluding duet for snare drum and cymbal, and the sonata ends extremely quietly.

== Concerto version ==
In 1940, at the suggestion of his publisher and agent, Hans Heinsheimer, Bartók orchestrated the sonata as Concerto for Two Pianos, Percussion and Orchestra. The parts for the four soloists were essentially unchanged. The world premiere was given at the Royal Albert Hall, London, at a Royal Philharmonic Society concert on 14 November 1942, with percussionists Ernest Gillegin and Frederick Bradshaw, the then-husband-and-wife piano team of Louis Kentner and Ilona Kabos, and the London Philharmonic Orchestra, conducted by Sir Adrian Boult. The composer and Ditta Pásztory-Bartók were piano soloists in a performance at Carnegie Hall in New York on January 21, 1943, with the New York Philharmonic conducted by Fritz Reiner. This was Bartók's final public appearance as a performer. He died of leukemia in 1945.

== Ballet ==
Kenneth MacMillan used this sonata for his 1975 ballet Rituals for The Royal Ballet, London.
