= Multiplication (music) =

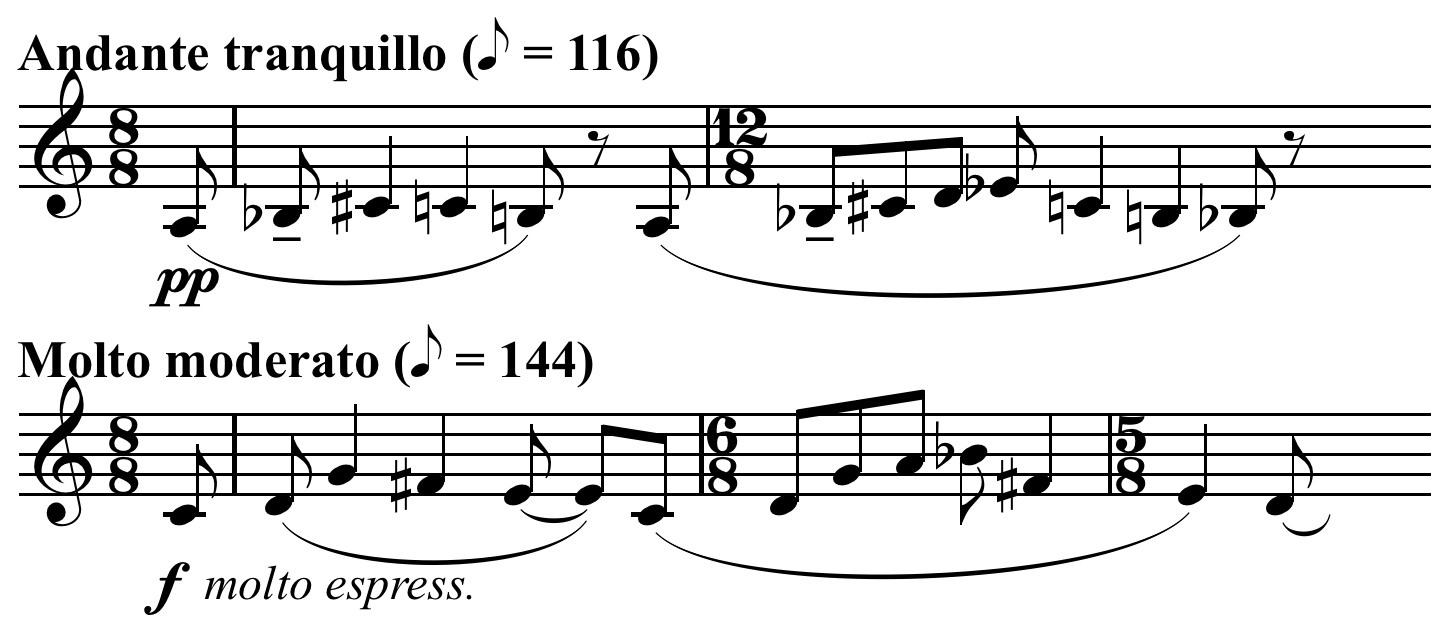
Interval expansion in Bartók's Music for Strings, Percussion and Celesta: first movement (mm. 1–5) and fourth movement (mm. 204–209).

Multiplication is a mathematical practice that can be applied to music. The operation multiplies the numeric value of musical parameters like notes or rhythms to create new ones. Like transposition, inversion, and retrogression, multiplication generates new material from melodic sources. The practice is particularly important in the field of twelve-tone technique and set theory.

== Background ==
Ernst Krenek was the first to describe the technique during a series of lectures in 1936. The antecedents of pitch multiplication can be found in the music of both Béla Bartók and Alban Berg. Bartók described the process as an "extension in range", where chromatic intervals are augmented into diatonic ones. The process can be seen in the outer movements of his Music for Strings, Percussion and Celesta. In Bartók's String Quartet No. 3, the opening chromatic tetrachord eventually expands from a series of semitones (C♯–D–D♯–E) into a series of fifths (C♯–G♯–D♯–A♯).

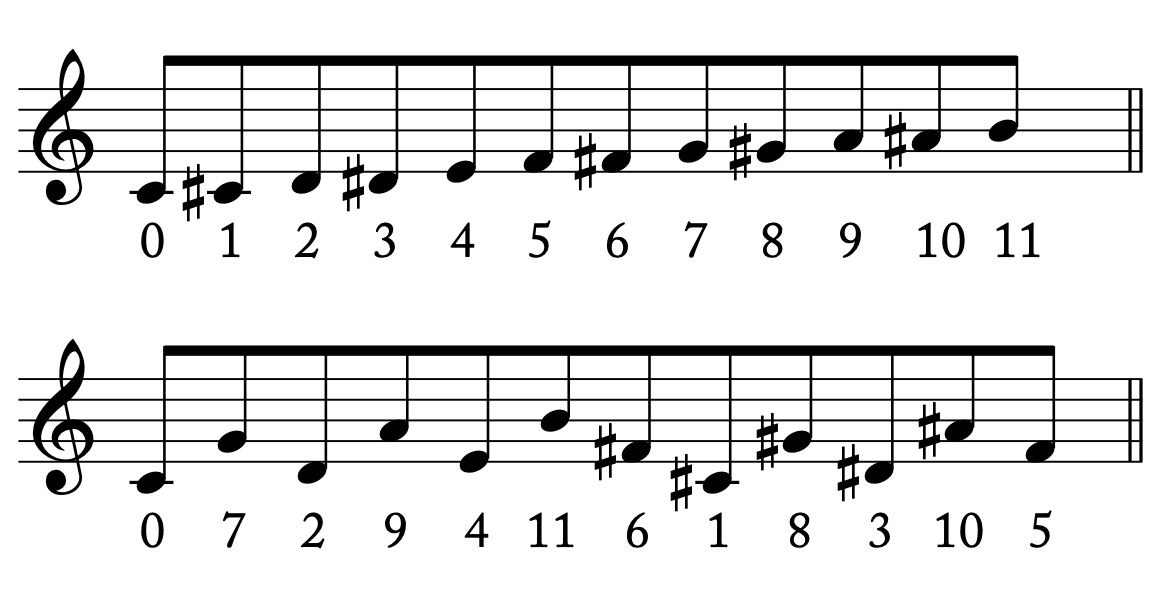
When multiplied by seven (mod 12), the pitches of a chromatic scale yield a cycle of fifths.

As twelve-tone technique developed, composers and music theorists sometimes reduced pitches to classes where every occurrence of a note can be considered the same, regardless of its octave. Those classes are often assigned numbers to assist in analysis, especially of tone rows. In addition to transformations like transposition, inversion, regression, and retrograde inversion, a composer could apply multiplication to their tone rows as a developmental technique. The process is transposition by multiplication instead of addition. Where transposition by a perfect fifth adds the interval to each note value, in multiplication, each note value is multiplied by a fifth.

Since octaves are disregarded in pitch classes, modular arithmetic is applied. For any given collection of twelve tones, only three multipliers would yield a new set of twelve unique tones: 5, 7, and 11. When the chromatic scale is multiplied by 7 (mod 12), the result is a cycle of fifths. This is the same transformation found in Bartók's string quartet. Music theorists denote multiplication by the letter 'M' and the factor number: M_{5}, M_{7}, M_{11}. M_{5} and M_{7} are inversions of each other. M_{11} inverts the tone row.

== Usage ==
Herbert Eimert used the terms "Quartverwandlung" (fourth transformation) and "Quintverwandlung" (fifth transformation) for the operations later theorists would call M_{5} and M_{7}. He described the process as akin to the vertical mirror operation of inversion and the horizontal mirroring of retrogression. Fourth and fifth transformations slant the mirror to the angle of their respective intervals. These two operations appear in works by Milton Babbitt, Robert Morris, and Charles Wuorinen's The Politics of Harmony. M_{5} also occurs in jazz. Theorists like James K. Randall, Godfrey Winham, and Hubert S. Howe also used the concept of multiplication to analyze music that was not twelve-tone.

Pierre Boulez advanced the concept beyond simple multiplication by a single factor. He would often multiply one group of notes by another, creating a much more intricate complex of resulting pitches. As with all serial music, he utilized multiplication on additional parameters like rhythm and timbre. Boulez' 1955 masterpiece Le Marteau sans maître demonstrates the technique, which is also found in his Third Piano Sonata, Structures II, Pli selon pli, and several other works.

In addition to Bartók, many other composers employed the concepts of multiplication while using different names for the technique. Howard Hanson called it "projection". Nicolas Slonimsky liked the names interpolation, infrapolation, and ultrapolation. Adriaan Fokker devised a tuning system where chords could be constructed through multiplication.

Joseph Schillinger used the opening rhythm of "Pennies from Heaven" to demonstrate how squaring the durations generates new material. He also expanded multiplication into geometric space, citing the precedent in visual art. Schillinger had a parlor trick of multiplying by two all of the intervals in a Johann Sebastian Bach fugue and performing the results.
