= Concerto for Orchestra (Bartók) =

Orchestral work by Béla Bartók

- by Béla Bartók
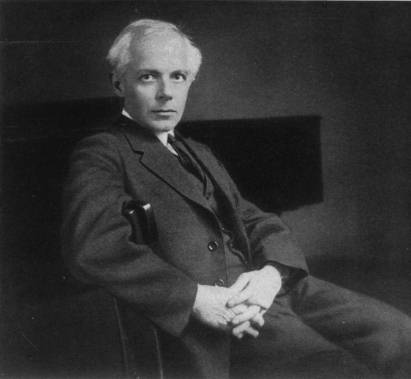
- The composer in 1927
- Catalogue: Sz. 116, BB 123
- Composed: 1943 rev. 1945
- Duration: About 38 minutes
- Movements: Five
- Scoring: Orchestra

Premiere
- Date: 1 December 1944
- Location: Symphony Hall, Boston
- Conductor: Serge Koussevitzky
- Performers: Boston Symphony Orchestra

The Concerto for Orchestra, Sz. 116, BB 123, is a five-movement orchestral work composed by Béla Bartók in 1943. It is one of his best-known, most popular, and most accessible works.

The score is inscribed "15 August – 8 October 1943". It was premiered on December 1, 1944, at Symphony Hall, Boston, by the Boston Symphony Orchestra conducted by Serge Koussevitzky. It was a great success and has been regularly performed since. Bartók revised the piece in February 1945.

Bartók's is perhaps the best-known of a number of pieces with the apparently contradictory title "Concerto for Orchestra". This is in contrast to the conventional concerto form, which features a solo instrument with orchestral accompaniment. Bartók said he called the piece a concerto rather than a symphony because of the way each section of instruments is treated in a soloistic and virtuosic way.

== Composition ==
The work was written in response to a commission from the Koussevitzky Foundation, run by the conductor Serge Koussevitzky, after Bartók moved to the United States, having fled his native Hungary because of World War II. In 1943, while Bartók was in hospital suffering from what would later be discovered to be leukemia, he was visited by Koussevitzky, who informed him of the commission. It has been speculated that Bartók's previous work, the String Quartet No. 6 (1939), which was completed just before he left Hungary, could have been his last were it not for this commission. Bartók then wrote several other works afterwards, including his Sonata for Solo Violin and Piano Concerto No. 3.

== Instrumentation ==
The piece is scored for the following instrumentation.

Woodwinds
3 flutes (one doubling piccolo)
3 oboes (one doubling cor anglais)
3 clarinets (one doubling bass clarinet)
3 bassoons (one doubling contrabassoon)

Brass
4 horns
3 trumpets
3 trombones
1 tuba

Percussion
timpani
side drum
bass drum
cymbals
triangle
tam-tam

Strings
2 harps

violins I, II
violas
cellos
double basses

== Musical analysis ==
The piece is in five movements:

1. Introduzione. Andante non troppo – Allegro vivace
2. Presentando le coppie. Allegro scherzando
3. Elegia. Andante non troppo
4. Intermezzo interrotto. Allegretto
5. Finale. Presto

Bartók makes extensive use of classical elements in the work; for instance, the first and fifth movements are in sonata-allegro form.

The work combines elements of Western art music and eastern European folk music, especially that of Hungary, and departs from standard tonality, often using non-traditional modes and artificial scales. Bartók extensively researched Eastern European and Balkan folk melodies, and their influence is felt throughout the work. For example, the second main theme of the first movement, as played by the first oboe, resembles a folk melody, with its narrow range and almost haphazard rhythm. The drone in the horns and strings also indicates folk influence.

The second theme of the first movement (measure 155). The harp is not shown.

=== I. Introduzione ===
The first movement, Introduzione, consists of a slow introduction, presenting the main material (consecutive intervals of fourths, scale fragments, mirror ideas, etc.) leading to an allegro with numerous fugato passages. The quick part is in sonata-allegro form.

=== II. Presentando le coppie ===
The second movement is called "Game of Pairs". Its main part has five sections, each thematically distinct from the others, with a different pair of instruments playing together in each. In each passage, a different interval separates the pair—bassoons are a minor sixth apart, oboes are in minor thirds, clarinets in minor sevenths, flutes in fifths, and muted trumpets in major seconds. The movement prominently features a side drum that taps out a rhythm at the beginning and end of this part. In between this section and a variation is a short brass chorale that to some listeners (including some who wrote cover notes for recordings of this work) suggests a kind of marriage ceremony.

The published score titles the movement "Giuoco delle coppie" or "Game of the couples", but Bartók's manuscript had no title for this movement at the time the engraving-copy blueprint was made. At some later date, Bartók added the words "Presentando le coppie" or "Presentation of the couples" to the manuscript and the addition of this title was included in the list of corrections to be made to the score. In Bartók's file blueprint the final title is found, and because it is believed to have been the composer's later thought, it is retained in the revised edition of the score.

The original 1946 printed score also had an incorrect metronome marking for this movement. This was brought to light by Georg Solti as he was preparing to record the piece with the Chicago Symphony Orchestra in 1980:

When preparing ... for the recording I was determined that the tempi should be exactly as Bartók wrote and this led me to some extraordinary discoveries, chief of which was in the second movement.... The printed score gives crotchet equals 74, which is extremely slow, but I thought that I must follow what it says. When we rehearsed I could see that the musicians didn't like it at all and in the break the side drum player (who starts the movement with a solo) came to me and said "Maestro, my part is marked crotchet equals 94", which I thought must be a mistake, since none of the other parts have a tempo marking. The only way to check was to locate the manuscript and through the courtesy of the Library of Congress in Washington we obtained a copy of the relevant page, which not only clearly showed crotchet equals 94, but a tempo marking of "Allegro scherzando" (the printed score gives "Allegretto scherzando"). Furthermore Bartók headed it "Presentando le coppie" (Presentation of the couples), not "Giuoco delle coppie" (Game of the couples). I was most excited by this, because it becomes a quite different piece. The programme of the first performance in Boston clearly has the movement marked "Allegro scherzando" and the keeper of the Bartók archives was able to give us further conclusive evidence that the faster tempo must be correct. I have no doubt that thousands of performances, including my own up to now, have been given at the wrong speed!

Despite Solti's assertion that thousands of earlier performances had been played at the wrong speed, both of Fritz Reiner's recordings—his 1946 recording with the Pittsburgh Symphony Orchestra (the first recording of the work) and his 1955 recording with the Chicago Symphony Orchestra—use the faster tempo Solti later recommended. Reiner had known Bartók since 1905, when they were fellow students at the Budapest Academy; it was Reiner, along with Joseph Szigeti, who persuaded Serge Koussevitsky to commission the Concerto.

=== III. Elegia ===
The third movement, "Elegia", is another slow movement, typical of Bartók's so-called "night music". It revolves around three themes derived primarily from the first movement.

=== IV. Intermezzo interrotto ===
The fourth movement, "Intermezzo interrotto" (literally "interrupted intermezzo"), consists of a flowing melody with changing time signatures, intermixed with a theme that quotes the song "Da geh' ich zu Maxim" from Franz Lehár's operetta The Merry Widow, which had recently also been referenced in the "invasion" theme of Dmitri Shostakovich's Symphony No. 7 "Leningrad". Whether Bartók was parodying Lehár, Shostakovich, or both has been hotly disputed, without conclusive evidence either way. The theme is itself interrupted by glissandi on the trombones and woodwinds.

Timpani excerpt
Excerpt from the fourth movement. The timpanist plays a chromatic bass line, requiring using the pedal to change pitches.

In this movement, the timpani are featured when the second theme is introduced, requiring 10 different pitches of the timpani over the course of 20 seconds. The general structure is "ABA–interruption–BA."

=== V. Finale ===
The fifth movement, marked presto, consists of a whirling perpetuum mobile main theme competing with fugato fireworks and folk melodies. It is in sonata-allegro form.

== Recordings ==
The following are only a small selection of the numerous available recordings.

- Recorded on 4–5 February 1946, with Fritz Reiner conducting the Pittsburgh Symphony Orchestra. Columbia Masterworks M-793 (78 rpm). Columbia Records later released a 12-inch LP recording. Columbia ML 4102 (monaural). New York: Columbia.
- In 1953, Columbia (UK) released a recording with Herbert von Karajan conducting the Philharmonia Orchestra. 12-inch LP recording. Columbia 33CX 1054 (monaural). London: Columbia Records.
- In 1954, Columbia Records released a recording with Eugene Ormandy conducting the Philadelphia Orchestra. 12-inch LP recording. Columbia ML 4973 (monaural). New York: Columbia.
- In 1958, RCA Victor issued a recording with Fritz Reiner conducting the Chicago Symphony Orchestra. 12-inch LP recording. RCA Victor LSC-1934
- In 1956, Decca Records released a recording with Ernest Ansermet conducting the Orchestre de la Suisse Romande, also including Frank Martin's Concerto for seven winds, percussion, and string orchestra. Decca LXT 5305; London CS-6086; Decca Eclipse (stereo). London: Decca.
- In 1959, EMI Records released a recording with Rafael Kubelik conducting the Royal Philharmonic Orchestra, also including Bartók's Two Portraits, Op. 5. 12-inch LP recording. HMV ASD 312 (stereo). UK: His Master's Voice.
- In 1960, Columbia Records released a recording with Leonard Bernstein conducting the New York Philharmonic Orchestra, recorded at St. George Hotel, Brooklyn, New York, November 30, 1959. 12-inch LP recording. Columbia MS 6140 (stereo). New York: Columbia Records.
- In 1962, RCA Victor released a recording with Erich Leinsdorf conducting the Boston Symphony Orchestra, made in Symphony Hall, Boston. 12-inch LP recording. RCA Victor LSC-2643. New York: RCA Victor.
- 1963, Czech Philharmonic Orchestra, Karel Ančerl. Dvorak Hall, Prague. Supraphon.
- In 1965, Columbia released a recording with George Szell conducting the Cleveland Orchestra, also including Leoš Janáček's Sinfonietta. 12-inch LP recording. Columbia ML 6215 (stereo). New York: Columbia. (Szell made what critic David Hurwitz has termed a "whopping" cut to the fifth movement that "necessitates a bit of recomposition to make the join work.")
- In 1965, Decca Records released a recording with Georg Solti conducting the London Symphony Orchestra. 12-inch LP recording. Decca SXL 6212 (stereo).
- In 1979, RCA Red Seal released the first digital recording of the work with Eugene Ormandy conducting the Philadelphia Orchestra. RCA Red Seal ARC1-3421
- Recorded in Orchestra Hall, Chicago in January 1981, Sir Georg Solti conducting the Chicago Symphony Orchestra. Digital recording, coupled with Mussorgsky, Pictures at an Exhibition, orchestrated by Ravel, Decca 417 754–2.
- 2005: Iván Fischer (conductor) Budapest Festival Orchestra, Philips 476 7255
- In 2012, Naxos Records released a recording with Marin Alsop conducting the Baltimore Symphony Orchestra in addition to Bartók's Music for Strings, Percussion and Celesta. Digital recording. Naxos 8.572486.

== Piano reduction ==
In 1985, Bartók's son Peter Bartók discovered a manuscript of a piano reduction of the score in the large body of material left to him upon his father's death. This version had been prepared for rehearsals of a ballet interpretation of the Concerto, to be performed by the Ballet Theatre in New York. This performance never took place, and the piano score was shelved. Soon after the discovery of this manuscript, Peter Bartók asked the Hungarian pianist György Sándor to prepare the manuscript for publication and performance. The world premiere recording of this edited reduction was made by Sándor in 1987, on CBS Masterworks: the CD also includes piano versions of the Dance Suite, Sz. 77 and Petite Suite, Sz. 105, which was adapted from some of the 44 Violin Duos.
