= Piano Concerto No. 3 (Bartók) =

1945 musical work by Béla Bartók

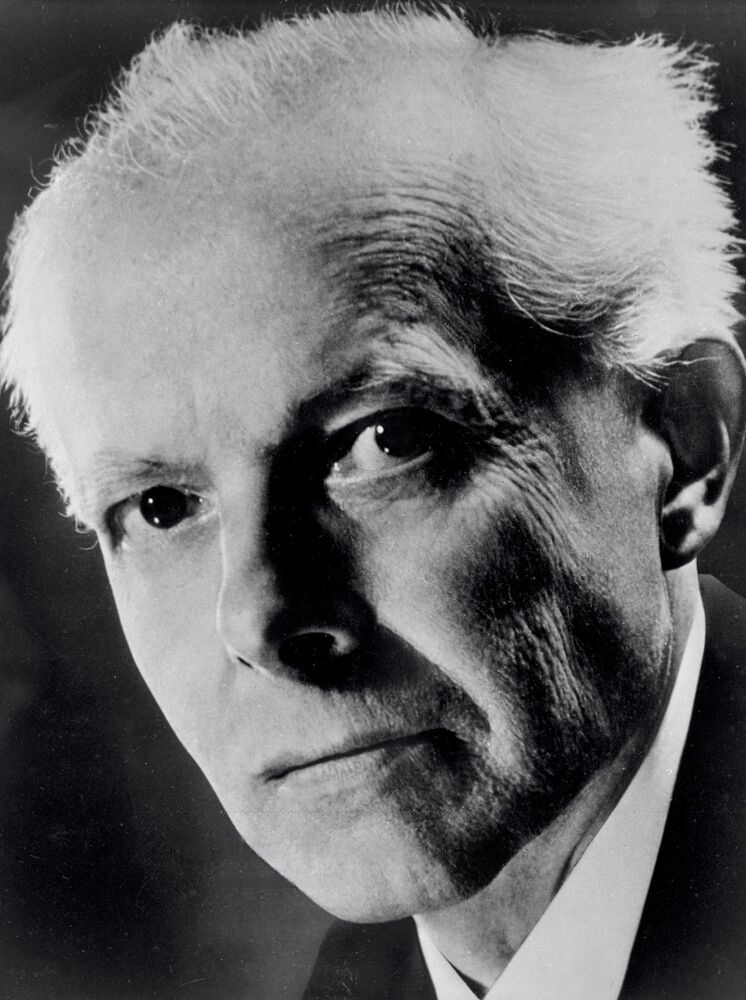
Bartók in 1943

The Piano Concerto No. 3 in E major, Sz. 119, BB 127 of Béla Bartók is a musical composition for piano and orchestra. The work was composed in 1945 during the final months of his life, as a surprise birthday present for his second wife Ditta Pásztory-Bartók.

It consists of three movements and an average full performance time is between 23 and 27 minutes.

== Context ==
The Piano Concerto No. 3 was one of the pieces composed by Bartók after departing Hungary following the outbreak of World War II. Bartók's migration from Europe to America preceded that of his music. Lack of local interest, combined with Bartók's extended battle with leukemia and a general sense of discomfort in the American atmosphere prevented Bartók from composing a great deal in his early years in America. Fortunately, the composer was commissioned to create his Concerto for Orchestra which was extremely well received and decreased the composer's financial difficulties.

This, combined with an abatement of his medical condition, allowed for a change in the composer's general disposition. The changes in the composer's emotional and financial state are considered by a few to be the primary causes for the third piano concerto's seemingly light, airy, almost neoclassical tone, especially in comparison to Bartók's earlier works.

However, while the composition of a piece as a gift (his wife Ditta Pásztory-Bartók's upcoming 42nd birthday on October 31, 1945 - Bartók intended the solo part for her to perform, providing her with a source of income after his death) as opposed to a commission undoubtedly impacted the composing process, some think it more likely that the piece was instead the culmination of a trend of reduction and simplification which began almost ten years prior, with the Second Violin Concerto, and which concluded Bartók's exploration of tonality and complexity.

Bartók died on September 26, 1945, with the concerto complete except for the orchestration of the final 17 bars of music. The task of completing their orchestration, drawing on Bartók's notes, was eventually done by the composer's friend, Tibor Serly. The Third Piano Concerto was later published in an edition by Serly and Erwin Stein, an editor for Boosey & Hawkes.

It was premiered in Philadelphia on February 8, 1946, under Hungarian conductor Eugene Ormandy with György Sándor as piano soloist.

Beginning in the 1990s, the composer's son, Peter Bartók, in association with Argentinian musician Nelson Dellamaggiore, worked to re-print and revise past editions of the Third Piano Concerto, to eradicate the multiple printed errors identified but never corrected by his father. Although few in actual number, changes made to the Piano Concerto affected the notes, pedalling and tempos of several key passages. In 1994 Andrey Kasparov was soloist with the Columbus Indiana Philharmonic (formerly Columbus Pro Musica) in the world premiere of the revised edition. According to conductor David Bowden, and Peter Bartók, who was in attendance: “These changes generally make the piano part more accessible or clarify questions of chordal structure....”

The revised editions of both the two-piano reduction and the orchestral score of the Piano Concerto No. 3 are now available from Boosey & Hawkes.

== Music ==
Piano Concerto No. 3 consists of three movements:

1. Allegretto
2. Adagio religioso
3. Allegro vivace

The piece was originally scored for 2 flutes (2nd doubling piccolo), 2 oboes (2nd doubling cor anglais), 2 clarinets in A and B♭ (2nd doubling bass clarinet), 2 bassoons, 4 horns in F, 2 trumpets in C, 3 trombones, tuba, timpani, percussion, strings, and piano.

=== I. Allegretto ===
The first movement, based basically in E major, features an original Hungarian "folk theme," similar to a nineteenth-century Hungarian verbunkos dance. The theme is first introduced by the piano.

The first chord of the first movement, which consists of four pitches, E, F♯, A, and B, is relatively tonal, especially when compared to the first chord of Piano Concerto No. 1. The chord develops further with the addition of C♯ in the second bar, resulting in the pentatonic, which is followed with G♯, leaving a major scale short of D♯. Bartók continues to add D to complete the Mixolydian scale, followed by G natural to suggest the Dorian mode. Finally, in bar six, Bartók displays the Lydian mode through G♯ and A♯. This complex melodic pattern is an example of what Bartók called "polymodal chromaticism," the rapid succession of multiple modes through chromatic alteration to produce a chromatic texture.

=== II. Adagio religioso ===
The second movement, based in C major, seems to mirror the style of a Beethoven chorale. The string introduction followed by the chorale on piano is a clear allusion to the third movement of Beethoven's String Quartet in A minor.

Bartók includes a harmony related to the Tristan chord, a set of intervals from Richard Wagner's Tristan und Isolde referred to as the "characteristically sad and yearning harmony of Romanticism." The final resolution of the Tristan chord comes as a C-based pentatonic mode, and as Bartók was known to consider pentatonicism a chief characteristic of ancient Hungarian folksong, this can be considered a musical symbol of his Hungarian homeland. The middle section is in Bartók's Night music style. It contains imitations of natural sounds of insect and bird calls.

=== III. Allegro vivace ===
The third and final movement demonstrates a joie de vivre and apparent optimism often found in Bartók's final movements, though with considerably stronger folk inspiration with its apparent Hungarian folk melody and its rondo-like returning theme. It has been said that this movement "captures the infectious ebullient spirit of the folk song." There is also a central fugato section in almost Baroque style.

== Recordings ==
- Radio-Symphonie-Orchester Berlin under conductor Ferenc Fricsay, Soloist: Géza Anda, 1959/1960 recorded in the Jesus Christ Church in Berlin.
- New Philharmonia Orchestra under conductor Sir Malcolm Sargent, Soloist: John Ogdon, recorded prior to 1968 in Europe, Angel/EMI.
- Budapest Symphony Orchestra under conductor András Ligeti, Soloist: Jenő Jandó, Naxos, 1994
- Budapest Festival Orchestra under conductor Iván Fischer, Soloist: András Schiff, in April 1996 recorded in Budapest in the Italian Cultural Institute. Sound engineer was Eberhard Sengpiel.
- London Symphony Orchestra under conductor Pierre Boulez, Soloist: Hélène Grimaud, 2004.
- Frank Zappa recorded part of the concerto in 1988 on his last tour, and it is included in his album, Make a Jazz Noise Here, alongside an extract from Stravinsky's Histoire du Soldat.

== Media ==
Piano Concerto No. 3
Very first bars of the third piano concerto from Béla Bartók
