= Dance Suite (Bartók) =

Composition for orchestra by Béla Bartók

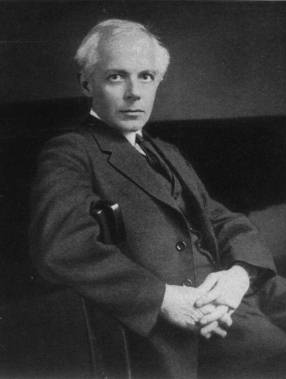
Béla Bartók in 1927

Dance Suite (Hungarian: Táncszvit; German: Tanz-Suite), Sz. 77, BB 86a, is a well-known 1923 orchestral work by the Hungarian composer Béla Bartók. The composer produced a reduction for piano (Sz. 77, BB 86b) in 1925, though this is less commonly performed.

== Composition ==
Béla Bartók composed the Dance Suite in 1923 in order to celebrate the 50th anniversary of the union of the cities Buda and Pest, to form the Hungarian capital Budapest. Then, after its great success, the director of Universal Edition, Emil Hertzka, commissioned from him an arrangement for piano, which was published in 1925. However, he never publicly performed this arrangement, and it was premiered in March 1945, a few months before his death, by his friend György Sándor.

The work premiered on 19 November 1923 in Budapest, alongside Ernst von Dohnányi's Festival Overture and Zoltán Kodály's Psalmus Hungaricus. The British premiere was on 10 August 1925 at the Promenade Concerts, at Queen's Hall, under the baton of Henry Wood.

== Structure ==
This suite has six movements, even though some recordings conceive it as one single full-length movement. A typical performance of the whole work would last approximately fifteen minutes.

1. Moderato
2. Allegro molto
3. Allegro vivace
4. Molto tranquillo
5. Comodo
6. Finale. Allegro

This work consists of five dances with Arabic, Romanian, Wallachian and Hungarian melodies, and a finale that brings together all the previous thematic sketches. There was one more movement, omitted by the composer according to his mathematical principles, which would be placed between the second and the third movement. This movement is called Slovakian Dance, and was finally dismissed and remained unorchestrated.

== Recordings ==
Notable recordings of the orchestral version include:

Orchestra	Conductor	Record Company	Year of Recording	Format
London Philharmonic Orchestra	Georg Solti	Decca Records	1952	LP
RIAS Symphony Orchestra	Ferenc Fricsay	Deutsche Grammophon	1953	LP
Philharmonia Orchestra	Igor Markevitch	His Master's Voice	1954	LP
Philharmonia Hungarica	Antal Doráti	Mercury Records	1958	LP
Symphony Orchestra of Hungarian Radio and Television	György Lehel	Deutsche Grammophon	1962	LP
Orchestre de la Suisse Romande	Ernest Ansermet	Decca Records	1964	LP
New York Philharmonic Orchestra	Pierre Boulez	Columbia	1972	LP
Czech Philharmonic Orchestra	Zdeněk Košler	Panton	1973	LP
Stuttgart Radio Symphony Orchestra	Neville Marriner	Capriccio	1994	CD
Bournemouth Symphony Orchestra	Marin Alsop	Naxos Records	2005	CD
NHK Symphony Orchestra	Paavo Järvi	RCA Red Seal	2020	CD
WDR Symphony Orchestra Cologne	Cristian Măcelaru	Linn	2023	CD

Notable recordings of the piano reduction include:

Piano Solo	Record Company	Year of Recording	Format
András Schiff	Denon Records / Brilliant Classics	1980	CD
Jenő Jandó	Naxos Records	2002	CD
