= Aleksandra Romanić =

Croatian musician

Aleksandra Romaniċ (born 1958 in Zagreb) is a Croatian musician. Born into a family of musicians, she attended the Moscow Tchaikovsky Conservatory and studied with Gyorgy Sandor at the Juilliard School in New York. She is regarded as "one of the best renowned pianists in Bosnia and Herzegovina". She was Professor of Piano at the Academy of Music in Sarajevo for ten years.

== Life ==
Romaniċ was born in 1958 in Zagreb, into a family of musicians. She attended a specialist music high school in Zagreb, and then was awarded a scholarship at the age of sixteen to go to the Moscow Tchaikovsky Conservatory, where she studied with Vera Gornostayeva. Romaniċ graduated in 1981 summa cum laude. Completing her master's degree, she was awarded a Fulbright Scholarship to specialize with Gyorgy Sandor at the Juilliard School in New York.

Awards by several piano competitions led to a worldwide career: she has toured with recitals and orchestras throughout France, Russia, Spain, Czechoslovakia, Malta and the US, and represented . From 1983 until 1993, she was Professor of Piano at the Academy of Music in Sarajevo. She has given masterclasses at universities at the University of Texas in the United States and at the Zagreb Music Academy.

Romaniċ lives in Munich.

She is regarded as "one of the best renowned pianists in Bosnia and Herzegovina". She was awarded the Annual Award of the Association of Musical Artists of Yugoslavia in 1983. From 2004 to 2016 she was an elected member of the Foreign Counsel of the Town Munich, and led the Committee for Culture, Religion and Sport. She was received a “München dankt” award for this work in 2010.
