= String Quartet No. 4 (Bartók) =

1928 composition by Béla Bartók

String Quartet
- No. 4
- by Béla Bartók
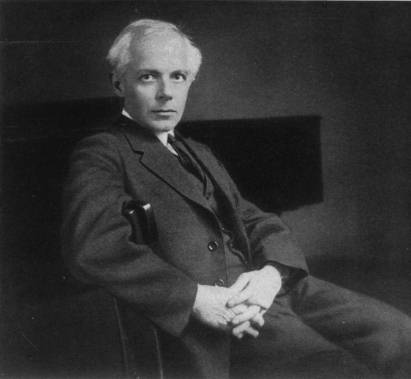
- The composer in 1927
- Catalogue: Sz. 91
- Composed: 1928
- Dedication: Pro Arte Quartet
- Performed: 20 March 1929
- Published: 1929
- Movements: five

The String Quartet No. 4 in C major by Béla Bartók was written from July to September 1928 in Budapest. It is one of six string quartets by Bartok.

The work is dedicated to the Pro Arte Quartet but its first public performance was given by the Waldbauer-Kerpely Quartet in Budapest on 20 March 1929. It was first published in the same year by Universal Edition.

== Overview ==
The work is in five movements:

1. Allegro
2. Prestissimo, con sordino
3. Non troppo lento
4. Allegretto pizzicato
5. Allegro molto

A study of the manuscript sources, as published by László Somfai finds that Bartók originally intended the quartet to have four movements, not five.

This work, like Bartók String Quartet No. 5, and several other pieces by Bartók, exhibits an arch form — the first movement is thematically related to the last, and the second to the fourth, with the third movement standing alone. Also, the outer four movements feature rhythmic sforzandos that cyclically tie them together in terms of climactic areas.

The quartet shares a similar harmonic language to that of the String Quartet No. 3, and as with that work, it has been suggested that Bartók was influenced in his writing by Alban Berg's Lyric Suite (1926) which he had heard in 1927.

The quartet employs a number of extended instrumental techniques. For the whole of the second movement, all four instruments play with mutes, while the entire fourth movement features pizzicato. In the third movement, Bartók sometimes indicates held notes to be played without vibrato, and in various places he asks for glissandi (sliding from one note to another) and so-called Bartók or snap pizzicati, (a pizzicato where the string rebounds against the instrument's fingerboard).

== Analysis ==
Bartók’s musical vocabulary, as demonstrated in his string quartets particularly, departs from traditional use of major and minor keys, focusing more on the chromatic scale and attempting to utilize each note equally. Regardless, Bartók doesn’t follow any form of serialism, instead dividing the chromatic scale into symmetrical units, with tonal centers being based on “axes of symmetry”. He also incorporates whole-tone, pentatonic, and octatonic scales — as well as diatonic and heptatonia seconda scales — as subsets of the chromatic scale.

His use of these subset scales allowed him to incorporate a wide range of folk music in an expanded harmonic system. Indeed, his original studies and settings of many examples gleaned from his extensive explorations of the Hungarian countryside and Eastern and Central Europe served as a major influence upon his expanded musical vocabulary.

Bartók held a long fascination with mathematics and how it pertained to music. He experimented with incorporating the golden section and the Fibonacci sequence into his writing. Though these fascinations aren’t obviously present in his Fourth String Quartet, Derek Locke has proposed that the quartet is structured using both the golden section and numbers from the Fibonacci series. He maintains that their use was "not so much a matter of 'aesthetic' proportions as a method for avoiding arbitrariness'.

Movements I and V share similar motifs; the second theme in the first movement is prominent in the fifth. Movements II and IV share similar ideas as well, but the ideas present within these two movements can be considered variations on themes presented earlier, expanding and building on ideas presented in the first and fifth movements. Movement III differs from the other four movements in that it is textured and quiet.

The symmetry of the movements isn’t limited only to the themes; the lengths of the movements show symmetry as well. The first, third and fifth movements are approximately six minutes long, whereas the second and fourth are shorter, at about three minutes each.

=== I. Allegro ===
Movement I utilizes whole-tone elements. Though not traditionally tonal, it is centered on ‘C’. The movement gradually progresses from cluster-like elements to full chords. This, in part, helps with building tension through the movement’s six minutes.

=== II. Prestissimo, con sordino ===
The second movement moves quicker than the first, giving off a hurried feeling. The chromatic scale is widely utilized, starting off in the lower registers and being answered in higher registers. Fast scales, trills, and vibrato are all used to add color and texture. The pentatonic scale is present and apparent throughout. Additionally, the strings are used to produce horn-like and percussive effects.

=== III. Non troppo lento ===
The third movement includes a great example of Bartók's night music style. It completely departs from the first two movements in that it is more consonant, widely using diatonic and many folk-like elements. Usage of the pentatonic scale is more apparent.

=== IV. Allegretto pizzicato ===
The fourth movement is similar to the second and is faster than the previous, instilling the same hurry as in the first two movements. The musicians play pizzicato throughout. Bartók also utilizes Bartók pizzicato throughout the movement. Staying symmetrical, the music references and builds on ideas in movement II.

=== V. Allegro molto ===
The final movement mirrors the first, the second theme of the first movement seeing extensive use. The randomly accentuated quarter notes sound percussive and horn-like. Inversions and retrogrades of the theme are heard throughout the movement, utilized in different octaves. Overall, the fifth movement is more liberal in using variations of themes present in the first movement.

== Discography ==
Year	Performer	Label
1950	Juilliard String Quartet	Sony Classical - 19439831102
1963	Juilliard String Quartet	Sony Classical - 5062312
1988	Emerson Quartet	Deutsche Grammophon
1997	Takács Quartet	Decca
2019	Quatuor Ragazze	Channel Classics
