= List of string quartets by Béla Bartók =

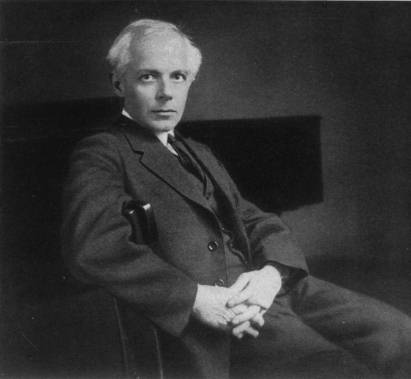
Béla Bartók in 1927

This is a list of string quartets by Béla Bartók. The Hungarian composer wrote a total of six string quartets, for two violins, viola and cello:

== List ==
- String Quartet No. 1 (1909), Op.7, Sz. 40, BB 52
- String Quartet No. 2 (1917), Op.17, Sz. 67, BB 75
- String Quartet No. 3 (1927), Sz. 85, BB 93
- String Quartet No. 4 (1928), Sz. 91, BB 95
- String Quartet No. 5 (1934), Sz. 102, BB 110
- String Quartet No. 6 (1939), Sz. 114, BB 119

== Posterity ==
Notable composers who have been influenced by them include:

- Benjamin Britten, particularly in the Sonata in C for Cello and Piano
- Elliott Carter, who refers in the opening of his own First String Quartet to Bartók's Sixth Quartet
- Chen Yi
- Edison Denisov, whose Second Quartet is closely related to Bartók's Fifth Quartet
- Franco Donatoni, who was deeply impressed when he heard a broadcast of Bartók's Fourth Quartet
- Robert Fripp, who mentions them as an influence on the band King Crimson
- Miloslav Ištvan
- György Kurtág, whose Opp. 1 and 28 both owe a great deal to Bartók's quartets
- György Ligeti, whose two string quartets both owe a great deal to Bartók's quartets
- Bruno Maderna
- George Perle, who credits the Bartók Fourth and Fifth Quartets as precedents for his use of arrays of chords related to one another by different types of symmetry
- Walter Piston
- Steve Reich, who described them in an interview as "the greatest set of quartets since Beethoven"
- Kim Dzmitrïyevich Tsesakow
- Wilfried Westerlinck
- Stefan Wolpe, who explained in a public lecture how he had derived ideas from Bartók's Fourth Quartet
- Xu Yongsan
- Jouni Kaipainen, credited openly Bartók's quartets as his model.

== Recordings ==
Key recordings of the complete cycle include:

- Emerson String Quartet, Deutsche Grammophon, released 1990.
- Hagen Quartet
- Juilliard String Quartet:
  - Recorded 1949, New York. Robert Mann and Robert Koff, violins; Raphael Hillyer, viola; Arthur Winograd, cello. Three LPs, 12 in., monaural. Columbia Masterworks ML 4278/4279/4280.
  - Recorded May and September, 1963, Columbia 30th Street Studios, New York. Robert Mann and Isidore Cohen, violins; Raphael Hillyer, viola; Claus Adam, cello. Three LPs, 12 in., stereo. Columbia Masterworks D3L 317 (set): ML 6102, 6103, 6104. New York: Columbia Masterworks, 1965.
  - Recorded 13–23 May 1981, Columbia 30th Street Studios, New York. Robert Mann and Earl Carlyss, violins; Samuel Rhodes, viola; Claus Adam, cello.
- Lindsay String Quartet
- Takács Quartet, Decca 289 455 297-2. Released 1998.

== See also ==
- List of compositions by Béla Bartók
