= String Quartet No. 5 (Bartók) =

String Quartet
- No. 5
- by Béla Bartók
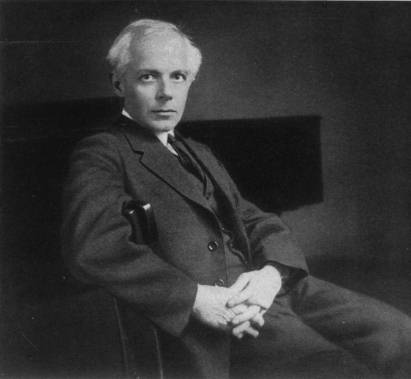
- The composer in 1927
- Catalogue: Sz. 102; BB 110
- Composed: 1934
- Dedication: Elizabeth Sprague Coolidge
- Performed: 9 April 1935: Washington, D.C.
- Published: 1936
- Movements: five

The String Quartet No. 5, Sz. 102, BB 110 by Béla Bartók was written between 6 August and 6 September 1934. It is one of six string quartets by Bartok. The work was commissioned by Elizabeth Sprague Coolidge and is dedicated to her. It was premiered by the Kolisch Quartet in Washington, D.C., on 8 April 1935 and first published in 1936 by Universal Edition.

== Music ==
The string quartet is in five movements:

1. Allegro
2. Adagio molto
3. Scherzo: alla bulgarese
4. Andante
5. Finale: Allegro vivace

Like the String Quartet No. 4 and several other works by Bartók, the piece is in an arch form.

Additionally, the first movement, which is in a sort of sonata form, is itself arch-like, in that each section of exposition is given in reverse order during the recapitulation – the melodies of each section are also inverted (played upside-down). Bartók himself pointed out that the keys used in the movement ascend in the steps of the whole tone scale: the exposition is in B♭, C and D; the development is in E; and the recapitulation is in F♯, A♭ and B♭.

The three middle movements are all in ternary form, of which the third is in the unevenly-divided aksak time signatures typical of Bulgarian folk music: 4+2+3/8 for the main scherzo, and 3+2+2+3/8 in the trio. The last movement is again arch-like: Bartók described it as being in the form ABCB′A′ with a coda to round things off.

The two slow movements, the second Adagio molto and the fourth Andante are great examples of Bartók's night music style: eerie dissonances, imitations of natural sounds, and lonely melodies.

== Discography ==
Year	Performers	Label
1950	Juilliard String Quartet	Sony Classical - 19439831102
1963	Juilliard String Quartet	Sony Classical - 5062312
1988	Emerson Quartet	Deutsche Grammophon
1996	Tokyo String Quartet	RCA Victor Red Seal – 09026-68286-2
1997	Takács Quartet	Decca
2008	Belcea Quartet	EMI Classics – 3 94400 2
