= Slovakian Dance =

Béla Bartók solo piano piece

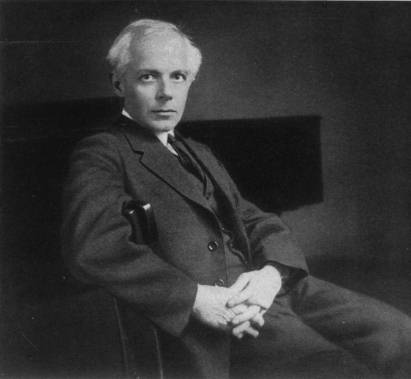
Béla Bartók in 1927

Slovakian Dance (Note: Even though the correct adjective would be slovak, the only edition of this work published in 1999 refers to it as Slovakian Dance.) is a piece for solo piano by Hungarian composer Béla Bartók. It was presumably composed in 1923, but it was not published until 1999.

This scherzo-style composition was meant to be placed between the second and the third movement of Bartók's Dance Suite, but he eventually refused because of his mathematical principles, as placing it in the Suite would ruin the proportion of the whole work. Since Dance Suite was an orchestral suite, this Slovakian Dance remained as a sketch, unpublished and unorchestrated, until his son, Peter Bartók, made slight changes for it to be published in 1999 by Universal Edition. As this is one of the sketches that he dismissed, there is no identification number for this composition, and most catalogues do not include it.

== Structure ==
Slovakian Dance is scored for a solo piano and takes around 2 minutes to perform. It has a total of 92 bars and three different sections.

The first section is the ritornell that was used in movements 1, 2, and 4 of Bartok's Dance Suite, marked Tranquillo in the score. It acts as a short introduction, as well as a placing element within its original piece, as the Dance was meant to be played after a ritornello. This section has 17 bars and is separated by a double bar. The second section, the Slovakian Dance itself, is marked Allegretto in the score and generally gravitates towards F major, even though the key signature makes no specifications. This lively, 2/4 dance, ends in bar 81, when the ritornell is reprised for the last few bars, marked Lento in the score.

== Notable recordings ==
Notable recordings of this work include:

Piano Solo	Record Company	Year of Recording	Format
Jenő Jandó	Naxos Records	2005	CD

== See also ==
- Dance Suite (Bartók)
