= Sonata for Solo Violin (Bartók) =

Musical piece

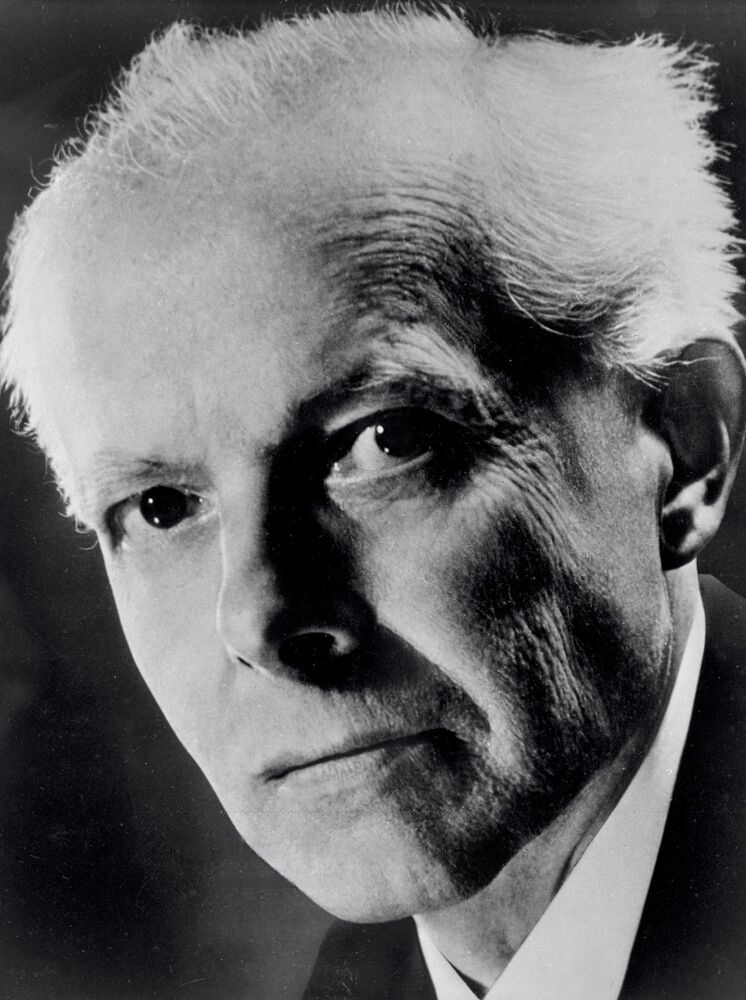
Béla Bartók in 1943

The Sonata for Solo Violin Sz. 117, BB 124, is a sonata for unaccompanied violin composed by Béla Bartók. It was premiered by Yehudi Menuhin, to whom it was dedicated, in New York on 26 November 1944.

== Background ==
Violinist Yehudi Menuhin commissioned a work for solo violin from Bartók in November 1943. It was written in New York and in Asheville, North Carolina, where Bartók underwent treatment for leukemia. Bartók finished composing the piece in March 1944. He wrote letters to Menuhin in April and June 1944 to agree on minor changes to make the Sonata easier to play.

== Structure and analysis ==
The Sonata consists of four movements:

1. Tempo di ciaccona
2. Fuga. Risoluto, non troppo vivo
3. Melodia. Adagio
4. Presto.

The Tempo di ciaccona is essentially a sonata-form movement (Note: Anderson in his liner notes writes that it is rather a sonata-form movement than a chaconne.) written somewhat in the style of a chaconne, even though it is not its form. It is full of typical Hungarian folk intervals and harmonies. The Fuga begins with a four-voice fugue on a pulsating, staccato melody. After a section where the melody is accompanied quietly with fast running notes, it returns as a series of chords, alternately played with the bow and plucked in inversion. Nevertheless, it is not a strict fugue, as every episode introduces new material to the subject.

The Melodia begins with a lyrical melody, stated alone and in all different registers of the instrument. It continues in sixths, octaves, and tenths, accompanied by trills and tremolos. The Presto alternates between a very quiet, fast, bumblebee-like passage played with a mute, and a cheerful melody. Bartók originally wrote the rapid passages in quarter-tones, but many violinists choose to perform a version, suggested by Menuhin, that only uses the standard 12 notes of Western classical music. Three contrasting themes appear throughout this movement, all of which re-appear in the final coda.

The Solo Sonata presents violinists with many difficulties and uses the full gamut of violin techniques: several notes played simultaneously (multiple stops), artificial harmonics, left-hand pizzicato executed simultaneously with a melody played with the bow, and wide leaps between pitches.
