= Pizzicato =

Playing technique for string instruments

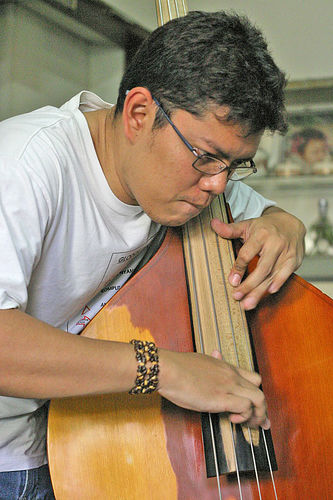
Jazz bass walking bass lines are traditionally played with pizzicato; jazz pizzicato technique, shown above, is different from traditional pizzicato technique.

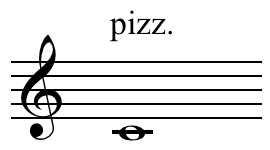
Middle C, pizzicato

Pizzicato (/ˌpɪtsɪˈkɑːtoʊ/, Italian: [pittsiˈkaːto]; translated as 'pinched', and sometimes roughly as 'plucked') is a playing technique that involves plucking the strings of a string instrument. The exact technique varies somewhat depending on the type of instrument:

- On bowed string instruments it is a method of playing by plucking the strings with the fingers, rather than using the bow. This produces a very different sound from bowing, short and percussive rather than sustained.
- On keyboard string instruments, such as the piano, pizzicato may be employed (although rarely seen in traditional repertoire, this technique has been normalized in contemporary music, with ample examples by George Crumb, Tōru Takemitsu, Helmut Lachenmann, and others) as one of the variety of techniques involving direct manipulation of the strings known collectively as "string piano".
- On the guitar, it is a muted form of plucking, which bears an audible resemblance to pizzicato on a bowed string instrument with its relatively shorter sustain. It is also known (especially in non-classical guitar) as palm muting.

When a string is struck or plucked, including pizzicato, sound waves are generated that do not belong to a harmonic series as when a string is bowed. This complex timbre is called inharmonicity. The inharmonicity of a string depends on its physical characteristics, such as tension, composition, diameter and length. The inharmonicity disappears when strings are bowed because the bow's stick-slip action is periodic, so it drives all of the resonances of the string at exactly harmonic ratios, even if it has to drive them slightly off their natural frequency.

== History ==
The first recognised use in classical music is found in Tobias Hume’s The First Part of Ayres (1605). Instruction is given to ‘‘play one straine with your fingers, the other with your Bow’, ‘to be plaide with your fingers … your Bow ever in your hand’’. (Morrow et al. 2021) Another early use is found in Claudio Monteverdi's Il combattimento di Tancredi e Clorinda (around 1638), in which the players are instructed to use two fingers of their right hand to pluck the strings. Later, in 1756, Leopold Mozart in his Versuch einer gründlichen Violinschule instructs the player to use the index finger of the right hand. This has remained the most usual way to execute a pizzicato, though sometimes the middle finger is used. The bow is held in the hand at the same time unless there is enough time to put it down and pick it up again between bowed passages.

=== Uses in various styles of music ===
In jazz and bluegrass, and the few popular music styles which use double bass (such as French modern chanson, American psychobilly and rockabilly), pizzicato is the usual way to play the double bass. This is unusual for a violin-family instrument, because regardless whether violin-family instruments are being used in jazz (e.g., jazz violin), popular, traditional (e.g., Bluegrass fiddle) or Classical music, they are usually played with the bow for most of a performance. In classical double bass playing, pizzicato is often performed with the bow held in the hand; as such, the string is usually only plucked with a single finger. In contrast, in jazz, bluegrass, and other non-Classical styles, the player is not usually holding a bow and is therefore free to use two or three fingers to pluck the string.

In classical music, however, string instruments are most usually played with the bow, and composers give specific indications to play pizzicato where required. Pieces in classical music that are played entirely pizzicato include:

- J. S. Bach: the ninth movement of the Magnificat (1723–1733)
- Johann Strauss II and Josef Strauss: Pizzicato Polka (1869) (Note: Usually accompanied by a glockenspiel.)
- Edvard Grieg: Act IV – Anitra's Dance in Peer Gynt (1874)
- Léo Delibes: the "Divertissement: Pizzicati" from Act 3 of the ballet Sylvia (1876)
- Pyotr Ilyich Tchaikovsky: the third movement of the 4th symphony (1877–78)
- Johann Strauss II: Neue Pizzicato Polka (1892)
- Helmer Alexandersson: the third movement of his second symphony (1919)
- Béla Bartók: the fourth movement of the String Quartet No. 4 (1928)
- Benjamin Britten: the second movement of the Simple Symphony (1934)
- Leroy Anderson: Jazz Pizzicato (1938) and Plink, Plank, Plunk! (1951)

Antonio Vivaldi, in the "Ah Ch'Infelice Sempre" section of his cantata Cessate, omai cessate, combined both pizzicato and bowed instruments to create a unique sound. He also included pizzicato in the second movement of "Winter" from The Four Seasons.

== Notation ==
In music notation, a composer will normally indicate the performer should use pizzicato with the abbreviation pizz. A return to bowing is indicated by the Italian term arco or bog. A left-hand pizzicato is usually indicated by writing a small cross above the note, and a Bartók pizzicato is often indicated by a circle with a small vertical line through the top of it above the note in question or by writing Bartók pizz at the start of the relevant passage.

In classical music, arco playing is the default assumption; thus, if a music notation part starts and no indication is given as to whether the notes are arco or pizz, the player assumes that the notes are bowed.

== Bowed string instrument technique ==
=== Practical implications ===
If a string player has to play pizzicato for a long period of time, the performer may put down the bow. Violinists and violists may also hold the instrument in the "banjo position" (resting horizontally on the lap), and pluck the strings with the thumb of the right hand. This technique is rarely used, and usually only in movements which are pizzicato throughout. A technique similar to this, where the strings are actually strummed like a guitar, is called for in the 4th movement of Rimsky-Korsakov's Capriccio Espagnol (Scena e canto gitano), where the violins, violas, and cellos are instructed to play pizzicato "quasi guitara", the music here consists of three and four-note chords, which are fingered and strummed much like the instrument being imitated.

=== Other pizzicato techniques ===
Another colorful pizzicato technique used in the Rimsky-Korsakov piece mentioned above is two-handed pizzicato, indicated by the markings m.s. and m.d. (for mano sinistra, 'left hand', and mano destra, 'right hand'); here, the open E string is plucked alternately in rapid succession by the left and right hands.

The music notation for left hand pizzicato

One can also use the left hand fingers for pizzicato, either when they are not in use or as they are leaving their previous position. This allows pizzicati in places where there would not normally be time to bring the right hand from or to the bowing position. Use of left-hand pizzicato is relatively uncommon and is most often found in the violin solo repertoire; two famous examples of left-hand pizzicato are Paganini's 24th Caprice and Sarasate's Zigeunerweisen. Left hand pizzicato can also be used while bowed notes are being held, an effect appearing primarily in repertoire of the late 19th century and beyond. Examples of this technique can be found in the works of Wieniawski, Berg (Violin Concerto), Stravinsky (Three Pieces for String Quartet) and many others.

Maurice Delage calls for slurred pizzicati in the cello part of his Quatre poèmes hindous for soprano and chamber orchestra. This is achieved by playing one note, and then stopping a new note on the same string without plucking the string again. This technique (known as "hammering-on" on guitar) is rarely used on bowed instruments.

Musical notation for Bartók pizzicato

A further variation is a particularly strong pizzicato where the string is plucked vertically by snapping and rebounds off the fingerboard of the instrument. This is known as snap pizzicato or Bartók pizzicato, after one of the first composers to use it extensively (e.g. in the 4th movement of his Fourth String Quartet, 1928). Gustav Mahler famously employs this kind of pizzicato in the third movement of his Seventh Symphony, in which he provides the cellos and double basses with the footnote "pluck so hard that the strings hit the wood" in bar 401.

On the double bass, this style of snap pizzicato, or "slapping", was used in jazz since the 1920s and later used in rockabilly. Because an unamplified double bass is generally the quietest instrument in a jazz band, many players of the 1920s and 1930s used the slap style, slapping and pulling the strings so that they make a rhythmic "slap" sound against the fingerboard. The slap style cuts through the sound of a band better than simply plucking the strings, and allowed the bass to be more easily heard on early sound recordings, as the recording equipment of that time did not favor low frequencies.

Bartók also made use of pizzicato glissandi, executed by plucking a note and then sliding the stopping finger up or down the string. This technique can be heard in his Music for Strings, Percussion and Celesta.
