= György Sándor =

Hungarian pianist and writer (1912–2005)

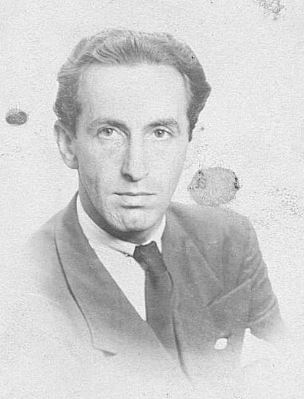
György Sándor

György Sándor (Hungarian pronunciation: [ˈɟørɟ ˈʃaːndor]; 21 September 1912 – 9 December 2005) was a Hungarian pianist and writer.

== Early years ==
Sándor was born in Budapest. He studied at the Liszt Academy in Budapest under Béla Bartók and Zoltán Kodály, and debuted as a performer in 1930. He toured as a concert pianist through the 1930s, making his Carnegie Hall debut in 1939. He became an American citizen and served in the Army Signal Corps and the Intelligence and Special Services from 1942 to 1944.

== Friends with Bartók ==
Sándor remained friends with Bartók throughout his life, and was one of only ten people who attended Bartók's funeral in 1945. Sándor played the premiere of Bartók's Piano Concerto No. 3 on 8 February 1946 with the Philadelphia Orchestra conducted by Eugene Ormandy in Philadelphia, Pennsylvania. The performance was repeated on 26 February 1946 by the same ensemble in Carnegie Hall, New York, and recorded for Columbia Masterworks in April 1946.

== Concert artist ==
Following World War II, he returned to the concert stage. His technique was described as "Lisztian" and his repertoire universal, although later in his career his playing of Bartók was much in demand. Initially he recorded numerous piano works by Bach, Beethoven, Brahms, Chopin, Liszt, Rachmaninov, Schumann and others for Columbia Masterworks. Then with Vox, he recorded the complete works for solo piano of Zoltán Kodály and of Sergei Prokofiev; and the complete piano works of Béla Bartók; for the latter he won the Grand Prix du Disque of the Charles Cros Academy in 1965.

== Family ==
In 1950 he married Christa, née Satzger de Bálványos, the divorced wife of Archduke Karl Pius of Austria. They had one son, Michael, and were divorced.

== Teaching ==
Sándor taught at the Southern Methodist University, then at the University of Michigan from 1961 to 1981, and from 1982, at the Juilliard School. He continued to teach and perform into his nineties. His pupils included Hélène Grimaud, Deniz Arman Gelenbe, György Sebők, Aleksandra Romanić, Christina Kiss, Barbara Nissman, Ian Pace, Ljuba Moiz, Jungwon Jin, Derek Wieland, Charis Dimaras, fortepiano performer Malcolm Bilson, renowned teacher, Dr. J.D. Kelly, and composers Ezequiel Viñao, and Donald Bohlen.

== Honorary degree ==
In 1996 New York University awarded Sándor an honorary doctorate.

== Manuscripts and published works ==
He wrote a book "On Piano Playing: Motion, Sound, Expression", published by Schirmer Books, which is one of the most rational and clear accounts of piano technique. "Today more than ever, audiences mistake the excessively tense muscular activities of the performer for an intense musical experience, and all too often we see the public impressed and awed by convulsive distortions and spastic gyrations." Writing in The Guardian newspaper, Leo Black commented "musical performance desperately needs the sense of rightness, completeness and economy that pervaded his playing and thinking".

"On Piano Playing" details approaches to many problems that pianists face. Sándor emphasized the use of gravity, an endless source of energy, during playing. Ideas on memorizing are also addressed. Importantly, "On Piano Playing" corrects these common misconceptions: pianists only play with their fingers and only a few have the physical ability to play the piano.

A manuscript of a book on his mentor Béla Bartók and his music remains unpublished.

He produced several piano transcriptions, including a fantastically difficult arrangement of The Sorcerer's Apprentice by Dukas (pub. 1950), and the first two movements (Tempo di Ciaccona and Fuga) of Bartók's Sonata for Solo Violin (first perf. New York 1975; pub. 1977).

He also edited and published Bartók's own unpublished piano arrangement (made in January 1944) of the Concerto for Orchestra, at the request of the composer's son in 1985. It was published in 2001, and has been recorded by Sándor. Sándor wrote in his introduction to the edition: "It was agreed that the primary goal would not be to make the piano score easier to play, but to make it playable at all. Furthermore, since Bartók's piano score contains only the first ending of the last movement, my role was to provide a reading for the second (alternative) ending. Bartók wrote the second ending to avoid the rather abrupt conclusion of this grandiose work, and this is now accepted as the standard version of the last movement." He also edited the works for solo piano of Sergei Prokofiev.

== Death ==
He died in New York City of heart failure at age 93.

== Media ==
- György Sándor plays Béla Bartók: Concerto for Orchestra, transcription for piano
- György Sándor plays Bach-Liszt Fantasy & Fugue in G minor
