= Music for Strings, Percussion and Celesta =

1937 composition by Béla Bartók

- by Béla Bartók
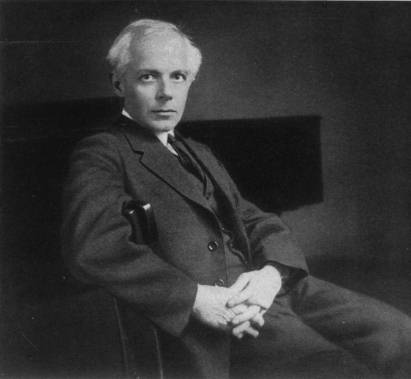
- The composer in 1927
- Catalogue: Sz. 106, BB 114
- Composed: 1936
- Dedication: Paul Sacher
- Published: 1937
- Movements: Four

Premiere
- Date: January 21, 1937
- Location: Basel, Switzerland
- Conductor: Paul Sacher
- Performers: Basler Kammerorchester

Music for Strings, Percussion and Celesta, Sz. 106, BB 114 is one of the best-known compositions by the Hungarian composer Béla Bartók. Commissioned by Paul Sacher to celebrate the tenth anniversary of the chamber orchestra Basler Kammerorchester, the score is dated 7 September 1936.

The work was premiered in Basel, Switzerland, on January 21, 1937 by the chamber orchestra conducted by Sacher, and was published the same year by Universal Edition.

== Analysis ==
As its title indicates, the piece is written for string instruments (violins, violas, cellos, double basses, and harp), percussion instruments (xylophone, snare drum, cymbals, tam-tam, bass drum, and timpani) and celesta. The ensemble also includes a piano, which, due to the hammer mechanisms inside, can also be considered a percussion instrument; the celesta player joins the pianist in some four-hands passages. Bartók divides the strings into two ensembles which, he directs, should be placed antiphonally on opposite sides of the stage, and he makes use of antiphonal effects particularly in the second and fourth movements.

The piece is in four movements: the first and third slow; the second and fourth quick. All the movements are written without a key signature:

1. Andante tranquillo
2. Allegro
3. Adagio
4. Allegro molto

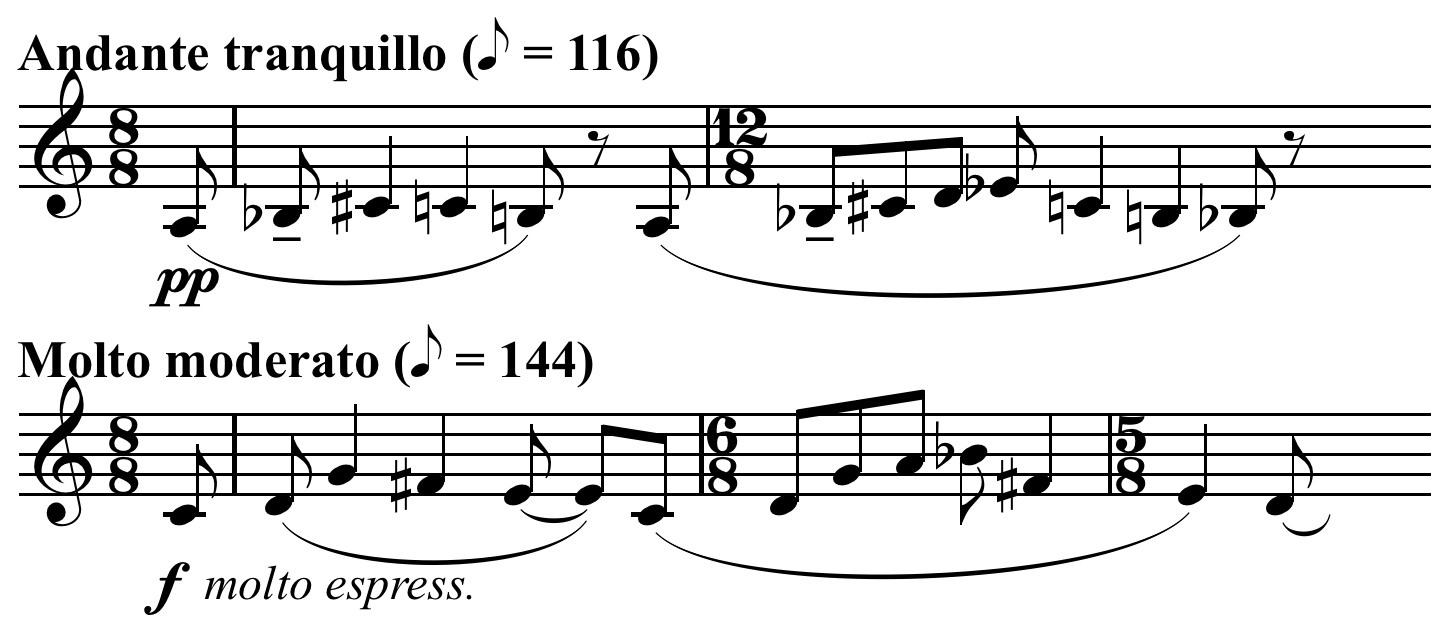
Example of interval expansion: movement I, mm. 1–5 and movement IV, mm. 204–209.

The first movement is a slow fugue with a constantly changing time signature. The movement is based around the note A, on which it begins and ends. It begins with muted strings, and as more voices enter, the texture thickens and the music becomes louder, coming to a climax on E♭, a tritone away from A. Mutes are then removed, and the music becomes gradually quieter over gentle celesta arpeggios. The movement ends with the second phrase of the fugue subject played softly over its inversion. The first movement can be seen as a basis for material in the later movements; the fugue subject recurs in different guises throughout the piece.

The second movement is quick, with a theme in 2/4 time which is transformed into 3/8 time towards the end. It is marked with loud syncopated piano and percussion accents in a whirling dance, evolving in an extended pizzicato section, with a piano concerto-like conclusion.

The third movement is slow, an example of what is often called Bartók's "night music". It features timpani glissandi, an unusual technique at the time of the work's composition, as well as a prominent xylophone part. The rhythm of the xylophone solo that opens the third movement is a "written-out accelerando/ritardando" that follows the Fibonacci sequence, the notated rhythm representing 1:1:2:3:5:8:5:3:2:1:1 notes per beat in sequence.

The fourth and final movement, which begins with notes on the timpani and strummed pizzicato chords on the strings, has the character of a lively folk dance.

== Popular culture ==
The popularity of Music for Strings, Percussion and Celesta is demonstrated by the use of themes from this work in films and popular music. The second movement accompanies "Craig's Dance of Despair and Disillusionment" in the film Being John Malkovich. The Adagio was used as the theme music for The Vampira Show (1954–55). The movement was also featured in the Encyclopaedia Britannica film The Solar System (1977) and Stanley Kubrick's film The Shining (1980). Jerry Goldsmith wrote in the style of this piece for the 1962 film Freud: The Secret Passion. It also was the soundtrack for the 1978 Australian film Money Movers. Anthony "Ant" Davis of the hip hop group Atmosphere samples the piece on the song "Aspiring Sociopath". The first movement is used in Joanna Hogg's 2022 film The Eternal Daughter.

The architect Steven Holl used the overlapping strettos in this piece as a model for the form of the Stretto House (1989) in Dallas, Texas.

The novel City of Night (1962) by John Rechy makes reference to Music for Strings Percussion and Celesta, a work that haunts the main character. The piece is also mentioned in John Fowles's novel The Collector; one of the main characters, Miranda Grey, calls it "The loveliest."

Much of the music from this collection, along with The Miraculous Mandarin, can be heard as underscore for two Doctor Who stories: 1967's "The Enemy of the World" and 1968's "The Web of Fear".

Fargo season 5, episode 3, "The Paradox of Intermediate Transactions", plays part of the movement.

== Discography ==
The first recording of the work was made in 1949 by the Los Angeles Chamber Symphony under Harold Byrns.

Other recordings include:

- Herbert von Karajan and the Philharmonia Orchestra (1949 – the second recording of the work)
- Ferenc Fricsay and the RIAS Symphony Orchestra (1954)
- Sir Adrian Boult and the Philharmonic Promenade Orchestra (~1955)
- Fritz Reiner and the Chicago Symphony Orchestra (1958)
- Leopold Stokowski and the Leopold Stokowski Orchestra (1959)
- György Lehel and the Hungarian Radio Orchestra (1961)
- Leonard Bernstein and the New York Philharmonic (1961)
- Herbert von Karajan and the Berlin Philharmonic (1961)
- Antal Doráti and the London Symphony Orchestra
- Yevgeny Mravinsky and the Leningrad Philharmonic Orchestra (1965 & 1967 {live})
- Pierre Boulez and the BBC Symphony Orchestra (1967)
- Neville Marriner and the Academy of St Martin in the Fields (1970)
- Herbert von Karajan and the Berlin Philharmonic (1973)
- Antal Doráti and the Philharmonia Hungarica (1974)
- Mariss Jansons and the Oslo Philharmonic
- Eugene Ormandy and the Philadelphia Orchestra (1979)
- Moshe Atzmon and the Tokyo Metropolitan Symphony Orchestra (1981)
- Charles Dutoit and the Montreal Symphony Orchestra (1987)
- Iván Fischer and the Budapest Festival Orchestra (1987)
- Georg Solti and the Chicago Symphony Orchestra (1989–90)
- Pierre Boulez and the Chicago Symphony Orchestra (1994)
- Jean-Jacques Kantorow and the Tapiola Sinfonietta (1996)
- Jukka-Pekka Saraste and the Toronto Symphony Orchestra (1997)
- Zoltán Kocsis and the Hungarian National Philharmonic (2010)
- Marin Alsop and the Baltimore Symphony Orchestra (2012)
- Paavo Järvi and the NHK Symphony Orchestra (2020)
- Susanna Mälkki and the Helsinki Philharmonic Orchestra (2021)
