= String Quartet No. 3 (Bartók) =

String Quartet
- No. 3
- by Béla Bartók
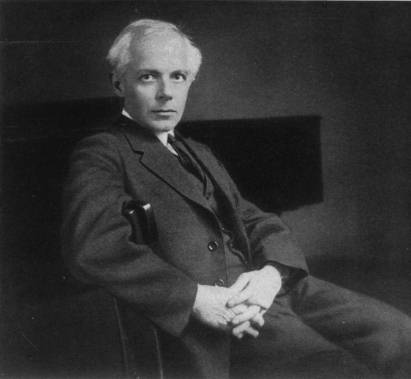
- The composer in 1927
- Catalogue: Sz. 85
- Composed: 1927
- Dedication: Musical Society Fund of Philadelphia
- Performed: 19 February 1929
- Published: 1929
- Movements: four

String Quartet No. 3 by Béla Bartók was written in September 1927 in Budapest. It is one of six string quartets by Bartók.

The work is dedicated to the Musical Society Fund of Philadelphia and was entered into an international competition for chamber music run by the organization. It won the $6,000 first prize jointly with a work by Alfredo Casella. The Waldbauer-Kerpely Quartet premiered the piece on 19 February 1929 in London's Wigmore Hall.

The piece was first published in 1929 by Universal Edition.

== Music ==
It has often been suggested that Bartók was inspired to write the piece after hearing a performance of Alban Berg's Lyric Suite (1926) in 1927. The piece is the most tightly constructed of Bartók's six string quartets, the whole deriving from a relatively small amount of thematic material integrated into a single continuous structure. It is also Bartók's shortest quartet, with a typical performance lasting around 15 minutes.

The work is even more harmonically adventurous and contrapuntally complex than Bartók's previous two string quartets and explores a number of extended instrumental techniques, including sul ponticello (playing with the bow as close as possible to the bridge), col legno (playing with the wood rather than the hair of the bow), and glissandi (sliding from one note to another).

The string quartet is in one continuous stretch with no breaks but is divided in the score into four parts:

1. Prima parte: Moderato
2. Seconda parte: Allegro
3. Ricapitulazione della prima parte: Moderato
4. Coda: Allegro molto

The mood of the first part is quite bleak, contrasting with the second part, which is livelier and provides evidence of the inspiration Bartók drew from Hungarian folk music, with dance-like melodies to the fore. Though Bartók called the third section a "recapitulation", it is not a repetition of the music from the prima parte, but varied and simplified. Although not marked as such, the coda is in fact a telescoped recapitulation of the seconda parte.

== Discography ==
| Year | Performers | Label |
|---|---|---|
| 1950 | Juilliard String Quartet | Sony Classical - 19439831102 |
| 1963 | Juilliard String Quartet | Sony Classical - 5062312 |
| 1988 | Emerson Quartet | Deutsche Grammophon |
| 1997 | Takács Quartet | Decca |
