= Walzer =

Walzer may refer to:

== Waltzes ==
- Cagliostro-Walzer (Cagliostro Waltz)
- Döblinger Réunion-Walzer (Döbling Reunion Waltz)
- Ewiger Walzer (The Eternal Waltz)
- Gesellschafts-Walzer (Association's Waltz)
- Kaiser-Walzer (Emperor Waltz)
- Kettenbrücke-Walzer (Chain Bridge Waltz)
- Kuss-Walzer (Kiss Waltz)
- Lagunen-Walzer (Lagoon Waltz)
- Schatz-Walzer (Treasure Waltz)
- Täuberln-Walzer (Little Doves Waltz)
- Wiener Launen-Walzer (Vienna Fancies Waltz)

== Operas and operettas ==
- Der letzte Walzer (The Last Waltz)
- Hoheit tanzt Walzer (Her Highness Dances the Waltz)
- Walzer aus Wien (Waltzes in Vienna or The Great Waltz)

== Films ==
- Der himmlische Walzer (The Heavenly Waltz)
- Ein Walzer von Strauß (A Waltz by Strauss)
- Es war einmal ein Walzer (Once There Was a Waltz)
- Unsterblicher Walzer (Immortal Waltz)
- Waldheims Walzer (The Waldheim Waltz)

== Other uses ==
- Walzer (surname)
- Wälzer (surname)
- La Ola Walzer (The Wave Waltzer)
- Liebeslieder Walzer (disambiguation) (Love Songs Waltz)
- Vienna Walzer Orchestra

== See also ==
- Waltzer (surname)
