= Op. 6 =

In music, Op. 6 stands for Opus number 6. Compositions that are assigned this number include:

- Barber – Cello Sonata
- Bartók – 14 Bagatelles
- Beethoven – Sonata in D major for piano four-hands, Op. 6
- Berg – Three Pieces for Orchestra
- Chopin – Mazurkas, Op. 6
- Corelli – Christmas Concerto
- Corelli – Concerto grosso in D major, Op. 6, No. 4
- Corelli – Twelve concerti grossi, Op. 6
- Enescu – Violin Sonata No. 2
- Handel – Concerti grossi, Op. 6
- Paganini – Violin Concerto No. 1
- Rachmaninoff – Morceaux de salon, Op. 6
- Reger – Drei Chöre, Op. 6
- Rimsky-Korsakov – Fantasy on Serbian Themes
- Schoenberg – Concerto for String Quartet and Orchestra
- Schumann – Davidsbündlertänze
- Scriabin – Piano Sonata No. 1
- Sibelius – Cassazione, for orchestra (1904, revised 1905)
- Strauss – Cello Sonata
- Strauss – Wiener Launen-Walzer
- Suk – Serenade for Strings
- Tchaikovsky – None but the Lonely Heart
- Vivaldi – Six Violin Concertos, Op. 6
- York – Les Gentilhommes
