= OP9 =

OP9 may refer to:

- OP9 cell, a cell line
- Op. 9 (disambiguation), opus number 9, various musical compositions
- Candidate phylum OP9, former name for Atribacteria
