= Walser (surname) =

Walser is a surname of German origin. It may be a variant of Walliser, or derived from Wals near Salzburg, Austria. The Walser people speak Walser German, and are descendants of people who migrated from Wallis, Switzerland, to other Alpine regions.

== People ==
- Al Walser (born 1976), German-born Liechtensteiner singer, songwriter, and record producer
- Alissa Walser (born 1961), German writer and artist; daughter of Martin Walser
- Andreas Walser (1908–1930), Swiss painter
- Andreas Walser (athlete) (born 1996), German para-athlete
- David Walser (1923–1993), British Anglican rector and archdeacon
- Derrick Walser (born 1978), Canadian ice hockey player and coach
- Don Walser (1934–2006), American singer-songwriter and musician
- Emma Shannon Walser (1929–2021), Liberian lawyer and jurist
- Ferdinand Walser (1848–1934), Liechtenstein politician
- Frank Walser (1924–1996), American builder
- Franziska Walser (born 1950), German actor; daughter of Martin Walser
- George Walser (1834–1910), American lawyer and politician
- Helmut Walser Smith (born 1962), German history professor
- Hugo Walser (1940–2005), Liechtensteiner runner
- Hugo Walser (field hockey) (fl.1948), Swiss field hockey player
- Jenny Walser (born 1995), English actress
- Karl Walser (1877–1943), Swiss painter, stage designer, illustrator, and muralist
- Martin Walser (1927–2023), German writer
- Robert Walser, (1878–1956), German-speaking Swiss writer
- Robert Walser (musicologist), American musicologist, writer, and educator
- Samuel Walser (born 1992), Swiss ice hockey player
- Ulrich and Anton Walser (fl.c. late 19th-cent.), Swiss-born American builders
- Zeb V. Walser (1866–1940), American attorney and politician

== See also ==
- Walter (disambiguation)
- Waltzer (surname)
- Walzer (surname)
- Wälzer (surname)
