= Opus III =

Opus III or Opus 3 may refer to:

- Opus 3 of various composers, see Op. 3 (disambiguation)
- Opus-3 Lithuanian National Radio and Television
- Opus 3 Artists
- Opus III (band) 1992–1994

== See also ==
- Opus 111, French classical record label
