= Johann Baptist Strauss =

Johann Baptist Strauss may refer to:

- Johann Strauss I (1804–1849), Austrian Romantic composer
- Johann Strauss II (1825–1899), his son, Austrian composer of light music
