= Military march =

Military march may refer to:

- March (music), a musical genre
- Military step, a regular, ordered and synchronized walking of military formations
- "Military march" (anthem), the national anthem of the Belarusian Democratic Republic that existed from 1918 to 1919
- Military march (Bruckner), composed by Anton Bruckner in 1865
- Three Marches Militaires (Schubert), composed by Franz Schubert
