= Op. 3 =

In music, Op. 3 stands for Opus number 3. Compositions that are assigned this number include:

- Bach – Organ concerto
- Beethoven – String Trio
- Berg – String Quartet
- Britten – A Boy Was Born
- Chopin – Introduction and Polonaise brillante
- Dvořák – Symphony No. 1 in C minor "The Bells of Zlonice"
- Gottschalk – La Savane
- Handel – Concerti Grossi, Op. 3
- Haydn – String Quartets, Op. 3
- Kreisler – Tambourin Chinois
- Mendelssohn – Piano Quartet No. 3
- Myaskovsky – Symphony No. 1
- Rachmaninoff – Morceaux de fantaisie
- Rachmaninoff – Prelude in C-sharp minor
- Rautavaara – A Requiem in Our Time
- Schumann – Etudes After Paganini Caprices
- Sibelius – "Arioso", art song (1911)
- Stamitz – Symphony in D major, Op. 3, No. 2
- Strauss – Wiener Carneval
- Stravinsky – Scherzo fantastique
- Tchaikovsky – The Voyevoda
- Vivaldi – L'estro armonico
- Zemlinsky – Clarinet Trio
