= Béla Kéler =

Composer and conductor from the Kingdom of Hungary (1820–1882)

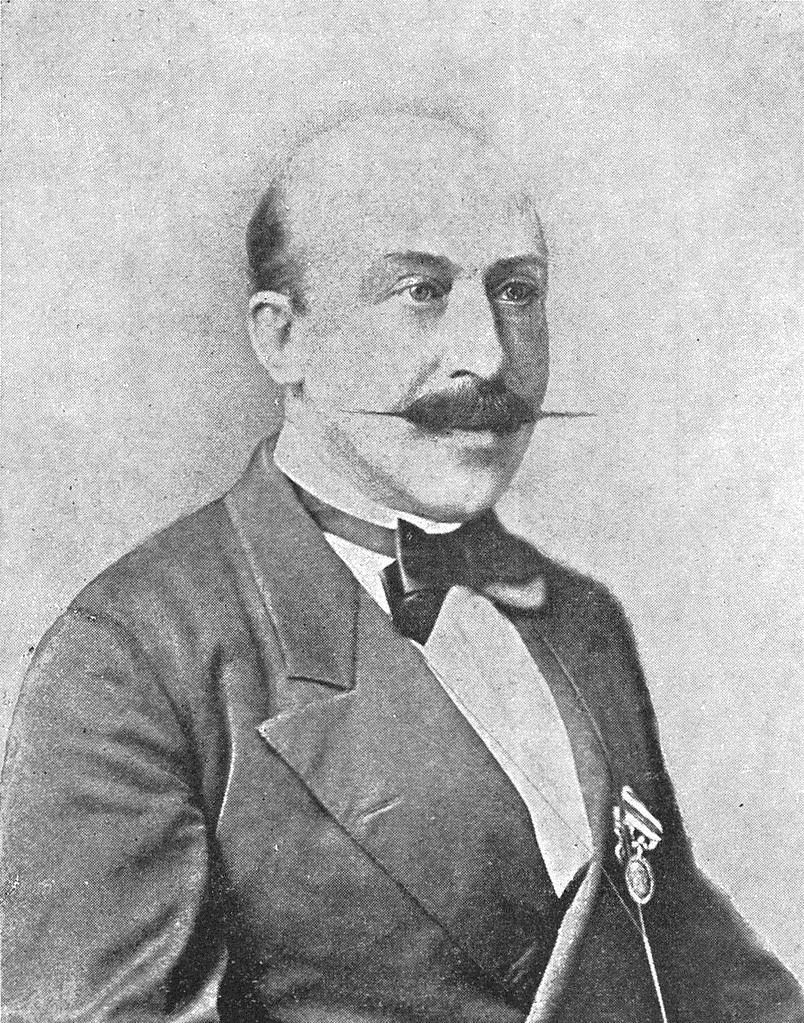
Béla Kéler

Béla Kéler (13 February 1820 – 20 November 1882) was a Hungarian composer of romantic music period and orchestral conductor. Béla Kéler was born as Albert Paul Keler (Adalbert Paul von Keler). He is also known in Hungarian as Kéler Béla. He was born Bártfa, Sáros County, Kingdom of Hungary, Austrian Empire (present-day Bardejov, Slovakia), and died in Wiesbaden, German Empire. He was active in Hungary, Austria and Germany.

== Family ==
Béla Kéler was born in 1820 in Bártfa (German: Bartfeld, present-day Slovak: Bardejov), Kingdom of Hungary, as Albert Paul Keler, but German and Austrian sources also give Adalbert Paul von Keler. He descended from an ethnic German family on his father's side, but was ethnic Hungarian on his mother's side.

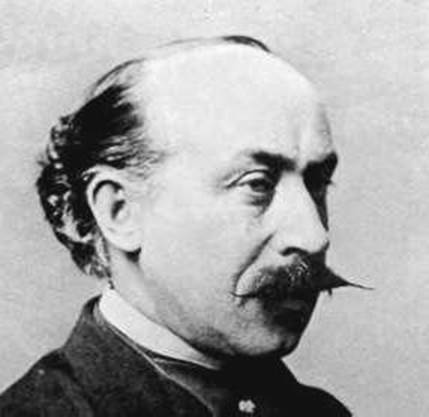
Béla Kéler

His father Stefan Kéler (1781–1849) was a principal magistrate of Bártfa, from an old Bártfa burgher's family. His mother Anna Bóth (1793–1848) was from the Hungarian Both de Botfalva noble family. They raised 13 children. Albert's siblings were Frederika, Stefan, Emilia, Antonia, Matilda, Augusta, Apollonia, Ferdinand, Viktor, Josefina, and Amalia. The household was German speaking; the majority of residents of Bártfa that time were Carpathian Germans.

== Youth ==
Kéler's musical education starts with Franz Schiffer a choirmaster at the Bardejov Basilica of St. Giles, who taught him the basics of the violin and piano. Children from evangelical families in Bardejov, to which Kéler belonged, went to a German school by the evangelical church. Kéler completes his basic education in 1834. In the same year he was confirmed. He continued his studies at the Lutheran lyceum in Levoča (1834–1835) and following this, at the Evangelical College in Prešov and the Debrecen Reformed College (1836–1840).

While studying law and philosophy in Prešov, Béla Kéler led the school orchestra and wrote smaller compositions, however his parents preferred that he would continue in the family legal profession tradition.

The difference between the vision of Béla Kéler and that of his parents led to a situation where, at their wish, he started, on July 1, 1840, one year of practical training in agriculture at the estate of the Counts Schönborn-Buchheim in Mukačevo. Even while performing hard physical labour, Kéler did not cease to strive for an artistic future. After the end of his one-year engagement in Mukačevo, Kéler left to work at the farms of his brother-in-law Ferdinand Medwey, the husband of his sister Amalia, in Galicia in Beskids. As a result of natural disasters and fires, his brother-in-law Ferdinand lost his property so Kéler lost employment and returned to Bardejov. He spent the summer of 1844 with his parents at their villa in Bardejovské Kúpele. Kéler offered several of his waltzes to the conductor of the local spa orchestra who included them in the colonnade concert program. During the autumn of that year, Kéler moved to Prešov where he was soon able to teach music and perform in the local theater orchestra.

== Career ==
=== 1845–1860 ===
==== Violinist at the Theater an der Wien (1845–1854) ====
After less than a year of engagement in Prešov, Kéler moved to Vienna where the owner-director of the Theater an der Wien, Franz Pokorny (1797–1850), engaged him from August 28, 1845, in the position of a violinist in his orchestra. The still existing theatre got its name from the river Wien which runs underground beside the building. Besides performing as an orchestral violinist, Kéler studied for two years harmony and composition with the Theater an der Wien violoncellist Carl Schlesinger and in 1851–1853, harmony and counterpoint with the pedagogue at the Vienna Conservatory Simon Sechter (1788–1867), among whose students were the composers Franz Schubert and Anton Bruckner. Kéler's nine-year long engagement with the Theater an der Wien orchestra officially ended on May 7, 1854. During this period, his first ten opus numbers were published. The first of these is the composition "Three Hungarian", Op. 1, published by the Vienna publisher Tobias Haslinger in 1846. The pivotal composition for Kéler's further career, especially conducting, became the waltz "The Stars of Hope", Op. 17. Johann Benedict Sommer asked Kéler to send him this waltz for an orchestral performance at Sommer's salons in Berlin. Kéler sent him the waltz in July 1853.

==== Conductor of Sommer's Orchestra in Berlin (1854–1855) ====
A year later, due to the success of his waltz "The Stars of Hope", Op. 17, with the Berlin public, Kéler was engaged by Johann Benedict Sommer for the chief conductor's position in his 36-piece orchestra. Concerts took place almost daily in Sommer's salons which occupied today's railway station on Potsdam Square. Kéler's five-month contract covered the period of May 1 to October 1, 1854. Kéler's Sommer engagement lasted significantly longer than the originally planned five months, actually until the autumn of 1855. Kéler led the Sommer orchestra not only in Berlin, but also in Hamburg, Dresden, Wrocław, Cologne and other concert venues. As part of the eleventh concert of Sommer's orchestra in Hamburg, Kéler introduced the premiere of his extensive vocal-instrumental composition The Carpathians for tenor, male chorus, orchestra, and recital on October 5, 1854. In the autumn of 1855, Kéler parted with the Berlin orchestra and returned to Vienna.

==== Conductor of Lanner orchestra in Vienna (1855–1856) ====
Following the untimely and unexpected death of August Lanner in September 1855, the orchestra found itself without a conductor. Several candidates vied to take over the Lanner orchestra. Finally, two persons were entrusted to lead it. Béla Kéler and its current concert master Jakob Haag (1823–1874). Both conducted most of the concerts during the 1855–1856 season. From today's knowledge, it is not possible to determine, whether Kéler's seven-month engagement in Vienna was agreed to beforehand as a short-term fill-in until the end of the concert season after the sudden death of August Lanner, or it was ended after Kéler was made an offer from Count Mazzuchelli for the post of a bandmaster with his military regiment.

==== Bandmaster of the Count Mazzuchelli Regiment (1856–1860) ====
In Vienna on August 1, 1856, Béla Kéler was appointed to the post of a bandmaster of the Count Alois Mazzuchelli (1776–1868) 10th Infantry Regiment orchestra. This appointment presented a major challenge to Kéler. He had to be artistically creative under demanding military conditions, despite the fact that the regiment often had to move around. It moved successively through Vienna, Debrecen, Budapest, Belgrade, Sibiu, Portogruaro, Valvasone, Brasov and other cities. Kéler's orchestra, which apart from the wind instruments included string instruments in order to perform not only at military events, but at individual promenade concerts, where marches were supplemented by dance compositions, transcriptions of operatic works and medleys of popular melodies, so called potpourris. The proof of the quality of Kéler's work with orchestra is the winning of "Mazzuchelli March", Op. 22, in a competition organized by the Austrian military bandmaster Andreas Leonhardt in 1857. The march, which was dedicated to Count Mazzuchelli, was for almost the whole 20th century wrongly credited to the Austrian composer Anton Bruckner (1824–1896). As late as 1977, the march under the title of "Apollo March" appeared on the list of Bruckner's works with the number 115. The error was probably caused by the fact that Kéler's "Mazzuchelli March" is similar in its form and instrumentation to Bruckner's Military March in E-flat major, WAB 116, it seems that Bruckner was inspired by the "Mazzuchelli March". In March 1857, Kéler appeared with his orchestra at the Debrecen theater, housed in the granary belonging to town counsellor Gábor Nánássy. With a short exception at the beginning of 1859, when the regiment was in Belgrade, Kéler's regular concerts in Budapest took place until the end of April 1859. In May 1859, Kéler as military bandmaster, moved with the regiment for manoeuvres by the Austrian army to Italy, where the so-called Second Italian War of Independence was being fought between the Austrian and Sardinian-French armies. After the conclusion of this battle, which saw the loss of the Austrian army in the Battle of Solferino at the hands of the Sardinian-French armies, his service with the military orchestra brought Kéler to Sibiu in Romania. The work for the military regiment was physically very demanding for Kéler, and likely had a negative impact on his later serious health problems. Already during his service, he had undergone several cures in the Romanian spa town of Oradea. In 1860, he requested to be released for health reasons. This was accepted, and he ended his service in the army on September 30, 1860.

=== 1861–1872 ===
==== Conductor of own orchestra in Budapest (1861–1862) ====
Kéler spent the second half of 1860 and the first months of 1861 in Bardejovské Kúpele, in Prešov and at other locations in his native region. From here, he headed for Budapest where, together with Josef Dubez (1824–1900), who was active until 1860 as a bandmaster of the 4th Infantry Regiment Hoch-und Deutschmeister, founded an approximately 30-member orchestra. Kéler headed this from March 1861 to the end of 1862. Towards the end of 1862, an offer was received by Kéler from the Duke of Nassau for a long-term engagement as an orchestral conductor for his regiment in Wiesbaden. Since Kéler preferred permanent engagements to uncertain freelance work without a regular income, he decided to accept the offer and to discontinue his work at the head of his own orchestra. On December 21, 1862, the last Kéler concert took place in Budapest.

==== Music director of the 2nd Regiment of the Duke of Nassau (1863–1866) ====
In January 1863, Béla Kéler took over the post of the court bandmaster of the 45-member orchestra of the 2nd Duke of Nassau Regiment in Wiesbaden (1817–1905) after Benedict Stadtfeld (1788–1878) who retired at the age of 75. The regimental commander was Bruno Neidhardt von Gneisenau (1811–1889). Kéler conducted the major part of the concerts by the orchestra of the 2nd Regiment in the spa building in Wiesbaden, since a permanent spa orchestra did not yet exist at that time. The programme of Kéler's concerts consisted not only of his own compositions and dance pieces by some of his contemporaries, but also symphonic creations by Haydn, Mozart, Beethoven, Mendelssohn-Bartholdy, Schubert, Berlioz, and others. An inseparable part of the concerts were the overtures by the romantic composers – Verdi, Rossini, Gounod, Donizetti, Weber, and others. In 1864, Kéler conducted 317 concerts. His overall annual income increased to around 3 000 gulden. Kéler remained in the position of bandmaster of the 2nd Regiment Orchestra until November 1866, when the Duchy of Nassau was annexed by Prussia after the defeat of the Austrian Empire in the Prussian-Austrian War. Duke Adolf was removed from the throne and Nassau military units were incorporated into the Prussian army.

==== Mainz, Bardejov and Amsterdam (1867–1868) ====
In the years 1867 to 1870, Kéler did not have any permanent engagements. He lived in rental accommodation in Wiesbaden, first at Michelsberg 23, and later at Marktstraße. In January and February 1867, Kéler conducted the Wiesbaden spa orchestra at carnival concerts in the historical Frankfurter Hof Hall in Mainz. Every Sunday and during holidays, he performed at concerts in the Wiesbaden Saalbau Schirmer.

In July and August 1868, Kéler was staying in his native Bardejov region. On August 4, he organized, in cooperation with Count Ferencz Szirmay (1838–1871), a benefit concert in Bardejovské Kúpele in the aid of victims of a June fire in Bardejov, during which tens of houses burned down.

In the middle of August 1868, Kéler returned to Wiesbaden, where on August 28 he conducted for the first time his new and what became his best-known waltz "On the Beautiful Rhine I Think of You", Op. 83, which has been compared to Johann Strauss's waltz "On the Beautiful Blue Danube", Op. 314.

In December 1868, Kéler obtained an engagement for four concerts in Amsterdam from Johann Eduard Stumpff (1813–1879). At the first three concerts at the Frascati Theater, Kéler conducted exclusively his own compositions. At the fourth concert in the Parkzaal concert hall, which is considered the predecessor of today's Concertgebouw, he shared in the leading of the orchestra with the chief conductor Willem Stumpff (1826–1912).

==== Conductor of the Wiesbaden spa orchestra (1870–1872) ====
Kéler, after his seven-month stay in hospital in Würzburg returned to Wiesbaden on May 4, 1870. As a result of the military regiment being moved to French battlefields, the spa was left without a musical body, since the members also played in the spa orchestra. Because the bandmaster Josef Kaschte (1821–1878) was also leaving, Béla Kéler accepted an offer by the spa society board to organize and lead a new orchestra as of July 25, 1870. In the winter months between 1870/1871, the promenade concerts took place in Hotel Victoria. At the beginning of April 1871, the concerts returned to the Wiesbaden spa building. Kéler left his post at the head of the spa orchestra in Wiesbaden on December 31, 1872. It probably had to do with a new law in Prussia, which ordered the closure of all casinos by the end of that year at latest, and which brought with it an expectation of dramatic losses of visitors to the spa.

=== 1873–1878 ===
==== Looking for new engagements (1873) ====
Kéler then worked as a freelance guest conductor, which allowed him to perform more often abroad, and by this, he became better known outside the German and Austria-Hungarian territories. Kéler's permanent residency remained in Wiesbaden, where he rented an apartment. In the spring, Kéler stayed in Berlin, and at the beginning of summer went to London, where he most likely held talks about his tour in September of the following year. To this, he modified his actual composing. Several links in the database of American periodicals from 1862 to 1882 testify to the fact that Kéler's music was played and popular in the United States. In April 1873, the American press published information about Kéler's interest to undertake a concert tour of the USA.

==== Penultimate visit to native Bardejov (1873) ====
In July 1873, after five years, Kéler visited his Bardejov home. Just as during every visit to Bardejov, he lived in his house in Bardejovské Kúpele, which he inherited in 1850 after the death of his father Stephan. The house was demolished to make room for a construction of a new spa in the second half of the 20th century. Since Kéler mostly worked in the western part of Europe, he rented out the house for the major part of the year to spa visitors. Its overseer was Kéler's sister Emilie Vandrák, second wife of Andrej Vandrák, a long-time director of the Evangelical Collegium in Prešov. Emilie, among her other duties, was responsible for setting the rent, keeping accounting books, purchasing furniture for the house interior, changing of the roof, and roofing of a well in the garden. In the garden of Béla Kéler's house, there was a mineral spring which ran into his well. Annually, there were hundreds of thousands of clay bottles filled with water from Kéler's spring, which were subsequently exported to customers. This spring was, together with the Main, Medical, Colonnade, and Elisabeth springs considered among the best-known springs in Bardejovské Kúpele even at the time when the villa was owned by Kéler's father Stephan. Even during his stay at home, Kéler was artistically active. In July 1873 he appeared as a violinist with a piano accompaniment at a charity concert near Bardejov, in the spa Starý Smokovec, where he performed his own compositions. The proceeds of 67 gulden were donated to the improvement of the Tatra roads. Kéler returned from his homeland to Wiesbaden on October 22, 1873.

==== London and Manchester (1874–1875) ====
In Wiesbaden during the first half of 1874, Kéler was preparing for his English tour. In September 1874, Kéler was invited for four weeks to London, where from September 5 until October 2, he directed with other conductors a hundred-member orchestra at the Royal Opera House Covent Garden in a concert series called Grand Instrumental and Vocal Promenade Concerts. The orchestra comprised members of the orchestras of the Royal Italian Opera, Covent Garden, Theatre Royal Drury Lane and Royal Philharmonic Society. During his London engagement, Kéler learned that King Oskar II of Sweden, had bestowed a gold medal Litteris et Artibus upon him for his contributions to science and arts. On the front face of the medal there was a portrait of the ruling Swedish king, while the back face bears the Latin sign Litteris et Artibus, in translation to literature and arts. The medal was made of silver, its surface gilded, and it still is being awarded to this day. It was rarely bestowed on artists without Swedish citizenship.

Following the end of Kéler's engagement in London he received an offer to perform three concerts in Manchester, at the great hall of the Free Trade Hall on Peter Street, which served as the main Manchester concert hall until 1996. Kéler performed concerts on October 17, 19, and 24 as part of Mr. de Jong's Popular Concerts series. Kéler took turns with de Jong in leading the approximately 60-member orchestra.

Kéler entertained the idea of moving permanently from Wiesbaden to London, especially since his intended overseas engagement in which he has been showing his interest for two years did not materialize. Until the summer of 1875, Kéler was not able to obtain further engagements, and so he planned to return to Wiesbaden. After the return to Wiesbaden until the end of 1875, Kéler did not find any concert engagement.

==== Berlin's Stadtpark (1876) ====
During the second half of 1875 and the first half of 1876 Kéler primarily composed. Since Kéler was afraid of further deterioration of his health, he left in the middle of July 1876 for a several-week-long wellness stay in Bad Ems. During the stay there, Kéler received an offer for a 14-day engagement in Berlin. Kéler conducted the Berliner Sinfonie-Capelle at six concerts in the Stadtpark from July 30 to August 12. Members of this orchestra subsequently became the basis for the Berlin Philharmonic. Kéler in Berlin, just like in London, was unable to secure the post of a permanent conductor with one of the local orchestras, and so he returned to Wiesbaden during October.

==== Munich English Garden (1877) ====
On April 30, Kéler traveled for a month to London where he held business talks and at the same time visited his acquaintances. He returned to Wiesbaden exactly one month later on May 30. On June 5, after a five days' stay in Wiesbaden, Kéler departed for a summer engagement in Munich. After a longer artistic break, Kéler conducted concerts from June 10 to August 30 in the Englischer Garten. The last farewell concert on August 30, turned out well for Kéler in all respects. He also had great success as a solo violinist. Overall, during the two months, he conducted 86 concerts.

==== Zurich's Tonhalle (1877) ====
On September 7, Kéler departed from Munich to Zurich where he was offered an engagement for three concerts by the Tonhalle-Orchester Zürich, which still exists to this day. Kéler's concerts took place in the so-called Old Tonhalle. Today's Tonhalle has been located since 1895 in another building. The first three Kéler's concerts were held from September 10 to 12. The management of the Tonhalle was so happy with Kéler's skills, that they offered him a fourth, and subsequently a fifth concert. After a deserved success, Kéler planned a short trip to Lucerne before returning to Wiesbaden. We do not know if Kéler followed on his leisure program in Lucerne, since he appeared there on Sunday September 23 at a concert at the Hotel du Lac.

==== Hamburg with George Stadly (1877–1878) ====
At the recommendation of Jacob Cohen, Kéler was engaged by the George Stadly Company for a month-long concert contract in Hamburg. On Thursday October 11, 1877, Kéler departed in the early morning hours for Hamburg. The guest appearance by Béla Kéler at the head of the orchestra of the 2nd infantry regiment number 76 attracted much attention. Due to Kéler's great reception, the one-month engagement was extended by two weeks – to November 29, 1877. Kéler accepted an offer by George Stadly for a further concert series in January 1878. Even though there was a break of more than a month between the two-concert series, Kéler remained during this period in Hamburg.

==== Paris World Fair (1878) ====
At the beginning of May 1878, Kéler received an offer for a concert series in Paris. For that reason, he left Hamburg on May 10 and set out for another artistic engagement to the land of the Gallic rooster. Kéler arrived in Paris in the evening of May 17. For the purposes of the 10th World's Fair, which took place in Paris from May 1 to October 31, an 80-member orchestra was organized and led by Jean-Baptiste Arban (1825–1889) in the Orangerie building, together with other renowned conductors. Kéler conducted a total of 30 concerts in the electrically illuminated hall between May 24 and June 21 and believed that their success would lead to securing further engagements. During the concert string, Kéler's state of health gradually worsened. Since June 27, six days after the last 30th concert, he was hospitalized at Hospitaller Order of the Brothers of Saint John of God. Kéler's health was improving from the beginning of July, and he began to feel relatively well. In the evening on August 3, Kéler left the Paris hospital and a day later, on Sunday August 4 arrived in Wiesbaden.

==== Tivolis in Hannover and Copenhagen (1878) ====
Kéler did not stay long in Wiesbaden, already on August 8 he left on a tour to Copenhagen, where the artistic director of the local entertainment park Tivoli, Bernhard Olsen, had made Kéler an offer shortly before his departure from Paris. However, Kéler's first stop was Hannover, where he conducted the orchestra of the 1st Hannover Infantry Regiment no. 74 from August 11 to 15 in the newly opened Karl Röpke Tivoli concert garden in the center of Hannover. Only after that, Kéler headed from Hannover via Hamburg, Kiel and Korsør to Copenhagen.

Kéler's concerts in Copenhagen were held between August 24 and September 11 in Tivoli, which still exists to this day and at the same time is the second oldest entertainment park in the world. At the concerts, jointly appeared the permanent Tivoli orchestra conductor Balduin Dahl (1834–1891).

=== 1879–1882 ===
==== Celebrations of 25 years of conducting career in Wiesbaden (1879) ====
In April, Kéler planned celebrations of the 25th anniversary of his conducting career, the highlight was to be a concert on May 7 in the spa building in Wiesbaden. Kéler's jubilee concert was connected with great honours. The Viennese press highlighted the high level and program quality of the jubilee concert. Kéler received many congratulatory letters, telegrams, wreaths and flowers. Kéler valued a lot a congratulatory letter from his brother-in-law Andrej Vandrák in Prešov, to whom he assigned a major part in his artistic development. Kéler was fully satisfied with profession of a creative artist, and he thanked his fate that he became a composer well known in the whole world. At the same time, he observed that results in artistic profession usually come in mature age of a person-artist. "I praise my fate that it allowed me to live this day with the knowledge that I am a creative artist and I have reached so much, that the greater part of the musical world in both hemispheres, is noticing me and my composing work. However, may the profession of a creative artist be beautiful, the road to the goal is at the same time far and thorny, and most of the time you reach it only when your hair is turning grey." (Kéler, 1879)

==== Hamburg at Bernhard Pollini (1879) ====
Kéler's work obligations did not allow him to enjoy the rest of his celebrations, and already on May 9, he left for three concerts in Hannover which were held from May 11 to 13 at the local entertainment center Tivoli where he had already performed at concerts the previous year. On Saturday May 17, Kéler arrived in Hamburg for a three-month engagement – from June 1 to September 1 in the Elbpavillon Garden, where he was invited by the director of the Altona City Theater and at the same time of Hamburg State Opera Bernhard Pollini (1838–1897). On the site of the Elbe Pavilion, which was demolished in 1901, a memorial to Otto von Bismarck was built.

Kéler: "Erinnerung an Bartfeld"
MIDI-based rendition

Brahms: Hungarian Dance No. 5
Played by Arthur Nikisch, recorded 1906 on a Welte-Mignon reproducing piano

In September 1879, Kéler provided a statement to a Hamburg newspaper regarding the situation when listeners at the concerts in the Elbpavillon were often surprised by Kéler's authorship of the csárdás "Erinnerung an Bartfeld" (Memory of Bardejov), which was mistakenly being assigned to Johannes Brahms.

I have noticed with surprise, that whenever I have performed my Hungarian dance Memory of Bardejov, a question arose as to how my name had appeared under the composition, since people generally presume that the composer of this dance is Johannes Brahms. To stand up to this misbelief, which is widely spread throughout the musical world, and in order to protect my copyright, I am forced to declare that I composed this Hungarian dance in 1858 and also first performed it at that time in Debrecen. In the same year, the dance was published as my piano composition opus 31 by the musical publishing house of Ròzsavölgyi & Co. Sometime around the beginning of 1870, i.e., about 12 years later, Mr. Brahms arranged ten different Hungarian dances, among them, as no. 5, also my above-mentioned dance, for a four-handed piano. Although the accolades which Mr. Brahms has received for the arrangements of these Hungarian dances have been recognized in the musical world for a long time, and I, as a Hungarian, appreciate them and value them that much more, it is also necessary to think of the composer of the original melodies according to the old Latin saying: 'Let justice be done, though the world perishes'. Béla Kéler, Hamburg, August 1879 (Die Epoche, 1879)

==== Dresden, Halle and Leipzig (1879) ====
After the concert series in Hamburg, Kéler followed up during the first half of November with a concert tour with the 2nd Infantry Regiment of the Emperor Wilhelm I in Dresden at which, in the first of three concert parts, also appeared the bandmaster of this regiment, later a chief conductor of the Dresden Philharmonic Friedrich August Trenkler (1836–1910). Following this, Kéler conducted in Halle and at the end of November, in Leipzig. Kéler performed with his 46-member orchestra in Schützenhaus, which burned down two years later. On December 13, Kéler, after more than seven months, returned to Wiesbaden.

==== Last time in Bardejov (1880) ====
In March, Kéler was planning the schedule of his trip from Wiesbaden via Vienna, Budapest and Prešov to Bardejov. In May 1880, Kéler, after seven years and for the last time, arrived to visit his homeland. From the Šariš region, Kéler headed for Wrocław on August 16, where he conducted 20 concerts in the Liebich Theatre. He returned to Wiesbaden on September 25.

==== Berlin Kroll Opera House and in Wrocław (1881) ====
For the entire summer season 1881, that is from May to the end of September, Kéler was approached by the owner of the Kroll Opera House, Jakob Engel, regarding guest appearance in Berlin. In the second half of August, he got an offer for an engagement in Polish Wrocław. Kéler strived to have the concerts in Berlin and Wrocław follow each other. On May 5, Kéler traveled from Wiesbaden to Berlin for concerts which were held from May 8 to August 15. The no more existing Kroll Opera House was located during 1844–1951 in the vicinity of the Brandenburg Gate on today's Berlin Platz der Republik, at that time Königsplatz. Kéler, however, still departed for Wrocław after completing his commitments in Berlin, where he conducted his own full-evening concerts. In contrast to his income at Berlin's Kroll, where he had a fixed salary, in Wrocław, he was paid a share of profit of the whole series. Since the weather was often bad, Kéler's income was significantly lower in comparison with his engagement of the previous year. On September 4, he ended his performances here.

==== Last concerts in Zurich, Frankfurt and Cologne (1882) ====
At the beginning of 1882, Kéler was preparing several of his works for publishing, but at the same time he was feeling a lack of inspiration for composing. He would have liked to return to the conductor's desk. At the end of August, Kéler again stepped up on the conductor's rostrum. From August 22 to 28, he conducted 7 concerts in Zurich. From there, he traveled to Frankfurt am Main where he appeared at a charitable concert at the local ZOO. Although Kéler felt strong pain, he led an orchestra of the Sharpshooter's Regiment no. 40 in Cologne from October 26 to 29. On Sunday October 29, 1882, Béla Kéler conducted here his last concert.

== Death ==
From November 12, the seriously ill Kéler lay in the city hospital in Wiesbaden. He was fully conscious until the last moment, and with the greatest care, he authorized his close friend and at the same time his legal attorney to make the arrangements of all the details of his funeral and the settlement of his property. Béla Kéler died in Wiesbaden on November 20, 1882.

== Compositions ==
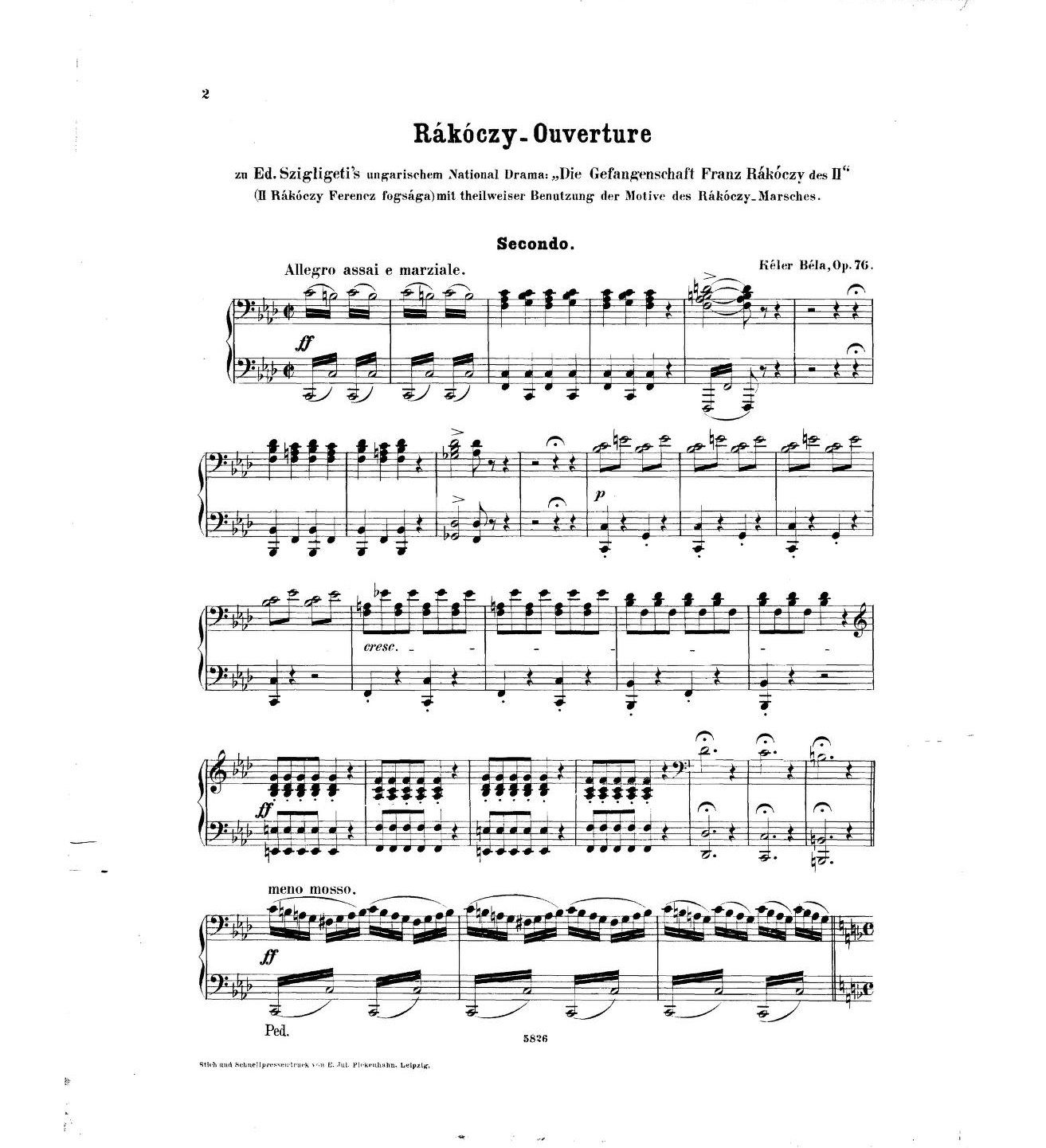
First page of Béla Kéler's Rákóczi Overture

His best known piece "Erinnerung an Bartfeld" is written on the melodies of typical local folk songs of Šariš. This piece was (partly) mistakenly rewritten by Johannes Brahms as Hungarian Dance No. 5 because Brahms thought it was a folk song, not an original work. Anton Bruckner copied the instrumentation and form (but not the harmony) of Kéler's "Mazzuchelli-Marsch" (also called "Apollo-Marsch") exactly for his own March in E-flat major. (The "Apollo Marsch" was later mistaken for a work of Bruckner's).

Kéler was very popular as a composer of orchestral and dance music, and was looked upon as one of the best of writers of violin solos. His overtures and compositions for small orchestra were long popular in the United States and England.

The Carpathians (1854) is the most serious and at the same time the most extensive work by Béla Kéler. Although the title of the almost an hour-long composition refers to the Carpathian Mountains, the composer was exclusively inspired by the surroundings of the High Tatras, which is near his birthplace. Parts include "Overture", "Introduction", and five musical pictures, in the order "The Lomnica Peak" (Lomnický štít), "The Poprad Lake" (Popradské pleso), "The Iron Hammers", "The Hunt", "The Arrival" and "Life in the Carpathian Spa". It turns out that idyllic music pictures the Carpathians is the first work of program music to be inspired to Slovak natural beauties and everyday life in their surroundings. The digital transcription of the work, in the Petrucci Music Library, was supported using public funding by Slovak Arts Council.

== Heritage ==
Béla Kéler donated all of his works to the city of Bártfa. After the founding of the Šariš Museum in Bártfa in 1903 this collection became part of the permanent exhibition of the museum.

Today, Béla Kéler has his own exhibition screen near the entrance in the City Hall Museum in Bardejov, which is a part of the Šariš Museum. His personal correspondence, manuscripts and printed works, portraits and his memorial tablet are kept and displayed there.
