= Seufzer-Galopp =

Seufzer-Galopp (Sighing), opus 9, is a galop composed by Johann Strauss I. It first appeared in print in December 1828. It was written during the years in which Josef Lanner and Strauss for the moment competed with each other with an ensemble of a handful of musicians, each at the head of a small band.
