= Täuberln-Walzer =

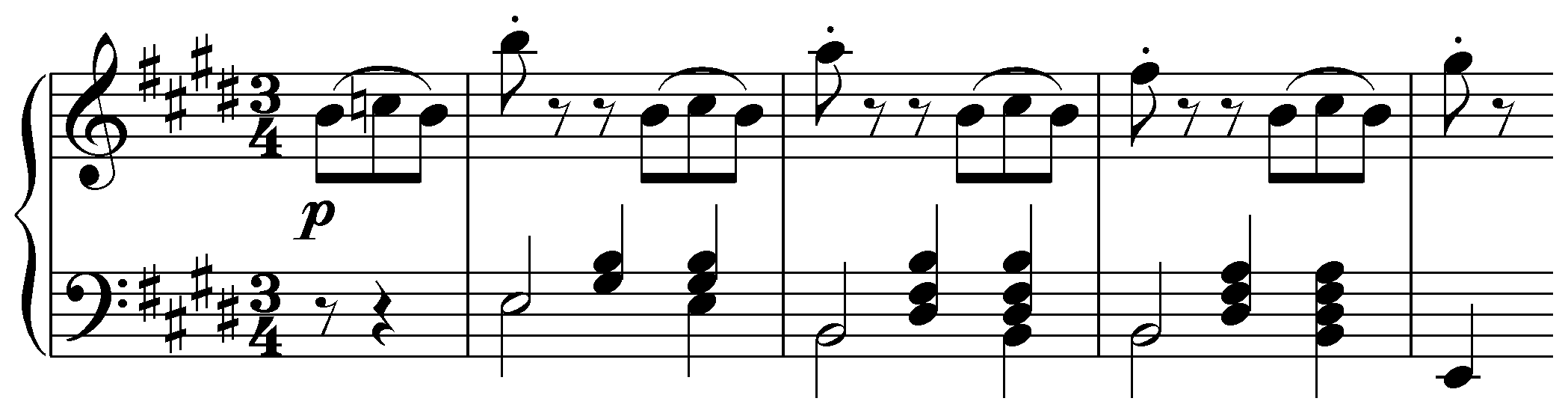
Opening, with the anacrusis repeated each measure, of the second melody from the Täuberln-Walzer (piano reduction)

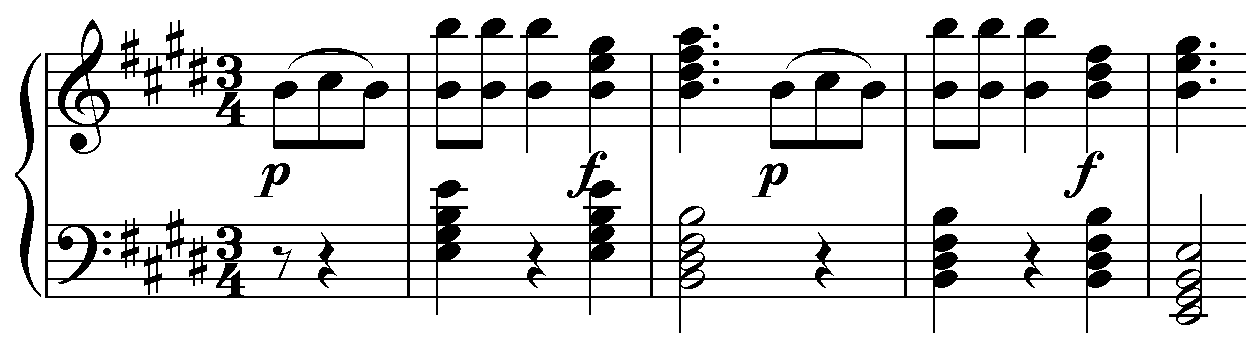
Middle, with the anacrusis repeated every other measure, of the eighth melody

Täuberln-Walzer (Little Doves Waltz), opus 1, is a waltz composed by Johann Strauss I. The work is very simple in form, containing seven melodies without an introduction or coda to the collection as a whole. It debuted during the carnival of 1826, when Strauss introduced his band to the public of Vienna at the Schwan, in the Roßau suburb of Vienna.

Although it is Strauss' first numbered composition, it was not his first work: he had written several other dances under the name of his friend Josef Lanner when the latter was unable to compose due to an illness.
