= Concerto grosso in D major, Op. 6, No. 4 (Corelli) =

Composition by Arcangelo Corelli

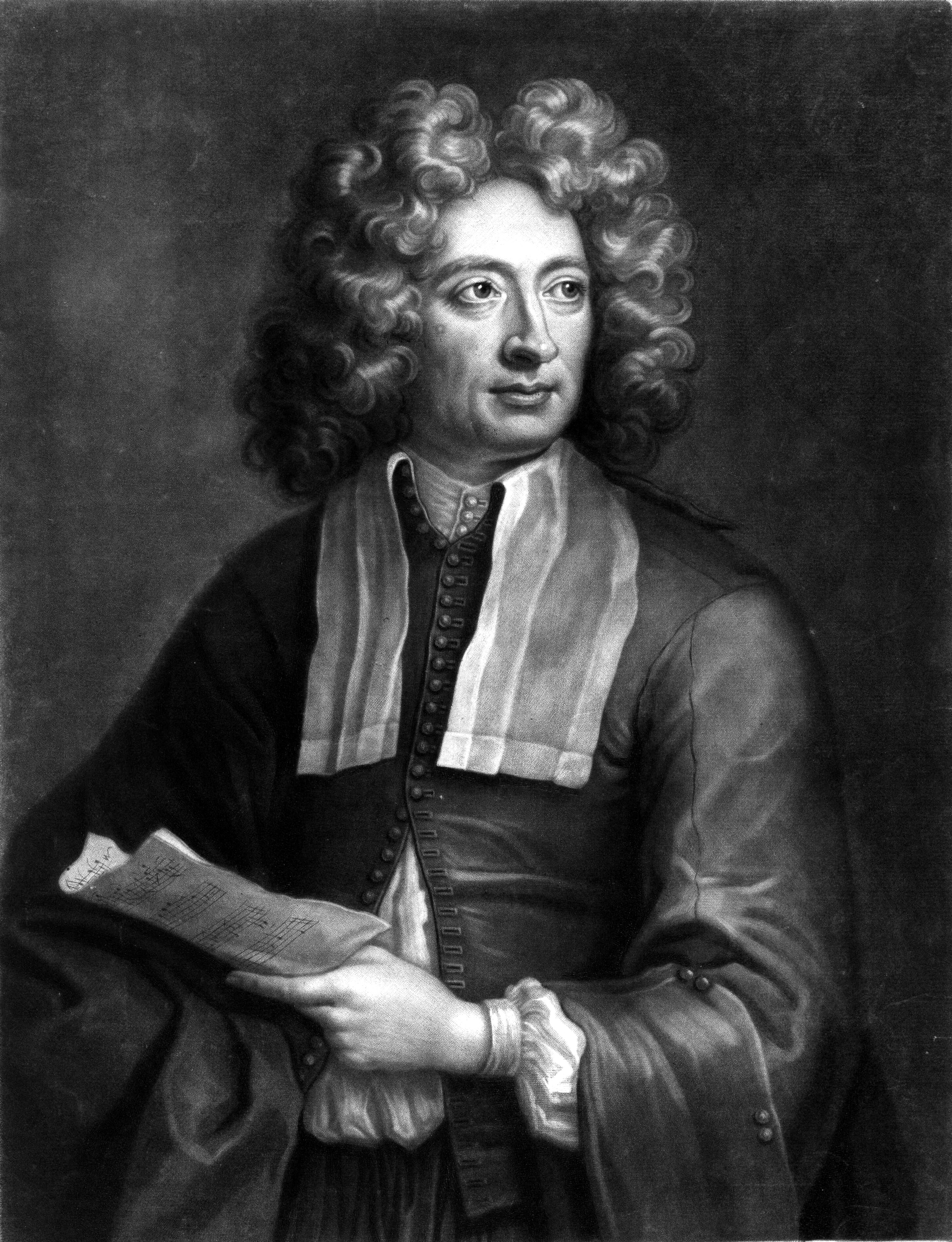
Arcangelo Corelli

Concerto grosso in D major, Op. 6, No. 4, is a composition by Arcangelo Corelli, and was published as the fourth concerto in his Twelve Concerti Grossi, Op. 6 in 1714. This concerto grosso is the second most notable of the twelve, after No. 8, the famous Christmas Concerto. No. 4 is mainly notable for its overall joyfully charged sound, making it a frequently used example when demonstrating Corelli's renowned cantabile style.

== Instrumentation ==
The concerto, like the other eleven Opus 6 concerti, are scored for

- Concertino: 2 violins, violoncello (and optional concertino basso continuo)
- Ripieno: violins I, violins II, violas & basso continuo

== Structure ==
Concerto Grosso in D major Op. 6, No. 4
I. Adagio – Allegro
Performed by the Advent Chamber Orchestra

The concerto is divided into four movements:

1. Adagio - Allegro
2. Adagio
3. Vivace
4. Allegro - Allegro

The concerto lasts approximately 10 minutes depending on performed tempo.

The structure of this concerto is unique compared to the other Op. 6 concerti (which have 5+ short, fragmentary movements based on Italian Baroque dances) because it has 4 well-developed movements, which resembles those of a typical Romantic era symphony: starting with an Allegro followed by an Adagio, a Minuet/Scherzo (in this case, a minuet, as the scherzo had not been yet used in orchestral works at that point) and finally an exciting finale. This sort of structure is common among the sonate da chiesa composed by Corelli, however this one is the one on which future composers based their symphonies and concerti. This structure may not be Corelli's own, however he, along with Antonio Vivaldi, certainly helped bring it into orchestral music.
