= Arioso (Sibelius) =

Song by Jean Sibelius (1911)

- Art song by Jean Sibelius
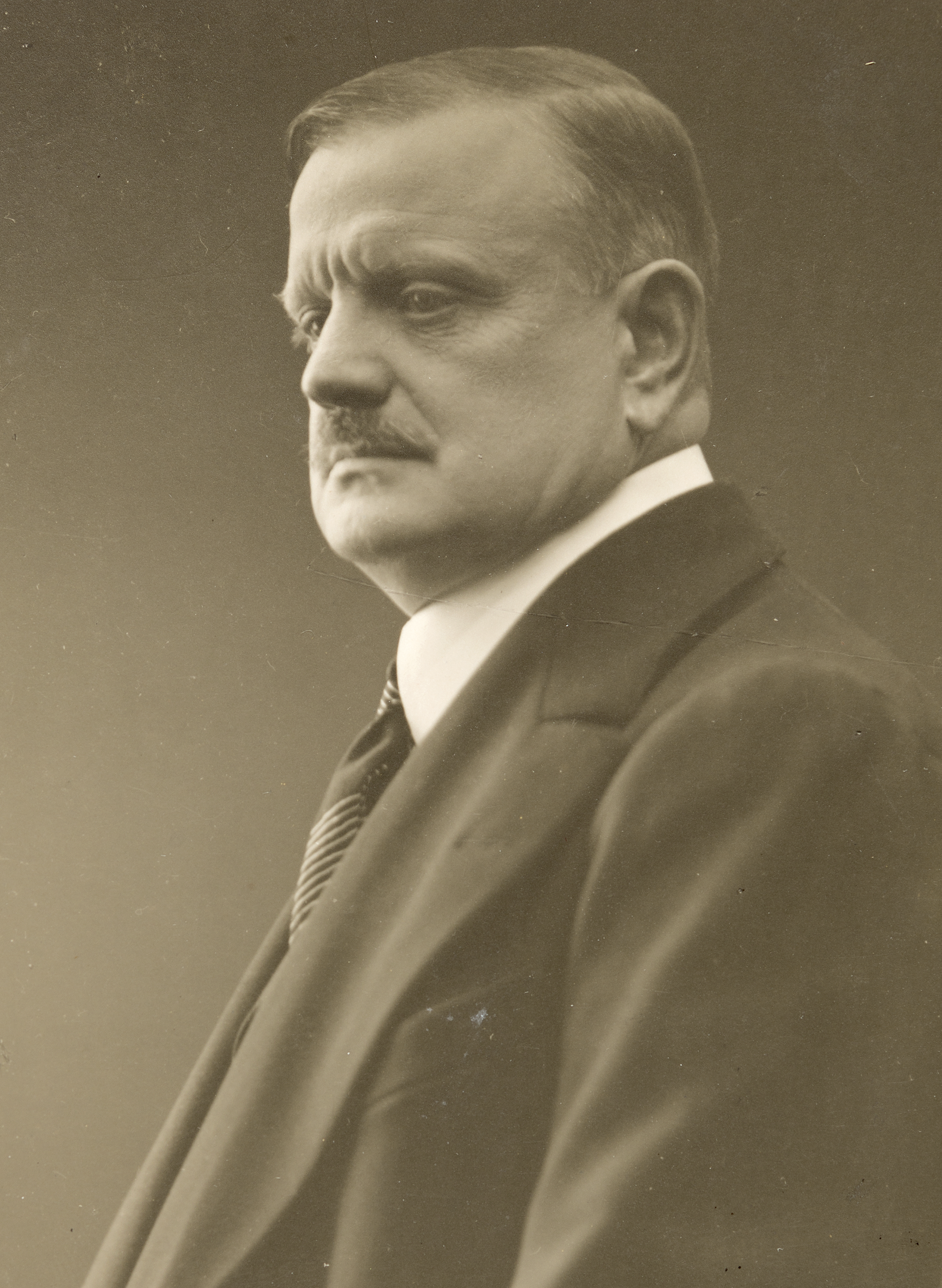
- The composer (c. 1911)
- Opus: 3
- Text: Flickans årstider by Runeberg
- Language: Swedish
- Composed: 1911
- Publisher: Apostol (1913; pf. version); Westerlund (1951; str. version)
- Duration: 4 mins.

Premiere
- Date: 18 September 1913
- Location: Helsinki, Grand Duchy of Finland
- Performers: Ida Ekman (soprano); Karl Ekman (pianist)

"Arioso", Op. 3, is an art song for vocal soloist (typically soprano) and accompaniment written in 1911 by the Finnish composer Jean Sibelius, who appears to have worked simultaneously on two versions of the song: one with strings and the other with piano. The piece, which is a setting of the Swedish-language poem Flickans årstider ("The Maiden's Seasons") by Johan Ludvig Runeberg, Sibelius's favorite poet, premiered on 18 September 1913 in Helsinki with the Finnish soprano Ida Ekman as soloist, accompanied by her husband, Karl Ekman, on piano. The next year in Turku on 30 March, the version of the piece for string orchestra was first performed, again with Ekman as soloist; her husband this time conducted the Turku Orchestral Society.

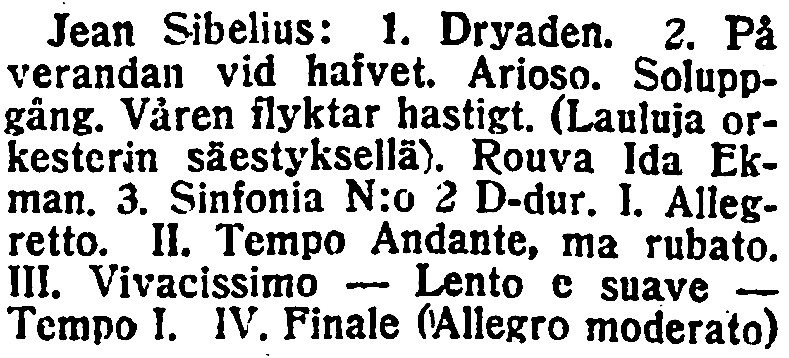
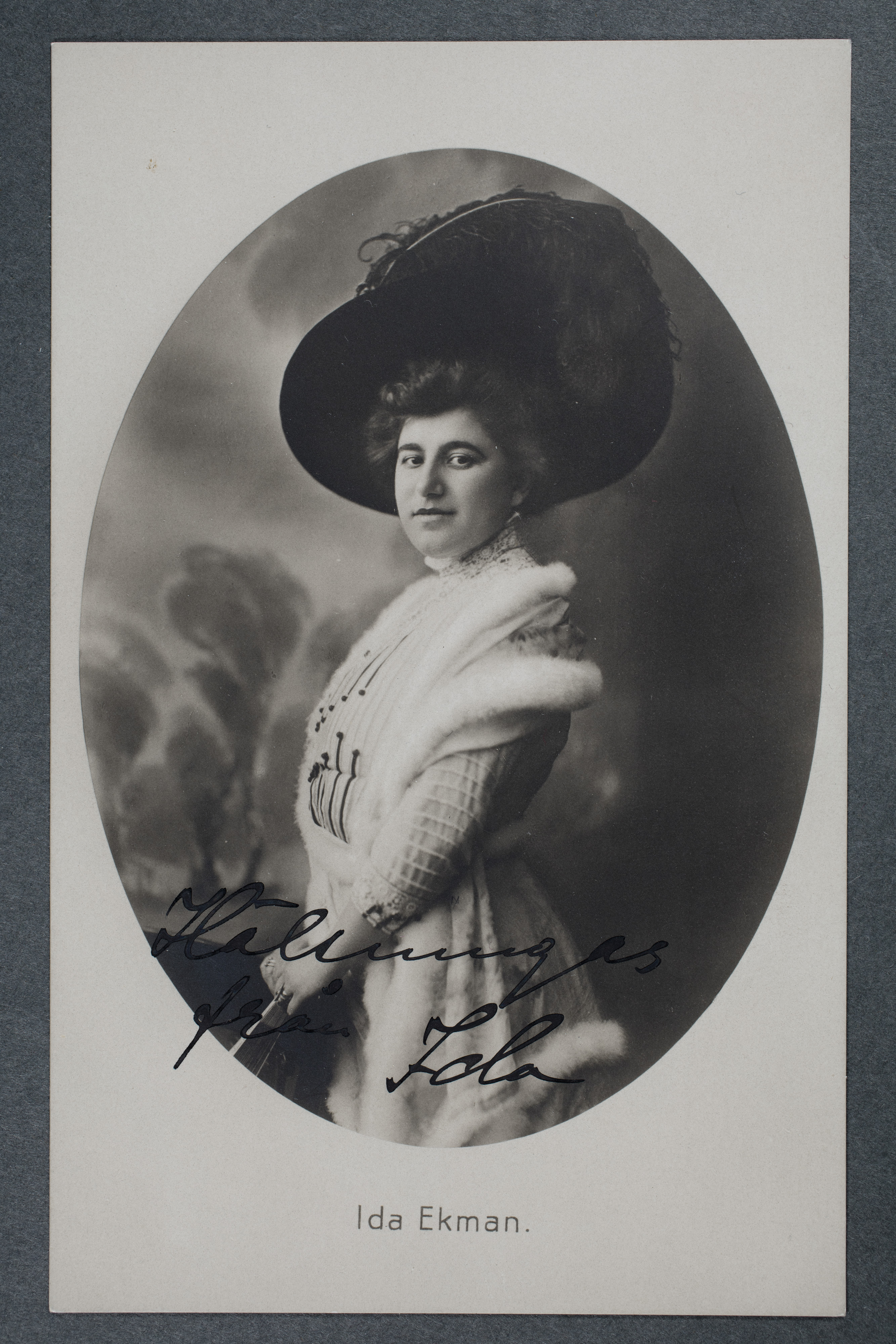
The Finnish soprano Ida Ekman (bottom) premiered both versions of Sibelius's "Arioso"; the version of "Arioso" with strings (ad above) was first performed on 30 March 1914.

Sibelius infamously gave "Arioso" an artificially low opus number to avoid a contractual dispute with his publisher, Breitkopf & Härtel. (Sibelius had sold both versions of "Arioso" to the Helsinki-based publisher A. Apostols Musikhandel, who then tried to sell the rights to Breitkopf & Härtel. When Breitkopf & Härtel protested, Sibelius fibbed, claiming that the song was an older piece that dated to 1890.) Apostle never published the version for strings, and in 1917 his holdings transferred to R. E. Westerlund oy, who subsequently issued the first edition of this version in 1951.

== Music ==
Original Swedish

Flickan gick en vintermorgon
i den rimbeströdda lunden,
såg en vissnad ros och talte:
"Sörj ej, sörj ej, arma blomma,
att din sköna tid förflutit!
Du har levat, du har njutit,
du har ägt din vår och glädje,
innan vinterns köld dig nådde.
Värre öde har mitt hjärta,
har på en gång vår och vinter:
gossens öga är dess vårdag,
och min moders är dess vinter".

English translation (Note: This translation is from the liner notes to the recording by Leif Segerstam, the Helsinki Philharmonic Orchestra, and Soile Isokoski. (Note: L. Segerstam—Ondine (ODE 1080–5) 2006))

One winter morning the girl walked
in the frost-strewn grove,
saw a withered rose and said:
"Do not lament, poor flower,
that your happy time is over!
You have lived, you have delighted,
you have possessed your joyous spring,
before the winter cold reached you.
My heart suffers a worse fate,
it holds spring and winter at once:
my lover's eyes are its spring day,
my mother's are its winter".

== Reception ==
The British musicologist Robert Layton describes "Arioso" as possessing "the grave air of melancholy that distinguishes the elegiac Grieg, and much the same intentness and conviction ... there is a touching directness of utterance about this music and more than a hint of the wide-ranging vocal writing" that Sibelius would master subsequently with the tone poem Luonnotar (Op. 70, 1913). The Sibelius biographer Andrew Barnett, too emphasizes the relation to the Norwegian master: ""Arioso" is a very fine song, with a vein of Nordic melancholy and string textures that have often been compared to Grieg".

== Discography ==
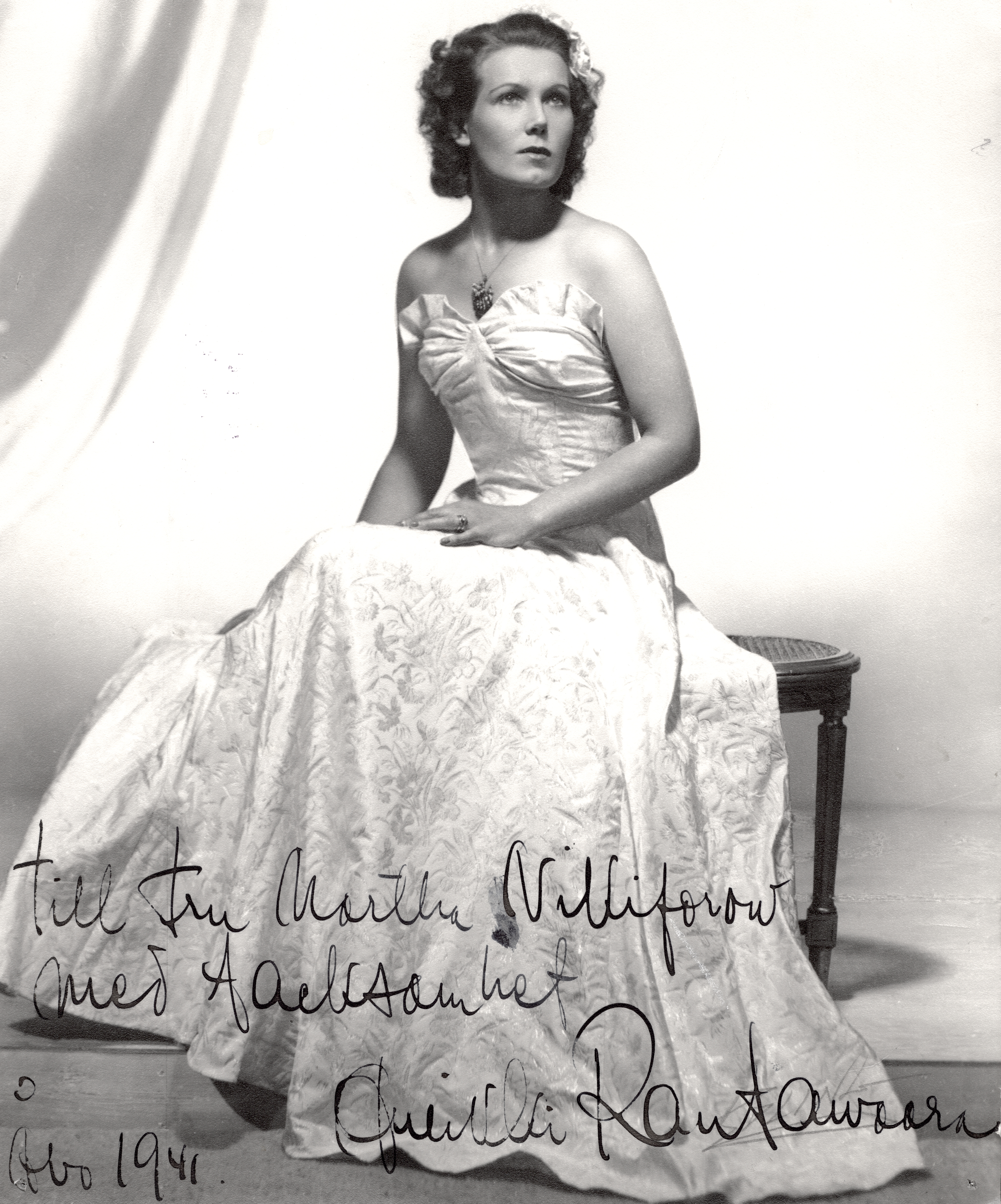
The Finnish soprano Aulikki Rautawaara made the world premiere recording of "Arioso" in 1942.

The Swedish conductor and composer Ture Rangström and the Stockholm Concert Society Orchestra, joined by the Finnish soprano Aulikki Rautawaara, made the world premiere studio recording of "Arioso" in 1942 for Telefunken. The table below lists this and other commercially available recordings of the version with string orchestra:

No.	Soloist	Conductor	Orchestra	Rec. (Note: Refers to the year in which the performers recorded the work; this may not be the same as the year in which the recording was first released to the general public.)	Time	Recording venue	Label	Ref.
1	Aulikki Rautawaara	Ture Rangström	Stockholm Concert Society Orchestra	1942	4:02	?	Telestar	(Note: T. Rangström—Telestar (TR 11148) 1974)
2	Kirsten Flagstad (2)	Øivin Fjeldstad	London Symphony Orchestra	1958	4:06	Kingsway Hall	Decca	(Note: Ø. Fjeldstad—Decca (00028947888239) 2015)
3	MariAnne Häggander	Jorma Panula	Gothenburg Symphony Orchestra	1984	3:48	Gothenburg Concert Hall	BIS	(Note: J. Panula—BIS (CD–270) 1984)
4	Karita Mattila (2)	Sakari Oramo	City of Birmingham Symphony Orchestra	2001	4:24	Symphony Hall, Birmingham	Warner Classics	(Note: S. Oramo—Warner Classics (8573 80243–2) 2004)
5	Soile Isokoski	Leif Segerstam	Helsinki Philharmonic Orchestra	2005	4:38	Finlandia Hall	Ondine	

The version of "Arioso" for piano accompaniment received its first studio recording in 1981, when the Finnish baritone Tom Krause and the American pianist Irwin Gage recorded it for Decca. Predating this, however, is a 1954 radio performance by the Norwegian soprano Kirsten Flagstad and the Norwegian pianist Waldemar Alme, which Simax Classics released in 1996. The table below includes these and other commercially available recordings:

No.	Soloist	Pianist	Rec.	Time	Recording venue	Label	Ref.
1	Kirsten Flagstad (1)	Waldemar Alme	1954	5:03	NRK Studios	Simax Classics	(Note: K. Flagstad—Simax Classics (PSC 1824) 1996)
2	Tom Krause	Irwin Gage	1981	4:13	Kingsway Hall	Decca	(Note: T. Krause—Decca (00028947886150) 2015)
3	Ritva Auvinen	Gustav Djupsjöbacka	1988	3:26	Martinas Culture Hall	Ondine	(Note: R. Auvinen—Ondine (ODE 728–2) 1989)
4	Anne Sofie von Otter	Bengt Forsberg	1989	4:06	Danderyd Grammar School	BIS	(Note: A. von Otter—BIS (CD–457) 1989)
5	Karita Mattila (1)	Ilmo Ranta	1995	4:44	Järvenpää Hall	Ondine	(Note: K. Mattila—Ondine (ODE 856–2) 1995)
6	Essi Luttinen	Kristian Attila	2006	4:04	Mäntyharju Church	Art Centre Salmela	(Note: E. Luttinen—Taidekeskus Salmela (TSCD6) 2006)

== Notes, references, and sources ==
=== Sources ===
- Barnett, Andrew (2007). Sibelius. New Haven, Connecticut: Yale University Press. ISBN 978-0-300-16397-1.
- Dahlström, Fabian [in Swedish] (2003). Jean Sibelius: Thematisch-bibliographisches Verzeichnis seiner Werke [Jean Sibelius: A Thematic Bibliographic Index of His Works] (in German). Wiesbaden: Breitkopf & Härtel. ISBN 3-7651-0333-0.
- Layton, Robert (1993) [1965]. Sibelius. (The Master Musicians Series) (4th ed.). New York: Schirmer Books. ISBN 0028713222.
- Tawaststjerna, Erik (2008c) [1978/1988; trans. 1997]. Sibelius: Volume III, 1914–1957. Translated by Layton, Robert. London: Faber and Faber. ISBN 978-0-571-24774-5.
