= Op. 9 =

In music, Op. 9 stands for Opus number 9. Compositions that are assigned this number include:

- Adams – Chamber Symphony
- Adès – Living Toys
- Bartók – Four Dirges
- Beethoven – String Trios, Op. 9
- Chopin – Nocturnes, Op. 9
- Dohnányi – Symphony No. 1
- Kabalevsky – Piano Concerto No. 1
- Larsson – The Princess of Cyprus (Prinsessan av Cypern), opera in four acts (1936)
- Rachmaninoff – Trio élégiaque No. 2
- Schumann – Carnaval
- Sibelius – En saga, tone poem for orchestra (1892, revised 1902)
- Sor – Introduction and Variations on a Theme by Mozart
- Strauss – Seufzer-Galopp
- Vivaldi – La cetra
