= Gesellschafts-Walzer =

Gesellschafts-Walzer (Association's Waltz), opus 5, is a waltz composed by Johann Strauss I. The work had been composed during the period of Strauss’ service in Josef Lanner’s small orchestra, and premiered at one of the balls at the Zum weissen Schwan (The White Swan) in Rossau, Vienna, after Strauss had been appointed as music director there in the autumn of 1827.
