= August Lanner =

Austrian composer

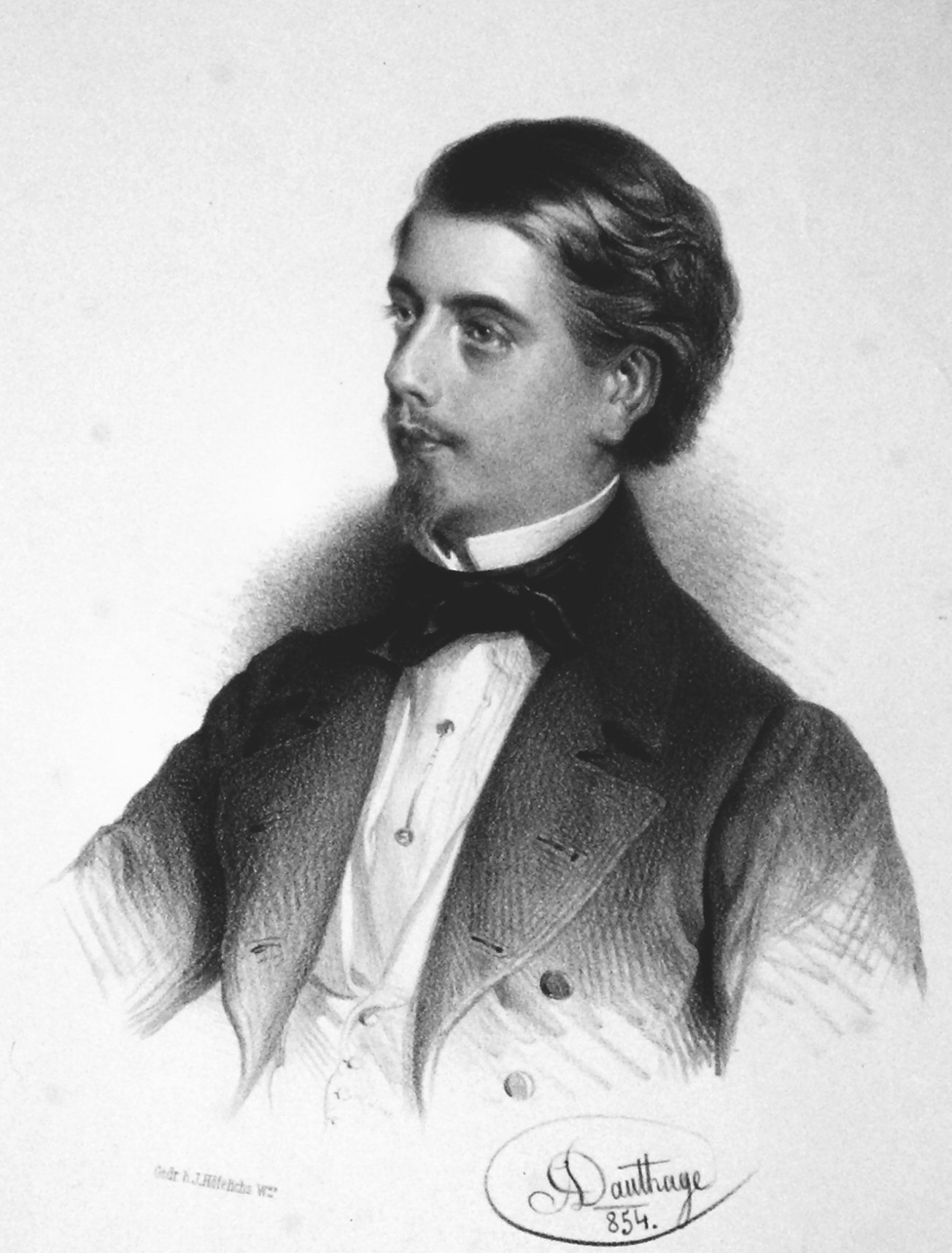

Augustin Lanner (23 January 1835 in Vienna – 27 September 1855 in Vienna), sometimes known as August Lanner, was an Austrian composer, the son of the better-known Joseph Lanner. He was first educated at the St. Anna-Schule but received no music instruction at that time. His earliest music education was first provided by the k.k Kapellmeister Josef Strebinger in harmony and later took instructions in composition with the Viennese composer Joseph Hellmesberger Sr. and also Professor Joseph Mayseder. Among his first efforts at musical composition is a waltz which did not survive obscurity.

After his father's death in 1843, August conducted his father's orchestra when he was only 8 years old at the 'Bräuhausgarten in Fünfhaus' in front of some 2,000 visitors. Making his debut in 1853, he was destined to live only until he was 20 after suffering from a lung illness. In August Lanner's short-lived career, he composed some 30 dance pieces.
