= Johann Strauss I =

Austrian composer (1804–1849)

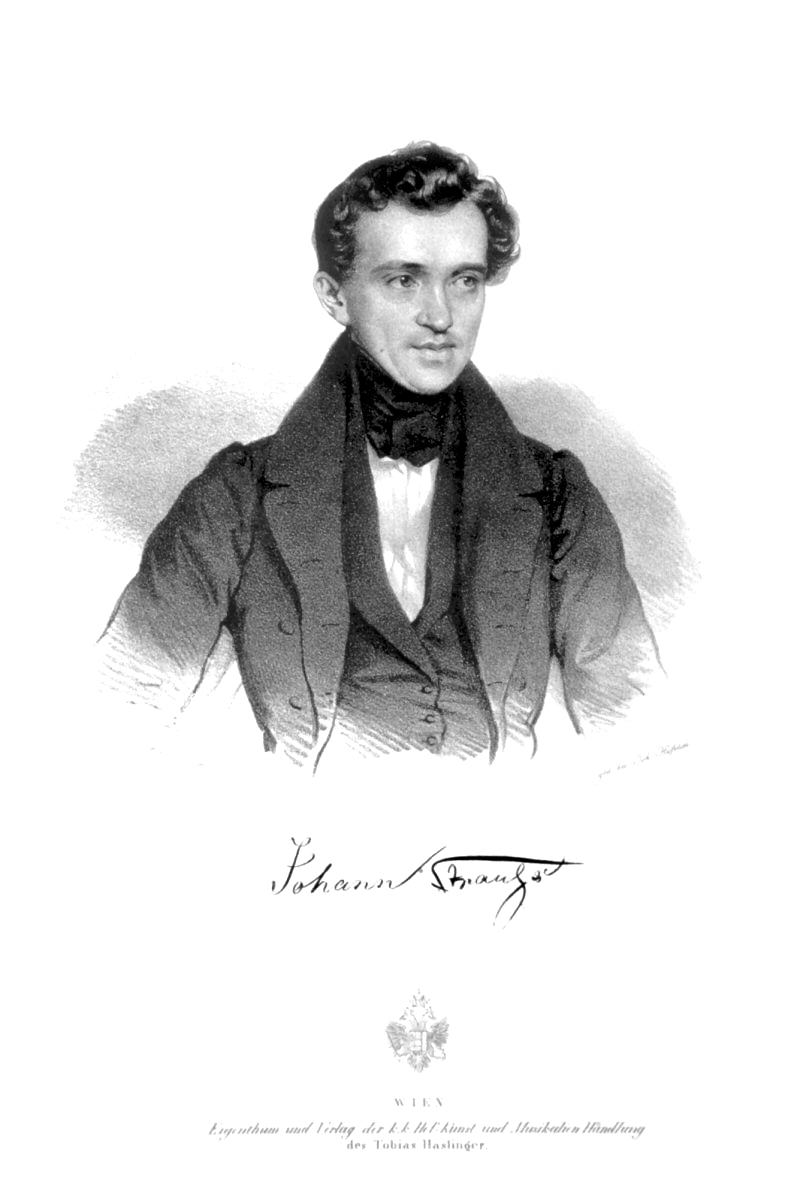
- 1835 lithograph
- Born: Johann Baptist Strauss I 14 March 1804; Leopoldstadt
- Died: 25 September 1849 (aged 45); Vienna
- Burial place: Döblinger Cemetery
- Spouse: M. Anna Streim (m. 1825; div. 1846)
- Partner: Emilie Trampusch I
- Children: 14, including Johann, Josef, and Eduard
- Relatives: Johann Strauss III (grandson); Eduard Strauss II (great-grandson); Julius Epstein (adoptive great-grandson)

Johann Baptist Strauss I (/straʊs/; German: [ˈjoːhan bapˈtɪst ˈʃtʁaʊs]; 14 March 1804 – 25 September 1849), also known as Johann Strauss Sr., the Elder or the Father (German: Johann Strauß Vater), was an Austrian composer of the Romantic Period. He was famous for his light music, namely waltzes, polkas, and galops, which he popularized alongside Joseph Lanner, thereby setting the foundations for his sons—Johann II, Josef and Eduard—to carry on his musical dynasty. He is best known for his composition of the Radetzky March (named after Joseph Radetzky von Radetz).

== Life and work ==
Radetzky March
Strauss' most famous work, "Radetzky March", arranged for the United States Marine Band

Johann Strauss was born in Leopoldstadt (now in Vienna). Strauss's parents, Franz Borgias Strauss and Barbara Dollmann, were innkeepers (Zum heiligen Florian). He was born a Roman Catholic. Strauss had a Jewish grandfather, Johann Michael Strauss N, who converted to Catholicism.

Strauss' mother died of "creeping fever" when he was seven and five years later his father drowned, possibly as a result of suicide, in the Danube river. Strauss' guardian, the tailor Anton Müller, placed him as an apprentice to the bookbinder, Johann Lichtscheidl; Strauss took lessons in the violin and viola in addition to fulfilling his apprenticeship. Contrary to a story later told by his son Johann Strauss II, Strauss successfully completed his bookbinder apprenticeship in 1822. He also studied music with Johann Polischansky during his apprenticeship and eventually managed to secure a place in a local orchestra, headed by Michael Pamer. Strauss left the orchestra to join a popular string quartet known as the Lanner Quartet, formed by his future rivals Joseph Lanner and the Drahanek brothers, Karl and Johann. This string quartet playing Viennese waltzes and rustic German dances expanded into a small string orchestra in 1824.

Strauss became deputy conductor of the orchestra to assist Lanner in commissions after it became so popular during the Fasching of 1824. Strauss was soon placed in command of a second smaller orchestra which was formed as a result of the success of the parent orchestra. In 1825, he decided to form his own band and began to write music (chiefly, dance music) for it to play. He realized that he could also possibly emulate the success of Lanner in addition to putting an end to his financial struggles. By so doing, he would have made Lanner a serious rival although the rivalry did not entail hostile consequences. The musical competition was very productive for the development of the waltz as well as other dance music in Vienna.

Strauss soon became one of the best-known and well loved dance composers in Vienna. During the carnival of 1826, Strauss inaugurated his long line of triumphs by introducing his band to the public of Vienna at the Schwan in the suburb of Roßau where his Täuberln-Walzer (Op. 1) at once established his reputation. He toured with his band to Germany, the Netherlands, Belgium and Britain. The conducting reins and management of this Strauss Orchestra would eventually be passed on to the hands of his sons until its disbandment by Eduard Strauss in 1901.

On a trip to France in 1837 Strauss heard the quadrille and began to compose them himself, becoming largely responsible for introducing that dance to Austria in the 1840 Fasching, where it became very popular. It was this very trip (in 1837) which has proved Strauss' popularity with audiences from different social backgrounds and this paved the way to forming an ambitious plan to perform his music in England for the coronation of Queen Victoria in 1838. Strauss also adapted various popular melodies of his day into his works so as to ensure a wider audience, as evidenced in the incorporation of the Oberon overture into his early waltz, "Wiener Carneval", Op. 3, and also the (at the time former) French national anthem "La Marseillaise" into his "Paris-Walzer", Op. 101.

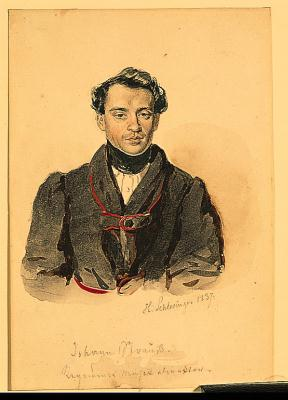
Johann Strauss I, 1837

Strauss married Maria Anna (Anna) Streim in 1825 in the Roman Catholic Lichtental Parish Church in Vienna. The marriage was relatively unhappy because of his prolonged absences caused by frequent tours abroad which led to a gradual alienation. They had six children: Johann (born 1825), Josef (born 1827), Anna (born 1829), Therese (born 1831), Ferdinand (born 1834 and living only ten months) and Eduard (born 1835). Eduard's first son was Johann Strauss III.

The family home was called 'Hirschenhaus' but was better known in Vienna as the 'Goldener Hirsch' (The Golden Stag). Strauss was a strict disciplinarian and demanded that none of his sons pursue careers in music, despite their display of musical talent. Johann Junior was to study banking, likewise his brother Josef Strauss was destined for a military career, whereas the youngest Eduard Strauss was expected to join the Austrian consulate.

By 1834 Strauss had taken a mistress, Emilie Sophia Anna Trampusch (née Tramposch) I, with whom he had eight children. When her husband openly acknowledged his paternity of a daughter born to Emilie in 1844, Anna sued for divorce. With the ending of the marriage, Anna Strauss determined to further Johann Strauss II's musical career, allowing him to develop his skills as a composer.

Despite family problems, Strauss senior continued to tour frequently and was always prepared to write novelty pieces for numerous charitable organizations. His waltzes were gradually developed from a rustic peasant dance into one which posterity would recognize as the Viennese waltz. They were written in three-quarter time with a short introduction; often with little or no reference to the later chain of five two-part waltz structure; usually appended with a short coda and concluded in a stirring finish, although his son Johann Strauss II expanded the waltz structure and utilized more instruments than his father. While he did not possess a musical talent as rich as his eldest son's, nor a business mind as astute, he was among the handful of early waltz composers along with Joseph Lanner to actively write pieces with individual titles — with the view to boost sales of their sheet music — which enabled music enthusiasts to easily recognize those pieces. In fact, during his performances at the Sperl-Ballroom in Vienna, where he established his name, he actively pursued the concept of collecting a fixed entrance fee from the patrons of the ballroom instead of the old practice of passing around a collection plate where income was reliant on the goodwill of the patrons.

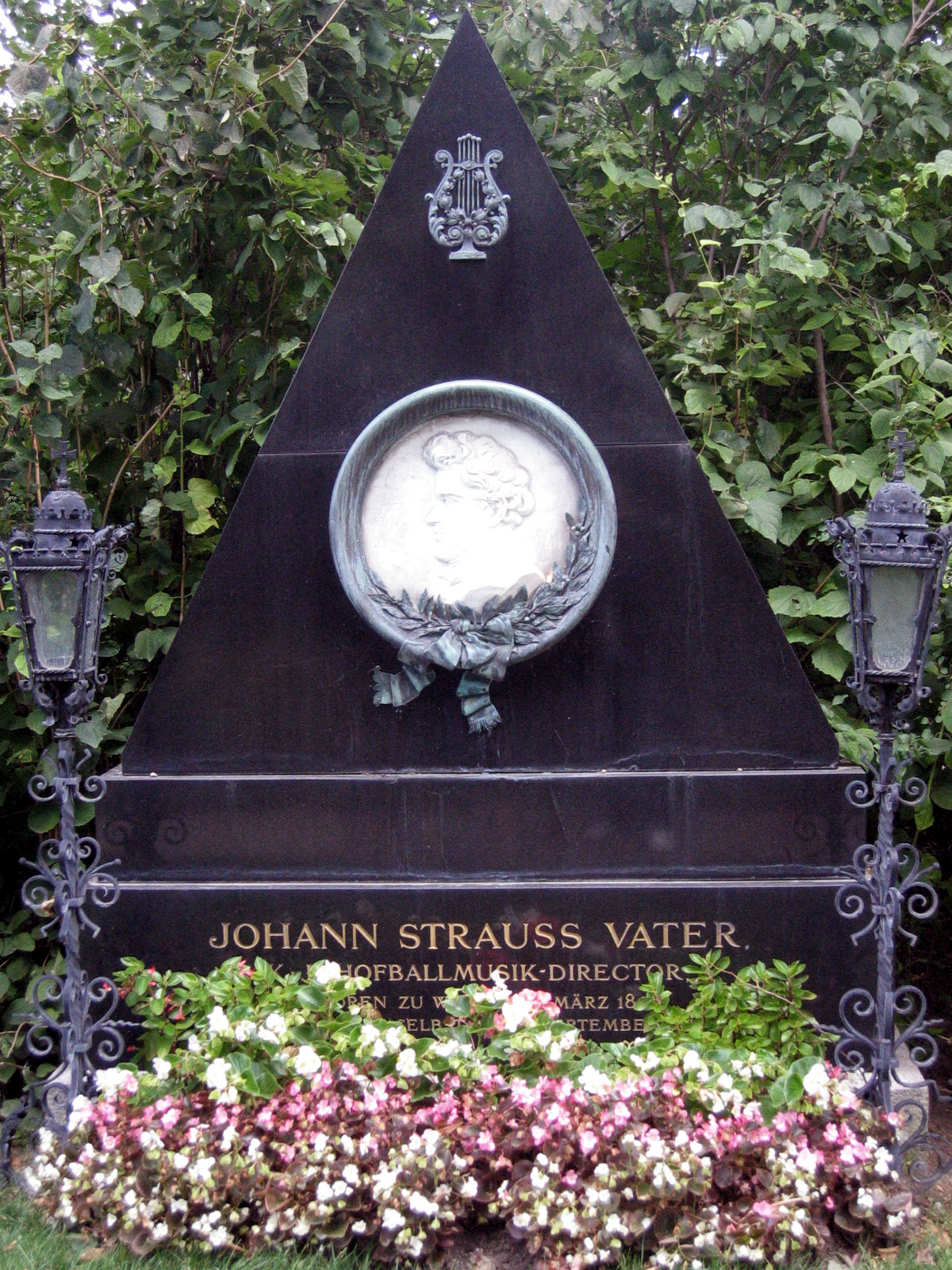
Grave of Johann Strauss I, Zentralfriedhof, Vienna, Austria

Johann Strauss II often played his father's works and openly declared his admiration of them, although it was no secret to the Viennese that their rivalry was intense, with the press at that time fueling it. Johann Strauss I refused to play again at the Dommayer's Casino, which offered his son his conducting debut, and was to tower over his son during his lifetime in terms of career advancement, but Strauss II was to eclipse him in terms of popularity in the classical repertoire. In 1846, Johann Strauss I was awarded the honorary title of K.K. Hofballmusikdirektor (Director of Music for the Imperial and Royal Court Balls) by Emperor Ferdinand I.

Strauss died in Vienna on 25 September 1849 at the age of 45 from scarlet fever contracted from one of his illegitimate children. He was buried at the Döblinger cemetery beside his friend Joseph Lanner. In 1904, both of their remains were transferred to the graves of honour at the Zentralfriedhof. The former Döbling Cemetery is now a Strauss-Lanner Park. Hector Berlioz paid tribute to the 'Father of the Viennese Waltz' by commenting that "Vienna without Strauss is like Austria without the Danube".

Nita Strauss, guitarist with Alice Cooper and others, claims to be a descendant of Johann Strauss; though she expressed uncertainty regarding her ostensible family connection in 2026.

== Works ==
=== Waltzes ===
Cover sheet of Loreley-Rhein-Klänge

- Täuberln-Walzer, Op. 1 Little Doves (1827)
- Döblinger Réunion-Walzer, Op. 2 Dobling Reunion Waltz
- Wiener Carneval, Op. 3 Viennese Carnival (1828)
- Kettenbrücke-Walzer, Op. 4 Suspension Bridge (1828)
- Gesellschafts-Walzer, Op. 5 Association’s Waltz
- Wiener Launen-Walzer, Op. 6 Vienna Fancies Waltz
- Tivoli-Rutsch Walzer, Op. 39 Tivoli-Slide (1830)
- Das Leben ein Tanz oder Der Tanz ein Leben! Walzer, Op. 49 Life is a Dance
- Elisabethen-Walzer, Op. 71
- Philomelen-Walzer, Op. 82
- Paris-Walzer, Op. 101 (1838)
- Huldigung der Königin Victoria von Grossbritannien, Op. 103 Homage to Queen Victoria of Great Britain
- Wiener Gemüths-Walzer, Op. 116 Viennese Sentiments (1840)
- Loreley-Rhein-Klänge, Op. 154 Echoes of the Rhine Loreley (1843)

=== Galops and polkas ===
Strauss's galops and polkas include:

- Champagner-Galopp, op. 8
- Seufzer-Galopp, Op. 9 Sighing
- Chineser Galopp, Op. 20 Chinese
- Einzugs-Galopp, Op. 35 Entrance Galop
- Sperl-Galopp, Op. 42
- Zampa-Galopp, Op. 62
- Fortuna-Galopp, Op. 69
- Jugendfeuer-Galopp, Op. 90 Young Spirit
- Cachucha-Galopp, Op. 97
- Carneval in Paris, Op.100
- Indianer-Galopp, Op. 111 Red Indian Galopp
- Sperl-Polka, Op. 133
- Annen-Polka, Op. 137 (not to be confused with his son's Annen-Polka, Op. 117, 1852)
- Wiener Kreutzer Polka, Op. 220
- Piefke und Pufke Polka, Op. 235

=== Marches ===
- Radetzky-Marsch, Op. 228 (1848)
- Jelačić-Marsch, Op. 244
- Marsch der Elisabether, AM Il-126

== See also ==
- The Strauss Family, TV drama
- Waltzes from Vienna, a film
- List of Austrians in music
- Strauss Museum Vienna
