= Ida Ekman =

Finnish singer

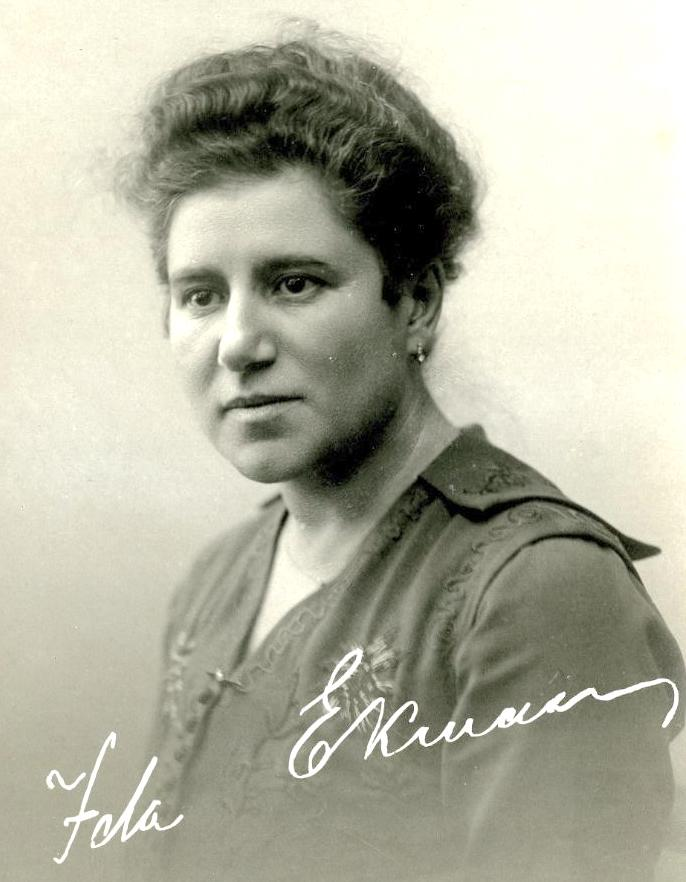
Ida Ekman (c. 1910s)

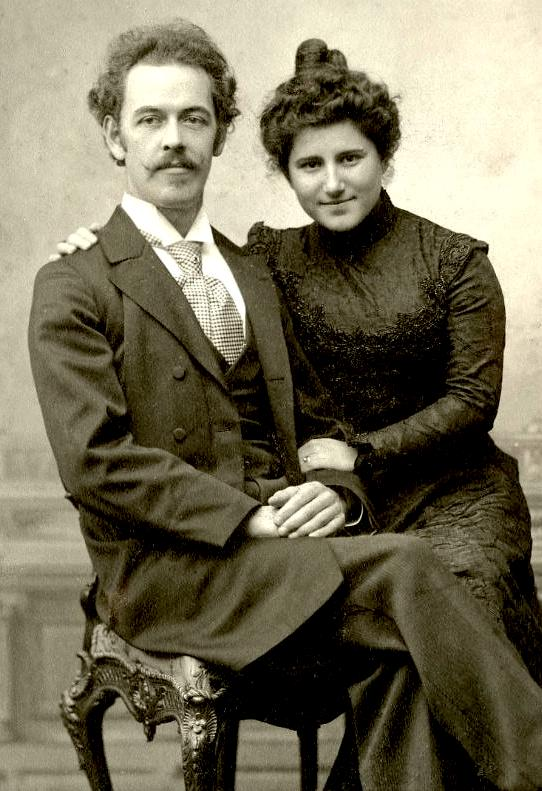
Ida in 1895 with her husband and accompanist Karl Ekman.

Ida Paulina Ekman (22 April 1875 – 14 April 1942) was a Finnish soprano singer. She was also referred to as Ida Morduch-Ekman. Her career was mainly in oratorio and lieder, and she was a renowned interpreter of the songs of Jean Sibelius, many of which were dedicated to her and her husband Karl Ekman, with whose career her own was closely connected. Sibelius regarded her as his favourite singer.

== Biography ==
Ida Paulina Morduch was born in Helsinki in 1875 to Jewish parents Israel Jacob Morduch (1833–76) and Eva Grünblatt (1833–1913). Her stepfather was Arye Leib Krapinsky (1832–1897). She studied at the Russian Girls School in Helsinki, Vienna (under Pauline Lucca), Germany and Italy. She sang with the Nuremberg Opera for a time, but her greatest success came in lieder. In 1895, when she was 19, she married the pianist, composer and conductor Karl Ekman, a piano student of Ferruccio Busoni. She appeared in concert with Edvard Grieg. Ernst Mielck's song "Heimath" (1898) was dedicated to Ida Morduch-Ekman. She accompanied Robert Kajanus and Jean Sibelius on their European tour in the summer of 1900. She was the a soloist with the Helsinki Philharmonic Orchestra on its visit to the 1900 World's Fair in Paris. She probably sang in the concert of 25 July 1900 in the Salle de la Grande Harmonie in Brussels. She had earlier been instrumental in bringing Sibelius's music to the attention of Johannes Brahms, who died in 1897.

She was particularly appreciated by Sibelius himself, who dedicated a number of his songs to her and she was their first interpreter. There exists a manuscript score of the song "Spring is flying", Op. 13, No. 4, with an inscription from Sibelius "To Ida Ekman, the incomparable "Sibelius singer", with gratitude from Jean Sibelius". She gave the first performance of "The Tryst", Op. 37, No. 5 in late January 1901 in Berlin. Her Sibelius dedications included three songs from Op. 36 – "Black Roses", "But my bird is long in homing" and "Tennis at Trianon"; "On a balcony by the sea", Op. 38, No. 2, and all the songs from Opp. 86, 88 and 90. Ekman performed the Op. 90 songs for the first time at her jubilee concerts in October 1917, at the end of her career.

After the retirement of Aino Ackté, Ida Ekman became the preeminent interpreter of Sibelius's songs. Sibelius wrote in his diary in 1918: "They - our female singers - 'they make too much' of every phrase. The absolute music which I write is so exclusively musical and strictly independent of words that reciting them is not a good idea. Ida Ekman has understood this which is why she is incomparable".

Ida Ekman made some recordings between 1904 and 1908, including songs in 1906 that were among the first compositions by Sibelius ever to be recorded. The Sibelius songs were "Was it a dream?", Op. 37, No. 4; "Longing", Op. 50, No. 2; "But my bird is long in homing", Op. 36, No. 2; "A maiden yonder sings", Op. 50, No. 3; "Black Roses", Op. 36, No. 1; "And I questioned then no further", Op. 17, No. 1; and "Tennis at Trianon", Op. 36, No. 3. She also recorded songs by Richard Strauss and arias from operas by Tchaikovsky and Handel. A selection of her recordings can be heard here.

She influenced Sibelius to orchestrate some of his songs originally written for voice and piano; these included "Spring is flying" (Op. 13, No. 4), "And I questioned then no further" (Op. 17, No. 1), "The Diamond on the March snow" (Op. 36, No. 6), "Sunrise" (Op. 37, No. 3), "On a balcony by the sea" (Op. 38, No. 2) and "Night" (Op. 38, No. 3), orchestrated between 1903 and 1914.

On 21 October 1905, she sang Hector Berlioz's Les nuits d'été as part of the seventh of Ferruccio Busoni's Orchesterabende in Berlin.

Ida and Karl Ekman had a son, Karl Ekman Jr (1895–1962), a noted biographer of Sibelius. She died in 1942, aged 66.

In 2003, the manuscripts of four Sibelius songs ("The Girl Came from A Meeting With Her Love", "Was It A Dream?", "Spring Passes So Quickly", and "Lost") dedicated to Ida Ekman turned up in a Helsinki bank vault.

== Sources ==
- Grove's Dictionary of Music and Musicians, 5th ed, 1954, Eric Blom, ed.
