= Döblinger Réunion-Walzer =

Döblinger Réunion-Walzer (Döbling Reunion Waltz), opus 2, is a waltz composed by Johann Strauss I in 1826. The orchestral arrangement of the work was for 1 flute, 2 clarinets, 2 horns, 1 trumpet, 1st and 2nd violins, viola (3 violins), double bass and percussion. The composition was first performed at the Ober-Döbling, just over 5 kilometres from Vienna.
