= Walzer (surname) =

Walzer is a German surname. It may refer to:

- Andreas Walzer (born 1970), German cyclist and Olympic medalist
- Antonio Walzer (1909–?), Argentine wrestler and Olympics competitor
- Judith Walzer Leavitt (born 1940), American science and medicine historian; sister of Michael Walzer
- Michael Walzer (born 1935), American political theorist, editor, and public intellectual; brother of Judith Walzer Leavitt
- Raphael Walzer (born Josef Walzer; 1888–1966), German Benedictine monk
- Richard Rudolf Walzer (1900–1975), German-born British philologist, linguist, orientalist, author, and Farabi scholar
- Tina Walzer, Austrian author, editor, and historian of Austrian-Jewish studies
- Werner Walzer (born 1947), Austrian footballer

== See also ==
- Walser (surname)
- Waltzer (surname)
- Wälzer (surname)
