= Wiener Carneval =

Wiener Carneval (Viennese Carnival), opus 3, is a waltz composed by Johann Strauss I in 1828. The waltz was intended as a contribution to the carnival of 1828 Johann Strauss appeared as leader of a group of musicians at the balls at the Kettenbrücke in Leopoldstadt. The fourth waltz theme incorporates melodies from Carl Maria von Weber's Ocean aria from Oberon, with Rezia's words Mein Hüon, mein Gatte, die Retter, sie nah’n (My Hüon, my husband, the rescuers approach), partly as a tribute to Weber, who had died not long before Strauss' waltz was composed.
