= 14 Bagatelles =

Musical composition by Béla Bartók

- by Béla Bartók
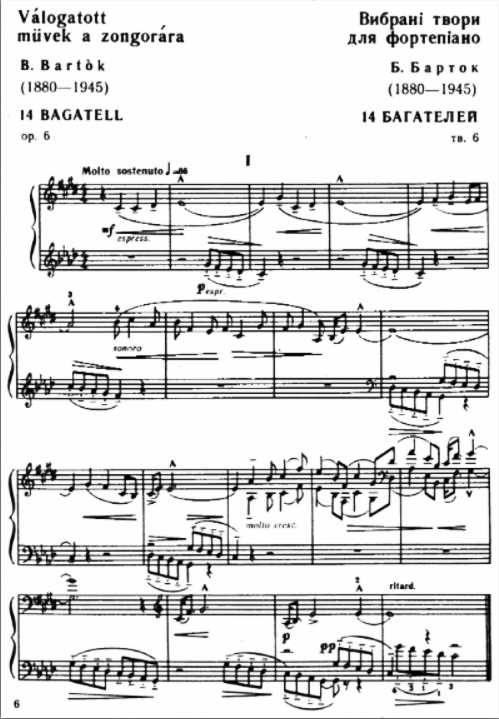
- Béla Bartók, 14 Bagatelles (Set III, Op. 6)
- Opus: 6
- Composed: 1908
- Performed: 1908
- Published: 1909 (Rozsnyai Károly, Budapest)
- Movements: 14
- Scoring: Piano

14 Bagatelles, Sz.38, BB 50; 3rd Set, Op. 6 (Hungarian: 14 Bagatell) is a set of pieces for solo piano by Hungarian composer Béla Bartók, written in the spring of 1908 and first performed by the composer June 29, 1908, in Berlin. The work was published the following year in Budapest by Rozsnyai Károly. Composed the same year as Ten Easy Pieces, 14 Bagatelles was experimental and signified Bartók's departure from the tonality of 19th century composition. The work borders on atonality, and Bartók adopted some techniques of Debussy and Schoenberg.

== Background ==
Bartók, along with composer Zoltán Kodály, began collecting Hungarian folk music in 1905. Curious about the particular national features of folk music, Bartók believed that the most interesting folk traditions existed in a multicultural environment with an active exchange of ideas between cultures. The first Bagatelle may reflect some of Bartók's view of multicultural folk music, with different key signatures for left and right hands.

Alex Ross has suggested that the Bagatelles were influenced by Bartók's unrealized affections for Stefi Geyer, a 19 year old violinist he met while collecting folk songs in Transylvania.

== Sections ==
1. Molto sostenuto
2. Allegro giocoso
3. Andante
4. Grave
5. Vivo
6. Lento
7. Allegretto molto capriccioso
8. Andante sostenuto
9. Allegretto grazioso
10. Allegro
11. Allegretto molto rubato
12. Rubato
13. Elle est morte. Lento funebre
14. Valse: Ma mie qui danse. Presto

== See also ==
- Ten Easy Pieces (Bartók)
