= OP9 cell =

OP9 cells are a cell line derived from mouse bone marrow stromal cells (mesenchyme). These cells are now characterized as stem cells. When co-cultured with embryonic stem cells (ESC), OP9 cells can induce ESC to differentiate into blood cells by serving as a feeder layer. They have the potential to be used in cell therapy, regenerative medicine and as immunomodulators.

== Characteristics ==
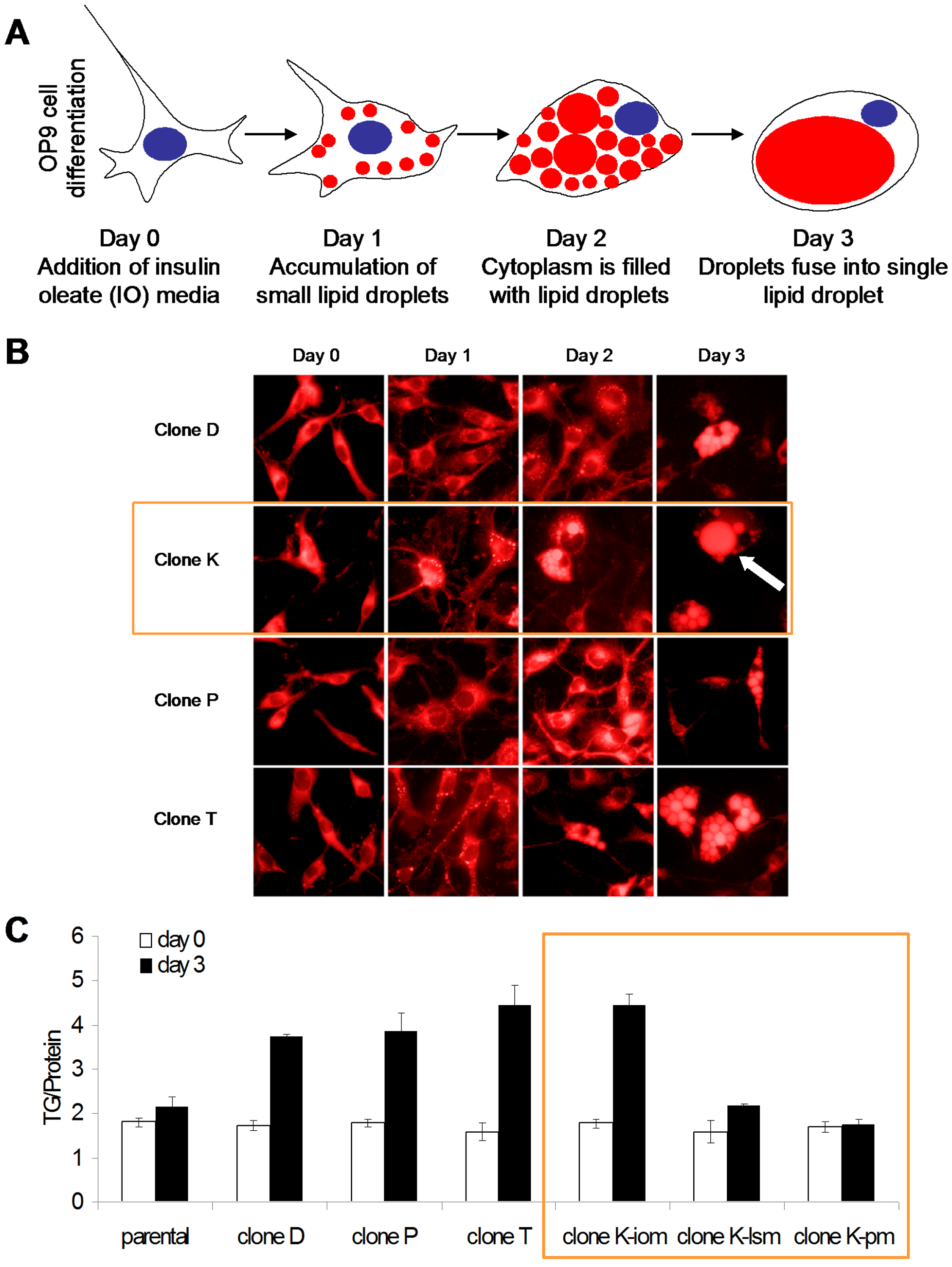
OP9 cells differentiate into adipocytes

=== Origin ===
The OP9 cell line was deposited by T. Nakano with his development of a co-culture system to cause ESC differentiation into several lineages of blood cells. Its immunophenotype is identical to standard mouse MSCs. It was cultured from the newborn calvaria of osteopetrosis mutant mice lacking functional macrophage colony stimulating factor (M-CSF). Certain markers, including CD140a+, CD140b+, α-SMA+ and Calponin+, indicate a perivascular origin of this cell line.

=== Morphology ===
OP9 cells have been determined to have a bipolar, fibroblast-like, homogeneous morphology. Assessing OP9 has been done in past studies using immunofluorescence staining and flow cytometry. Absence of certain markers, CD45, CD11b, Flk-1, CD31, and CD34, demonstrate a non-hematopoietic and non-endothelial identity.

=== Properties ===
==== Mesenchymal potential ====
OP9 cells could increase the potential of expanding mouse mesenchymal stem cells (MSCs) in vitro and help with the understanding of biological features of MSCs. Differentiation assays are used to identify MSCs, and the mesenchymal potential of OP9 cells was confirmed through their ability differentiate when cultured in an adipogenic medium.

==== Hematopoietic potential ====
OP9 cells increase hematopoietic supportive capacity of hemogenic precursors and progeny when ES cells are cultured with the cell line. This contributes to the understanding of the differentiation of hematopoietic cells from MSCs, including B cell lineages, erythrocytes, lymphocytes, and megakaryocytes. Additionally, when multipotent germline stem cells (mGS) are differentiated on OP9 cells, they can produce Flkl1+ cells which then produce hematopoietic progenitors when replated with certain cytokines.

==== Clonogenic potential ====
OP9 cells have been shown to facilitate the differentiation of MSCs into osteocytes, chondrocytes, myocytes, tenocytes and adipocytes. Their migration has been prompted as well through the use of growth factors such as bFGF, IGF-1, IL-3, PDGF-BB, TGF-β1 and TGF-β3.

=== Limitations ===
Because OP9 alone is not an immortalized cell line, many animal sacrifices are necessary to provide sufficient amounts for experimental use. A primary cell culture can only be used for up to one month, therefore limiting the use of the line to short-term, small-scale projects.

=== Variations ===
==== IOP9 ====
IOP9 is an immortalized feeder cell line established from the genes HPV16 E6 and E7 genes that stimulates hematopoietic differentiation. It is a source of unlimited feeder cells, which reduces the number of animals sacrifices needed to provide these cells.

== Applications in research ==
=== Generation and suppression of T lymphocytes ===
OP9 cells contain the ligand delta-like 1 (DL1) which triggers the NOTCH signaling pathway in co-cultured stem cells. This in turn causes the proliferation of T lymphocytes in vitro, which can act against malignant tumors. Additionally, the lymphocyte transformation test (LTT) and mixed leukocyte reaction (MLR) revealed that OP9 cells can suppress T lymphocyte proliferation when stimulated by mitogens or allogeneic lymphocytes. Specifically, T cell proliferation by nonspecific polyclonial activators occurred at a 50% reduced rate when OP9 cells were present.

=== Generation of adipocytes ===
OP9 cells have the ability to rapidly differentiate into adipocytes after expressing marker proteins and may contribute to a novel adipogenesis model. The mRNA expression of adipsin and PPARy2 in OP9 cells confirm their adipocyte differentiation potential. In addition, OP9 cells can express adipocyte late marker proteins, including glucose transporter 4 and adiponectin after exposure to adipocytic stimuli and accumulation of triacylglycerol. This process occurs efficiently; within two days, OP9 cells can differentiate into adipocytes. The rate of OP9 differentiation is not reduced by high cell density or long periods in an initial culture, making them useful in generating stable adipocyte cell lines.

=== Treatment of cerebral infarction ===
Cerebral infarction involves a disruption of the flow of blood in the brain due to a complication with the blood vessels supplying this blood. Umbilical cord blood (UCB) transplantation in animals alleviates symptoms of cerebral infarction due to new blood vessel formation. OP9 has been shown to enhance angiogenic effects of the UCB in vitro.

== See also ==
- Mouse Embryonic Fibroblasts (MEF)
