= Kettenbrücke-Walzer =

Waltz composed by Johann Strauss in 1828

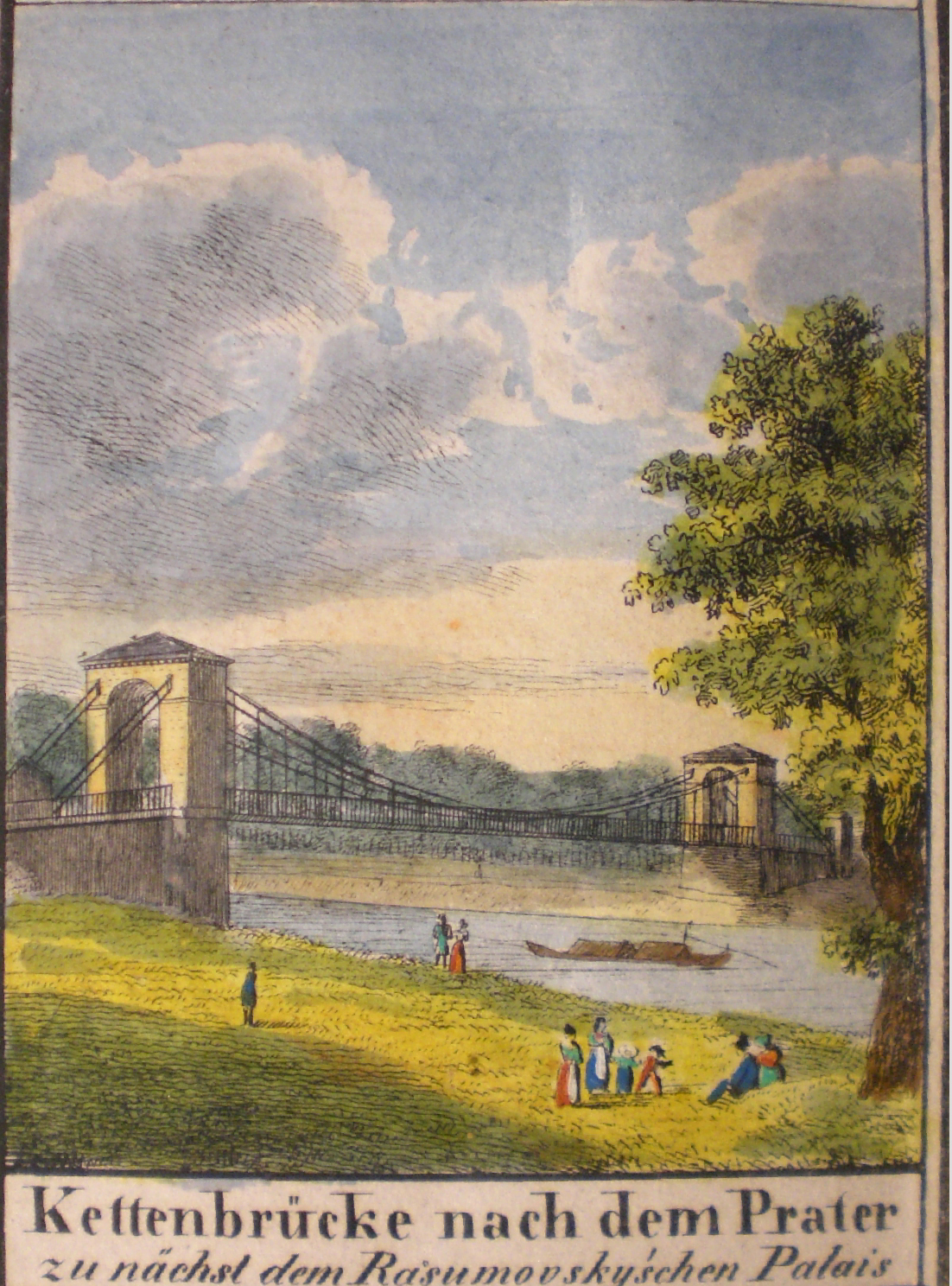
Chain bridge after which the waltz is named

Kettenbrücke-Walzer (Chain Bridge Waltz), Op. 4, is a waltz composed by Johann Strauss I in 1828. Its title commemorated the construction of the first chain bridge over the Donaukanal through the inner city, Sophienbrücke in Vienna, built after a design by Ignaz Mitis and completed in 1825.

The waltz is orchestrated for one flute, two clarinets, two horns, timpani, three violins and a double bass.
