= Vienna Walzer Orchestra =

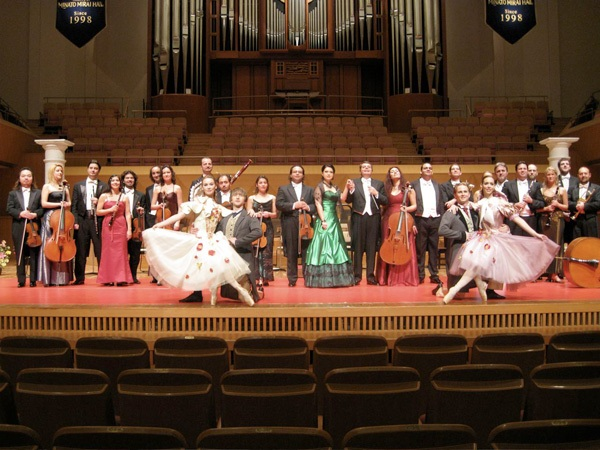
The Vienna Walzer Orchestra at the Yokohama Minato Mirai Hall in Tokyo, Japan (2009)

The Vienna Walzer Orchestra (German: Wiener Walzer Orchester) is a chamber orchestra based in Vienna, Austria that specializes in traditional Viennese waltzes, polkas, marches and operetta arias from composers such as: J. Strauss II, F. Lehár, C.M. Ziehrer, among others. Their concerts also always include performances by ballet dancers and opera singers.

Founded in 1990 by Dr. Sandro Cuturello, it is made up of musicians of various nationalities and backgrounds who live and work in Vienna. Dr. Cuturello serves as the principal conductor and artistic manager of this ensemble.

They have performed in: Musikverein, Konzerthaus (Vienna, Austria), Seoul Arts Center (South Korea), throughout China (incl. Beijing and Shanghai), as well as in Italy, Spain, Germany and the Czech Republic. They have also been touring Japan annually since 2000. These New Year’s Concerts include performances at: Tokyo Opera City, Tokyo Metropolitan Theatre, Yokohama Minato Mirai Hall, The Symphony Hall (Osaka), as well as in many other Japanese concert halls.

The Vienna Walzer Orchestra is represented and managed by Culturell Events, which is located in the 6th district of Vienna.
