= Walliser =

Walliser may refer to:

- People from the Swiss canton of Valais (German: Wallis)
- Pennine Alps (German: Walliser Alpen)
- Walliser German, an Alemannic dialect spoken in Valais and other regions of the Alps
- Cole Walliser (born 1981), a Canadian filmmaker and music video director
- Maria Walliser (born 1963), a Swiss former alpine skier
- Ursi Walliser (born 1975), a Swiss skeleton racer
