= Waltzer (surname) =

Waltzer is a surname. Notable people with the surname include:

- Jack Waltzer (fl. since 1967), American acting coach and actor
- Kenneth Waltzer (born 1942), American Holocaust historian, author and educator

== See also ==
- Walser (surname)
- Walzer (surname)
- Wälzer (surname)
