= Military march (Bruckner) =

- by Anton Bruckner
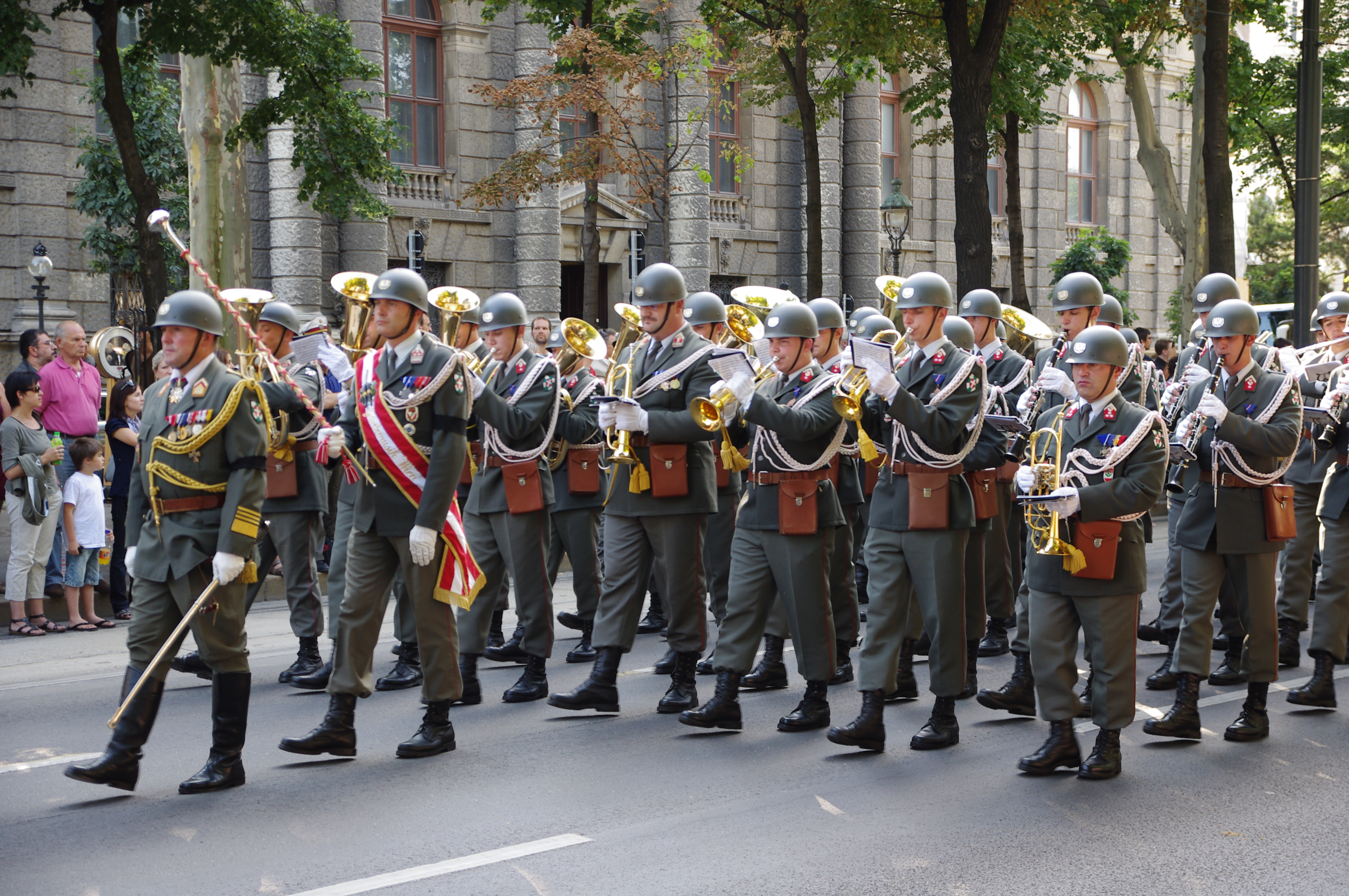
- Military band in Austria
- Key: E♭ major
- Catalogue: WAB 116
- Composed: 12 August 1865: Linz
- Dedication: Militär-Kapelle der Jäger-Truppe
- Published: 1922
- Recorded: 1976
- Instrumental: Military band

The Military march in E♭ major, WAB 116, is a military march composed by Anton Bruckner in 1865.

== History ==
Bruckner composed this for him unique work on 12 August 1865 during his stay in Linz, at the time when he was composing his first symphony,

He composed this occasional work for the Militär-Kapelle der Jäger-Truppe (Military band of the hunting troop) in Linz, as a gesture of appreciation for its participation in performances of two of his works, the festive cantata Preiset den Herrn and Germanenzug. However, it is not known whether it ever was performed by this military band. In the Bruckner-Handbuch is only noted that the march was presumably performed in Linz in 1865.

Bruckner's manuscript is stored in the Österreichische Nationalbibliothek. It was first edited in Band III/2, pp. 226–233 of the Göllerich/Auer biography. The work is put in Band XII/8 of the Gesamtausgabe.

== Music ==
The work, a march of 32-bar and a trio of 32 bars too, is scored in E♭ major for military band (piccolo, 5 clarinets, 2 flugelhorns, 7 trumpets, 3 horns, 2 trombones, 3 euphoniums, 2 tubas, drums and bass drum).

In the hunting scherzo [of Symphony No. 4], where the dense and brilliant brass scoring recalls Bruckner's 1865 infantry march in E♭, WAB 116 ...

=== Apollo-Marsch ===
Another military march, the Apollo-Marsch, was for many years attributed to Bruckner and put as WAB 115 by Grasberger. This march was even performed on 14 September 1924, to celebrate the 100th anniversary of Bruckner's birth.

It is now definite that the Apollo-Marsch was composed in 1857 as Mazzuchelli-Marsch for the Austria-Hungary Infantry-regiment No. 10 by Béla Kéler, another Kitzler's student, while Bruckner copied the instrumentation and form exactly, but not the music, for his own Marsch in E♭ major.

The Apollo-Marsch is put in an addendum to Band XII/8 of the Gesamtausgabe.

== Discography ==
There are four recordings of Bruckner's Military march:

- Désiré Dondeyne, La Musique des Gardiens de la Paix de la Préfecture de Police de Paris, Marches militaires allemandes. Anthologie de la Musique d'Harmonie – LP:Societé d'études et de Réalisations Publicitaires (SERP) MC 7.033, 1976. A digitalization of the march can be heard on John Berky's website.
- Ryusuke Numajiri, Osaka Municipal Symphonic Band, Harmoniemusik of the Great Composers – CD: Exton OVCL-00113, 2002
- Clark Rundell, Royal Northern College of Music Wind Orchestra, Experiments on a March – CD: Chandos CHAN 10367, 2005
- Major Arjan Tien, Marine Band of the Royal Netherlands Navy, Worthweill Originals – CD: Channel Classics, CCS 4219, 2018

== Sources ==
- August Göllerich, Anton Bruckner. Ein Lebens- und Schaffens-Bild, c. 1922 – posthumous edited by Max Auer by G. Bosse, Regensburg, 1932
- Uwe Harten, Anton Bruckner. Ein Handbuch, Residenz Verlag, Salzburg, 1996. ISBN 3-7017-1030-9.
- Anton Bruckner – Sämtliche Werke, Band XII/8: Marsch in Es-Dur für Blasorchester (1865), Musikwissenschaftlicher Verlag der Internationalen Bruckner-Gesellschaft, Rüdiger Bornhöft (Editor), Vienna, 1996
- Cornelis van Zwol, Anton Bruckner 1824–1896 – Leven en werken, uitg. Thoth, Bussum, Netherlands, 2012. ISBN 978-90-6868-590-9
- Crawford Howie, Anton Bruckner - A documentary biography, online revised edition
- Carragan, William (2020). Anton Bruckner – Eleven Symphonies. Windsor, Connecticut: Bruckner Society of America. ISBN 978-1-938911-59-0.
