= Wiener Launen-Walzer =

Wiener Launen-Walzer (Vienna Fancies Waltz), opus 6, is a waltz composed by Johann Strauss I. It premiered in the ballroom of the Weisser Schwan on 26 November 1827. The evening marked the beginning of the first Katharinen-Ball, the last dance celebration before the beginning of Advent. It was one of the first of Strauss' works to contain a definite form: an introduction, the waltz themes, and a coda. The principal waltz theme is in the key of E-flat major.
