= Wälzer (surname) =

Wälzer is a German-language surname. Notable people with the surname include:

- Karel Wälzer (1888–1948), Czech ice hockey player
- Libor Wälzer (born 1975), Czech weightlifter

== See also ==
- Waltzer (surname)
- Walzer (surname)
- Harald Welzer, German social psychologist and author
