= Christmas Concerto =

1690 composition by Arcangelo Corelli

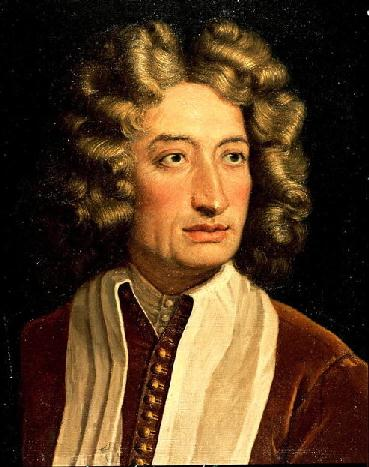
Arcangelo Corelli

The Concerto grosso in G minor, Op. 6, No. 8, by Arcangelo Corelli, known commonly as the Christmas Concerto, was commissioned by Cardinal Pietro Ottoboni and published posthumously in 1714 as part of Corelli's Twelve concerti grossi, Op. 6. The concerto bears the inscription Fatto per la notte di Natale ("made for the night of Christmas"). Its composition date is uncertain, but there is a record of Corelli having performed a Christmas concerto in 1690 for the enjoyment of his new patron.

The concerto is scored for an ensemble consisting of two concertino violins and cello, ripieno strings and continuo. The work is structured as a concerto da chiesa, in this case expanded from a typical four movement structure to six:

Movements I and II

Movements IV to VI
All performed by the Advent Chamber Orchestra

1. Vivace, 3/4 – Grave. Arcate, sostenuto e come stà, 4/2
2. Allegro,
3. Adagio – Allegro – Adagio,, E♭ major
4. Vivace, 3/4
5. Allegro,
6. Largo. Pastorale ad libitum, 12/8, G major

Each relatively short movement provides multiple tempi and a range of major and minor suspensions. The concerto is generally no longer than fifteen minutes, ending with Corelli's famous Pastorale ad libitum, a peaceful 12/8 finale in the pastorale form.
