= Joseph Lanner =

Austrian dance music composer

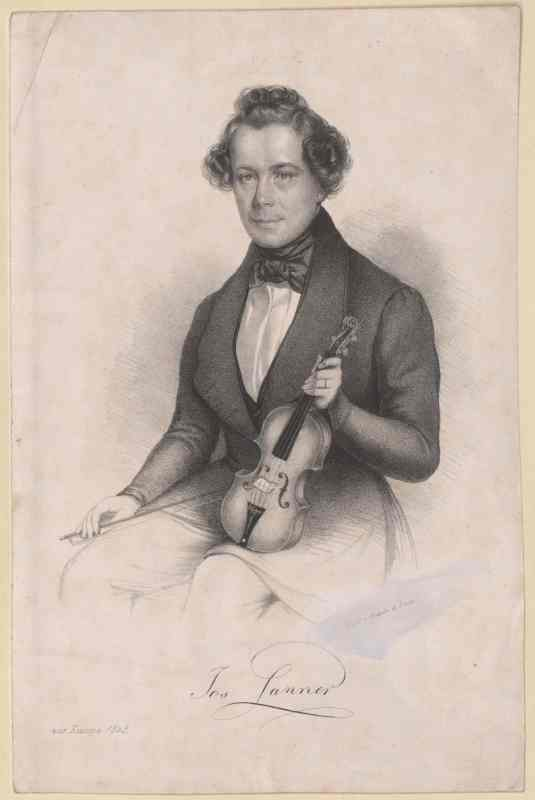
Lanner (c. 1825)

Joseph Lanner (12 April 1801 – 14 April 1843) was an Austrian dance music composer and dance orchestra conductor. He is best remembered as one of the earliest Viennese composers to reform the waltz from a simple peasant dance to something that even the highest society could enjoy, either as an accompaniment to the dance, or for the music's own sake. He was just as famous as his friend and musical rival Johann Strauss I, who was better known outside of Austria in their day because of his concert tours abroad, in particular to France and England.

Lanner had a lesser-known son, August Lanner, who was just as musically gifted and prodigious as his father, but whose budding career was cut short by his early death at age 20. His daughter Katharina became a well-known international ballet dancer, settling in London where she became an influential choreographer and teacher.

== Biography ==
Lanner was born in St. Ulrich in Vienna (today the district of Neubau). Largely self-taught on the violin, he joined a small string orchestra of Michael Pamer at about the same time as Johann Strauss I did, although he decided to venture into the music business himself and partnered with Karl and Johann Drahanek, forming a quartet that bore his name. The success of this string quartet led to its gradual expansion, and in 1824 Lanner was able to conduct a small string orchestra playing Viennese dance music. Such was the success of his orchestra that it was a regular feature in many Vienna carnivals, popularly known in the local dialect as the Fasching. It was in 1832 that Lanner allowed his soon-to-be rival Johann Strauss I to deputise in a second, smaller orchestra that was formed that year to meet the busy schedule of the Carnival activities.

Lanner was already gaining a reputation at the end of the 1825 Carnival season and Strauss I was frustrated at having to deputise when necessary and as a result, his works were not getting the recognition he thought they deserved. In the same year, Strauss I parted company with Lanner after a concert at one of the Viennese dance establishments, Zum Schwarzen Bock (The Black Ram). Although many press reports stated a furious encounter between the two composers including a rumor that Strauss forcibly departed the orchestra with a few of Lanner's talented musicians, these remained largely unsubstantiated as Lanner had earlier dedicated a waltz to Strauss entitled "Trennungs-Walzer" ("Separation Waltz"), Op. 19, which indicated a decent level of goodwill and respect for the craft of the two composers. Further, Lanner and Strauss I worked together often despite having severed their partnership and even gave a benefit concert for their former employer, Michael Pamer who was taken ill in 1826 at the same establishment where they separated. For their charity work Strauss and Lanner also accepted the honorary citizenship of Vienna in 1836 and jointly took the Citizen's Oath.

The music-loving Viennese however were championing both of these two popular dance music composers, and individuals generally identified themselves as Lannerianer or Straussianer. In fact, it was believed that the ruling Habsburg dynasty was anxious to divert its Viennese populace from politics and the revolutionary ideas that were feverishly sweeping Europe, with many cities preparing to overthrow any unpopular monarch. The answer would be to distract the population with music and entertainment, and the musical positions that both Lanner and Strauss held were soon seen to be very important. Lanner himself was appointed to the coveted post of Musik-Direktor of the Redoutensäle in the Hofburg Imperial Palace of which his primary duties were to conduct concerts held in honor of the nobility and to compose new works for the Court orchestra.

Strauss's popularity soon overshadowed Lanner's in the early 1840s. Strauss was eager to undertake extensive lucrative tours abroad including England, whereas Lanner held on in Vienna unconvinced that the other nationalities were prepared to listen to Viennese music. Lanner succumbed to a typhus infection that racked Vienna in 1843 and died at Döbling on Good Friday, 14 April, in the same year. The famous rivalry with Strauss I had ended; Lanner's death marked the beginning of a period where the Strauss family was to dominate the Viennese dance music scene for well over a half a century and concluded an era of interesting and exciting developments for the waltz and other popular dance music.

== Compositions ==
Among Lanner's more popular works are the "Pesther-Walzer", Op. 93, "Hofballtänze Walzer", Op. 161, "Die Werber" Waltz, Op. 103, "Die Romantiker" Waltz, Op. 167, and probably his most well-known work, "Die Schönbrunner" Walzer, Op. 200, probably the most famous of all waltzes before "The Blue Danube" by Johann Strauss II in the mid-1860s. Most of Lanner's waltzes were dedicated to members of the nobility as evidenced from the titles which was part of the nature of Lanner's position at that time. His "Styrian Dances" (Steyrische-Tänze), Op. 165, was also played occasionally at the Vienna New Year's Concert of the Vienna Philharmonic Orchestra.

=== Works ===
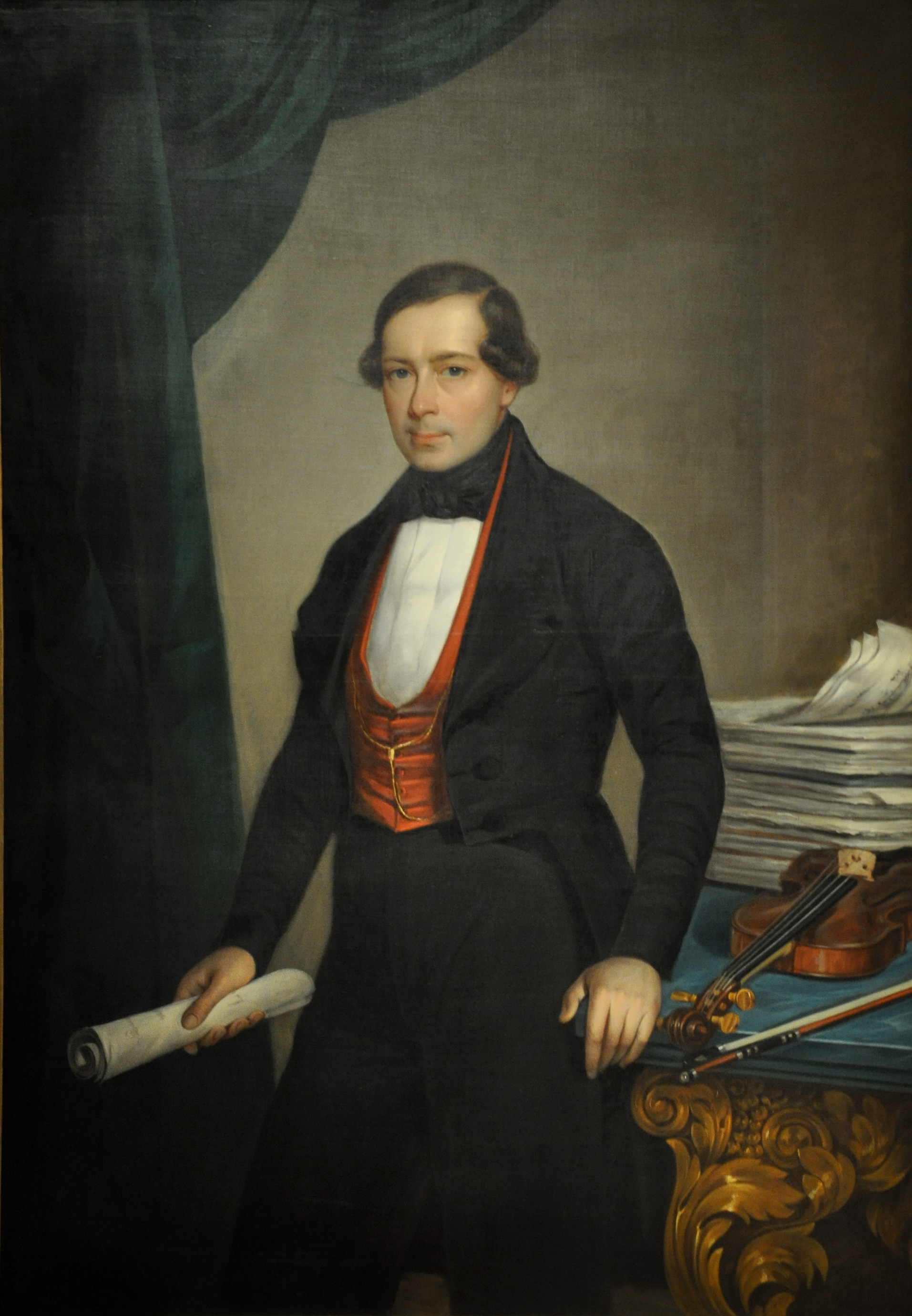
Joseph Lanner, c. 1840

- "Neue Wiener", Ländler (New Viennese), Op. 1
- "Trennungs-Walzer", waltz (Separation), Op. 19
- "Amoretten", waltz, Op. 53
- "Die Humoristiker", waltz (The Humorists), Op. 92
- "Pesther-Walzer", Op. 93
- "Abschied von Pest", waltz (Farewell from Pest), Op. 95
- "Die Werber", Op. 103
- "Marien-Walzer", (Maria Waltz), Op. 143
- "Malapou", galop, Op. 148
- "Hofballtänze", waltz (Royal Court Dances), Op.161
- "Steyrische Tänze" (Styrian Dances), Op. 165
- "Die Romantiker", waltz (The Romantics), Op.167
- "Hans-Jörgel", polka, Op. 194
- "Die Mozartisten", waltz, Op. 196 (based on themes from the operas of Wolfgang Amadeus Mozart )
- "Die Schönbrunner", waltz, Op. 200
