= Hungarian opera =

Music genre

The origins of Hungarian opera can be traced to the late 18th century, with the rise of imported opera and other concert styles in cities like Pozsony (now Bratislava), Kismarton, Nagyszeben and Budapest. Operas at the time were in either the German or Italian style. The field Hungarian opera began with school dramas and interpolations of German operas, which began at the end of the 18th century. School dramas in places like the Pauline School in Sátoraljaújhely, the Calvinist School in Csurgó and the Piarist School in Beszterce.

Pozsony produced the first music drama experiments in the country, though the work of Gáspár Pacha and József Chudy; it was the latter's 1793 Prince Pikkó and Jutka Perzsi that is generally considered the first Hungarian opera. The text of that piece was translated from Prinz Schnudi und Prinzessin Evakathel by Philipp Hafner. This style was still strongly informed by the Viennese Zauberposse style of comedic play, and remained thus throughout the 19th century. Though these operas used foreign styles, the "idyllic, lyric and heroic" parts of the story were always based on verbunkos, which was becoming a symbol of the Hungarian nation during this time. It was not until the middle of the 19th century that Ferenc Erkel wrote the first Hungarian language opera, using French and Italian models, thus launching the field of Hungarian opera.

== Notable Hungarian opera singers ==
- Bencze Miklós
- Csillag, Róza
- Déryné Széppataki, Róza
- Erdős, Richárd
- Ernster, Dezső
- Gerster, Etelka
- von Gomperz-Bettelheim, Caroline
- Földi, András
- Hamari, Julia
- Házy, Erzsébet
- Honthy, Hanna
- von Ilosvay, Maria
- Ivogün, Maria
- Kiss B., Atilla
- Klafsky, Katharina
- Kelen, Tibor
- Komlósi, Ildikó
- László, Magda
- Marton, Éva
- Miklósa, Erika
- Nagy, Róbert
- Pálmay, Ilka
- Rost, Andrea
- Sass, Sylvia
- Székely, Mihály
- Várady, Júlia
- Kolonits, Klára

== Notable Hungarian classical musicians ==
- Tóth, Andor
- Tóth, Andor (ifj.)

== Notable Hungarian composers ==
- Ábrányi, Emil
- Adler, Vincent
- Balogh, Ernő
- Bartók, Béla
- Eötvös, Péter
- Erkel, Ferenc
- Farkas, Ferenc
- Fényes, Szabolcs
- Gárdonyi, Zoltán
- Göncz, Zoltán
- Hajdú, Lóránt
- Horváth, Josef Maria
- Illés, Márton
- Jarno, Georg
- Kálmán, Imre
- Kersch, Ferenc
- Kodály, Zoltán
- Kósa, György
- Kossovits, József
- Kurtág, György
- Lajtha, László
- Lehár, Ferenc
- Nagy, Ervin
- Lévay, Szilveszter
- Lendvay, Kamilló
- Maros, Miklós
- Melis, László
- Pongrácz, Zoltán
- Radnai, Miklós
- Sáry, László
- Szemző, Tibor
- Szokolay, Sándor
- Thern, Károly
- von Wayditch, Gabriel
- Zichy, Géza

== See also ==
- Category:Hungarian-language operas
