= 1871 in music =

This article is about music-related events in 1871.

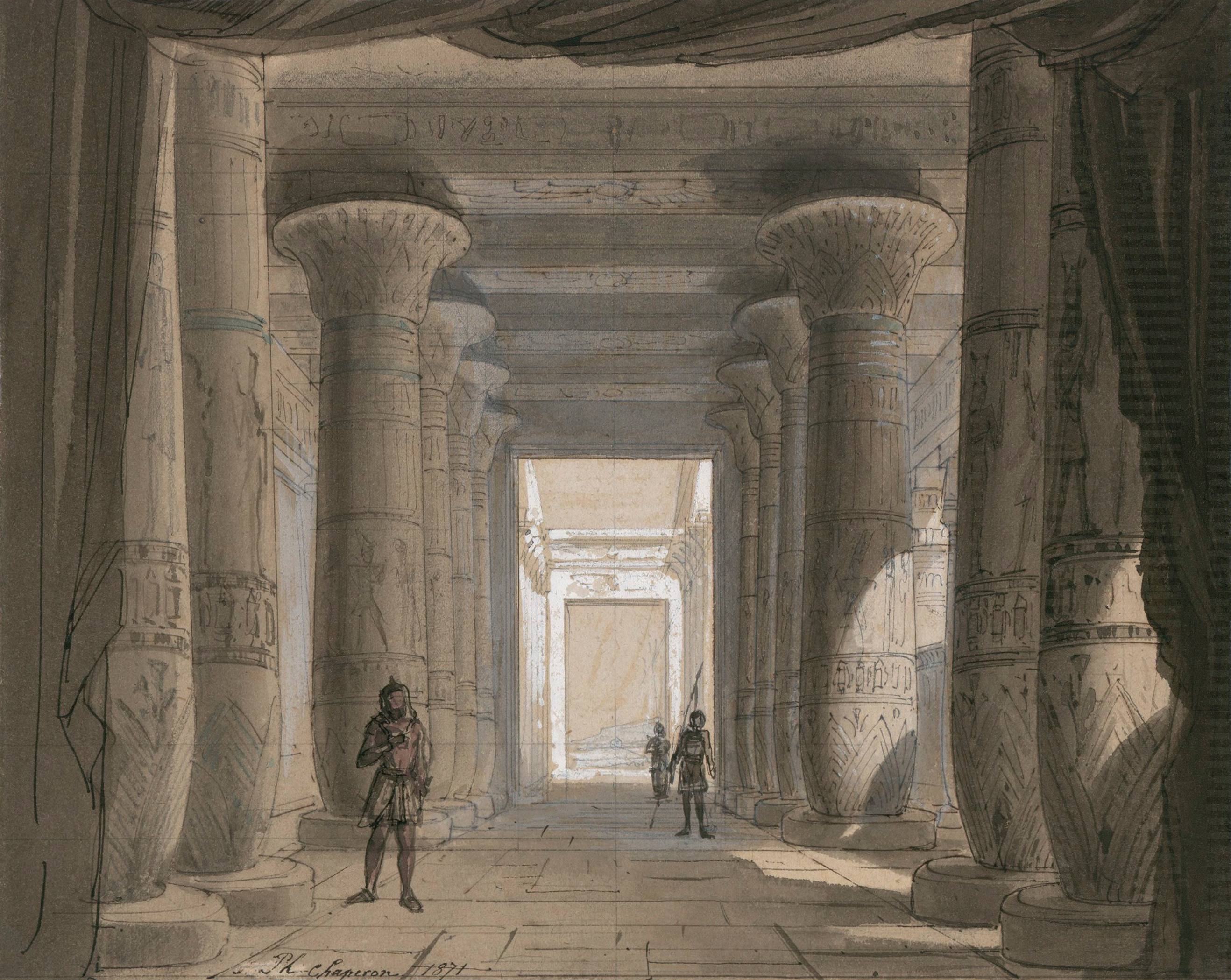
Aida première set design

== Events ==
- March 29 – The Royal Albert Hall is opened in London incorporating a grand organ by Henry Willis & Sons, the world's largest at this time, on which Anton Bruckner gives a series of recitals.
- Autumn – Charles Gounod begins a stay with soprano Georgina Weldon and her husband in London.
- December 24 – Giuseppe Verdi's opera Aida premières at the Khedivial Opera House in Cairo.
- December 26 – The Victorian burlesque Thespis, first of the Gilbert and Sullivan light opera collaborations, premières at the Gaiety Theatre, London. It does modestly well, but the two composers will not again work together until 1875.
- Asger Hamerik becomes musical director of the Peabody Institute in Baltimore, Maryland.
- Ernesto Köhler leaves Vienna following the advice of Cesare Ciardi for a position at the Imperial Ballet in St. Petersbrg.

== Published popular music ==
- "The Blue and the Gray" by James W. Long
- "Good Bye, Liza Jane" (anon)
- "The Little Church Around The Corner" w.m. Charles A. White
- "The Little Old Log Cabin In The Lane" w.m. William S. Hays
- "Mollie Darling" w.m. William S. Hays
- "Oh aint I got the Blues!" by A.A. Chapman
- "Onward, Christian Soldiers" w. Rev. Sabine Baring-Gould m. Sir Arthur Sullivan
- "Reuben and Rachel" w. Harry Birch m. William Gooch
- "Susan Jane" w.m. William S. Hays
- "The angels are calling me, Mother," words by Samuel N. Mitchell, music by William A. Huntley

== Classical music ==
- Georges Bizet – Jeux d'enfants
- Dudley Buck – Variations on a Scotch Air, Op.51
- Hans von Bülow – Il Carnevale di Milano, Op.21
- Peter Cornelius – Chorgesänge
- Charles Gounod – Boléro, CG 354
- Stephen Heller – Freischütz Studien, Op.127
- Adolf Jensen – 12 Lieder aus Joseph Victor Scheffels Gaudeamus, Op.40
- Jules Massenet
  - Dialogue nocturne
  - Le roman d'Arlequin
  - Rêvons, c'est l'heure
  - Scènes hongroises, premiered November 26 in Paris
- Karl Matys – 4 Solostücke, Op.15
- Olivier Métra
  - Espérance Waltz
  - La vague
- Johann Rufinatscha
  - 6 Charakterstücke, Op.14
  - Fantasie in B major for piano, Op.15
- Camille Saint-Saëns – Romance, Op. 37
- Eduard Strauss – Fesche Geister, Op.75
- Johann Strauss, Jr.
  - Indigo-Quadrille, Op.344
  - Tausend und eine Nacht, Op.346
- Arthur Sullivan – The Merchant of Venice, premiered November 19 in Manchester
- Pyotr Ilyich Tchaikovsky – String Quartet No. 1 (Tchaikovsky)
- Robert Volkmann – Overture to Shakespeare's Richard III, Op.68

== Opera ==
- Giovanni Bottesini – Ali Baba premiered 18 January at the Lyceum in London
- Johann Strauss II – Indigo und die vierzig Räuber premiered February 10 in Vienna
- Richard Wagner – Siegfried completed February 1871; not premiered until 1876
- Jacques Offenbach – Boule-de-Neige premiered December 14 in Paris
- Giuseppe Verdi – Aida 24 December 1871 in Cairo

== Musical theatre ==
- Geneviève de Brabant, London production
- The Mascot, London production
- La Mascotte, Vienna production
- Le Roi Carotte, London production
- Thespis, London production

== Births ==
- March 1 – Ben Harney, American composer and ragtime pianist (d. 1938)
- March 4 – Henri Delépine, composer (d. 1956)
- March 8 – Gaston Borch, composer (d. 1926)
- March 12 – Helene Wiet, Austrian opera singer (d. 1939)
- April 21 – Leo Blech, German conductor and composer (d. 1958)
- May 7 – Paolo Litta, Italian composer (d. 1931)
- May 30 – Harry Macdonough, Canadian-American singer and music executive (d. 1931)
- June 17 – James Weldon Johnson, African American songwriter, author, diplomat and educator (d. 1938)
- June 29 – Luisa Tetrazzini, Italian soprano (d. 1940)
- July 10 – Franz Evers, lyricist and music publisher (d. 1947)
- August 1 – Oskar Fried, composer (d. 1941)
- August 16 – Zacharia Paliashvili, Georgian composer (d. 1933)
- December 20 – Henry Kimball Hadley, American composer (d. 1937)

== Deaths ==
- January 4 – Vincent Adler, pianist and composer (b. 1826)
- February 1 – Alexander Serov, composer and music critic (b. 1820)
- February 7 – Henry E. Steinway, German-American piano manufacturer (b. 1797)
- February 11 – Filippo Taglioni, dancer and choreographer (b. 1777)
- March 26 – François-Joseph Fétis, composer and musicologist (b. 1784)
- April 27 – Sigismond Thalberg, pianist and composer (b. 1812)
- May 12 – Daniel Auber, composer (born 1782)
- May 26 – Aimé Maillart, composer (b. 1817)
- July 17 – Karl Tausig, pianist and composer (b. 1841) (typhoid)
- July 20 – François Delsarte, singer and music teacher (b. 1811)
- August 12 – Tiyo Soga, composer of hymns (b. 1829)
- September 3 – Václav Emanuel Horák, church musician and composer (b. 1800)
- September 26 – Cipriani Potter, pianist and composer (b. 1792)
- December 12 – Henrik Rung, composer (b. 1807)
- John Edward Pigot, music collector (b. 1822)
- Fernando Quijano, songwriter, composer of the Uruguayan national anthem (b. 1805)
