= Egressy =

Egressy is a surname. Notable people with the surname include:

- Béni Egressy (1814–1851), Hungarian composer, librettist, translator, and actor
- Gábor Egressy (1808–1866), Hungarian actor
- Gábor Egressy (born 1974), Hungarian footballer
