= Valéria Csányi =

Hungarian conductor

Valéria Csányi (born 2 October 1958) is a Hungarian conductor.

She obtained a music teacher and coral conductor diploma in 1982 and a conductor's diploma in 1984 at Liszt Academy of Music. She attended master courses by Karl Österreicher in Vienna, Péter Eötvös in Szombathely and Milan Horvat in Salzburg.

Since 1983 she has been a member of the Hungarian State Opera, initially as a répétiteur. During her tutorial work she coached the choir and soloists for almost the complete repertoire of the Opera. She got the opportunity to conduct operas in 1988, with several pieces given to her, and she also conducted premiers. She first conducted a ballet performance in 1995, the Nutcracker, which she has conducted for more than 150 times since then.

Between 1995 and 2009 she took part in all ballet productions of the Opera. For a long time she was the most fully employed conductor of the Opera, where she conducted about 700 performances. She toured Austria, Germany, Poland, Spain, Sweden and Mexico. She made a CD recording of Johann Strauss Jr’s operetta Fürstin Ninetta with the Stockholm Strauss Orkester for Naxos Records as well as the first complete recording of Ferenc Erkel’s opera István király. She is just working on the complete orchestral music of Leo Weiner.
