= Hunyadi László (opera) =

Opera by Ferenc Erkel

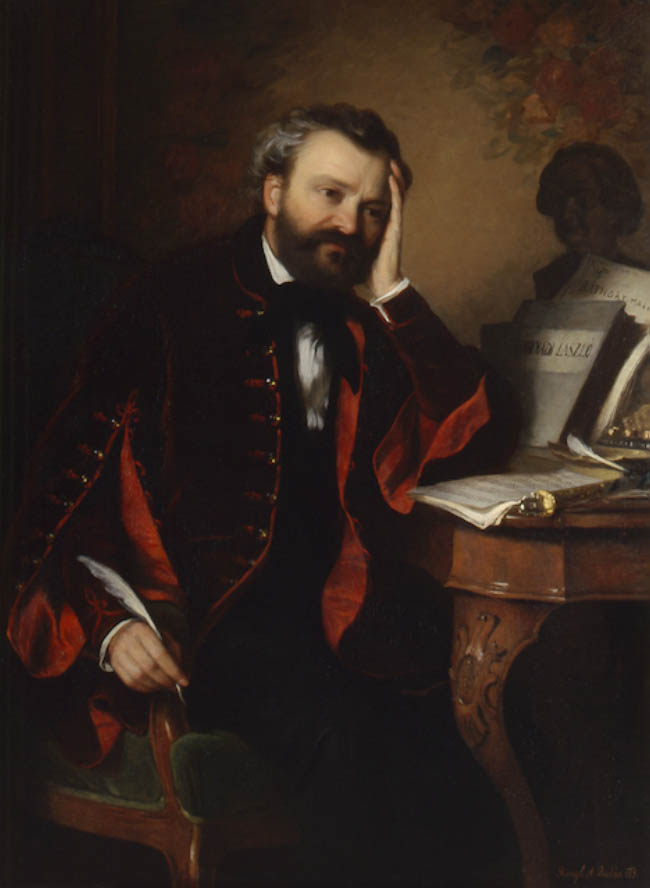
1850s painting of Erkel by Alajos Györgyi Giergl

Hunyadi László (László Hunyadi) is an opera in three, originally four acts by the Hungarian composer Ferenc Erkel. The libretto, by Béni Egressy, is based on the play Két László by Lőrinc Tóth. The opera was first performed at the Pesti Nemzeti Magyar Szinház, Budapest on 27 January 1844. Hunyadi László is considered to be the first important Hungarian opera and Erkel's musical style draws on folk influences, particularly the dance known as the verbunkos.

The opera was reworked in 1935 by Kálmán Nádasdy, Gusztáv Oláh and Miklós Radnai, which is what is usually performed today. This rework changed the libretto almost completely, switched around and even removed some parts, shortening the piece by about 15-20 minutes.

== Roles ==
Role	Voice type	Premiere Cast, 27 January 1844 (Conductor: - )
László V King of Hungary	tenor	Mihály Havi
Erzsébet Szilágyi widow of János Hunyadi	soprano	Rozália Klein Schodel
László Hunyadi her son	tenor	Adolf Pecz
Mátyás Hunyadi László's brother	mezzo-soprano	Lujza Éder
Miklós Gara the count palatine	bass-baritone	Miklós Udvarhelyi
Mária his daughter	soprano	Leopoldina Molnár
Ulrik Cillei the regent	bass	Mihály Füredy
Rozgonyi an army officer	baritone	Benjámin Egressy

== Synopsis ==
The opera is based on events which took place in Hungary in 1456-7. The great military leader, János Hunyadi, who defended Hungary against the attacks of the Ottoman Turks is dead and power has passed to his enemies. The foreign king, László V, is weak.

=== Act 1 ===
László Hunyadi's soldiers oppose letting the foreign king and his mercenaries into the castle since they do not trust him. They advise László against granting entry for them to the castle. He dismisses this. Meanwhile, a messenger is caught. He was carrying a letter that promises the heads of the Hunyadis to György Brankovics, the Serbian Despot, written by Ulrik Cillei, the king's stepfather, Croatian viceroy and acting king. László's soldiers are outraged, but they are interrupted by the king's arrival. Cillei immediately accuses László of treason, which László refutes by offering to hand the castle's keys to the king. The king does not take the keys as he believes they are best kept in László's hands. The king's German mercenaries arrive. The castle guards close the drawbridge before them and command them to leave, the guards can defend the castle themselves.

When King László V is informed about what happened, he is startled. Cillei convinces him to hand over the ring that symbolises power so he can "clear" Hunyadi out of the way. László Hunyadi is daydreaming about his fiancée Mária, when he is interrupted by Rozgonyi. He reveals that Cillei wanted him to join the conspiracy against László. László alerts his followers who hide in the chamber. Cillei enters and tells László that the king has invited him to a dinner. László confronts Cillei, saying he knows about the conspiracy. The regent pulls out a dagger and attempts to stab László, but László's followers kill Cillei before he can do any harm. The king arrives and is horrified by Cillei's dead body. He excuses László under the pressure, but curses him nonetheless.

=== Act 2 ===
László's mother, Erzsébet and her ladies are waiting for the king's arrival. Erzsébet, not convinced about the king genuinely excusing László and still worrying for his life, has a vision about him being executed and she faints. Her ladies wake her up and reassure her that the vision was just a nightmare. The king arrives. Erzsébet begs him to have mercy on her son. The king, referring to János Hunyadi's heroic deeds, promises to pardon László. Meanwhile, he notices Mária and falls in love with her. Miklós Gara, Mária's father, comes up with a plan upon seeing this: he will give his daughter's hand to the king instead of László Hunyadi, reassuring his position of power. The king requests the presence of the two Hunyadis, so he can pardon them. Erzsébet is worried again but is reassured when her sons return. The king publicly vows not to avenge Cilley's death and accepts László and Mátyás as his brothers and Erzsébet as his mother.

=== Act 3 ===
The king is daydreaming about Mária. Gara appears and tells the king that he will give Mária's hand to him. The king asks about Hunyadi, to which Gara replies that he is not worthy of Mária. He falsely accuses Hunyadi László of planning on assassinating the king. The king, infuriated by this, sends Gara to arrest Hunyadi. In one revision of the opera, Gara's recitative is placed at the end of this scene and has different text more about his plans to take the throne and his success in convincing the king.

At the wedding of Mária and László, Mária sings about her overwhelming joy. The joy doesn't last long, however, as Gara and his soldiers arrive to arrest László.

=== Act 4 ===
László is lamenting his innocence in his cell. Suddenly, the cell door opens and Mária steps in. She bribed the guards and tries to convince László to flee with her, but he trusts in the king's vow and stays. Gara arrives and is infuriated when he finds out that Mária was let into László's jail cell. Mária begs her father to spare László but is unsuccessful.

A wild storm is raging at the place of the execution. Erzsébet begs God to save her son. The executioner strikes three times to no avail, at which point László should be spared. The crowd shouts for mercy. Gara, however, instructs the executioner to strike again. László's head falls to the ground.

In revisions, Act 4 is merged into Act 3.

== Recordings ==
- There exists a famous recording of the aria "Nagy ég ..." (known as the La Grange aria, because it was written in honor of the soprano Anna de La Grange) made by the great American dramatic soprano Lillian Nordica in 1907, for Columbia Records. This particularly brilliant example of Nordica's singing has been reissued on CD by Marston Records (number 52027-2) and other labels.
- Simándy József (Hunyadi László), Szabó Miklós, Faragó András, Szönyi Olga, Jámbor LásLó, Orosz Júlia, Déry Gabriella, Bódy József, Pálffy Endre, Petri Miklós, The Choir of the Hungarian Radio, The Choir of the Hungarian Army Central Ensemble, The Orchestra of the Budapest Philharmonic Society (recorded date: June 29-July 9, 1960, by Qualiton).
- Hunyadi László András Molnár, Istvan Gáti, Sylvia Sass, Dénes Gulyás, Hungarian State Opera and Chorus, conducted by J. Kovács (Hungaroton, 1985).
- Hunyadi László (ősváltozat) Attila Fekete, Beatrix Fodor, Erika Miklósa, Gabriella Balga, Gábor Bretz, Dániel Pataky, Krisztián Cser, Károly Fekete, Honvéd Male Choir, Orchestra of the Hungarian State Opera, conducted by Domonkos Héja (2012). This is the "original" version (the final version that Erkel worked on, completed in 1862)

== Sources ==
- The Viking Opera Guide ed. Holden (Viking, 1993)
- Del Teatro (in Italian)
- Casaglia, Gherardo (2005). "Hunyadi László, 27 January 1844". L'Almanacco di Gherardo Casaglia (in Italian).
- The Oxford Illustrated History of Opera ed. Parker (OUP, 1994)
