= Róza Schodel =

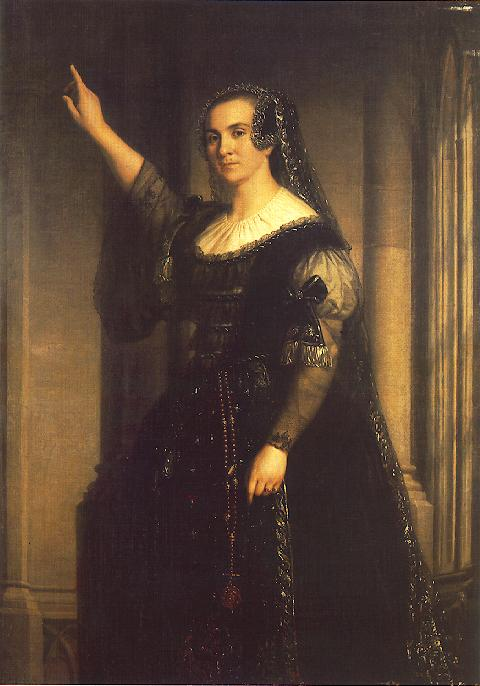
- Schodel as Elizabeth Szilágyi, portrait by Miklós Barabás
- Born: 29 September 1811; Klausenburg, Austrian Empire
- Died: 19 August 1854 (aged 42); Nyáregyháza, Kingdom of Hungary, Austrian Empire
- Occupation: Opera singer
- Spouse: János Schodel

Rozália Schodel (29 September 1811 – 19 August 1854) was a Hungarian soprano. Her most prominent role was the creation of Elizabeth Szilágyi in Ferenc Erkel's Hunyadi László.

== Life ==
She was born on 29 September 1811 in Klausenburg in the Austrian Empire (present-day Cluj-Napoca, Romania). Of illegitimate birth, she was adopted by musician János Klein. She studied under János Schodel, whom she married in 1826.

She made her opera debut in Pressburg (now Bratislava) in 1829 as Agathe in Carl Maria von Weber's Der Freischütz. From 1833 to 1836 she performed at the Kärntnertortheater in Vienna.

Starting in 1837, she performed in Pest, first at the Magyar Theatre, then at the National Theatre. At one of Franz Liszt's recitals in 1839, he accompanied Schodel on the piano as she sang Ludwig van Beethoven's "Adelaide" and Franz Schubert’s "Gretchen am Spinnnrad". Roles she performed in Pest included Lucia in Lucia di Lammermoor by Gaetano Donizetti, Linda in Linda di Chamounix by Gaetano Donizetti, Norma in Norma by Vincenzo Bellini, Lady Macbeth in H.-A. Chélard’s Macbeth, and Leonore in Fidelio by Ludwig van Beethoven.

She left Pest in 1840 after an ovation where an onion wreath was thrown at her feet, touring all over Europe. She returned in 1843 and performed her most important role in 1844, as Elizabeth Szilágyi in Ferenc Erkel's Hunyadi László.

Róza Schodel retired in 1843. She died on 19 August 1854 in Nyáregyháza.
