= József Simándy =

Hungarian tenor with German origins (1916–1997)

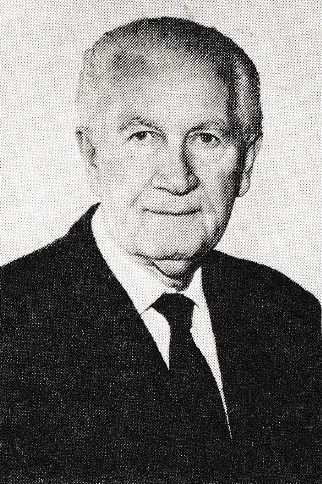
By Gyula Koós (1990)

József Simándy (Kistarcsa, 18 September 1916 – Budapest, 4 March 1997) was a Hungarian tenor with German origins. His name in Hungarian form is Simándy József, his original family name is Schulder. A student of Emilia Posszert, he joined the chorus of the Hungarian State Opera in 1940; in 1946, he made his debut as Don José in Carmen in Szeged. In 1947, he returned to the Budapest Opera, where he was the leading heroic tenor until 1984. He performed regularly in Munich as well, from 1956 until 1960. Besides heroic tenor roles, Simándy took on lyric and spinto parts as well; he was best known for his Radames, Lohengrin, and Otello. Recordings include two operas by Ferenc Erkel, Bánk bán and Hunyadi László, in both of which he sang the title role.
