= György Dózsa (opera) =

Opera by Ferenc Erkel

- Opera by Ferenc Erkel
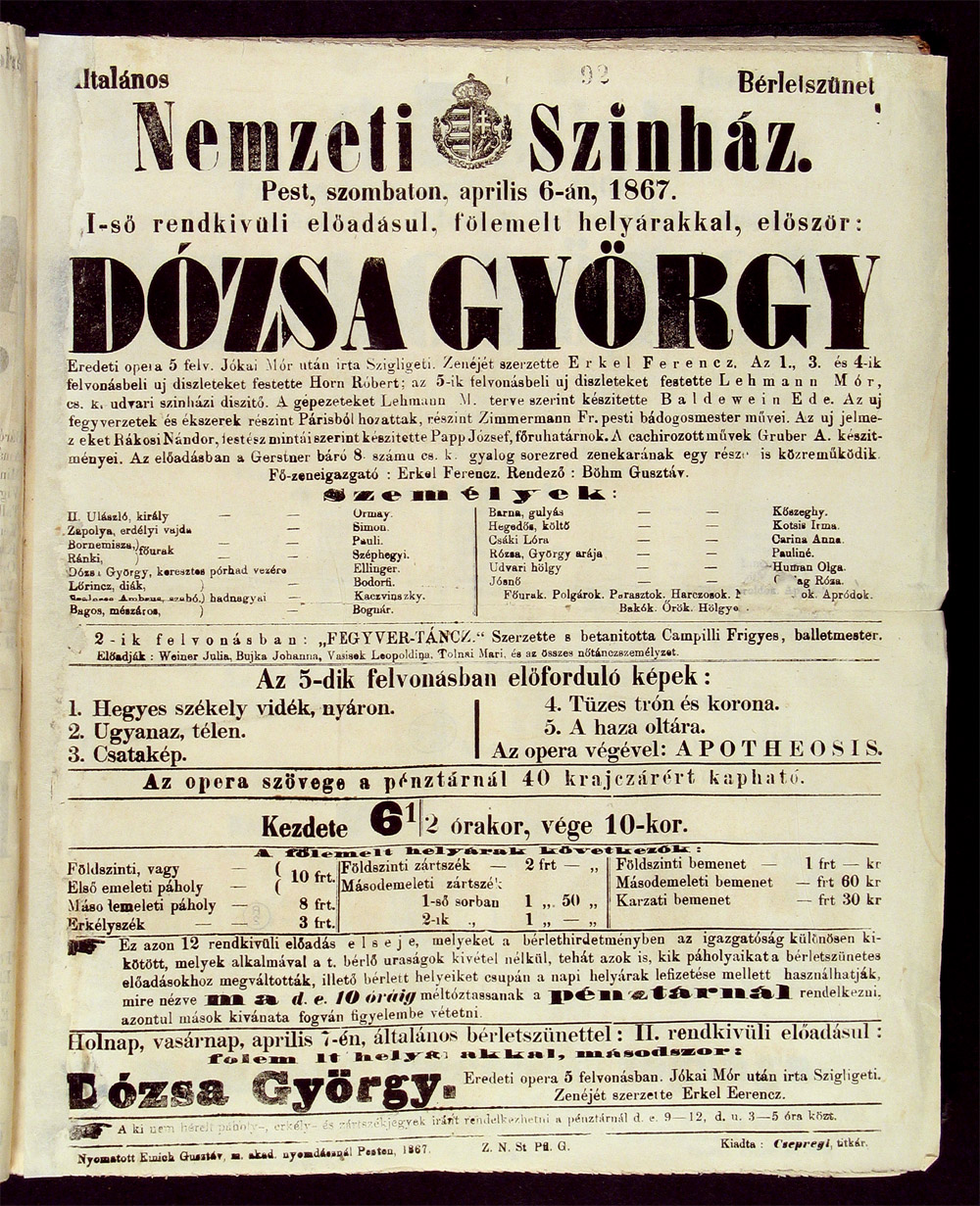
- Advertisement of the opera's premiere.
- Librettist: Ede Szigligeti
- Language: Hungarian
- Premiere: 6 April 1867; National Theatre (Budapest)

Dózsa György is an 1867 Hungarian opera in five acts by Ferenc Erkel. It is a dramatisation of the life of late mediaeval peasant revolt leader György Dózsa. Its libretto, by Ede Szigligeti, was based on Mór Jókai's tragedy of the same name.

== Production history ==
Dózsa György premiered on 6 April 1867 in the National Theatre of Pest, with Erkel conducting. It was performed only six times, and was unsuccessful with audiences, despite the production being reworked multiple times. This might have resulted from Erkel's 'partiality' towards the revolting peasants, as he still believed in the principles of the Revolution of 1848, whereas popular attitudes were more critical of them after the country's compromise with Austria that ended military dictatorship in Hungary and established a dual monarchy. Compared to his previous works, the music of György Dózsa features less music in the style of Hungarian folk songs and signalled a shift in Erkel's style, possibly as a result of the growing involvement of his sons, Sándor and Gyula Erkel.

== Characters ==
- King Ulászló II
- Voivode Zápolya of Transylvania
- Bornemisza, a lord
- Ránki, another lord
- Hegedős, a poet
- György Dózsa, commander of the crusader peasant army
- Lőrincz, a student, Dózsa's officer
- Ambrus Szaleres, a tailor, Dózsa's officer
- Bagos, a butcher, Dózsa's officer
- Barna, a gulyás
- Lóra Csáky/Csáki
- Rózsa, bride of György
- a lady, Lóra's friend
- a fortune-teller woman
- lords, burghers, peasants, soldiers, folks, heralds, pages, executioners, guards, ladies

== Synopsis ==
The opera dramatises the revolt led by György Dózsa and his downfall. It starts with King Ulászló (Vladislaus II of Hungary) ennobling Dózsa for his valiance to the dismay of his lords. Tensions rise further when Dózsa falls in love with Lóra Csáky, a young noblewoman. At the same time, his bride Rózsa and his friend Barna come from their ancestral village, reminding Dózsa of his origins. However, he has become more ambitious than them. He learns that one of the lords, John Zápolya, is harassing Rózsa and was responsible for his mother's death. He vows to take revenge.

The Beginning of Dózsa's Oath, Aria from Act One

I, György Dózsa, now take a bold oath with my people,
Who cultivate the sacred soil of my homeland,
That I ever expected all blessings from this land,
The people likewise place all their fervent faith in it,
Only to this sacred ground are our lives bound,
A whole world is this precious land to us:
Our mother, our homeland, and our sweet everything!

The lords are feasting with the King, but Lóra is worried for the fate of the country and the commoners. She insults the lords by saying that there is 'only one man in the country', the leader of the crusade, Dózsa. Incenced, the nobles go to punish Dózsa for his perceived social climbing. Zápolya tears the cross symbolising his role in the holy war from Dózsa's chest. He fights back, and the peasants defeat the nobles in the ensuing conflict.

A fortune-teller comes to the camp and prophesies 'a throne and a crown' for Dózsa, but he is preoccupied with the fact that his followers had captured Lóra. When the time comes for him to pass judgment on the captives, he lets everyone go but retains Lóra as a hostage. The peasants do not understand this, and Barna tells them of Dózsa's love for the noblewoman. They decide to kill her, but are overheard by Rózsa. Understanding that Dózsa 'can never be hers', she feels that she has nothing to live for. She rescues Lóra by switching places with her in exchange for a promise that Lóra will save Dózsa if necessary. At night, Barna stabs Rózsa to death. Dózsa is enraged, but when he discovers who was the real victim, he only mounrs in silence. Shortly after, the army of the lords attacks them.

Dózsa is captured. Lóra visits him in prison and offers to rescue him, but Dózsa is 'ready to face his fate'. The prophecy of the fortune-teller is fulfilled: he is sat on a burning throne and crowned with a re-dhot crown. As he dies, he sees a vision of Rózsa and angels receiving him into heaven.

== Sources ==
- Till Géza: Opera, Zeneműkiadó, Budapest, 1985, ISBN 963-330-564-0
- Winkler Gábor: Barangolás az operák világában, Tudomány Kiadó, Budapest, 2005, ISBN 963-8194-41-3
