= Bánk bán =

Opera by Ferenc Erkel

- Opera by Ferenc Erkel
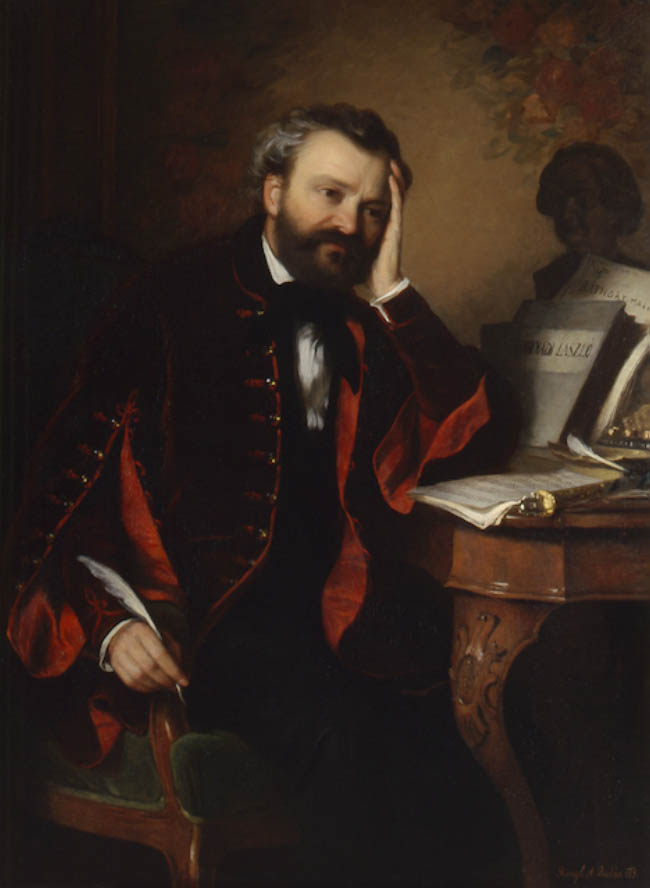
- Portrait of Erkel by Alajos Györgyi Giergl, 1850
- Librettist: Béni Egressy
- Language: Hungarian
- Based on: life of Gertrude of Merania
- Premiere: 9 March 1861; Pesti Nemzeti Magyar Szinház, Pest

Bánk bán is an opera in 3 acts by composer Ferenc Erkel. The work uses a Hungarian-language libretto by Béni Egressy which is based on a stage play of the same name by József Katona. (Bán is ban in English, similar to a viceroy, a duke or palatine.) The main storyline is based on the assassination of Queen Gertrude, wife of Andrew II in 1213. The opera was first performed at the Pesti Nemzeti Magyar Szinház in Pest on 9 March 1861.

== Roles ==
Roles, voice types, premiere cast
Role	Voice type	Premiere cast, 9 March 1861 Conductor: Ferenc Erkel
II. Endre (Andrew II), King of Hungary	baritone or bass-baritone	Louis von Bignio
Gertrude, his queen	mezzo-soprano	Zsófia Hofbauer
Otto, Gertrude's brother, [son of Berthold IV]	tenor	Albert Telek
Bánk bán, the viceroy	tenor	József Ellinger
Melinda, his wife	soprano	Cornélia Hollósy
Petur bán, leader of the nobles	baritone	Karóly Köszeghy
Tiborc, a peasant	baritone	Mihály Füredy
Biberach, knight-errant	baritone or bass-baritone	
A royal officer	tenor	
Flag bearer	baritone	

== Synopsis ==
Setting: Hungary in the year 1213

=== Act 1 ===
King Endre II, the monarch of the country, is fighting abroad while Gertrude, his queen, who is of Meranian birth, plays hostess to the leading members of the Court (in the first place foreigners) at prodigal feasts. Bán Bánk, the king's deputy, is touring the poverty-ridden country while Otto, the Queen's younger brother, is trying to seduce Bánk's beautiful wife Melinda. A group of angry Magyar nobles headed by Bán Petur are plotting a conspiracy against the queen, anxious for the fate of their homeland and the honour of Bánk's wife. Petur has sent for Bánk, hoping to recruit him for their cause. The Bán arrives, but is outraged that his old friend would dare threaten the throne. When Petur informs him of Otto's advances toward Melinda, however, Bánk promises that he shall attend their meeting.

=== Act 2 ===
Bánk, distraught, prays over his nation and his good name. On the porch of the castle of Visegrád, Tiborc, an old peasant, tells Bánk about the desperate poverty of the entire country, a grave consequence of the wasteful extravagance of the foreigners, but Bánk is so overcome by the tragedy of his own position that he listens only halfheartedly. It is revealed that Tiborc, a vassal of the Bán, saved his life at a battle long ago; Bánk promises his aid. Otto, encouraged by the Queen's open approval, attempts to seduce Melinda, without success. He drugs and rapes her. The desperate woman staggers to her husband half insane with shame. In his bitter grief Bánk blasts a terrible curse at his own son, but then raises to himself the innocent little boy, giving solace to his wife. Finally, he asks Tiborc to escort Melinda and their little son to their home, a castle in East Hungary, beyond the River Tisza.

In the throne-room Bánk calls the Queen to account for plunging the country into poverty and for the honour of his betrayed wife. Gertrude counters him with contemptuous scorn and draws a dagger. Bánk wrests the dagger from her hand, and in the scuffle, she is fatally stabbed. Bánk laments over the actions he has been forced to take.

=== Act 3 ===
Tiborc reaches the bank of the Tisza River with Melinda and her little son. In a fit of insanity, Melinda throws herself into the waves together with her son, within view of the helpless old peasant.

Endre II returns. Standing by his queen's funeral bier, he calls to the nobles to account for the murder, who deny having had a part in the assault on the Queen. Bánk, however, admits that, convinced of her guilt which was known to all, he killed the Queen deliberately. King and Viceroy face each other with swords almost drawn when Tiborc arrives with the corpses of Melinda and the child. The sword drops from Bánk's grip, and he collapses over the bodies of his wife and son. The nobles and retainers pray for the repose of all the dead.

== Recordings ==
Year	Orchestra and conductor	Cast	Label
1956	Budapest Philharmonic Orchestra and Hungarian State Opera Chorus; Vilmos Komor (conductor)	László Jámbor, Rózsi Delly, László Külkei, József Joviczky, Júlia Osváth, Jánoz Fodor, György Melis, György Radnai, József Bódy, Miklós Tóth. Recorded at the Erkel Theatre.	LP: Qualiton HLPX 150-52 (three record set) (1956)
1969	Budapest Philharmonic Orchestra and Hungarian State Opera Chorus; János Ferencsik (conductor)	András Faragó, András Rajna, György Melis, László Palócz, Sándor Sólyom-Nagy, József Simándy, Karola Ágay, Erzsébet Komlóssy, József Réti, Imre Jóky	LP: Hungaroton LPX11376 – 78 (three record set) (1969); CD: DANACORD (two disc set) (1986)
1993	Hungarian Festival Chorus and Budapest Symphonists; Géza Oberfrank (conductor)	János Gurbán (II. Endre), Eva Marton (Gertrud), Tamás Daróczy (Ottó), András Molnár (Bánk Bán), Ingrid Kertesi (Melinda), István Gáti (Tiborc), Mihály Kálmándi (Petur Bán), Csaba Airizer (Biberach), Attila Fülöp (Royal officer), Pál Oberfrank (Ensign). Recorded 12–22 September 1993, Alpha Line Studio at the Italian Institute, Budapest	CD: Alpha Line Records ALR 005-07 (three-disc set)
2001	Orchestra of the Hungarian Millennium, Honvéd Men's Chorus, Hungarian National Chorus; Tamás Pál (conductor)	Kolos Kováts (The King of Hungary), Eva Marton (The Queen), Dénes Gulyás (Ottó, Prince of Meran), Atilla Kiss B. (Bánk Bán, Palatine of Hungary), Andrea Rost (his wife), Lajos Miller (Tiborc, a peasant), Sándor Sólyom-Nágy (Petur Bán, The Lord of Bihar), Attils Réti (Biberach, knight-adventurer), Bence Asztalos (Sólom Mester). Recorded 13–19 March 2001, Phoenix Studio, Budapest	CD: Warner Music Hungary 0927 44606 (two disc set)
2011	Hungarian State Opera Chorus and Orchestra; Domonkos Héja (conductor)	Tamás Busa, Gyöngyi Lukács, Attila Fekete, János Bándi, Ingrid Kertesi, Mihály Kálmándi, Csaba Szegedi, Béla Perencz, László Beöthy-Kiss	CD: Opera Studio MAO001 (three disc set)
