= George Branković =

George Branković may refer to:

- Đurađ Branković (1377–1456), Serbian prince and despot, reigned 1427–1456
- Đorđe Branković (1461–1516), Serbian titular despot 1486–1496
- Đorđe Branković (count) (1645–1711), Serbian nobleman
- Georgije Branković (1830–1907), Serbian Patriarch of Karlovci
- György Brankovics (opera), an 1874 Hungarian opera by Ferenc Erkel
