= Psalmus Hungaricus (Kodály) =

1923 choral work by Zoltán Kodály

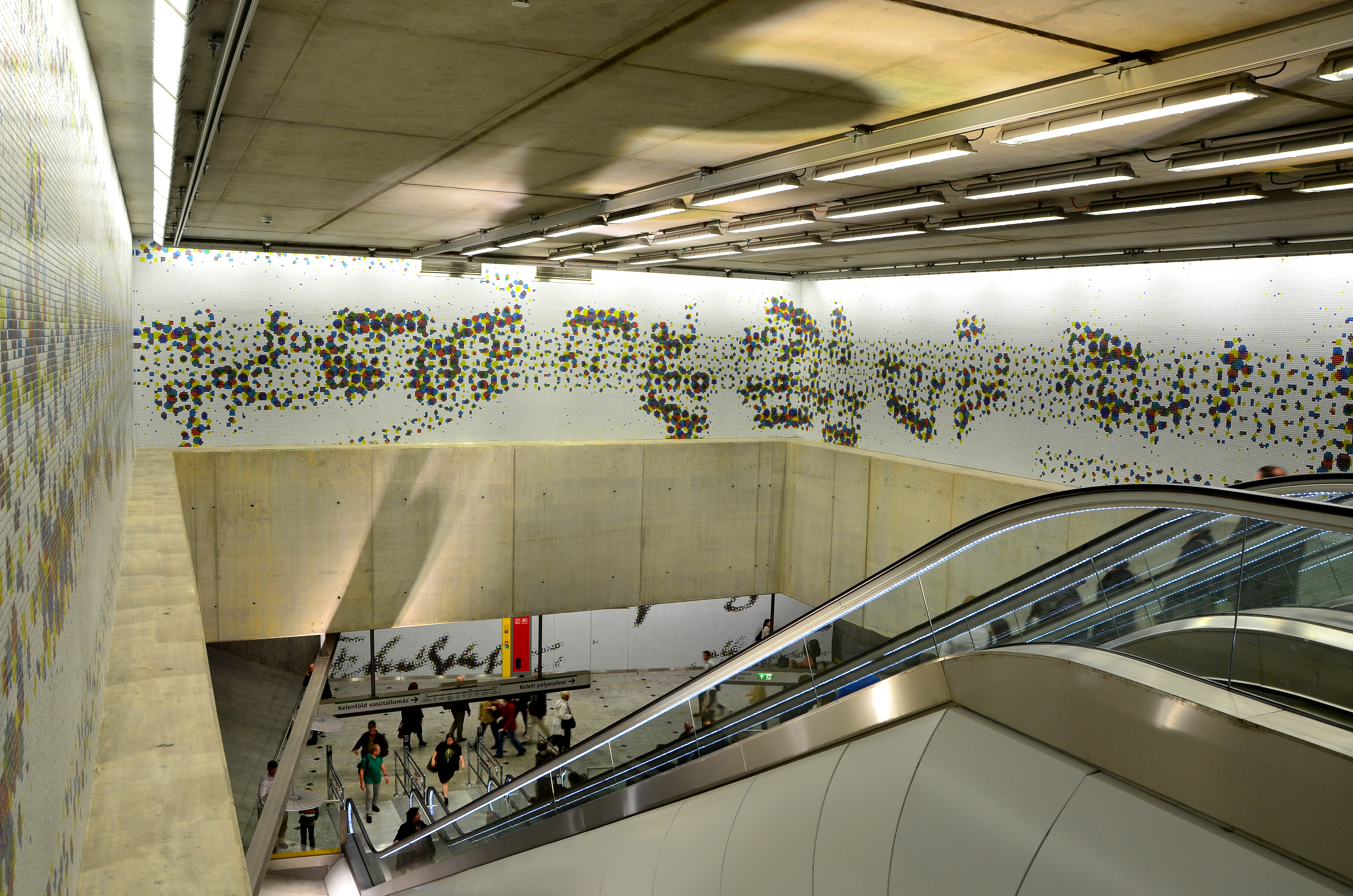
Mosaic depicting a detail of the score, at the Kálvin tér station of the Budapest Metro

Psalmus Hungaricus, Op. 13, is a choral work for tenor, chorus and orchestra by Zoltán Kodály, composed in 1923. It was commissioned for a gala performance celebrating the fiftieth anniversary of the unification of Buda, Pest and Óbuda on 19 November 1923, along with the Dance Suite by Béla Bartók, and the Festival Overture by Ernő Dohnányi, who conducted the concert. The work's first performance outside Hungary took place under Volkmar Andreae in Zurich on 18 June 1926, and increased Kodály's international recognition as a composer; he had been known primarily as an ethnomusicologist and music educator.

== Background ==
The text is based on the gloss of Psalm 55, "Give ear to my prayer, oh God", by 16th-century poet, preacher, and translator Mihály Vég. Uncommonly, Kodály chose a sacred text to mark a secular occasion; the libretto's passages of despair and call to God provide opportunities for the composer to address Hungary's tragic past and the loss of over 70% of its territory after the Trianon Treaty. The music reflects the nation's crisis during and after World War I (the partition of the Kingdom of Hungary), and the text draws a parallel between the sorrows of King David and the suffering endured by Hungarians under the Ottoman occupation. Thus, the Psalmus Hungaricus encompasses two and a half millennia of political distress.

== Description ==
At the beginning of the first movement, a terse orchestral prelude yields quickly to a brief subdued choral entry. The solo tenor follows closely with the rhapsodic aria, "Oh, that I had wings like a dove". After the first tenor solo section, the chorus responds with a brief, gentle passage, but the tenor reacts vehemently, indicting those sinners who plot the downfall of innocents. This provokes a wordless female choral lamentation, and their cries joined by the tenor's part propel the work to the climactic choral assertion that "God shall hear, and afflict them". A dramatic monologue sung by the tenor ensues, continuing nearly to the movement's finale, when the chorus erupts.

The second movement follows without a pause, in a contrasting pensive mood, featuring extended solos for clarinet and violin, over a shimmering undercurrent of harp and pizzicato strings. The tenor returns with a lyrical, yearning aria, "But reassure my heart", which combines fervor and tenderness.

The final movement primarily features the entire chorus, alternating sounds of martial bombast with words of defiance. The work ends with a hushed prayer.

Although Kodály never literally quotes Hungarian folk songs in Psalmus, he integrates folklike pentatonic motifs with plagal cadences that combine to make this music an intense national experience for generations of Hungarians.

== Discography ==
- Gabor Carelli, North Texas State College Chorus and Dallas Symphony Orchestra, Antal Doráti, cond., recorded 5 January 1949, RCA Victor DM 1331, issued May 1950; issued on CD by the Doráti Society, coupled with a Kodály rarity, Jesus and the Traders
- Ernst Haefliger, Radio Symphony Orchestra of Berlin, Ferenc Fricsay, cond., 1959 (Deutsche Grammophon) (in German).
- József Simándy, Musikaliska Sällskapet Chorus and Stockholm Philharmonic Orchestra, Antal Doráti, cond., live recording 16 December 1967, BIS CD 421–424, issued January 1988
- József Simándy, Hungarian State Radio Chorus and Hungarian State Orchestra, Antal Doráti, cond., recorded 24–27 September 1968 (Hungaroton).
- Lajos Kozma, Brighton Festival Chorus, London Symphony Orchestra, István Kertész, cond., 1970 (Decca).
- Janos B. Nagy, Hungarian Radio Chorus and Budapest Philharmonic Orchestra, Arpad Joó, cond., 1982 (Arts Music).
- Daroczy, Budapest Festival Orchestra, Sir Georg Solti, cond., 1998 (London).
- Nilsson, Raymond, London Philharmonic Orchestra & Chorus [Janos Ferencsik, Conductor], 1989 (Priceless CD D25335)(also Everest Records SDBR-3022)*
- Sir Charles Mackerras. Danish Radio Symphony Orchestra and Chorus.
