= Erzsébet Komlóssy =

- Born: 9 July 1933; Salgótarján, Hungary
- Died: 22 April 2014 (aged 80); Budapest, Hungary
- Education: Budapest Conservatory
- Occupation: Singer
- Years active: 1955–2007
- Children: 2
- Awards: Kossuth Prize; Commander's Cross of the Order of Merit of the Republic of Hungary

Erzsébet Komlóssy (9 July 1933 – 22 April 2014) was a Hungarian dramatic mezzo-soprano and contralto. She joined the National Theatre of Szeged and stayed there until 1958 before joining the Hungarian State Opera House as a private singer in 1958. Komlóssy performed almost all of the major alto and mezzo-soprano roles, approximately 60 roles until she left the company in 1974. She made her final stage appearance in 1986. Komlóssy was appointed the Hungarian State Opera House's singing master in 1988 and became its master artist in 2003. Komlóssy was a recipient of the Kossuth Prize and the Commander's Cross of the Order of Merit of the Republic of Hungary.

== Early life ==
Komlóssy was born on 9 July 1933 in Salgótarján, Hungary. Her father was a military officer and her mother was a nurse, and she was brought up in Lučenec and Salgótarján due to her father's military career. The family was not involved in music but Komlóssy began singing from a young age. Her abilities were noticed by the director of the Lučenec Theatre but her family did not want her signed to him. From age six, Komlóssy took piano lessons and learnt music at the Béla Bartók Secondary School of Music under the tutelage of the voice teacher Géza László. She then studied at the Budapest Conservatory.

== Career ==
Following the completion of her studies, in 1955, Komlóssy joined the National Theatre of Szeged and stayed there until 1958. Her debut stage appearance was as the Háziasszony (housewife) in Zoltán Kodály's opera Székely fonó. Komlóssy joined the Hungarian State Opera House as a private singer on 1 March 1958 and remained there until 1974, having already appeared with the company in Giuseppe Verdi's Un ballo in maschera in 1956 at age 23. She also had the role of Olga in Pyotr Ilyich Tchaikovsky's operatic version of Eugene Onegin.

While at the Hungarian State Opera House, Komlóssy performed almost all of the major alto and mezzo-soprano roles, singing almost 60 roles. She had parts in the premieres of Sándor Szokolay's Blood Wedding as the Mother of the Groom and as Gertrude in his adaption of Hamlet. Komlóssy also appeared in various guest roles in several opera houses abroad. These included Athens, Berlin, Bologna, Bucharest, Cologne, Edinburgh, Graz, Hamburg, Kyiv, Leningrad, London, Milan, Moscow, Prague, Rome, Sofia, Vienna, Wiesbaden, Zagreb. Komlóssy's only visit to the Royal Opera House was as Azucena in the 1970 revival of the Visconti production of Il trovatore, which also featured Leontyne Price as Leonora. She appeared as the Mother of the Groom at the 1973 Edinburgh Festival, when the Hungarian State Opera performed Blood Wedding. In 1974, Komlóssy portrayed Queen Gertrude in the television version of Ferenc Erkel's opera Bánk bán.

She sang in Georges Bizet's opera Carmen almost 300 times, and was also Örzsé in Zoltán Kodály's Háry János. Komlóssy also performed in the comedies Mrs. Quickly in Verdi's Falstaff and as Zita's mother in Giacomo Puccini's Gianni Schicchi. She performed on several occasions as an oratorio singer, was featured in several complete opera radio recordings including those of Erkel and Kodály and recorded several albums. Komlóssy's final stage performance was as Gertrude in Bánk bán at the Erkel Theatre in 1988.

In 1988, she was appointed the Hungarian State Opera House's singing master and was elected a permanent member of the theatre in 1991. In 2003. Komlóssy became a Master Artist of the Hungarian State Opera House and in 2007, was appointed a permanent member of the Society of Immortals based on the audience's votes. Her students included the likes of Erika Miklósa, Erika Gál and András Palerdi.

== Personal life ==
She was divorced and had two children. In 2013, Komlóssy contracted pneumonia, and died in Budapest on 22 April 2014.

== Recognition ==
She received numerous awards for her career. Komlóssy was a recipient of the Franz Liszt Prize in 1964, and the Székely Mihály commemorative plaquette in 1967. She earned the Kossuth Prize in 1975, the Meritorius Artist of Hungary in 1982, and the Commander's Cross of the Order of Merit of the Republic of Hungary in 1994. A season ticket for the Zenthe Ferenc Theatre, Salgótarján was named for her.
