= Gábor Egressy =

Gábor Egressy may refer to:

- Gábor Egressy (footballer) (born 1974), Hungarian football player
- Gábor Egressy (actor) (1808–1866), Hungarian actor
