= Bátori Mária =

1840 Hungarian opera by Ferenc Erkel

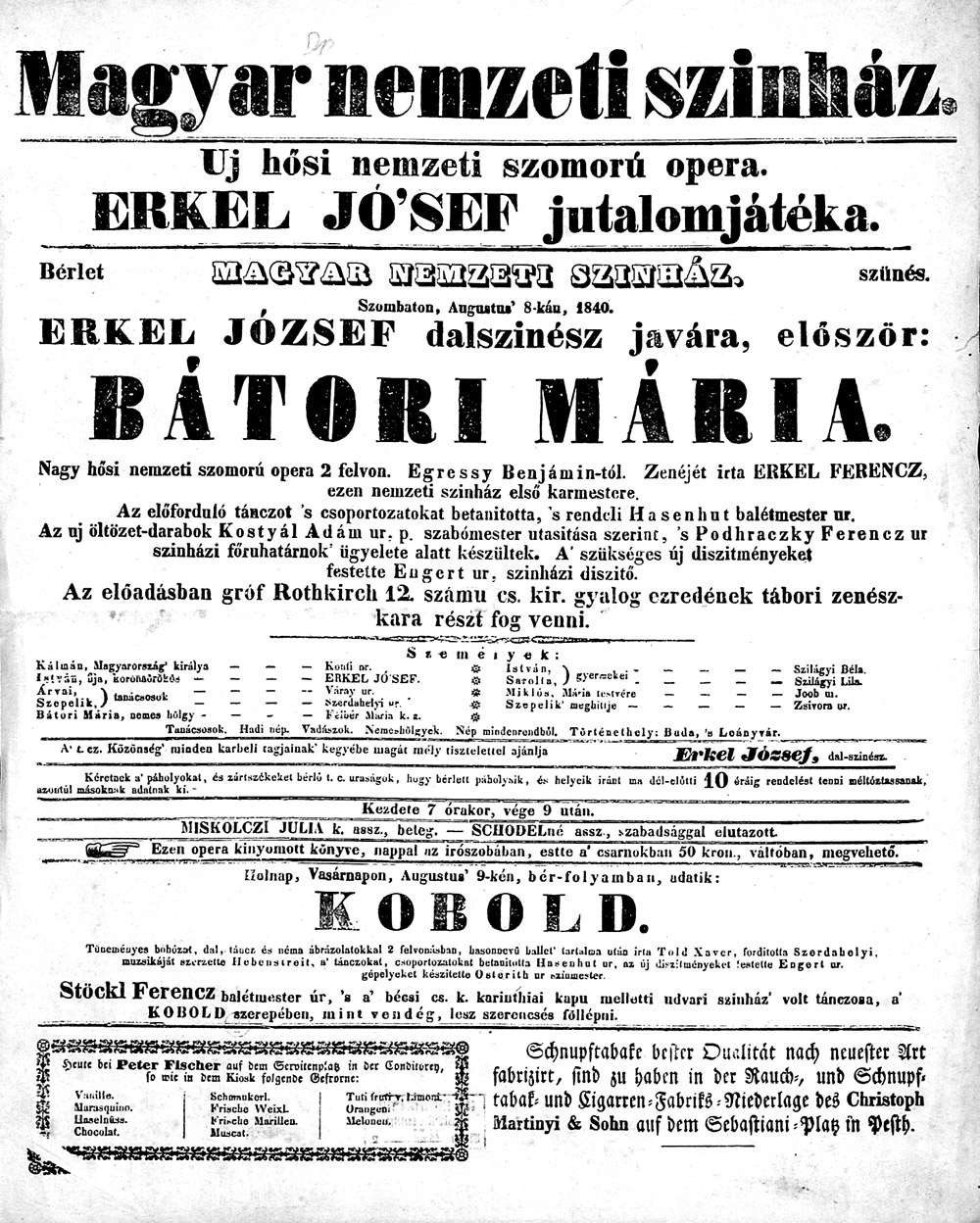
Poster for the premiere

Bátori Mária is an opera in two acts by Ferenc Erkel, to a Hungarian libretto by Béni Egressy. It was Erkel's first opera, premiering in 1840.

The opera is based on the stage play of the same name by András Dugonics (1794). The National Theatre, Pest, premiered the opera on 8 August 1840, soon after Erkel had joined the company.

The plot of Bátori Mária is based indirectly on the tragic story of Inês de Castro, the lover and posthumously recognized wife of King Peter I of Portugal.

== Roles ==
Roles and voice types
Role	Voice type
Kálmán, king of Hungary	bass
István, his son, heir to the throne	tenor
Árvai, a royal advisor	bass
Szepelik, a royal advisor	bass
Bátori Mária, a noblewoman	soprano
Miklós, Mária's brother	tenor
Messenger	tenor or bass
Szepelik's confidant, a spy	bass
Executioner	bass

== Plot ==
- Location: Hungary (Buda and Leányvár)
- Time: 12th century

=== Act 1 ===
King Kálmán and his court are preparing for the reception of Prince István, the royal heir returning from a victorious battle. However, the king's two chief advisors are in trouble, as they are afraid of the strong-handed and determined son coming to the throne, and fear for their place in the royal court. When István arrives, his father informs him it is time to remarry, as his first wife Judit has died. The prince – to the outrage of his father – does not wish to marry again purely out of his father's interest. The advisors take advantage of the situation and reveal that the prince has a lover, Bátori Mária, from whom he already has two sons. The king is infuriated. István, with his knights, leaves for his estate in Leányvár where his lover is waiting for him. Szepelik assigns his spy to inform him of the prince's every move. Meanwhile, Mária is saddened as she hasn't heard from István in a long time. To her joy, the prince arrives and proposes to her. At first, Mária is reluctant, as she knows the dislike for her in the court, but eventually she says yes, and the wedding is held on the spot.

=== Act 2 ===
Mária is tormented by sinister premonitions, but István and the lady's brother, Miklós, go hunting despite Mária's pleas, leaving the new wife defenceless. In Buda, the advisors convince the king to execute Mária, since the two illegitimate sons born of an unworthy marriage are not of Árpád's blood, so they would only be usurpers. The king leaves for Leányvár to question Mária. Meanwhile, in the forest, István is tormented by sinister premonitions among the merry party, so he heads home. The king arrives with his advisors and the executioner and orders Mária before him. The lady answers the king's questions and denies the accusations. The king is adamant, though Mária exposes the advisors: one was rejected by her, the other had lost a financial dispute with her brother. The king finally excuses the lady to the pleading of her children. He refuses to take part in the murder and leaves. Mária prays in her chamber as the advisors and the executioner barge in despite the king's departure, stabbing her to death. The hunting party returns to the estate, only to find the dying Mária, who can say goodbye to her husband before succumbing to her wounds. István swears revenge on his wife's killers.
