= Budapest Philharmonic Orchestra =

Hungarian orchestra founded in 1853

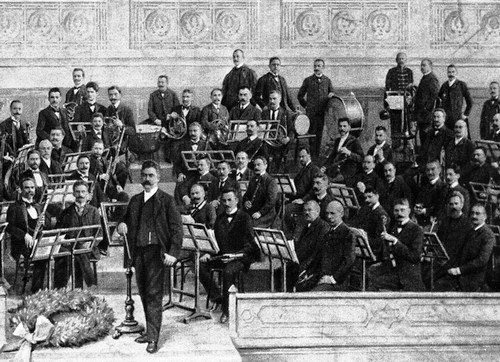
Budapest Philharmonic Orchestra, Conductor István Kerner

The Budapest Philharmonic Orchestra (Hungarian: Budapesti Filharmóniai Társaság Zenekara) is Hungary's oldest extant orchestra. It was founded in 1853 by Ferenc Erkel under the auspices of the Budapest Philharmonic Society. For many years it was Hungary's only professional orchestra. The ensemble is an independent body, now organised by musicians of the Opera House, directed by the chairman-conductor and the board of directors. Its main concert venue is the Hungarian State Opera House, where they give around ten concerts per year.

Since its foundation famous composers have given concerts with the orchestra. Franz Liszt travelled regularly to Budapest and appeared as guest conductor with them; among its other guest conductors over the past 150 years have been Brahms, Dvořák, and Mahler.

The Budapest Philharmonic Orchestra has made numerous concert tours to other European countries, the United States, and Japan.

== History ==
The original members of the orchestra were drawn from musicians of the Hungarian National Theatre. Its first concert was on 20 November 1853, under the baton of Ferenc Erkel. The programme consisted of works by Beethoven (7th Symphony), Mozart, Mendelssohn and Meyerbeer.

Landmark events include:

- 25 March 1865: the first complete performance in Budapest of Beethoven's Symphony No. 9 in D minor, "Choral"
- 16 December 1870: the premiere of Liszt's Beethoven Cantata (No. 2, S. 68), written for the centenary of Beethoven's birth, conducted by the composer
- 9 November 1881: first performance of Johannes Brahms Piano Concerto No 2, played by Johannes Brahms and conducted by Alexander Erkel
- 19 March 1888: the first performance in Hungary of Berlioz's Grande Messe des Morts (Requiem), conducted by Sándor Erkel
- 20 November 1889: the world premiere of Mahler's Symphony No. 1 "Titan", conducted by the composer
- 8 April 1907: the first performance in Hungary of Liszt's oratorio Christus This was Hans Richter's final appearance with the orchestra.

Many Hungarian composers have written works especially for the orchestra, including Erkel, Liszt, Goldmark, Dohnányi, Bartók, Kodály, Weiner, Kadosa and Szokolay.

Many renowned foreign composers have conducted the Philharmonic Orchestra in performances of their works: Brahms, Dvořák, Mahler, Mascagni, Prokofiev, Ravel, Respighi, Richard Strauss and Stravinsky. Other conductors to appear with the orchestra include Denes Agay, Eugen d'Albert, Édouard Colonne, Arthur Nikisch, Gabriel Pierné, Felix Weingartner, Bruno Walter, Erich Kleiber and Otto Klemperer.

== Chairmen-conductors ==
The chairmen-conductors of the orchestra have been:

- 1853-1871: Ferenc Erkel
- 1875-1900: Sándor Erkel (Ferenc Erkel's son)
- 1900-1918: István Kerner
- 1919-1944: Ernő Dohnányi
- 1960-1967: János Ferencsik
- 1967-1986: András Kóródi
- 1989-1994: Erich Bergel
- 1997-2005: Rico Saccani
- 2011-2014: György Győriványi Ráth
- 2014-current: Pinchas Steinberg

== Gallery ==
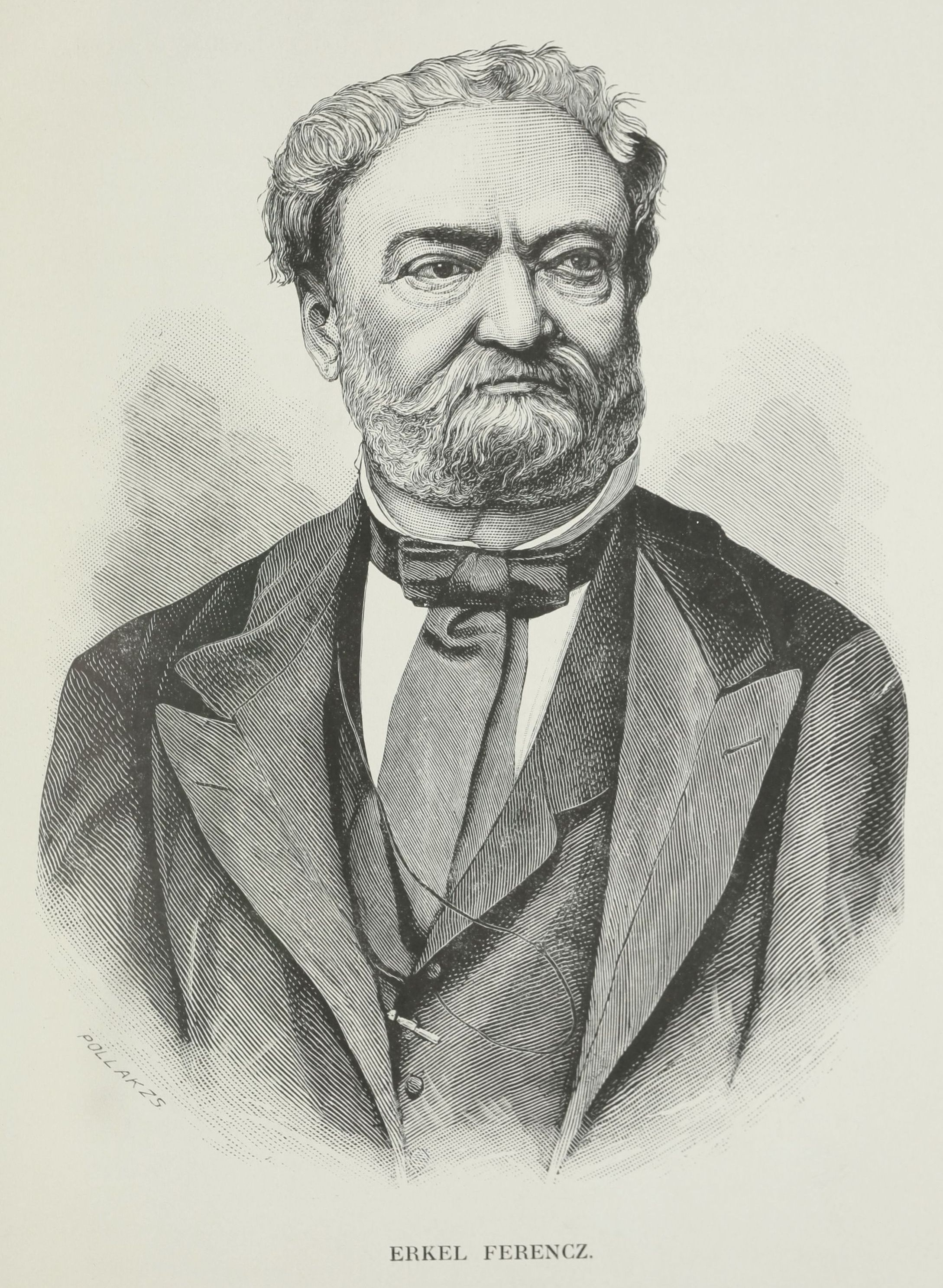
Ferenc Erkel, founder and first conductor of the orchestra

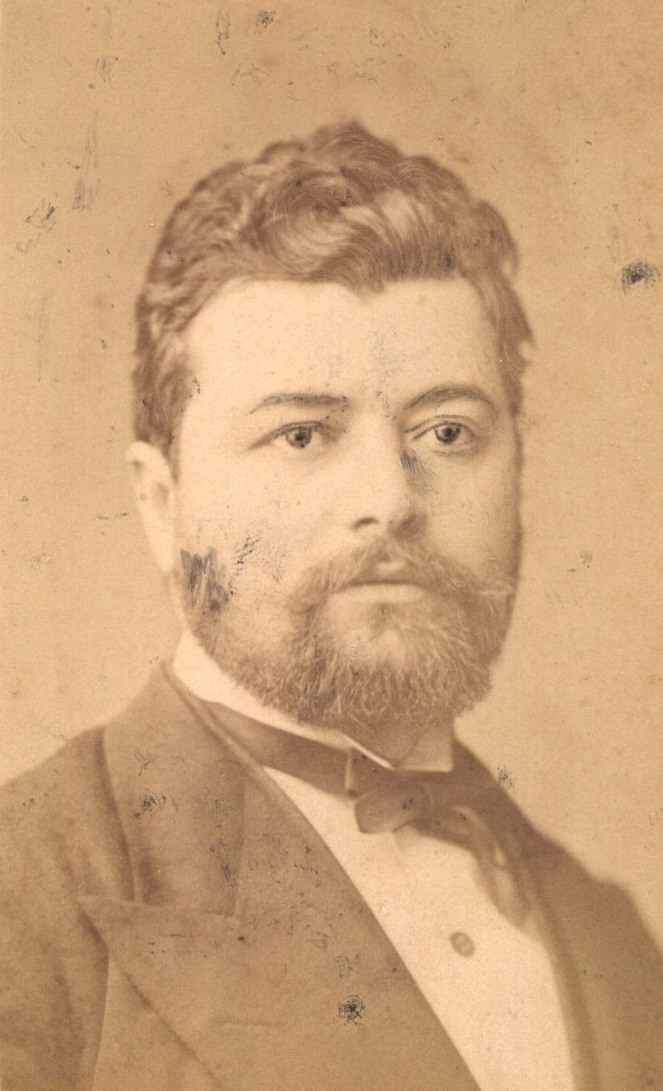
Sándor Erkel, the son of Ferenc Erkel, chairman-conductor (1875–1900)

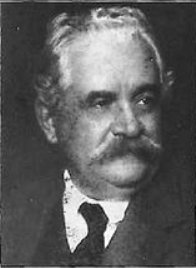
István Kerner, principal conductor (1900–1918)

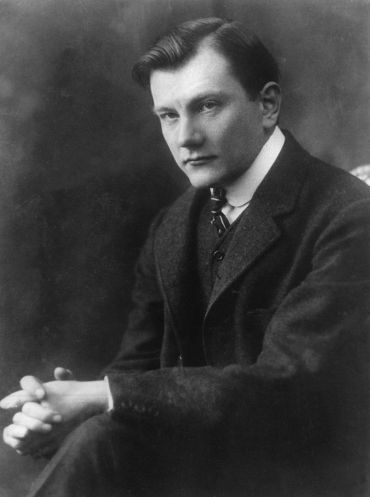
Ernő Dohnányi, president-conductor of the orchestra (1919–1944)

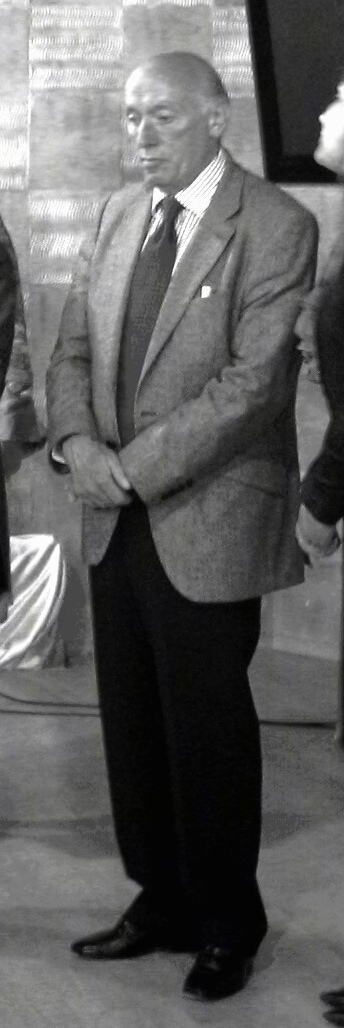
Pinchas Steinberg, chief conductor of the orchestra (2014-)

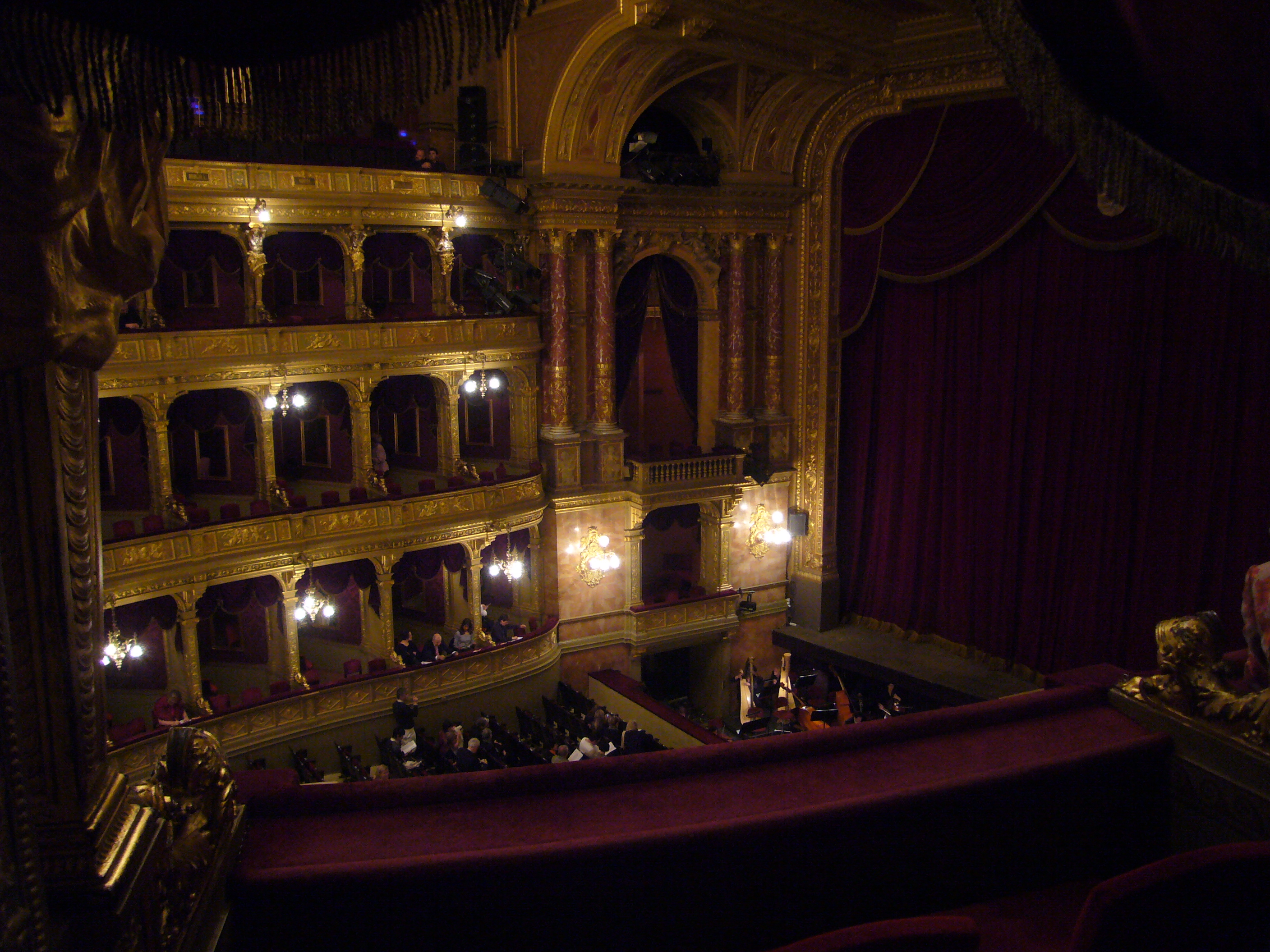
Hungarian State Opera House, the main concert venue of the orchestra

== See also ==
- Hungarian State Opera

== Sources ==
- History of the Philharmonic Society - official website of the orchestra
- Encyclopædia Britannica - "Budapest Philharmonic Orchestra"
