= Gabor Carelli =

Hungarian classical tenor

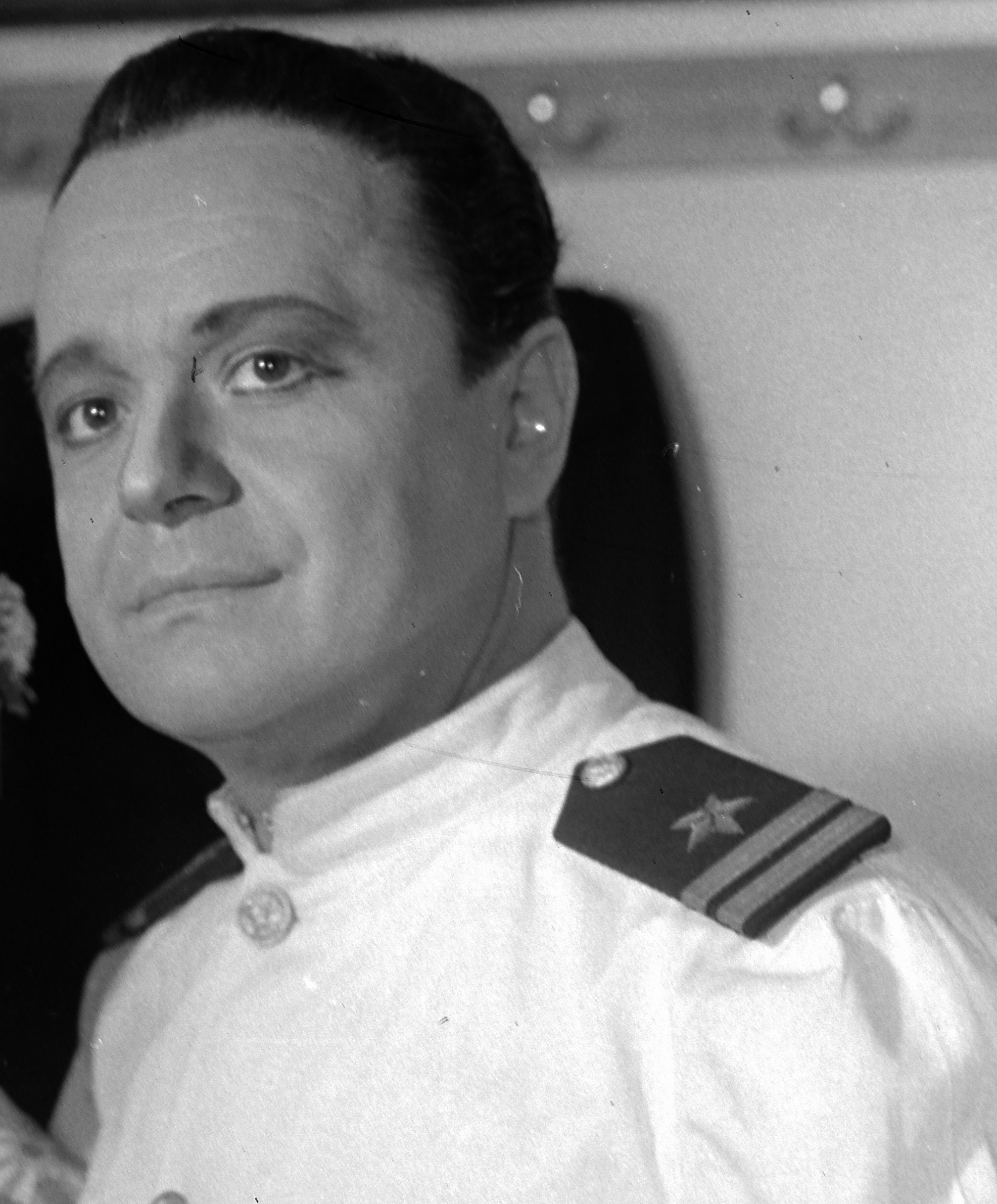
- Born: Krausz, Gábor Pál; 1915; Budapest, Hungary
- Died: January 22, 1999 (aged 83–84); Manhattan, New York City, U.S.
- Occupations: Classical tenor, singing teacher
- Years active: 1938–1999
- Known for: Commitment to the Metropolitan Opera, teaching at the Manhattan School of Music

Gabor Carelli (born as Krausz, Gábor Pál) (1915 – 22 January 1999) was a Hungarian classical tenor who had an important career in operas and concerts in North America during the mid-20th century. He was notably committed to the Metropolitan Opera in New York City from 1951 to 1974 where he gave a total of 1,079 performances. Music critic Elizabeth Forbes stated that he had "a lyrical voice, a stylish technique and an aptitude for comedy." In 1964 he joined the faculty of the Manhattan School of Music, where he taught singing and worked as an ensemble instructor until his death in Manhattan at the age of 83.

== Life and career ==
Born in Budapest, Carelli was the son of Hungarian Jews. He studied singing at the Franz Liszt Academy of Music while simultaneously attending Eötvös Loránd University where he earned a law degree. He pursued further studies in opera in Rome where he was a pupil of Beniamino Gigli for two years.

Carelli made his stage debut in 1938 in Florence as Rodolfo in Giacomo Puccini's La bohème. He spent the next year performing in a variety of Italian theaters before moving to New York City in 1939. He spent the 1940s touring with various opera companies and performing as a recitalist and concert performer throughout North America. He was particularly admired for his work as a soloist in Giuseppe Verdi's Requiem, Gioachino Rossini's Stabat Mater, Zoltán Kodály's Psalmus Hungaricus, and Ludwig van Beethoven's Symphony No. 9. In 1951, he sang the role of Dr. Caius for an NBC Radio broadcast of Verdi's Falstaff with conductor Arturo Toscanini and the NBC Symphony Orchestra. The performance was re-issued on CD by the RCA music label in 2010. In 1952 he was the tenor soloist for the United States premiere of Puccini's Messa di Gloria in Chicago.

On 17 November 1951, Carelli made his debut at the Metropolitan Opera as Don Curzio in Wolfgang Amadeus Mozart's The Marriage of Figaro with Cesare Siepi in the title role, Nadine Conner as Susanna, John Brownlee as Count Almaviva, Victoria de los Angeles as Countess Almaviva, and Mildred Miller as Cherubino. He spent the next 23 years at the Met appearing in a variety of parts from supporting tenor buffo roles to leading roles. He portrayed a total of 56 different parts in 39 operas with some of his larger roles being Alfredo in La Traviata, the Captain in Wozzeck, Count Almaviva in The Barber of Seville, Count Elemer in Arabella, the Duke of Mantua in Rigoletto, Ernesto in Don Pasquale, Mario Cavaradossi in Tosca, Pinkerton in Madama Butterfly, Rodolfo, Tamino in The Magic Flute, and Tonio in La fille du régiment. However, he was more often seen at the house in smaller to mid-sized roles such as Abbé in Adriana Lecouvreur, Arturo Bucklaw in Lucia di Lammermoor, Gaston in La traviata, the Judge in Un ballo in maschera, Matteo Borsa in Rigoletto, Moser in Die Meistersinger von Nürnberg, Pong in Turandot, and Trin in La fanciulla del West. On 16 September 1966, he performed the role of the Soldier of Caesar in the world premiere of Samuel Barber's Antony and Cleopatra. His final performance at the Met was on 22 January 1974 as one of the Jews in Richard Strauss's Salome with Grace Bumbry in the title role.

== Autobiography ==
- Utam a Metropolitanbe [in Hungarian, 'My way to the Metropolitan'] Zeneműkiadó Budapest 1979 208 p. ISBN 963-330-315-X

== Sources ==
- Gabor Carelli, 83, Opera Singer, Allan Kozinn, The New York Times, January 27, 1999
- Obituary: Gabor Carelli, Elizabeth Forbes, The Independent, 29 January 1999
- Metropolitan Opera Archives
