= Rico Saccani =

American conductor (born 1952)

- Born: April 16, 1952 (age 74); Tucson, Arizona
- Occupation: Conductor
- Years active: 1982 – present

Rico Saccani (born April 16, 1952) is an American conductor who served as music director and artistic adviser of the Budapest Philharmonic Orchestra between 1996 and 2005 and was principal guest conductor of the Hungarian State Opera from 1985 to 2005.

== Biography ==
Saccani began his music career with piano studies at age six. He attended the National Music Camp in Interlochen, Michigan from 1965–1968 and went on to the Chautauqua Summer Music Institute from 1969-1972. In 1973, he attended the Summer Academy at Fontainebleau where he worked with Nadia Boulanger. Following over 300 Community Concert piano recitals from 1974–1978, he participated in the 1978 Leeds and Tchaikowsky International Piano Competitions.

In 1974, Saccani graduated from the University of Arizona with a B.S. in Business and returned in 1980 for a B.M. in Music. From 1980-1982 he attended the University of Michigan School of Music where he obtained his M.M. in Conducting under Gustav Meier and his D.M.A. under Louis Nagel.

Saccani attended the 1983 summer conducting seminar for young conductors at Tanglewood where he worked with Seiji Ozawa, Leonard Bernstein and Maurice Abravanel. During a seven-year apprenticeship with Italian conductor Giuseppe Patane, Saccani won top prize in the 1984 Herbert von Karajan International Conducting Competition in Berlin.

Saccani was engaged to perform with the Berlin and Stuttgart Radio Orchestras, the Royal Danish Philharmonic and the Spoleto Festival. His opera debut came in 1985 in Verdi's Un giorno di regno at the Teatro Filarmonico di Verona, La traviata at the Paris Opera and the Vienna State Opera, Il turco in Italia at the Rossini Festival in Pesaro plus La bohème at the Philadelphia Opera with Luciano Pavarotti for the PBS American television network.

== Guest conducting ==
Saccani appeared regularly as guest conductor with many important symphony orchestras including the Bavarian Radio Orchestra (Munich), the Czech Philharmonic, the Irish National Symphony, the Tokyo Philharmonic and Yomiuri Symphonies, the Oslo Philharmonic, the Madrid and Bilbao Orchestras, the Gurzenisch Orchestra (Cologne), the Orchestre de chambre de Genève (Geneva Chamber Orchestra), the Hungarian National State Philharmonic, the Mannheim National Theater Orchestra, the Marseilles Opera Orchestra and the Franz Liszt Chamber Orchestra.

Maestro Saccani also appeared at the Hamburg State Opera, the Lyon Opera, the Monte-Carlo Opera, the Arena de Nîmes Festival, the Paris Opéra Comique, Rome, Dresden and Cologne Operas.

Saccani made his Metropolitan Opera debut in Il trovatore and was re-engaged for the first international radio broadcast of Traviata and Aida. He also conducted at the Teatro San Carlo (Naples), the Arena di Verona (Rigoletto), the Houston Grand Opera, the Puccini Festival Torre del Lago (Turandot), the Teatro Bellini di Catania (La Favorite and I puritani) as well as the Maggio Musicale Fiorentino, the Avenches Swiss Festival and the Santander Summer Music Festival in Spain.

Maestro Saccani was chief conductor and music director of the Budapest Philharmonic from 1999–2006 as well as principal guest conductor of the Hungarian State Opera during the same years. He initiated a "Verdi Marathon" in the Hungarian State Opera house in January 2000 celebrating the Millennium where he conducted seven Verdi operas in nine evenings. He returned to New York's Carnegie Hall and Washington's Kennedy Center that same year with the Iceland Symphony as their Music Director during their North American tour.

== Symphonies and performers ==
Among those with whom Saccani has performed are:

=== Symphonies ===
- American Symphony Orchestra (New York City)
- Bavarian Radio Orchestra (Munich)
- Berlin Radio Symphony Orchestra
- Budapest Philharmonic
- Hungarian State Opera Orchestra
- Houston Grand Opera Symphony Orchestra (Houston Symphony)
- Irish National Opera Orchestra (Dublin)
- Metropolitan Opera Orchestra (New York City)
- Monte-Carlo Opera Orchestra
- Moscow Symphony (Puccini Festival, Torre del Lago Italy)
- Oslo Philharmonic
- Paris Opera Orchestra
- Rome Opera Orchestra
- Royal Philharmonic of Denmark (Copenhagen)
- Stuttgart Radio Orchestra
- Tokyo Philharmonic
- Vienna State Opera Symphony Orchestra (Vienna Philharmonic)
- Yomiuri (Tokyo) Symphony Orchestra
- Guiyang (China) Symphony Orchestra

=== Performers ===
- Roberto Alagna
- Lucia Aliberti
- Cecilia Bartoli
- Carlo Bergonzi
- Beaux Arts Trio
- Alessandro Corbelli
- Ghena Dimitrova
- Peter Dvorsky
- Edita Gruberova
- Judith Ingolfsson
- Alfredo Kraus
- Denis Matsouev
- Aprile Milo
- Luciano Pavarotti
- Alberto Rinaldi
- Roberto Scandiuzzi
- Diana Soviero
- Sharon Sweet
- Julian Lloyd-Weber
- Dolora Zajick
- Giorgio Zancanaro
- Franco Zeffirelli

== Selected discography ==
=== Budapest Philharmonic Orchestra ===
- Schumann: Symphony No. 4 – Cello Concerto (Tamás Varga, solo) – Manfred Overture
- Dvořák: Symphony No. 9 ("From the New World") – Scherzo capriccioso
- Tchaikovsky: Symphony No. 1 ("Winter Dreams") – Prokofiev: Piano Concerto No. 3 (Kun-Woo Paik, solo)
- Rimsky-Korsakov: Capriccio Espagnol – Bartók: Hungarian Sketches – Vaughan Williams: Fantasy on a Theme by Thomas Tallis – Erkel: Festival Overture
- Gershwin: An American in Paris – Copland: Rodeo Suite – Barber: Adagio – Bernstein: Symphonic Dances from West Side Story
- Dvořák: Symphony No. 8 – Khachaturian: Violin Concerto (Livia Sohn, solo)
- Kodály: Háry János Suite – Bartók: Concerto for Orchestra
- Beethoven: Symphony No. 3 ("Eroica") – Prokofiev: Symphony No. 1 ("Classical")
- Respighi: The Pines of Rome – Roman Festivals – The Fountains of Rome
- Mussorgsky: Pictures at an Exhibition – Rimsky-Korsakov: Scheherazade
- Orff: Carmina Burana
- Cilea: Adriana Lecouvreur (Maria Temesi, Alberto Cupido, Cleopatra Ciurca, Lorenzo Saccomani)
- Donizetti: Lucia di Lammermoor (Inga Nielsson, Piero Cappuccilli, Giorgio Lamberti) – Messa di Gloria – La favorita (Denyce Graves, Salvatore Fisichella, Paolo Coni, Dimitri Kavrakos)
- Giordano: Andrea Chénier (Kristjan Johansson, Maria Guleghina, Bela Ferencz)
- Leoncavallo: I Pagliacci (Vladimir Atlantov, Natalia Troitskaya, Alexandru Agache)
- Mascagni: Cavalleria rusticana (Galina Savova, Piero Cappuccilli, Vasile Moldoveanu)
- Mozart: Le nozze di Figaro (Janet Perry, William Stone, John Cheek)
- Ponchielli: La Gioconda (Maria Guleghina, Kristjan Johannsson, Bela Perencz, Judit Nemeth)
- Verdi: Otello (Kristjan Johansson, Ilona Tokody, Sherrill Milnes, Antonio Marcenò)
- Verdi: Falstaff (Alberto Rinaldi, Patricia Schuman, Andrea Andonian, Ned Barth, Kathleen Kuhlmann, Eva Batori, Istvan Kovachshazi)
- Verdi: Un ballo in maschera (Giorgina Lukacs, Peter Kelen, Anatolij Fokonov, Zsusa Csonka)
- Verdi: Aida (Wilhemina Fernandez, Bruno Sebastian, Barbara Dever, Mark Rucker)
- Verdi: Rigoletto (Leo Nucci, Mariella Devia, Marcello Giordani)
- Verdi: Macbeth (Yasuo Horiuchi, Giorgina Lukacs, Attila Kiss)
- Verdi: La traviata (Diana Soviero, Jerry Hadley, Brian Schexnayder)
- Verdi: Il trovatore (Vyacheslov Polozov, Sharon Sweet, Dolora Zajick, Alexandru Agache)
- Verdi: Un giorno di regno (Alessandro Corbelli, Enzo Dara, Nelson Portella, Luciana D'Intino, Krystyna Rorbach, Paolo Barbacini)
- Puccini: Turandot (Ghena Dimitrova, Kristjan Johansson, Katia Ricciarelli, Paata Burchuladze)
- Puccini: Manon Lescaut (Ilona Tokody, Peter Kelen, Lajos Miller)
- Puccini: La bohème (Luciano Pavarotti, Veronica Kinsces, Sandor Sòlyom-Nagy, Madeline Reneè, Laszlo Polgar)
- Puccini: Tosca (Giorgina Lukacs, Paul Lyon, Ned Barth)
- Puccini: Madama Butterfly (Raina Kabaivanska, Nicola Martinucci, Paola Romanò, Franco Giovine)
- Rossini: Il barbiere di Siviglia (Dalibor Jenis, Gloria Scalchi, Benjamin Brecher, Edward Crafts, Alberto Rinaldi, Judith Nemeth)
- Rossini: Il turco in Italia (Simone Alaimo, Bruno Praticò, Valeria Esposito, Robert Swensen)

=== Other orchestras and performances ===
- National Symphony Orchestra of Ireland, conducted by Rico Saccani
  - Verdi: Aida (Maria Dragoni, Kristjan Johannsson, Barbara Dever, Mark Rucker)
- National Symphony Orchestra of Ireland, conducted by Rico Saccani
  - Respighi: Ancient Airs and Dances, Suites Nos. 1–3
- Anatoli Fokonov, Gianni Mongiardino, Marta Szucs and Rico Saccani
  - Bellini: I puritani (Marta Szucs, Gianni Mongiardino, Anatoli Fokonov)

== Awards and recognition ==
2005 Legion of Honor (Hungary) for "distinguished contributions to Hungary's cultural life for over 20 years"

Cultural offices
Preceded by Erich Bergel	Chief Conductor, Budapest Philharmonic Orchestra; 1996-2005	Succeeded by György Győriványi Ráth
