= Névtelen hősök =

Névtelen hősök [′Nameless heroes′] is an 1880 Hungarian four-act opera by Ferenc Erkel.
