= Sándor Erkel =

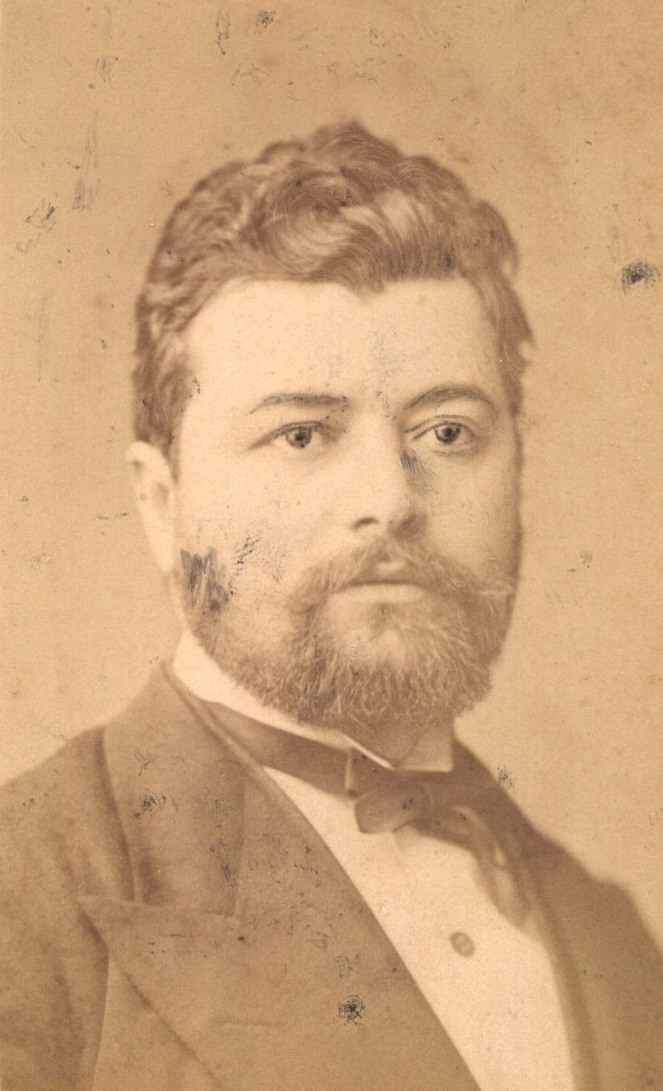
Sándor Erkel

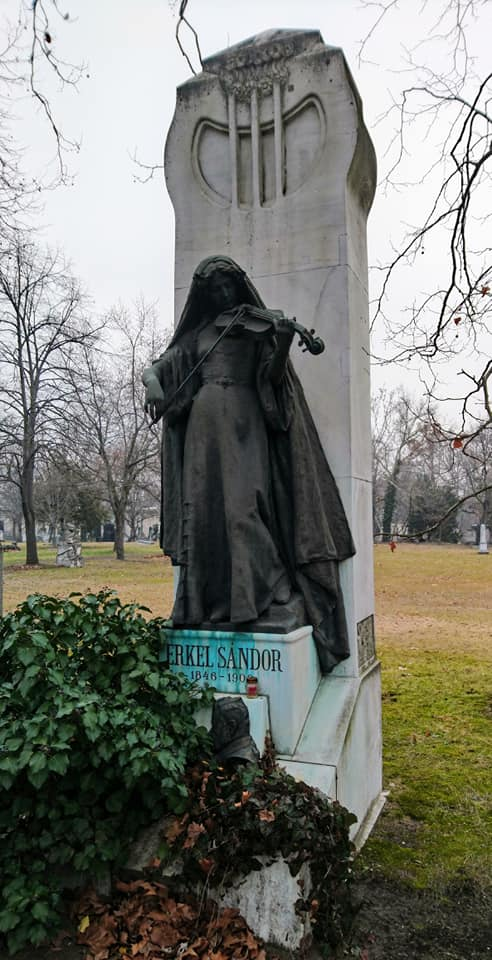
Grave of Sándor Erkel in Kerepesi Cemetery, Budapest

Sándor Erkel (2 January 1846 – 14 October 1900) (Hungarian: Erkel Sándor) was a Hungarian composer, conductor and director of the Hungarian State Opera.

== Biography ==
Born in Buda, Erkel was the youngest son of the famous Hungarian composer, Ferenc Erkel. He first studied music with his father; later, his teacher was another Hungarian composer, Mihály Mosonyi.

He started his career just as an orchestra musician of the National Theatre in Pest playing timpani; he was also the dulcimer soloist at the premiere of his father's opera, the Bánk bán. Later he became the conductor of the theatre's orchestra, and at the age of thirty in 1876, he was appointed the music director of the ensemble. In 1884, Erkel became the music director of the newly established Hungarian State Opera (1884–1886), – its founding director was his father, Ferenc – premiering Hungarian and foreign operas.

Erkel accepted the chairman-conductor position of the Budapest Philharmonic Orchestra in 1875, a post he held until 1900. Johannes Brahms premiered his Piano concerto no. 2. with the Budapest Philharmonic Orchestra on 9 November 1881 in Budapest, with Erkel as conductor.

Erkel died unexpectedly in Békéscsaba on 14 October 1900. As a composer his oeuvre is relatively small, including orchestral and choral works. His only opera, Csobánc, was premiered on 13 December 1865.

== Sources ==
- Szabolcsi Bence - Tóth Aladár: Zenei lexikon, Zeneműkiadó Vállalat, 1965. I. p. 576.
- Shepard, Richard F. (November 11, 1981). "Going Out Guide". The New York Times.
- Magyar életrajzi lexikon – Erkel Sándor
- Vasárnapi Ujság, 1900/42

Cultural offices
Preceded by Ferenc Erkel	Chief Conductor, Budapest Philharmonic Orchestra; 1875-1900	Succeeded by István Kerner
