= Erich Bergel =

German trumpeter (1930–1998)

Count Erich Bergel
- Born: 1 June 1930; Râşnov, Romania
- Died: 3 May 1998 (aged 67); Ruhpolding, Germany
- Education: Gheorghe Dima Music Academy
- Occupations: Trumpet player; Conductor; Composer
- Organizations: Cluj Philharmonic Orchestra; Nordwestdeutsche Philharmonie; Hochschule der Künste

Erich Bergel (1 June 1930 – 3 May 1998) was a German trumpet player and conductor.

== Career ==
Born in Râşnov, Bergel was a flutist of the Hermannstädter Philharmoniker age 18. From 1950 to 1955 he studied conducting, organ and composition at the Gheorghe Dima Music Academy of Cluj-Napoca (Klausenburg). He was appointed principal conductor of the Cluj Philharmonic Orchestra and guest conductor of the Bucharest Philharmonic Orchestra.

He defected to Germany, where he was promoted by Herbert von Karajan. He conducted notable orchestras on tours to Paris, Auckland, Los Angeles, Berlin, Vienna and Cape Town. He was also a teacher at the Hochschule der Künste in Berlin.

From 1971 to 1974 he was the principal conductor of the Nordwestdeutsche Philharmonie in Herford. He conducted them in a recording of Les Djinns, a symphonic poem for piano and orchestra of César Franck, with pianist Volker Banfield. In 1989 he was appointed principal conductor for life of the Budapest Philharmonic Orchestra. In 1991 he recorded Béla Bartók's second violin concerto with Silvia Marcovici and the Budapest Radio Orchestra. He recorded his arrangement of Bach's Die Kunst der Fuge with the Cluj Philharmonic Orchestra. He died in Ruhpolding.

== Publications ==
- Johann Sebastian Bach, die Kunst der Fuge: Ihre geistige Grundlage im Zeichen der thematischen Bipolarität, Brockhaus Musikverlag Bonn, 1980, ISBN 3-922173-00-4
- Bachs letzte Fuge, Brockhaus Musikverlag Bonn, 1985, ISBN 3-922173-03-9

== Literature ==
- Hans Bergel: Erich Bergel. Ein Musikerleben, Gehann-Musik-Verlag, 2006, ISBN 3-927293-29-6

Cultural offices
Preceded by Werner Andreas Albert	Chief Conductor, Nordwestdeutsche Philharmonie; 1971–1974	Succeeded by János Kulka
Preceded by Bryden Thomson	Principal Conductor, BBC Welsh Symphony Orchestra; 1983–1985	Succeeded by Tadaaki Otaka
Preceded by András Kóródi	Chief Conductor, Budapest Philharmonic Orchestra; 1989-1994	Succeeded by Rico Saccani
