= Béni Egressy =

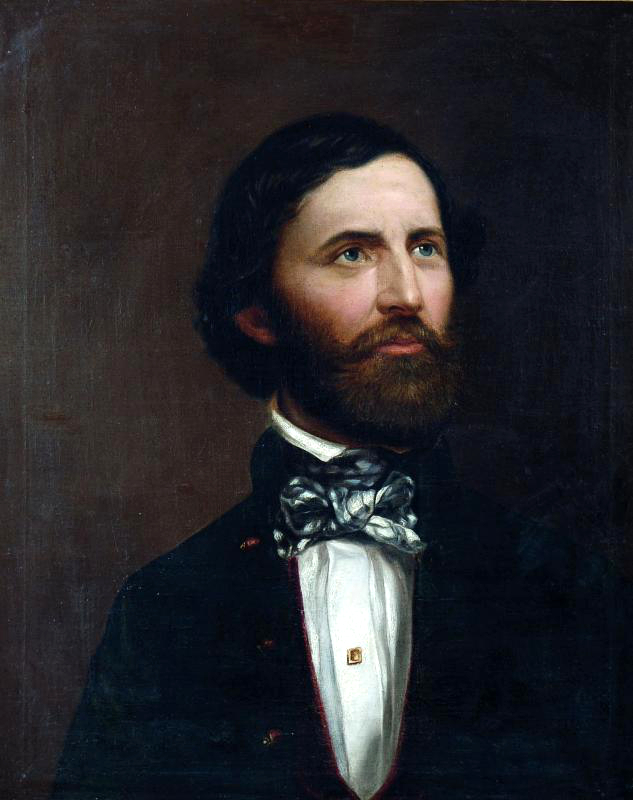
- Portrait by Miklós Barabás (1889)

Background information
- Born: Benjámin Galambos; 21 April 1814; Sajókazinc, Kingdom of Hungary, Austrian Empire
- Died: 17 July 1851 (aged 37) Pest, Kingdom of Hungary, Austrian Empire
- Genres: Folk music
- Occupations: Composer, actor, translator and librettist
- Instruments: Spinet, piano
- Years active: 1840–1851
- Spouse: Róza König (married 1841)

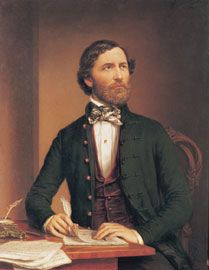
Béni Egressy

Béni Egressy (Note: Hungarian pronunciation: [ˈbeːni ˈɛɡrɛʃi]) (né Benjámin Galambos; 21 April 1814 – 17 July 1851) was a Hungarian composer, librettist, translator and actor. He created a number of popular melodic compositions, including the one to Mihály Vörösmarty's patriotic poem Szózat. He also authored the librettos of the operas Hunyadi László and Bánk bán by Ferenc Erkel.

== Biography ==
Egressy was born in 1814 in Sajókazinc, today a part of Kazincbarcika, Borsod-Abaúj-Zemplén County, Hungary, to a Protestant pastor.

He entered the stage in 1834, like his older brother Gábor Egressy, and in 1837 became a member of the national theatre in Prague. During the Revolution of 1848, he took part in the fighting and became a member of the Hungarian Honvéd resistance. He was wounded in the Battle of Kápolna and was present during the defense of Komárom under György Klapka, where he wrote the Klapka March. After the rebellion, he received amnesty and returned to the stage.

== Works ==
Egressy was more notable for his acting rather than his compositions. Nevertheless, he composed music for "Szózat", a famous poem by Hungarian poet Mihály Vörösmarty. The song later became the unofficial "second Hungarian national anthem", besides the Himnusz. His musical works are characterised by a wealth of melodies, having many of the attained great popularity in his homeland. He also wrote the libretti for Ferenc Erkel's first three operas (Bátori Mária, Hunyadi László, Bánk bán).

== See also ==
- Gábor Egressy (actor)

== Gallery ==
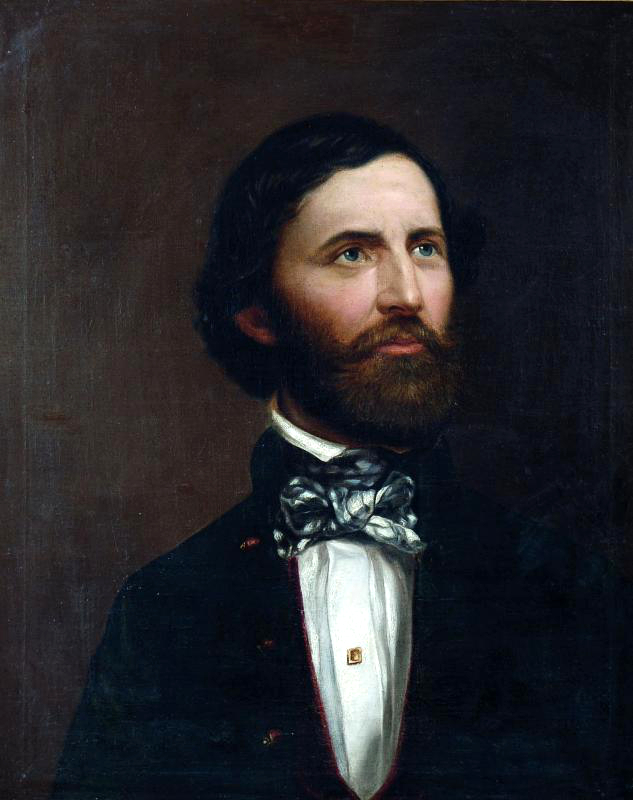
Béni Egressy

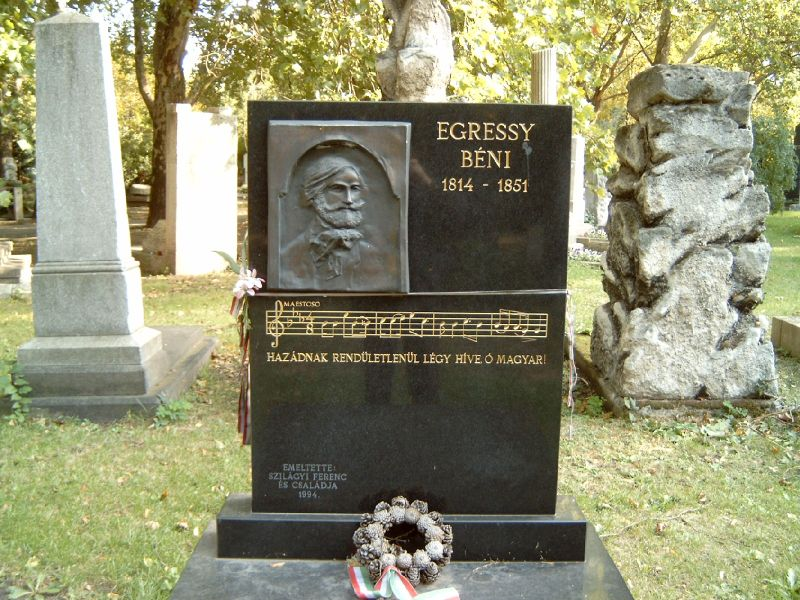
Tombstone
