= Tibor Kelen =

Hungarian opera singer (1937–2001)

Tibor Kelen (18 September 1937 – 2001) was a Hungarian opera singer and cantor, a tenor.

== Biography ==
Tibor Kelen was born in Budapest, Hungary and was a student of the Italian tenor Tito Schipa. He sang in Budapest and throughout Europe, including an engagement at La Scala in Milan. Though primarily known as a lyric tenor, he also sang heroic tenor roles with success. Kelen emigrated to Canada in 1967. In 1969, he sang the role of Alfredo in Giuseppe Verdi's La traviata with the New York City Opera, winning the company's first Morton Baum Prize as most promising new singer.

Giving up opera, he went on to pursue a career as a cantor at Temple Beth El in Cedarhurst, New York where he served for over twenty years. He died at the age of 63 in Saint John's Hospital in Far Rockaway, Queens, following a stroke. He was survived by his wife, Gabika (born as Gabriella Veres) and three children: Diana, Edgar and Martin.

Gabika was born in Budapest. She studied at the Bela Bartok music academy with Rezso Feleki and majored in singing and the violin. She sang in many places, including the Budapest Dohany Street Great Synagogue where she was soloist. She frequently performed also elsewhere in Hungary as well as internationally. Later she decided to devote herself to her family.

Tibor Kelen's younger brother Peter Kelen is also a tenor and sings with the Hungarian Opera Company. Another brother, Tamas Kelen, is a noted cantor in Budapest.

== Sources ==
- Lipman, Steve (May 11, 2001). "Tibor Kelen, Longtime Long Island Cantor, Dies At 63". The Jewish Week. Archived from the original on September 21, 2014 – via HighBeam Research.
- Central Opera Service Bulletin, March/April 1969 (PDF). Accessed 26 February 2009.
