= Reuben and Rachel =

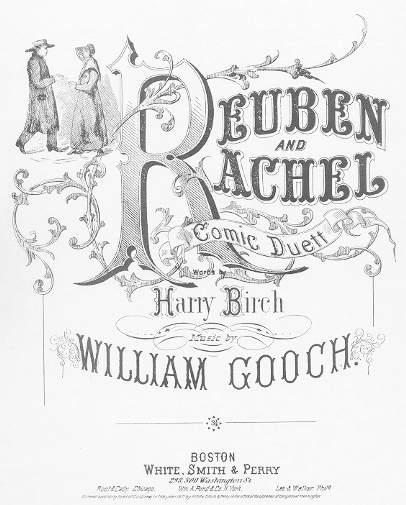

Song
- Language: English
- Published: 1871
- Composer: William Gooch
- Lyricist: Harry Birch

"Reuben and Rachel" is a popular song with words written by Harry Birch and music by William Gooch, originally published in Boston in 1871 by White, Smith, & Perry. The song regained popularity in the 20th century as a children's song.

The first line of the song, "Reuben, Reuben, I've been thinking," was reused in a popular song at the close of World War I (1919), "How Ya Gonna Keep 'em Down on the Farm (After They've Seen Paree)?."

It was often sung on the playgrounds as: "Reuben, Reuben, I've been thinking what in the world have you been drinking? Smells like whiskey, tastes like wine. Oh my gosh! It's turpentine!" The melody has often been used for parodies, such as Bowser and Blue's "Where The Sun Don't Shine! (The Colorectal Surgeon's Song)".

The song is not related to the 1799 novel of the same name by Susanna Rowson.
