= István király =

István király is an 1886 Hungarian opera with music by Ferenc Erkel and libretto by Antal Váradi on King Stephen I of Hungary.

== Roles ==
Role	Voice Type
István (Stephen I), King of Hungary	Baritone
Gizella, his wife, the Queen	Mezzo-soprano
Duke Imre (Emeric), their son	Tenor
Péter, son of the Prince of Venice, younger brother of Stephen	Baritone
Vazul, Duke of the House of Árpád	Baritone
Sebős, son of Buda, courtier	Tenor
Crescimira, daughter of the Croatian King	Soprano
Jóva, Gizella's handmaid	Alto
Zolna, her daughter	Soprano
Gellért, bishop and Imre's tutor	Bass

Chorus of dukes of the house of Árpád, German Knights, and bishops.

== Summary ==
Set during the reign of Stephen I, the opera is a historical drama about the death of Imre and the struggle between Christianity and Paganism.

== Recordings ==
- Naxos Records, Valéria Csányi, 2014.
