= Oh aint I got the Blues! =

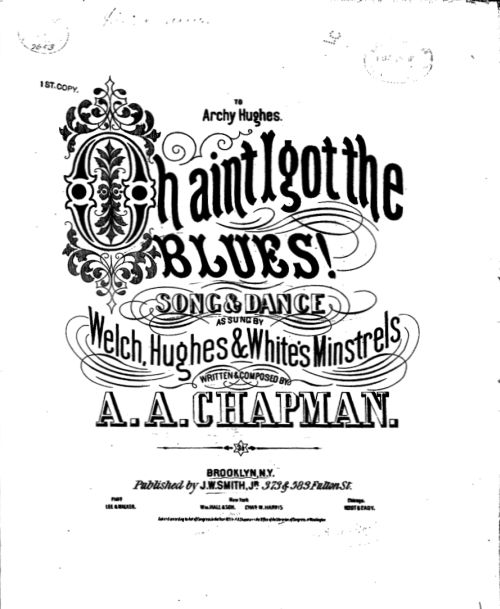
- Sheet music cover, 1871

Song
- Published: 1871
- Songwriter(s): A.A. Chapman

"Oh aint I got the Blues!" is a song and dance tune written by A.A. Chapman and published in 1871. In the song the dancer is bemoaning how unlucky he is. Each verse ends with the chorus:

Oh aint I got the blues!
My sadness you'd excuse,
If you knew like me what 'tis to have
Such a terrible fit of the blues.

The chorus ends with a short dance routine. The earliest sheet music identifies it as performed by the Welch, Hughes & White's Minstrels. "Oh aint I got the Blues!" is often cited as being one of the early "blues"-titled songs.
