= Vincent Adler =

Hungarian composer and pianist

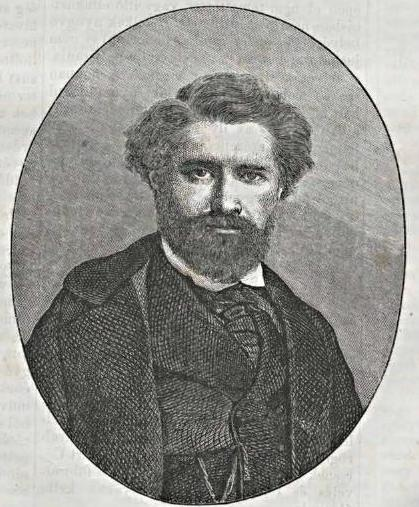
Portrait of Vincent Adler

Vincent Adler (3 April 1826, Győr – 4 January 1871, Geneva) was a Hungarian composer and pianist.

Adler received his initial musical training from his brother-in-law Ferenc Erkel and later studied in Vienna, before finally settling in Paris. From Paris, he embarked on numerous concert tours of Europe as a soloist. In 1864, he started teaching at the Geneva Conservatory.

Adler composed many études and virtuosic salon pieces for the piano, which were filled with Hungarian colour.
