= Lóránt Hajdu =

Hungarian composer

Lóránt Hajdu (born 12 August 1937, in Bucharest) is a Hungarian composer and pensionary piano and composition teacher.

== Life ==
Lóránt Hajdu was born in Bucharest, Romania, to a Hungarian family in 1937. In his early childhood they moved to Budapest, Hungary. He studied piano with Klára Chitz and composition with István Szelényi at the Béla Bartók Conservatory in Budapest. He graduated at the Franz Liszt Academy of Music in Budapest, where his teacher was Endre Szervánszky.

In 1966 his first Concerto for piano and orchestra won the first prize of the Queen Marie José International Competition. He taught piano and composition at the Leó Weiner Conservatory until 2007. He is founder member of the Alkotó Muzsikusok Társasága (Hungarian Society of Creative Musicians).

== Selected works ==
Concertante

- Concerto No. 1 for piano and orchestra (1966)
- Concerto No. 2 for piano and orchestra (1972)

Chamber and instrumental music

- Two Movements for viola solo (1974)

Piano

- Bagatelles (1955)
- Sonatina (1955)
- Sonatina on a Hungarian Folk Song (1962)
- 3 Etudes (1963)
- 3 Rondos (1963)
- Toccata (1972)
- Scherzo-Capriccio (1972)
- 10 Easy Piano Pieces (1972)
- Consequences (1976)
- Serial-Game Overture
- 15 Little Character Pieces
- Hommage à D. Alberti
- Spinning Top Valse
- 4 Little Picture-Etudes

== Publishers ==
- Editio Musica Budapest
- Zinneberg Musikverlag
