= Brankovics György =

Brankovics György is an opera by Ferenc Erkel to a Hungarian libretto by Ferenc Ormay and Lehel Odry, based on Károly Obernyik's drama of the same name. It was premiered on 20 May 1874 in the National Theatre.

== Roles ==
Role	Voice type
Brankovics György, despot of Serbia	baritone
Mara, his daughter	soprano
Gerő, his son	tenor
István, his son	soprano
Murat, the Ottoman Grand Vizier	tenor
Cselebi Agha	bass
Fruzsina, Mara's duenna	mezzo-soprano
Hunyadi László	tenor
Székely László, a Hungarian nobleman	baritone
Lázár, a counsellor of Brankovics	baritone
Hunyadi's delegate	baritone or tenor

== Plot (1962 version) ==
- Location: the castle of Brankovics and its vicinity
- Time: the first half of the 15th century

=== Act 1 ===
Brankovics is an ally of John Hunyadi in the fight against the invading Ottomans. His daughter, Mara, is secretly meeting with the grand vizier Murat every night in the castle's garden. John Hunyadi's delegates arrive at the castle, led by László Hunyadi, to urge Brankovics to attack the Ottoman forces. However, Brankovics had previously received the news that the Ottomans sent a delegation to him as well in order to make peace. Yielding to Hunyadi's urges, Brankovics decides to reject the Ottoman envoys and order the battle.

=== Act 2 ===
Brankovics is undecided, he can't choose whether to go against the Ottomans. He decides to receive the Ottoman delegation. He knows that his sworn word and defence of Christianity calls him to Hunyadi's side, but he is afraid that their united armies will still fall, and oppression and suffering will take over his country and his people. The leader of the Ottoman delegation is the same young warrior whom Mara met in the garden. Brankovics accepts the Ottomans' offer and makes peace with them. However, the delegation demands a pledge: they take Brankovics's two sons with them to their encampments. Murat, who, to the surprise of the Serbians is the son of the Sultan, signs the peace deal.

=== Act 3 ===
Hunyadi's armies triumphed even without the help of Brankovics. Now the mood in the despot's court has changed: those who had previously been in favour of an alliance with the Turks are the most vocal in demanding a turn against them. Brankovics has no option to back out of the deal with the Ottomans, however, as this would mean the death of his sons. He silences the discontented with a thunderous speech. Meanwhile, love blossoms between Mara and Murat. The girl asks the Grand Vizier to let her brothers return to her father's castle, in which case she herself will go with him as a guarantor. Murat would accept the offer, but Cselebi Agha, whose task it would have been to lead the sons back to Brankovics, had committed to a horrible deed: he blinds them. Brankovics paid a terrible price for his persistence: his daughter abandoned him, his sons blind. The despot vows revenge.

=== Act 4 ===
The Grand Vizier does everything in his power to cheer up his beloved, who is weeping for her brothers. In the meantime, he receives the news that Brankovics has rejoined Hunyadi's armies and is attacking Ottoman positions. Murat is baffled, he has no idea what prompted the despot's sudden change of heart. Cselebi, of course, kept silent about previous happenings. He is preparing for battle, hungry for revenge, when he receives the news that his father, the Sultan, has died and he is his successor. This fuels his fighting spirit even more, and he goes into battle in armour to avenge Brankovics's betrayal. The Serbian armies defeat the Ottomans, but Brankovics himself is fatally injured in the battle. He is brought into Murat's tent, where he regrets his betrayal and entrusts his children to László Hunyadi. As he says his final goodbyes to his blinded sons, he forgets about Mara, whom he only realises is there once it's too late.
