= Klára Kolonits =

Hungarian operatic soprano

- Education: Franz Liszt Academy of Music
- Occupation: Operatic soprano
- Organization: Hungarian State Opera
- Website: klarakolonits.com/en/bio-repertoire/

Klára Kolonits is a Hungarian operatic soprano based at the Hungarian State Opera in Budapest since 2002, who made an international career with a focus on bel canto characters.

== Life and career ==
Kolonits was born in Budapest. She studied voice at the Franz Liszt Academy. She first joined the Csokonai Theatre in Debrecen. She earned awards at major singing competitions. Kolonits became a member of the Hungarian State Opera in Budapest in 2002. Her roles there have included Mozart roles such as Konstanze in Die Entführung aus dem Serail, Fauno in Ascanio in Alba, Fiordiligi in Così fan tutte, Donna Anna in Don Giovanni and the Queen of the Night in Die Zauberflöte. She also performed there the title roles of Verdi's La traviata and Luisa Miller, Rosalinde in Die Fledermaus by J. Strauss. She has performed as a guest as Donna Anna, La traviata and Donizetti's Lucia di Lammermoor at the Gars am Kamp festival, the National Theatre Brno, the Croatian National Theatre, Zagreb, the Slovenian National Theatre in Ljubljana, the International Opera Festival in Miskolc. She appeared at the Gijón Opera in the three female characters in Offenbach's Les contes d'Hoffmann, at the Budapest Spring Festival as Sifar in Mozart's Mitridate, re di Ponto. She portrayed Countess Almaviva in Mozart's Le nozze di Figaro, La traviata and Rosalinde at the opera festival in Kirchstetten, and appeared as the Queen of the Night at the Nationaltheater Weimar.
