= Gábor Egressy (actor) =

Hungarian actor (1808-1866)

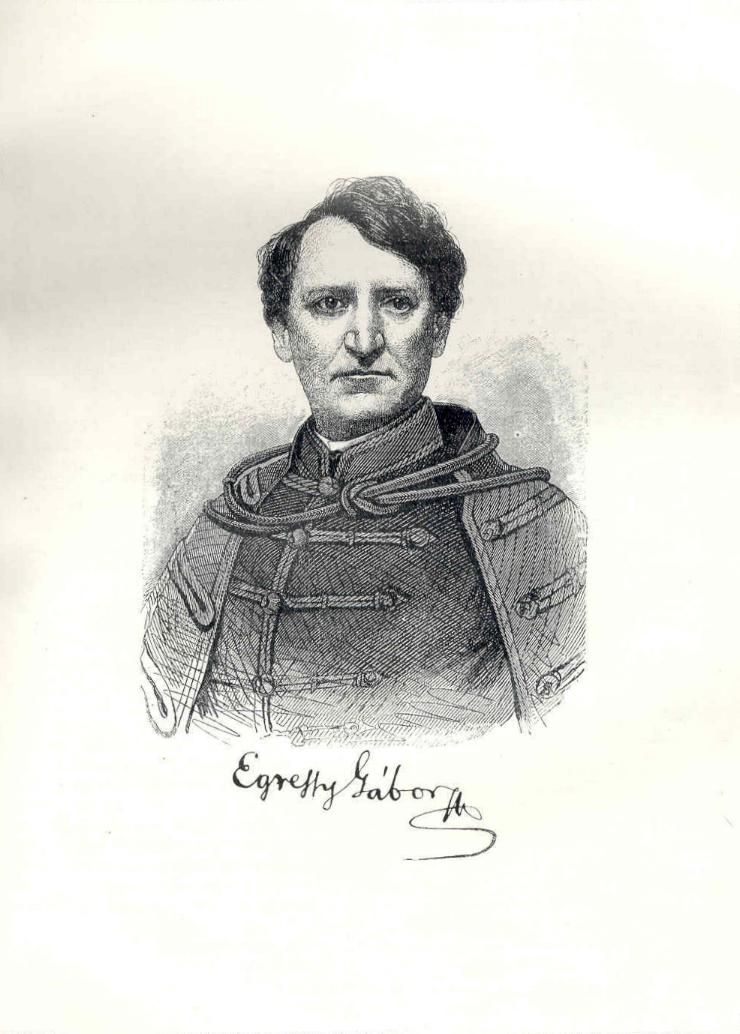
- Born: November 1, 1808; Kazincbarcika, Borsod, Hungary
- Died: 30 July 1866 (aged 57); Pest, Pest-Pilis-Solt County, Hungary

Gábor Egressy (Hungarian pronunciation: [ˈɡaːbor ˈɛɡrɛʃi]) was a Hungarian actor and brother of Béni Egressy. He was responsible for bringing the dramas of William Shakespeare to the Hungarian stage in the Hungarian Language.

== Life ==
Having taken part in several traveling actor ensembles, he found a theater in Kolozsvár to perform at. Later, he completed his artistic education in Vienna. In 1837 he became one of the most important actors at the newly opened Hungarian National Theater in Pest.

In the turbulent Hungarian Revolution of 1848 he was sent to work as a government commissioner in the lower-Tisza area, but was recalled for carrying out his duties too rigorously. He returned to the stage, but escaped to Turkey after the failure of the Hungarian revolution. In 1854 he was allowed to return, exempt from punishment.
