= Magyar Theatre =

Hungarian state-run theater in Budapest

Magyar Színház
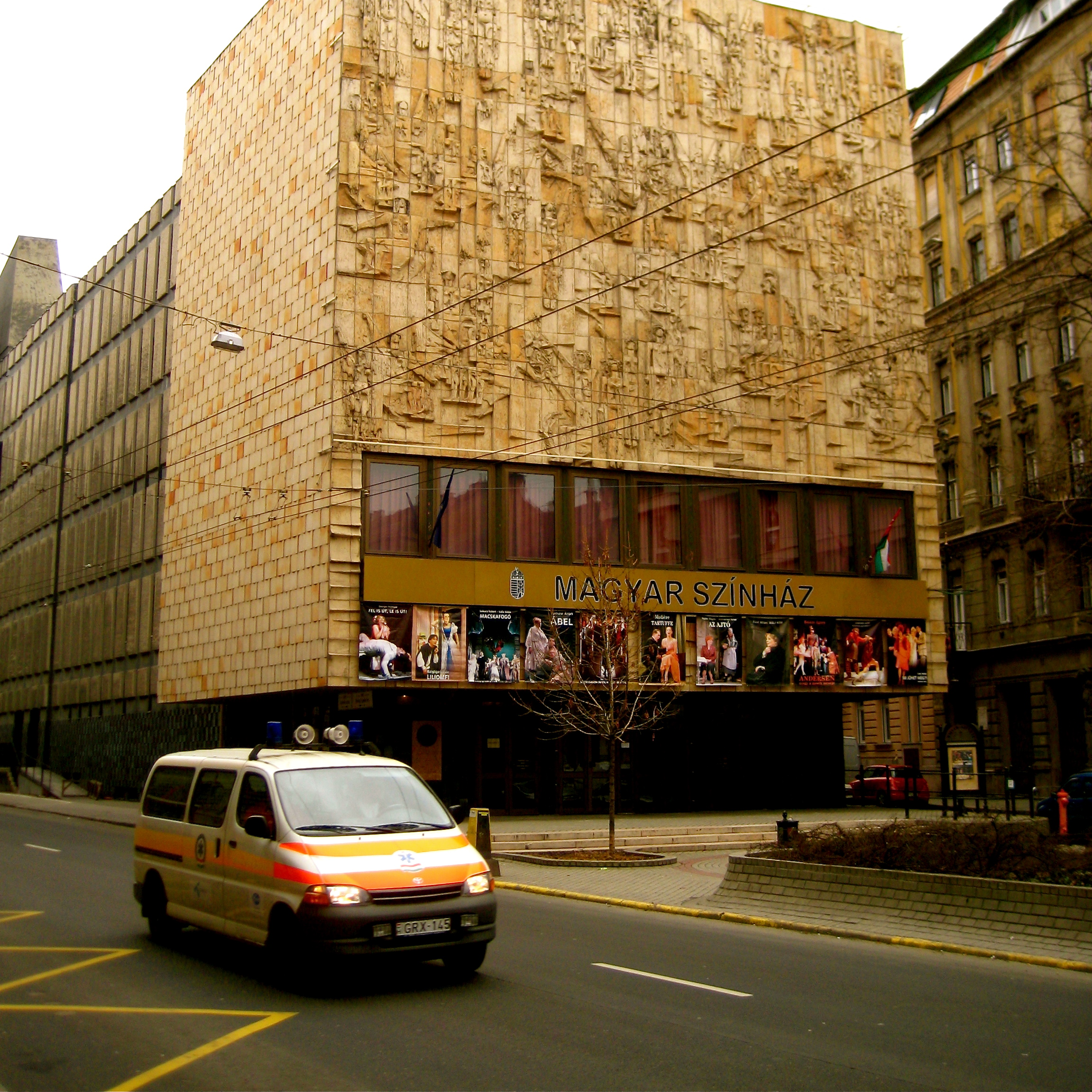
- Interactive map of Magyar Színház
- Address: Hevesi Sándor square 4
- Location: Budapest, Pest county, Hungary
- Coordinates: 47°30′12.25″N 19°4′21.57″E
- Owner: State owned
- Capacity: 665 + 95 (Imre Sinkovits small stage)
- Type: Theatre

Construction
- Built: 1897
- Renovated: 1914, 1964–1966
- Expanded: (2001 – adding a small stage)

Website
- The official website of the Magyar Színház

The Magyar Theatre is a theatre operating in Budapest, Hungary. Its company started on August 22, 1837 as the first major Hungarian-language theatrical company in the city. They operated under this label until August 8, 1840, when the name was changed to National Theatre of Hungary. Switching homes two times, the company moved to its current building in 1966. The name Magyar Theatre was restored on September 1, 2000, with the opening of the new National Theatre.

== History ==
=== Building ===
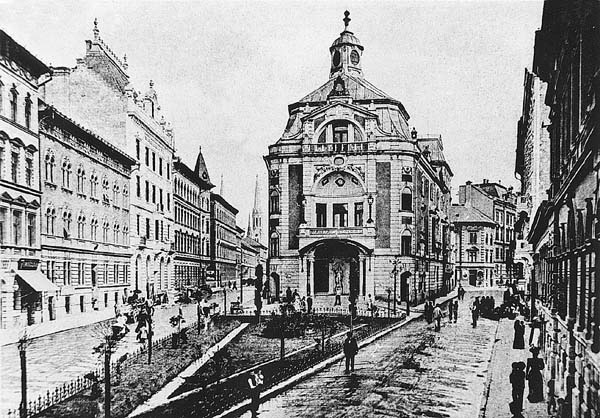
The Magyar Theatre in 1897

The Magyar Theatre, designed by Adolf Láng, and founded by the Rákosi-Beöthy family was built in 1897 in the then-suburban Izabella (today Hevesi Sándor) square. The premiere was on 16 October 1897. The two-storied auditorium had 996 seats.

In the first years, the venue mainly hosted opera pieces, then after the first decade, converted to a serious prosaic theatre. By 1907–1918 the Magyar Theatre's repertoire consisted of contemporary Hungarian and foreign dramas, supported by the building's small, intimate set-up.

In 1914 the theatre was reconstructed by architect László Vágó. A new main hall had been added, and the number of the seats were increased well over a thousand. Many of the era's most prolific directors worked in the theatre during these years, including László Márkus, János Vaszary or Sándor Hevesi. In 1947, like all of the artistic venues of Budapest, the previously private theatre was nationalized. Between 1946 and 1951 it functioned as the chamber theatre of the National Theatre, and then served as the home of the Madách Theatre (1951–1961), and the Petőfi Theatre (1962–1964).

The building got its current design in the reconstruction of 1964–66, led by Sándor Azbej, to function as a temporary home for the National Theatre. After raising down the old to the supporting walls, the new theatre got two new stories, and was also enlarged by 8m towards the square. This enabled the inclusion of a much larger main hall, and several workshops, costume and furniture storage, 10 new dressing rooms, and an enlarged auditorium. The facade is a relief made of 757 pieces of Zsolnay pyrogranite, made by sculptor Gyula Illés.

Between 1966 and 2000 the theatre was occupied by the company of (and also named) the National Theatre. After 2000, the Pesti Magyar Theatre plays in it. The Sinkovits Imre studio stage with 96 seats was opened in 2001.

=== Company ===
The foundation stone of the – first official Hungarian-speaking theatrical institution, the – Magyar Theatre in Pest was laid in 1835, which was opened on 1837 August 22. The drama of the opening lecture was presented: Mihály Vörösmarty’s Árpád's awakening (Árpád ébredése). The theater's ownership from the county was acquired by the State in 1840, and it was given the name the National Theatre. The company moved many times, when they received as a temporary home, the building in the area now known as Hevesi Sándor Square (in the seventh district of Budapest). 2002 saw the opening of the new building, which became the permanent home of the National Theatre, with a new company.

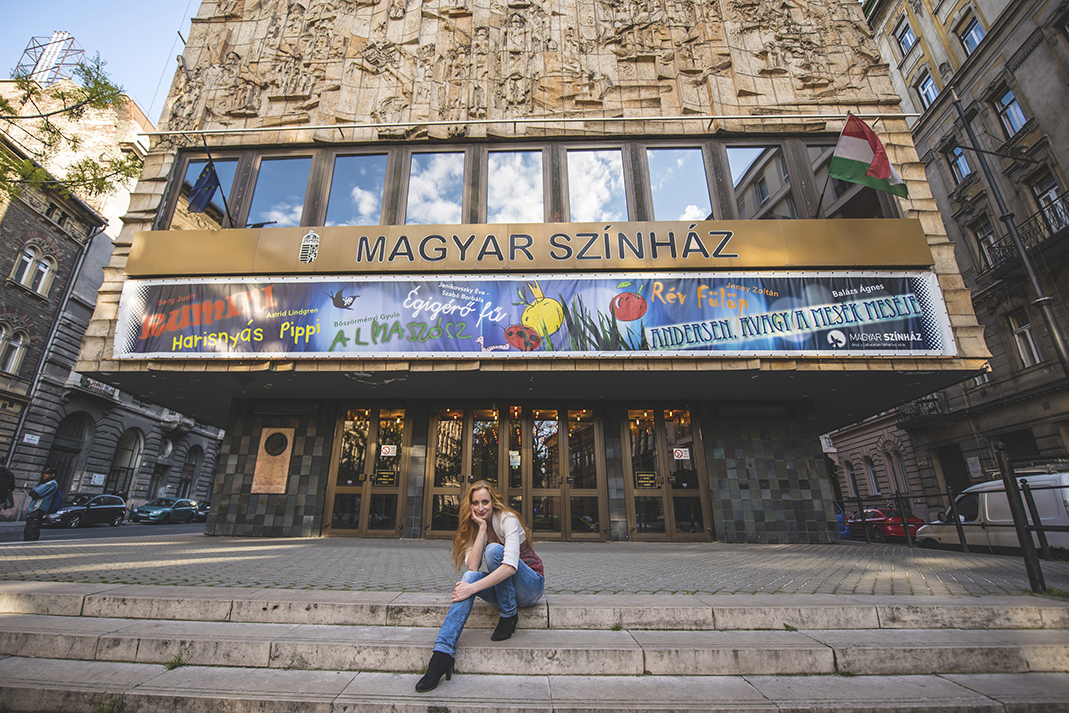
Actress Kata Losonczi in front of the theater, in 2015

The building together with the company received its name Magyar Színház in 2000. Since then, the situation is not the same as before, it is unclear between the theaters.

== After 2000 ==
Between 2000 and 2010 the director was István Iglódi. After his death, the position was given to Áron Őze (son of Lajos Őze). The company had difficulties to regain its former fame after losing its trademark title. After lay-offs and experimenting with concepts, from 2013 the theatre becomes aimed at youth and family, whereas Imre Sinkovits studio stage remains an open workshop acts as a place to experiment.

== See also ==
- National Theatre (Budapest)

== Sources ==
- Nemzeti Színház – National Theatre in the Hungarian Theatrical Lexicon (György, Székely. Magyar Színházművészeti Lexikon. Budapest: Akadémiai Kiadó, 1994. ISBN 978-963-05-6635-3), freely available on mek.oszk.hu
- This article contains a translation of Pesti Magyar Színház from hu.Wikipedia.
