= Alajos Györgyi Giergl =

Hungarian painter (1821–1863)

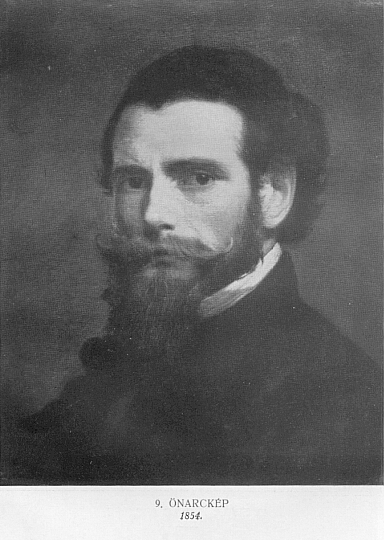
- Self-portrait (1854)
- Born: Györgyi Giergl Alajos; 1821; Pest, Kingdom of Hungary, Austrian Empire
- Died: 1863; Pest, Kingdom of Hungary, Austrian Empire

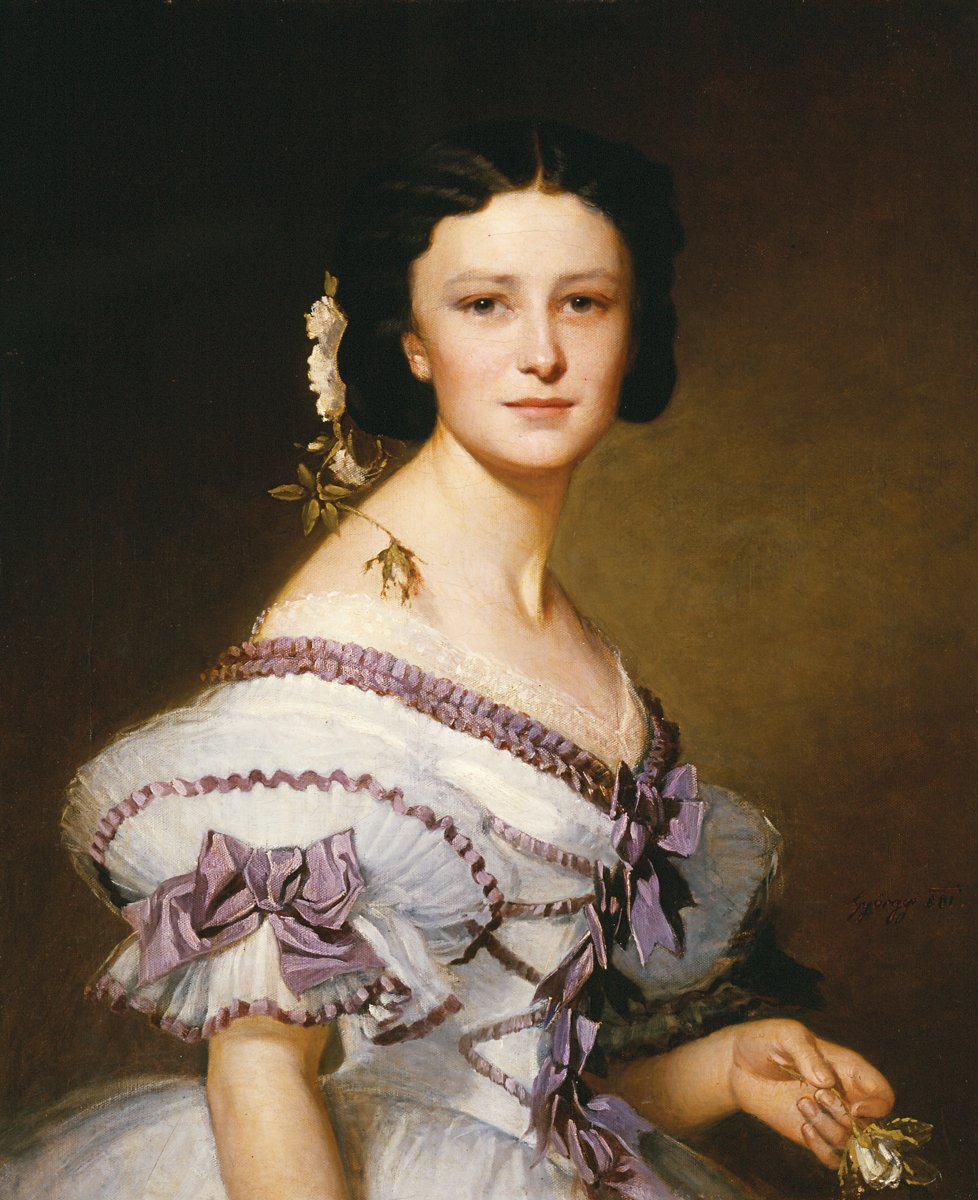
Portrait of Szidónia Deák (1861), Hungarian National Gallery.

Alajos Györgyi Giergl (1821 in Pest – 1863 in Pest) was a Hungarian painter. He is notable for his portraits and paintings in the Romanticism style.
