= Ferenc Erkel =

Hungarian composer, conductor and pianist (1810–1893)

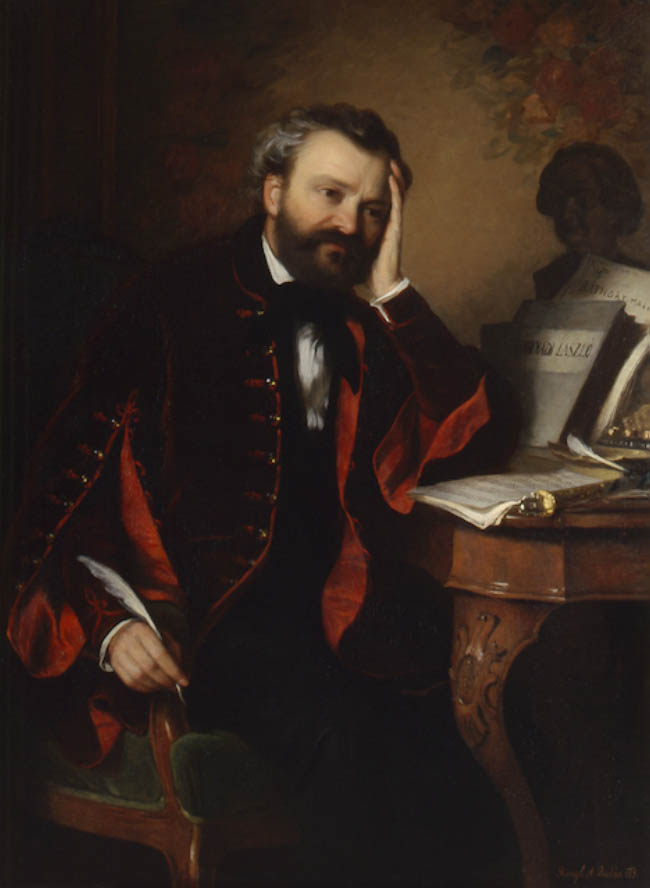
1850s painting of Erkel by Alajos Györgyi Giergl

Ferenc Erkel (Hungarian: Erkel Ferenc Hungarian pronunciation: [ˈɛrkɛl ˈfɛrɛnt͡s], German: Franz Erkel; November 7, 1810 – June 15, 1893) was a Hungarian composer, conductor and pianist. He was the father of Hungarian grand opera, written mainly on historical themes, which are still often performed in Hungary. He also composed the music of "Himnusz", the national anthem of Hungary, which was adopted in 1844. He died in Budapest.

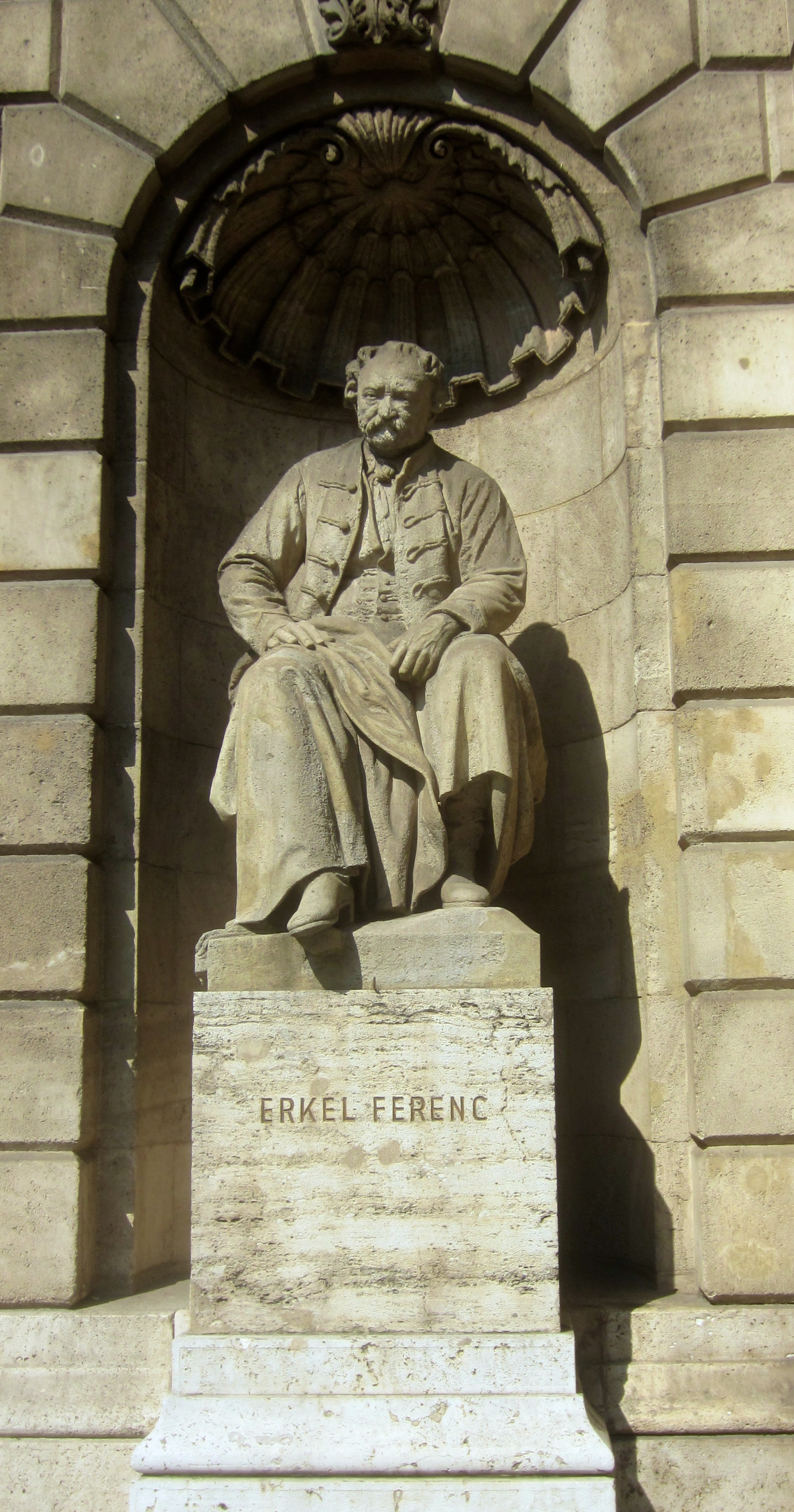
Statue of Ferenc Erkel at the Hungarian State Opera in Budapest by Alajos Stróbl.

== Biography ==
Erkel was born in Gyula to an originally Danube Swabian Erkel family, a son of Joseph Erkel who was a musician. His mother was the Hungarian Klára Ruttkay. The libretti of his first three operas were written by Béni Egressy. Beside his operas, for which he is best known, he wrote pieces for piano and chorus, and a majestic Festival Overture. He acquainted Hector Berlioz with the tune of the Rákóczi March, which Berlioz used in The Damnation of Faust.

He headed the Budapest Philharmonic Orchestra (founded in 1853). He was also the director and piano teacher of the Hungarian Academy of Music until 1886. The Hungarian State Opera House in Budapest was opened in 1884, of which he was the musical director.

In 1839, he married Adél Adlers. Four of his sons participated in the composing of his later operas:Nyíregyháza (July 4, 1842, Pest – March 22, 1909, Újpest), Elek (November 2, 1843, Pest – June 10, 1893, Budapest), László (April 9, 1844, Pest – December 3, 1896, Pozsony / Bratislava) and Sándor (January 2, 1846, Pest – October 14, 1900, Nyíregyháza).

== In popular culture ==
- Erkel was an internationally acknowledged chess player as well, and a founder of Pesti Sakk-kör (Budapest Chess Club).
- A department of the Opera House was established in 1911 in Budapest which also performs operas, named Erkel Színház (Erkel Theatre) since 1953.
- He was commemorated on gold and silver coins issued by the Hungarian National Bank for the 200th anniversary of his birth.

== Operas ==
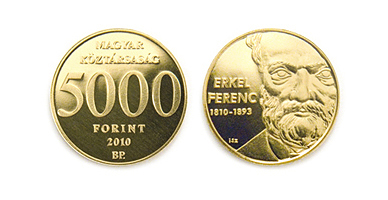
200th Anniversary of birth of Ferenc Erkel, memorial coin, Hungarian National Bank, 2010, designer László Szlávics, Jr.

- Bátori Mária (1840, two acts; Mária Bátori is the lover of István, son of Coloman of Hungary)
- Hunyadi László (1844, four acts)
- Erzsébet (1857, three acts, only the second is by Erkel)
- Bánk bán (1861, three acts; Bánk bán is a palatine of Andrew II) – this opera is often thought of as the national opera of Hungary
- Sarolta (1862, three acts)
- Dózsa György (1867, five acts)
- Brankovics György (1874, four acts)
- Névtelen hősök (1880, "Nameless heroes", four acts)
- István király (1885, "King Stephen", four acts)
- Kemény Simon (remained in fragments; planned to be of three acts)

== Chamber Music ==
- Duo brillant for Violin and Piano (1837) - ˙˙(Duo brillant en forme de Fantaisie sur des airs hongrois concertant pour piano et violon... par F. Erkel et H. Vieuxtemps.) IK.4.
- Verbunkos Fantasy for Viola and Piano (1890) IK. 47.

== See also ==
- Hungarian opera

Cultural offices
Preceded by None	Chief Conductor, Budapest Philharmonic Orchestra; 1853-1871	Succeeded by Sándor Erkel
