= Piano Concerto No. 2 (Bartók) =

Musical composition by Béla Bartók

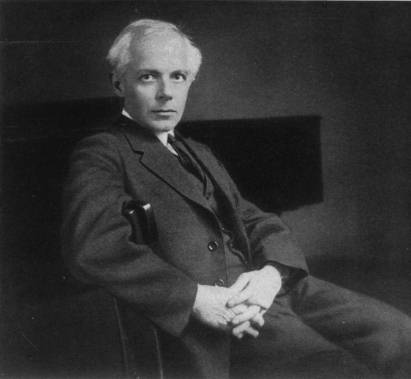
Béla Bartók in 1927

The Piano Concerto No. 2 in G major, Sz. 95, BB 101 of Béla Bartók is a musical composition for piano and orchestra. The work, which was composed between 1930 and 1931, is notorious for being one of the most difficult pieces in the repertoire. Playing time is 26–29 minutes.

== Composition ==
In approaching the composition, Bartók wanted the music to be more contrapuntal. He also wanted to simplify his music (like many of his contemporaries), but his use of counterpoint in this piece makes for an extremely complicated piece of music. This aspect had proven particularly troublesome in the First Concerto, so much so, in fact, that the New York Philharmonic, which was to have given the premiere, could not master it in time, and Bartók's Rhapsody had to be substituted into the program. The composer himself claimed in a 1939 article to have composed this concerto as a direct contrast to his First Concerto, acknowledging that the First "is a bit difficult — one might even say very difficult! — as much for orchestra as for audience."

Even so, the Second Concerto is notorious for its difficulty. András Schiff said, "For the piano player, it's a finger-breaking piece. [It] is probably the single most difficult piece that I have ever played, and I usually end up with a keyboard covered by blood." Stephen Kovacevich also declared that it was the most technically demanding piece he had ever played and that he nearly paralyzed his hands while preparing the piece.

The concerto was dated 1930/1931, but not premiered until 23 January 1933 in Frankfurt. The Frankfurt Radio Symphony was conducted by Hans Rosbaud with Bartók as the soloist. The first performance in Hungary was later that same year, conducted by Otto Klemperer with Louis Kentner playing the piano at Bartók's request.

Bartók himself played the work at a BBC Symphony Concert in the Queen's Hall on 8 November 1933, with the BBC Symphony Orchestra conducted by Adrian Boult. The concert was broadcast live and described in Radio Times as the first performance in England. Bartók played it again at the Proms in London under Sir Henry Wood on 7 January 1936, an initiative of the BBC music producer Edward Clark.

On 18 April 1934 he played it in Konserthuset with the Royal Stockholm Philharmonic Orchestra under Vàclav Talich.

The first performance in the United States was given in Chicago on 2 March 1939, with Storm Bull as soloist and the Chicago Symphony Orchestra conducted by Frederick Stock. The New York premiere was given at Carnegie Hall in 1947, with Andor Foldes as soloist and the National Orchestral Association conducted by Léon Barzin. The French premiere was given in 1945 by Yvonne Loriod, who had learnt it in only eight days.

== Music ==
The concerto is scored for an orchestra consisting of a solo piano, two flutes (one doubling on piccolo), two oboes, two clarinets (in B♭), two bassoons (one doubling on contrabassoon), four horns (in F), three trumpets (in C), three trombones, tuba, percussion (timpani, snare drum, bass drum, triangle, and cymbals), and strings.

The concerto is composed of three movements:

1. Allegro
2. Adagio — Presto — Adagio
3. Allegro molto — Più allegro

The overall form of the Second Concerto is symmetrical—the tempo structure is fast-slow-fast-slow-fast—in the Bartókian manner that has come to be identified as arch form. The first movement, marked Allegro, is highlighted by the active, punctuating piano solo. The piano's quick, rhythmic pace and fragmentary scalar movement suggest the influence of Igor Stravinsky, and the ballet Petrushka (1910–11) in particular, while other characteristics point to The Firebird; the main theme of the movement, introduced by the trumpets, is a reference to The Firebird's finale.

== Recordings ==
Some notable recordings are by:

- Andor Foldes (piano), Lamoureux Orchestra, Eugène Bigot (conductor). Recorded late 1940s. Polydor PLP 6620 (monaural LP recording, 12 in.) N.p.: Vox Polydor.
- Edith Farnadi (piano), Vienna State Opera Orchestra, Hermann Scherchen (conductor). Vega C-30-A-164 (monaural LP recording, 12 inch). [Paris]: Vega, 1954. Reissued on Westminster WL 5249 (monaural LP recording, 12 inch), New York: Westminster Records, 1954. Reissued again on Westminster XWN 18277 (monaural LP recording, 12 inch), New York: Westminster Records, 1956.
- György Sándor (piano), Pro Musica Orchestra, Vienna; Michael Gielen (conductor). Recorded in Vienna. Vox PL 11.490 (LP recording, 12 inch, monaural). New York: Vox Records, 1959.
- György Sándor (piano), Vienna Symphony Orchestra, Michael Gielen (conductor), recorded 1959
- John Ogdon (piano), BBC Symphony Orchestra, Pierre Boulez (conductor), Recorded live in Moscow, January 10, 1967
- Sviatoslav Richter (piano), Orchestre de Paris, Lorin Maazel (conductor), recorded 1969. EMI 3 50849
- Vladimir Ashkenazy (piano), Sir Georg Solti (conductor), London Philharmonic Orchestra, recorded 1979
- Zoltán Kocsis (piano), Iván Fischer (conductor), Budapest Festival Orchestra. Recorded February 1987 in Budapest. Philips 416 837-2 (Compact Disc).
- Yefim Bronfman (piano), Esa-Pekka Salonen (conductor), Los Angeles Philharmonic. Winner, Grammy Award for Best Instrumental Soloist Recording with Orchestra (1997). Recorded 1994–95 in Los Angeles. Sony Classical B000002AWA
- György Sándor (piano), Ádám Fischer (conductor), Hungarian State Orchestra
- Géza Anda (piano), Berlin Radio Symphony Orchestra (now called Deutsches Symphonie-Orchester Berlin), Ferenc Fricsay (conductor). Deutsche Grammophon 447 399-2
- Leif Ove Andsnes (piano), Berliner Philharmoniker, Pierre Boulez (conductor). Deutsche Grammophon 477 533-0
- Stephen Kovacevich (piano), BBC Symphony Orchestra, Sir Colin Davis (conductor). Philips 468 188-2
- Maurizio Pollini (piano), Chicago Symphony Orchestra, Claudio Abbado (conductor). Deutsche Grammophon 471 360-2
- Jenő Jandó, Budapest Symphony Orchestra unter András Ligeti, Naxos, 1994
- András Schiff (piano), Budapest Festival Orchestra, Iván Fischer (conductor), recorded April 1996 in Budapest at the Italian Cultural Institute. Sound engineer was Eberhard Sengpiel. Teldec 0630-13158-2 (Compact Disc).
- Alexis Weissenberg (piano), Philadelphia Orchestra, Eugene Ormandy (conductor). RCA B00000E6PC
- Georges Cziffra (piano), Budapest Symphony Orchestra, Mario Rossi (conductor). EMI References B000005GTO
- Lang Lang (piano), Berliner Philharmoniker, Simon Rattle (conductor). Recorded April 2013. Sony Classical 88883732262
- Jean-Efflam Bavouzet (piano), BBC Philharmonic, Gianandrea Noseda, (conductor) Recorded December 2009. April 2010 Chandos 10610
- Yuja Wang (piano), Berliner Philharmoniker, Simon Rattle (conductor). Recorded live in Wuhan 13 November 2017 (video), and in Tokyo 24 November 2017 (audio). Berliner Philharmoniker The Asia Tour
- László Borbély (piano), Savaria Symphony Orchestra, János Kovács (conductor), Recorded 21–24, November 2023, Bartók Concert Hall, Szombathely, Hungary, 2024 Hunnia Records & Film Production
- Tomáš Vrána (piano), Janáček Philharmonic Ostrava, Gábor Káli (conductor) Recorded June 2023. Released May 2025 on the Supraphon label. SU43602
