= Piano Concerto No. 1 (Bartók) =

Piano concerto by Béla Bartók

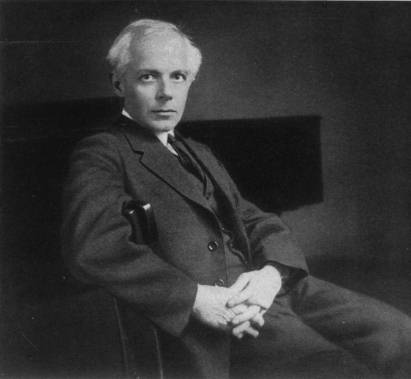
Béla Bartók in 1927

The Piano Concerto No. 1, Sz. 83, BB 91 of Béla Bartók was composed in 1926. Average playing time is between 23 and 24 minutes.

== Background ==
For almost three years, Bartók had composed little. He broke that silence with several piano works, one of which was the Piano Concerto, composed between August and November 1926.

== Premieres ==
The work was premiered at the fifth International Festival of the International Society for Contemporary Music in Frankfurt on July 1, 1927, with Bartók as the soloist and Wilhelm Furtwängler conducting.

The scheduled 1927 American premiere in Carnegie Hall by the New York Philharmonic, on a tour by Bartók, was canceled by conductor Willem Mengelberg due to insufficient rehearsing. Bartók's Rhapsody was substituted into the program. The Concerto eventually premiered in the USA on February 13, 1928 in the same venue, with Fritz Reiner conducting the Cincinnati Symphony Orchestra and Bartók as the soloist.

== Music ==
III. Allegro molto

The concerto is scored for an orchestra consisting of a solo piano, two flutes (one doubling on piccolo), two oboes (one doubling on cor anglais), two clarinets (one doubling on bass clarinet), two bassoons, four horns (in F), two trumpets (in C), three trombones, timpani, two snare drums (one with snares and one without), bass drum, four cymbals, triangle, tamtam, and strings.

There are three movements:

1. Allegro moderato – Allegro
2. Andante – attacca
3. Allegro molto

The concerto comes after an increased interest in Baroque music on the part of Bartók, which is demonstrated by such devices as the increased use of counterpoint. The work, however, retains the harshness and dissonance that is characteristic of Bartók. Here, as elsewhere in Bartók's output, the piano is used percussively. The importance of the other percussion instruments is illustrated by Bartók’s note: "The percussion (including timpani) must be placed directly next to the piano (behind the piano)." This note is omitted in a number of printed scores, restored in recent printings.

Bartók wrote of the concerto: "My first concerto ... I consider it a successful work, although its style is up to a point difficult, perhaps even very difficult for the orchestra and the public."

== Recordings ==
- Leonid Hambro (piano), Robert Mann (conductor), Zimbler Sinfonietta. LP recording, 1 sound disc: 33⅓ rpm, monaural, 12 in. Bartók Records 313, recorded 1958. New York: Bartók Records, 1959.
- György Sándor (piano), Rolf Reinhardt (conductor), Sudwestfunkorchester, Baden-Baden, LP recording, 1 sound disc: 33⅓ rpm, stereo, 12 in. Vox STPL 511.350. Paris: Vox, 1960. Reissued on 12-inch LP, Turnabout TV 340655, New York: Turnabout Records, [1970s].
- Géza Anda (piano), Ferenc Fricsay (conductor), Radio-Sinfonie-Orchester Berlin, LP recording, 1 sound disc: 33⅓ rpm, monaural, 12 in. DGG LPM 18708. [Hamburg]: Deutsche Grammophon, 1961. Reissued on CD, DG 447 399-2, Hamburg: Deutsche Grammophon, [n.d.], recorded 1960.
- Rudolf Serkin (piano), George Szell, conductor Columbia Symphony Orchestra, LP recording, 1 sound disc: 33⅓ rpm, stereo, 12 in. Columbia Masterworks MS 6405. New York: Columbia Masterworks, 1963.
- Peter Serkin (piano); Seiji Ozawa (conductor), Chicago Symphony Orchestra, LP recording, 1 sound disc: 33⅓ rpm, stereo, 12 in. RCA Victor LSC 2929. [New York]: RCA Victor, 1967.
- Kornel Zemplény (piano), János Ferencsik (conductor), Hungarian State Orchestra, LP recording, 1 sound disc: 33⅓ rpm, stereo, 12 in. Westminster WST 17003, New York: Westminster Records, [1960s]. Reissued on 12-in. LP, Music Guild MS 197, [N.p.]: Music Guild, 1970.
- Daniel Barenboim (piano), Pierre Boulez (conductor), New Philharmonia Orchestra, LP recording, 1 sound disc: 33⅓ rpm, stereo, 12 in. Angel S-36605. Hollywood: Angel, 1970.
- Zoltán Kocsis (piano), György Lehel (conductor), Budapest Symphony Orchestra, LP recording, 1 sound disc: 33⅓ rpm, stereo, 12 in. Hungaroton SLPX 11516, Béla Bartók Complete Edition: Orchestral Music 7, Budapest: Hengaroton, 1970.
- Stephen Bishop Kovacevich (piano), Colin Davis (conductor), London Symphony Orchestra, CD recording, 1 sound disc: digital, stereo, 4¾ in. Silver Line Classics. [Germany?]: Philips, 1990, recorded in London, 1975.
- Vladimir Ashkenazy (piano), Sir Georg Solti (conductor), London Philharmonic Orchestra, recorded 1981
- Zoltán Kocsis (piano), Iván Fischer (conductor), Budapest Festival Orchestra
- György Sándor (piano), Ádám Fischer (conductor), Hungarian State Orchestra
- Maurizio Pollini (piano), Claudio Abbado (conductor), Chicago Symphony Orchestra, DGG 415 371-2.
- Jenő Jandó, Budapest Symphony Orchestra unter András Ligeti, Naxos, 1994
- András Schiff, piano, Iván Fischer (conductor), Budapest Festival Orchestra, recorded April 1996 in Budapest in the Italian Cultural Institute. Eberhard Sengpiel (sound engineer).
- Krystian Zimerman (piano), Pierre Boulez (conductor), Chicago Symphony Orchestra. Deutsche Grammophon – 00289 477 5330. Germany, 2005.
- Jean-Efflam Bavouzet (piano), Gianandrea Noseda (conductor), BBC Philharmonic, Chandos, released 2010.
