= Melinda Kistétényi =

Hungarian classical organist and composer (1926–1999)

- Born: 25 July 1926; Budapest, Hungary
- Died: 20 October 1999 (aged 73); Budapest, Hungary
- Occupations: Classical organist, composer, chorus master and professor

Melinda Kistétényi (25 July 1926 – 20 October 1999) was a Hungarian classical organist, composer and chorus master known for her improvisations. She worked as a professor of music at the Franz Liszt Academy of Music in Budapest for 53 years.

== Early life and education ==
Melinda Kistétényi was born in Budapest on 25 July 1926. As a child, Kistétényi already developed a talent for music. When she was six, she improvised in the style of Mozart on a live radio programme. She attended the Institute of Englishwomen school in Budapest. From 1946 to 1953, she attended the Budapest Academy of Music, where she was taught composition by János Viski, organ by Sebestyén Pécsi, conducting by János Ferencsik, András Kórodi and László Somogyi and church music by Jenő Ádám and Lajos Bárdos. She received a chorus master diploma in 1949.

== Career ==
After receiving her chorus master's diploma, she began work as an assistant chorus master with the National Trade Unions Choir from 1952 to 1954 and then with the Choir of the Hungarian Home Office from 1954 to 1956. Kistétényi also worked as the deputy chorus master for the Central Choir of the Hungarian State Railways between 1958 and 1963.

Kistétényi was a professor of music theory at the Franz Liszt Academy of Music for 53 years from 1956 to 1989. In her teaching, she was one of the most prominent Hungarian followers of the Kodály method, and wrote poetic texts to Kodály's Epigrammák and Tricinia series. Her students include Andras Schiff, Zoltán Kocsis, Ivan Fischer, Dezső Ránki, Sylvia Sass, Xaver Varnus and Veronika Kincses. When Igor Stravinsky heard a recording of Kistétényi in the 1960s, he compared her to both Kodály and Béla Bartók.

In addition to teaching, she also performed regular organ concerts in Hungary and other countries. She usually dedicated the second half of her concerts to her improvisation. Kistétényi also translated many musical pieces into Hungarian, including Shakespeare's sonnets. She also set poems by Sándor Petőfi, Endre Ady, Gyula Juhász, Árpád Tóth, János Arany, Attila József, Sándor Weöres to music.

== Death ==
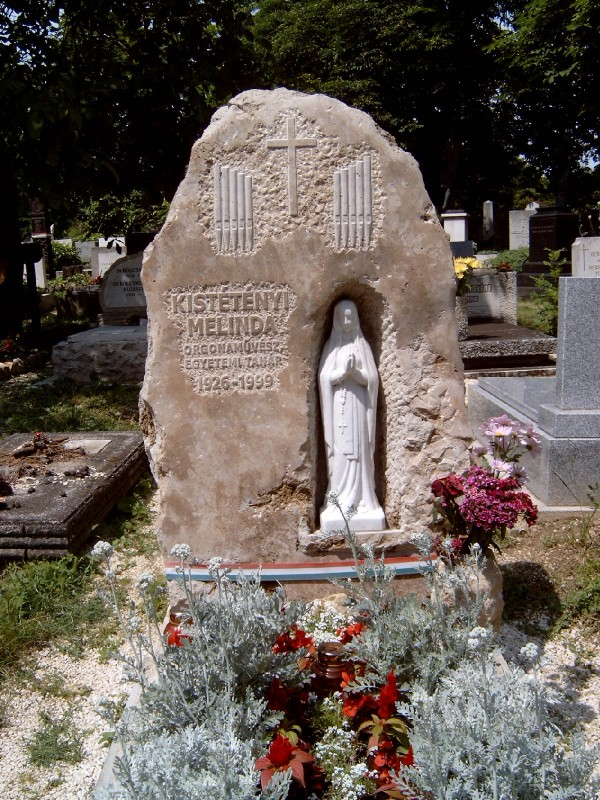
Melinda Kistétényi's grave

Kistétényi died on 20 October 1999 in Budapest, at the age of 73.

== Works ==
Selected works include:

- Gyászének (with Zoltán Kodály)
- Sonata for Solo Trombone
- Plaisirs, doux vainqueurs
- A csábító
- Már nem hívlak, kérlek
- Csöndesedj, vígaszt nyerj
- Hiába várod
- I call you all to Woden's hall
- Piu non cerca libertá

Kistétényi's works have been recorded and issued on CD, including:

- Contemporary Works with Trombone Label: Hungaraoton

Film appearances:

- Zenés TV színház (TV series) – Egy szerelem három éjszakája (1986) (musician: organ)
