= Music in Budapest =

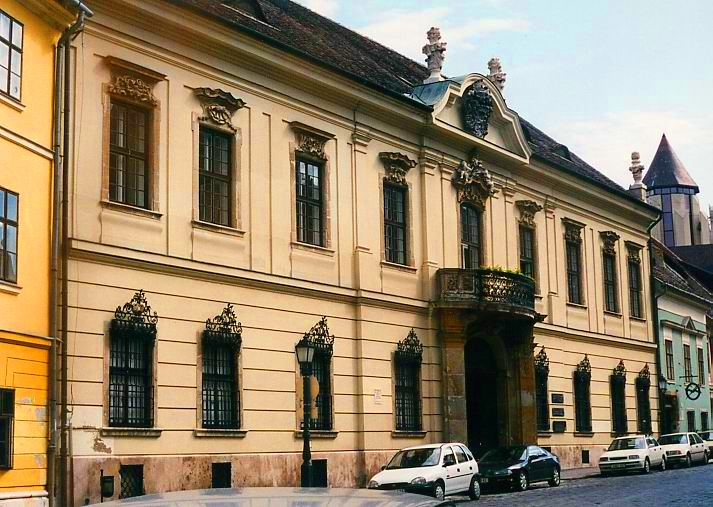
Music History Museum of Budapest

Budapest has long been an important part of the music of Hungary. The city has a rich musical culture, whether its Hungarian folk music, classical music, modern experimental, electronica, or alternative music. Prominent folk musicians and bands based in Budapest include Bársony Bálint, Héttorony Hangászok, and Berka . Its classical music history has included the composers Franz Liszt, Ernő Dohnányi, Zoltán Kodály and Béla Bartók.

== Folk Music ==
Some of the most important performers and preservers of traditional Hungarian folk music, dancing and costume culture are three main Folk Ensembles of Hungary, the State Folk Ensemble, the Hungaria Folk Ensemble, that continues on the tradition of the Rajkó Ensemble, and the Danube Folk Ensemble.

=== Hungarian State Folk Ensemble ===
During the more than five decades of its existence, the Ensemble has been working tirelessly at revitalizing the Hungarian folk culture. Because of their rich and colourful repertoire the State Ensemble is regarded as one of the top touring folk art groups in the world. It has performed in 44 countries across four continents and won the admiration of an audience of more than seven and a half million people. In the last few decades the Ensemble gained special interest in the United States and Canada—they were invited to undertake a three-month coast to coast American tour in 1994. They have also toured the Far East and Western Europe. The Ensemble consists of 30 dancers, 14 members of the Gipsy Orchestra and 5 members of the Hungarian Folk Orchestra. The choreographies are all based on authentic dances, some of them were collected in isolated villages with dance elements dating back hundreds of years.

The folk music that inspired Liszt, Bartók and Kodály is put on stage by both the Folk Orchestra and the world-famous Gipsy Orchestra. The 5 members of the Folk Orchestra play authentic, traditional instruments and perform Hungarian folk music at its highest artistic level. The famous Gipsy Orchestra accompanies dancers as well as performs alone. Their rich repertoire includes folk music that inspired Hungarian and international classical composers such as Liszt, Brahms, Kodály and Bartók. Aside from its performances around the country and abroad, the Ensemble gives approximately 90–100 performances annually at its home theatre at Corvin tér, the Budai Vigadó or Hungarian Heritage House.

=== Hungária Folk Ensemble (formerly known as Rajkó Folk Ensemble) ===
The Hungária Orchestra and Folk Ensemble, this is probably the most popular of the ensembles at home and especially abroad. They stand apart from the other two groups because they showcase elements of traditional Roma culture along with Hungarian folk music, dance and costume culture. This company was established in 1952. Their gift was born from the traditions of century old gipsy dynasties.

The exceptional professional skills of the Hungária are due to a special educational method that concentrates on preserving their natural aptitude for improvisation an essential precondition of virtuosity.

The Hungária Orchestra and Folk Ensemble perform as many musical and dance groups. The fifty plus main orchestra and the six to eight splinter chamber groups perform at various well-known venues. They are also adept at accompanying soloists and dance ensembles. They have often appeared on National Television and Radio and have a number of recordings.

This group of about sixty dancers was formed 50 years ago. They specialise in Hungarian folk dance but are equally able to perform operettas, ballet, and modern dance. The high professional attainment of the dancers is largely due to eight to ten years of intense training which begins at a very early age.

=== Danube Folk Ensemble ===
Founded in 1957, the Danube Folk Ensemble is one of the most highly regarded professional musical and dance groups in Hungary. The Ensemble consists of 24 professional dancers and 5 musicians. The Duna Dance Workshop, working with the Duna Art Ensemble, give theatrical interpretations of the Hungarian folk dance, leaving room for creative experimentation. The Göncöl Orchestra also gives individual concerts based on authentic folk music. The ensemble's goal is to perform genuine dances with dynamism and style, and to create innovative dance-theatre pieces on these principles. In addition to establishing a distinctive style through the vision of their artistic director, Zsolt Juhász, the ensemble regularly works together with noted guest choreographers.

The Danube Folk Ensemble's repertoire includes gems of Hungarian folk dance tradition, while Hungarian folk music is faithfully interpreted by its musicians. Varied and broad, the repertoire provides for several unique concerts. The ensemble gives over one hundred performances each year, including weekly shows at the Duna Palota and folklore and dance-theatre performances both in the theatres of Budapest and all over the country. Besides presenting its own repertoire, the ensemble has participated in various theatre productions such as János Vitéz—a musical tale, King Stephen, Attila—rock operas and the opera Dózsa György.

Their performances are often included at celebrations on national holidays. In the last 20 years the ensemble performed in England, Cuba, Poland, Australia, France, at the Sevilla Expo, in Finland, Romania, Austria, Switzerland and Italy.

The Hungarian State Folk Ensemble, the Danube Folk Ensemble and the Rajkó Folk Ensemble (founded in 1951, 1957 and 1952 respectively) are the three of the best Hungarian folk ensembles with the longest tradition in Hungary. They regularly give performances both in Hungary and abroad. Each ensemble consists of 30 artists.

== Classical music ==
Music institutions in modern Budapest include the Hungarian State Opera, the Franz Liszt Academy of Music and the Müpa Budapest. The major ensembles based in Budapest are the Budapest Festival Orchestra the Hungarian National Philharmonic, and the Hungarian Radio Symphony Orchestra. These and other orchestras based in Budapest hold most of their concerts at either Müpa Budapest or the Franz Liszt Academy of Music.

Music festivals in Budapest include the annual folk dance celebration Táncháztalálkozó, the Bartók Spring, Bridging Europe (A joint festival of Müpa Budapest and the Budapest Festival Orchestra held since 2013) and the Liszt Fest. Music venues include the Franz Liszt Academy of Music, Müpa Budapest, the Vigadó of Pest, Budapest Music Center and the House of Music Hungary.

=== Hungarian National Philharmonic ===
The story of the National Philharmonic Orchestra (Hungarian: Nemzeti Filharmonikus Zenekar) began in 1923, with the formation of the Metropolitan Orchestra, which quickly became one of the pillars of Hungarian musical life.

In the past few years, the orchestra has received a remarkable number of invitations to perform abroad. They have enjoyed immense success at venues as far apart as the New York Avery Fisher Hall, the Tokyo Suntory Hall, the Birmingham Symphony Hall, the Athenian Megaron Musicos or the Colmar Festival. ConcertoNet, the distinguished online classical music journal, nominated the orchestra's concert in New York in February 2003 as the winner of the Lully Prize for the best concert of the season.

Under the artistic direction of Zoltán Kocsis, the National Philharmonic undertook a complete Bartók recording project for the Hungaroton label, launched in 2006. The first recordings from this new series were released in December 2006 under the title the Kossuth Symphony and The Wooden Prince. This SACD received important international critical acclaim (Diapason d'or, Pizzicato Supersonic Prize etc.). The second one was released in September 2007 with a new recording of the Violin Concerto op. posth. and earlier recordings of Rhapsody op. 1 and Scherzo op. 2.

On 1 December 2006, the Hungarian National Philharmonic was appointed Hungarian Goodwill Ambassador of UNICEF by its Hungarian National Committee.

The National Philharmonic is the Resident Orchestra at Müpa Budapest. Their current Music Director is György Vashegyi.

=== Budapest Festival Orchestra ===
The Budapest Festival Orchestra (Hungarian: Budapesti Fesztiválzenekar; BFZ) was founded in 1983 by Iván Fischer and Zoltán Kocsis. Iván Fischer has been the BFO's Music Director since its founding.

The BFO was recognized by Gramophone Magazine as their Orchestra of the Year in 2022; and a panel of critics conducted by Bachtrack in 2023 found the BFO the 8th best orchestra in the world, along with Iván Fischer, the BFO's Music Director as the 6th best conductor in the world.

==== The cimbalom ====
The cimbalom is an insturment descended from the Persian santur. It is equipped with a heavy frame for more dynamic power and many added string courses for an extended range of sounds and a damper pedal to allow more dynamic control.

== Ethnic and world music ==
=== Budapest Klezmer Band ===
Klezmer music originates from the Ashkenazi Jews of Eastern Europe. The Budapest Klezmer Band was founded in 1990. They play musical arrangements, composed by the founder and musical director of the ensemble, Ferenc Jávori. Jávori learned and played klezmer with the last surviving musicians from a once flourishing community where klezmer music was an integral part of Jewish life. Other members of the band are also highly regarded musicians, having graduated from the Franz Liszt Academy of Music.

The Band also takes part in theatrical productions. They are featured in the ballet production PURIM, The Casting of Fate, and in Fiddler on the Roof at the Madách Theater in Budapest. Their performances with the famous Franz Liszt Chamber Orchestra playing at the Academy of Music in Budapest were successful and were called an important step towards bringing klezmer music to the classical concert hall. In 2000 the Pro Cultura Foundation of the Hungarian Academy of Sciences awarded the Kodály Zoltán Cultural Prize to the Budapest Klezmer Band for promoting and spreading Yiddish musical tradition, and in August 2003 the band was awarded the Artisjus Prize.

=== Ando Drom ===
In 1993 Jenő Zsigó created the Ando Drom Foundation, for the purpose of promoting Romany art, helping to motivate young talent, and to allow the Romany encounter their own culture within the community, through the productions of the band Ando Drom, among others, a group pioneering the reinterpretation of Romany music and dance. Their music is contemporary in nature. Besides authentic Romany folk songs, they play a kind of urban Romany music which gives a voice to the present-day reality of the community. They avoid reconstructing the manners of old musicians and singers or their style.

Between 1987 and 2005 the group performed in many European countries, including France (Strasbourg, Lille, Paris, Nantes, Confolens, Reims, Millou, Donquerg), Spain (Badajoz, Cadiz), Germany (Nünberg, Frankfurt, Berlin, Rudolstadt, Offenburg) Sweden (Falun and concertour) Finland (Tampere) Dania (Koppenhága, concertour) Portugalia (concertourne and Lisszabon, Porto, Evora) Italy (Róma, Pavia, Parma, Locarno) Israel (Jeruzsálem, Akko) Austria (Vienna, St. Gallen) Belgium (Gent, Brussels) Greece (Thessaloniki and concerttours) Hollandia (concertours), England (London), and participated at many international festivals (Gypsy Swing Festival of Angers, Inteatro Theater Festival in Ancona, Festival Mosaigue Gitane in Arles, Okarina Ethno Festival Slovenia, Festival di Musica da Osteria, Udine Italy, Festival of Falun, Festival of Rudolstadt, WDR Festival Köln. etc.

=== Beshodrom ===
The band was formed in 1999, they draw their musical basis from Transylvanian Roma music as well as Jewish, Lebanese, Armenian, Bulgarian, Romanian and Greek folk music combined with electronica.

== Electronica and experimental ==
=== Cökxpôn Ambient Society ===
The Ambient Society is a nonprofit organization that works towards supporting young artists and musicians as well as working towards cultural, environmental and social goals. The partys and club nights have a family atmosphere and are dedicated to musical experimentation.

The Cökxpôn Radio exists from 2003 for to introduce the contemporary artists, and give information about the actual programs of the team at Tilos Radio, every Wednesday 3–4 pm.

The Society opened its Cultural Centre, the Cökxpôn Café Theatre in downtown Pest in June 2007, represents a European holistic vision, and embraces all the team's projects. They have since moved to a new location in the artsy downtown area of Budapest. The center continues to be a meeting point of Hungarian and international contemporary artists of popular and periferic genres and their audience within the framework of a complex: multicultural café-teahouse-exhibition space, theatre-concert room, workplace for rehearsals and workshops and office.

==== Tilos Rádió ====
Tilos Rádió is a nonprofit, community radio station supported by listeners. It was originally a pirate radio ("Tilos" means "Forbidden" in Hungarian). It played a key role in the liberalization of the Hungarian airwaves in 1995. Tilos is a key player in the cultural and lifestyle scene of Budapest. Meanwhile, Tilos Rádió has its fingers on the public pulse with its social thinking, minority oriented programmes, and its radical and tolerant attitude. Tilos' broadcasts are mainly financed by listeners' donations and the income from fund-raising events,

=== A38 ===
The Artemovszk 38 was a Ukrainian stone carrying vessel. It has since been converted to a club and concert venue located at the Buda foot of the Petőfi Bridge in Budapest. It is one of Budapest's most important clubs and according to artists and audiences, one of the "coolest clubs in Europe."

The ship features a wide variety of alternative, rock and electronic music. It is popular not only with locals, but serves as an attraction for young people visiting Budapest.
