= Felix Chen =

Taiwanese conductor and violinist (1942–2018)

Felix Chen 陳秋盛
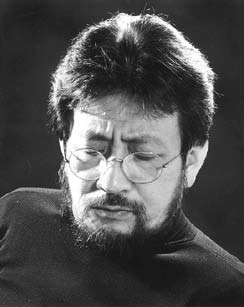

Background information
- Birth name: Chen Chiu-sen
- Born: 9 July 1942; Taihoku, Taiwan, Empire of Japan
- Died: 9 April 2018 (aged 75); Taipei, Taiwan
- Genres: Western Classical
- Occupation: Conductor
- Instrument: Violin
- Years active: 1971–2014

Felix Chen or Chen Chiu-sen (Chinese: 陳秋盛; pinyin: Chén Qiūshèng; 9 July 1942 – 9 April 2018) was a Taiwanese conductor and violinist. He was resident conductor and music director of the Taipei Symphony Orchestra from 1986 until his dismissal in 2003. He taught both Chien Wen-pin, musical director of the Taiwan National Symphony Orchestra from 2001 to 2007; and the same orchestra's current maestro, Lü Shao-chia.

== Early life ==
Chen was born in Taihoku Prefecture, Taiwan on 9 July 1942. He began his musical career studying the violin, and won first prize in Taiwan's provincial violin competition in 1959. Later, he studied at the Munich Conservatory in Germany. He returned to Taiwan in 1969 and played violin in several orchestras.

== Career ==
=== Early career ===
In 1971, Chen moved to Austria to study conducting, returning again to Taiwan in 1973 to work for the Taiwan Provincial Symphony Orchestra. He later moved to the Taipei Symphony Orchestra (TSO), which he led for 17 years. He began staging operas with them. In this era, the TSO had not yet begun to stage operas; consequently, Chen's were almost the only Western operas known at that time in Taiwan. He was praised for his work at the podium conducting both orchestral and operatic works. Every year Chen and the TSO produced one or two operas (among them Aida, Otello and Turandot) which became major musical events in Taiwan.

In a 2003 article in the Taipei Times newspaper, Chen was described as "a veritable Taiwanese 'living national treasure'", due to his "long line of magnificent concerts and opera productions."

=== Later career ===
After his retirement, Chen taught at the National Taiwan Normal University, Taipei National University of the Arts, and Tainan National University of the Arts. He was invited to give guest performances with the National Symphony Orchestra of Taiwan (NSO) and the National Taiwan Symphony Orchestra in his later years. The conductors Lü Shao-chia and Chien Wen-pin were both students of Chen.

In March 2014, Chen came out of retirement and for the first time publicly praised Shen Yun Performing Arts for their "staging techniques" while reflecting that the institution deserved its reputation.

=== Firing ===
In September 2003, Chen was accused of corruption and involvement in a forgery scandal. As a result, the Department of Culture Affairs of the Taipei City Government decided to relieve him of his post. Chen eventually chose to retire, and some people believed he was forced to do so. In 2010, the Taipei Times asserted that "according to many in Taipei's classical music scene, not a shred of evidence involving Chen in any wrongdoing was ever discovered." Chen meanwhile returned to university teaching, making occasional appearances as a guest conductor.

== Death ==
Chen died on 9 April 2018 in Taipei at the age of 75.

== Partial discography ==
- Ritual Incantations
- Concerto for Cello and Orchestra in B Minor, Op. 104: I. Allegro
- Concerto for Cello and Orchestra in B Minor, Op. 104: II. Adagio ma non troppo
- Concerto for Cello and Orchestra in B Minor, Op. 104: III. Finale: Allegro moderato
- Ritual Incantations: I. Majestic: Driving and Persistent — Cantabile
- Ritual Incantations: II. Mysterious and Expansive — Longing — Yearning
- Ritual Incantations: III. Spirited — Passionate — Bold and Lyrical
