= Eliahu Inbal =

Israeli conductor (born 1936)

- אליהו ענבל
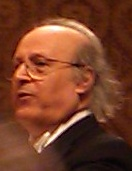
- Eliahu Inbal
- Born: 16 February 1936 (age 90); Jerusalem, Mandatory Palestine
- Occupation: Conductor
- Known for: Interpretations and recordings of Bruckner, Mahler and Shostakovich symphonies
- Awards: Officer of the Ordre des Arts et des Lettres (1990); Officer's Cross of the Order of Merit of the Federal Republic of Germany (2006)

Eliahu Inbal (Hebrew: אליהו ענבל; born 16 February 1936, Jerusalem) is an Israeli conductor. Inbal has enjoyed a career of international renown, conducting leading orchestras around the world. He has conducted a wide variety of works. He is best known for his interpretations of late-Romantic works, but is also noted as an opera conductor.

== Early life and education ==
Inbal studied violin at the Israeli Academy of Music and took composition lessons with Paul Ben-Haim. Upon hearing him there, Leonard Bernstein endorsed a scholarship for Inbal to study conducting at the Conservatoire de Paris, and he also took courses with Sergiu Celibidache and Franco Ferrara in Hilversum, Netherlands. At Novara, he won first prize at the 1963 Guido Cantelli conducting competition at the age of 26.

Inbal made most of his early appearances in Italy, but a successful British debut in 1965 with the London Philharmonic led to a number of other engagements with British orchestras. He subsequently worked with a number of orchestras throughout Europe and in America, and eventually took joint British citizenship.

Gustav Mahler Symphony no. 1, second movement, excerpt from a 1995 recording with the Frankfurt Radio Symphony

== Conductor of the Frankfurt Radio Symphony ==
From 1974 to 1990, he was the principal conductor of the Frankfurt Radio Symphony. With them, he was the first to record the original versions of several of Anton Bruckner's symphonies, for which he won the Deutscher Schallplattenpreis. He also has recorded two complete cycles each of the symphonies of Gustav Mahler and Dmitri Shostakovich. From 1984 to 1989, he was chief conductor at La Fenice in Venice. From 2003 to 2011, he conducted a series of the complete symphonies of Bruckner at the Rheingau Musik Festival with the WDR Symphony Orchestra Cologne, concluding with the unfinished Ninth Symphony. He was appointed music director of La Fenice in January 2007.

== Chief Conductor of the Czech Philharmonic ==
From 2009 to 2012, Inbal served as the chief conductor of the Czech Philharmonic. Inbal also served as the principal conductor of the Tokyo Metropolitan Symphony Orchestra from 2008 to 2014, and is the conductor laureate of the orchestra.

== 2014 and 2016 ==
In 2014, Inbal was named as conductor laureate of the Tokyo Metropolitan Symphony Orchestra. In 2016, he was a guest conductor with the Stuttgart Radio Symphony Orchestra. In 2017, he conducted at the Philharmonie de Paris.

== Chief conductor of the Taipei Symphony Orchestra ==
In August 2019, Inbal began his tenure as the chief conductor of the Taipei Symphony Orchestra with a contract of three years. His contract was extended in April 2022, although he decided in June to leave the orchestra when his original term expired.

Following his retirement as chief conductor of the Taipei Symphony Orchestra, Inbal became conductor laureate of the orchestra in 2023.

== Awards ==
Inbal is an officer of the Ordre des Arts et des Lettres (1990) in France and was awarded the Officer's Cross of the Order of Merit of the Federal Republic of Germany (2006). He was awarded the Goethe Plaque of the City of Frankfurt in 2006.

Cultural offices
| Preceded by Michael Schønwandt | Principal conductor, Konzerthausorchester Berlin; 2001–2006 | Succeeded by Lothar Zagrosek |
| Preceded by James DePreist (Permanent conductor) | Principal conductor, Tokyo Metropolitan Symphony Orchestra; 2008–2014 | Succeeded by Kazushi Ono |
| Preceded by Gilbert Varga | Principal conductor, Taipei Symphony Orchestra; 20019–2022 | Succeeded by Alexander Liebreich |
