= Li I-ching =

Taiwanese musician (born 1977)

Li I-ching (Chinese: 李宜錦, born December 18, 1977) is a Taiwanese violinist. She is the youngest concertmaster in the history of National Symphony Orchestra (NSO).

After Li graduated from Kaohsiung Senior High School, she went to New England Conservatory of Music and studied under the guidance of James Buswell. During her stay in the United States, she was invited to perform in debut of several American modern composers' works, such as Alan Fletcher, John Corigliano, and John Harbison. She also took part in master classes of Nobuko Imai, Zakhar Bron, Gil Shaham, and Pinchas Zukerman.

Li finished her bachelor's and master's degrees in the U.S. and returned to Taiwan in 2002. She entered NSO as associate concertmaster. In the same year, she won the Outstanding Artist Award presented by the National Tsing Hua University. Li became NSO's concertmaster in 2004.

Li has been performing in music festivals as a soloist, concertmasters, and orchestra section members all over the world, including Tanglewood Music Festival, Pacific Music Festival, Sarasota Music Festival, Summit Music Festival, Scheleswig-Holstein Orchestral Academy, Banff Music Festival, and many others. She has worked with great maestros such as Seiji Ozawa, James Levine, Christoph Eschenbach, Eksabela Solemann, Chien Wen-pin, etc.
