= Shih (composer) =

Shih (born 29 November 1950 in Taipei, Taiwan) is a naturalized Austrian composer. Shih has been living and working in Vienna since 1974. In Europe Shih forgoes his full Chinese name due to experience with incorrect writing and pronunciation. However, in Taiwan he is still known by his full name Shih Chieh (Chinese 施捷).

== Early life and education ==
Shih was born on 29 November 1950 in Taipei, Taiwan. Shih studied composition and harp at the Vienna University for Music and Performing Arts, graduating in 1983.

== Career ==
He has been living and working in Vienna since 1974 as a freelance composer, teacher, and artistic director of the Pacific Youth Orchestra Vienna, founded in 2002. He has been awarded special merits for regularly presenting contemporary Austrian music in China.

His own works – chamber music, ballet, lied, orchestra works, opera and oratorio – have been performed in many European und Asian countries, as well as in the United States, and regularly appear both on TV and radio (ORF, ARD, MDR, RAI etc.). Shih's international breakthrough came with his opera „Vatermord“ ("Death of a Father"), first performed in Dresden in 1994 and followed by performances at Leipzig Oper and in Nuremberg, Erlangen, Vienna and Berlin.

Further important steps include the oratorio, „Lebend’ges Land“, in Münster; the music-installation, "Prayer", in Taiwan (on the occasion of the centennial of the Republic of China); and the open-ended cycle, „Ein Takt für...“ ("A Measure for..."), which established Shih's individual style of transforming psychical processes into music for all existing instruments, either in solo performance or in combination with others.

== Musical style ==
The music critic Dr. Christian Baier has described Shih's intentions as the "search for form as well as formal scepticism, richness of expression as well as absolute restraint and austerity. His music allows the performer rich space for free interpretation".

Shih himself explains: "My music is not traditional, but conscious of tradition. As a composer, I am part of a long tradition, and I have to deal with this tradition. Of course I can turn my back, say farewell to tradition and live wholly for the experiment. But in doing so, one soon becomes lonely – not only as a human being, but also as an artist. It is necessary to be conscious of one’s cultural-historical past to arrive at an artistic, i.e. individual present."

== List of compositions ==
- 1981: Epitaph I (flute, oboe, clarinet and basson)
- 1982: Dancing Song – for flute and seven percussion instruments
- 1983: Dejaviews (three Dance Pieces for Two) – for Piano
- 1983: The Night of 15. August – Symphony in three Movements
- 1983: Drei Lieder - 3 poems from Li Ho for Soprano and Piano
- 1983: Dance Suite – for strings, flute and harp
- 1984: Hera or The Search for Manis - for strings orchestra
- 1984: Sonata – for violoncello
- 1987: Nestor’s dream - for flute
- 1988: Triptych in L (clarinet, violoncello and piano)
- 1989: A Measure for clarinet and piano
- 1989: Spuren. ("Traces") 4 Lieder on poems of Franz Hrastnik for lower voice and piano
- 1990: Epitaph II (clarinet, basset, horn, Wagner tuba, 2 bassoons)
- 1991: A Measure for flute and organ
- 1991: A Measure for piano
- 1991: A Measure for violoncello
- 1992: A Measure for violin and piano
- 1993: A Measure for harp and string quartet
- 1994: Vatermord (Death of a Father). Chamber opera in nine episodes
- 1995: ...Night falls upon the River (Part I of River-Trilogy). Symphonic music based on themes of Marguerite Duras
- 1995: A Measure for alto saxophone and organ
- 1996: Crossing the River (Part II of River-Trilogy). Chamber music episode on themes of Marguerite Duras
- 1996: The last waltz - for Piano
- 1997: Lebend'ges Land / Living Country oratorio for soloists, two mixed choirs, children's choir and orchestra
- 1997: Secession. Dialogue for guitar and the other twelve
- 1999: A Measure for guitar
- 1999: A Measure for saxophone quartet
- 2001: A Measure for viola and piano
- 2002: A Measure for pi-pa and string quartet
- 2004: A Measure for harp
- 2004: A Measure for two pianos and two percussion players
- 2005: A Measure for clarinet and string quartet
- 2005: A Measure for piano and four strings
- 2005: A Measure for pi-pa
- 2005: The Separation (Part III of River-Trilogy). Symphonic music in one movement based on themes of Marguerite Duras
- 2006: A Measure for nine (Violin, viola da gamba, erhu, guitar, pi-pa, lute, clarinet / bass clarinet, Harpsichord, percussions)
- 2008: A Measure for saxophone and accordion
- 2008: A Measure for any string and three percussion players
- 2009: Requiem for piano, string orchestra and membranophones
- 2010: Wanderschaft (Wanderings) symphonic song on a poem by Georg Trakl for soprano and chamber orchestra
- 2011: Prayer – sound installation for a vocalist, two female choirs, two children’s choirs, orchestra and 72 timpani
- 2012: A Measure for six percussion instruments and one player (marimba, vibraphone, crotales set, 3 bongos, cymbal, conga)
- 2015: Silent Sea, sound installation for large orchestra, mixed choir and children's choir (poems of Shih)
- 2015: Dancing Sea, sound installation for 11 players
- 2018: Clouds and Waves, sound sculpture for chamber orchestra, mixed choir and children's choir (poem by Rabindranath Tagore)
- 2021: A Measure for Trombone
- 2023: A Measure for Tuba and Piano
- 2024: A Measure for Trombone and Piano

== Prizes and awards ==
- 1984: Fellowship of Alban Berg Foundation
- 1985: Prize-winner in the Composing Competition of the Republic of China
- 1994: "Blaue Brücke" Composition Award of Dresden Center for Contemporary Music (for his opera "Vatermord")
- 2005: Gold medal for services to the City of Vienna

== Selected recordings ==
- Shih: Kammermusik - Die Überquerung des Flusses; Ein Takt für Neun; Ein Takt für Klavier & 4 Streicher; Wanderschaft; Die Trennung. Anu Komsi (soprano), Annika Vavic (piano), Ensemble "Die Reihe"; National Symphony Orchestra of Taiwan, Georg Fritzsch, Chien Wen-Pin Capriccio (record label), 2010
