= Wu Ting-yu =

Taiwanese violinist

Wu Ting-yu (Chinese: 吳庭毓) is a Taiwanese violinist. He currently serves as the concertmaster in Taiwan's leading National Symphony Orchestra.

Born in Kaohsiung, Wu began to study violin at age of 5 with his father, Wu Lian-jing, a prestigious painter and violinist. Since then, he had studied with some of Taiwan's most renowned violinists. In 1982, Wu graduated with the highest honor from the National Academy of Arts (later renamed as National Taiwan University of Arts). He later served as the concertmaster of National Defense Symphony Orchestra and Taipei Symphony Orchestra. In 1988, he entered the Ville de Rueil-Malmaison Conservatoire in France under the guidance of Prof. Melle Brignon. Upon returning to Taiwan, he was appointed as the concert master of National Symphony Orchestra. He has since then performed as a soloist with many orchestras throughout the world. In 2000, Wu was invited to perform at the presidential palace for the President of R.O.C. He was also invited by the French Consulate to perform at the Art Exhibition festival in Taipei. In 2002, he recorded, as the soloist, Vivaldi's The Four Seasons with Philharmonic Chamber Orchestra of Moscow. At the same time, Wu is committed to educate the young talents in Taiwan. He is currently an associate professor at Fu Jen Catholic University, National Chiao Tung University, and National Taiwan University of Arts.
