= Ken'ichiro Kobayashi =

Japanese composer and conductor (born 1940)

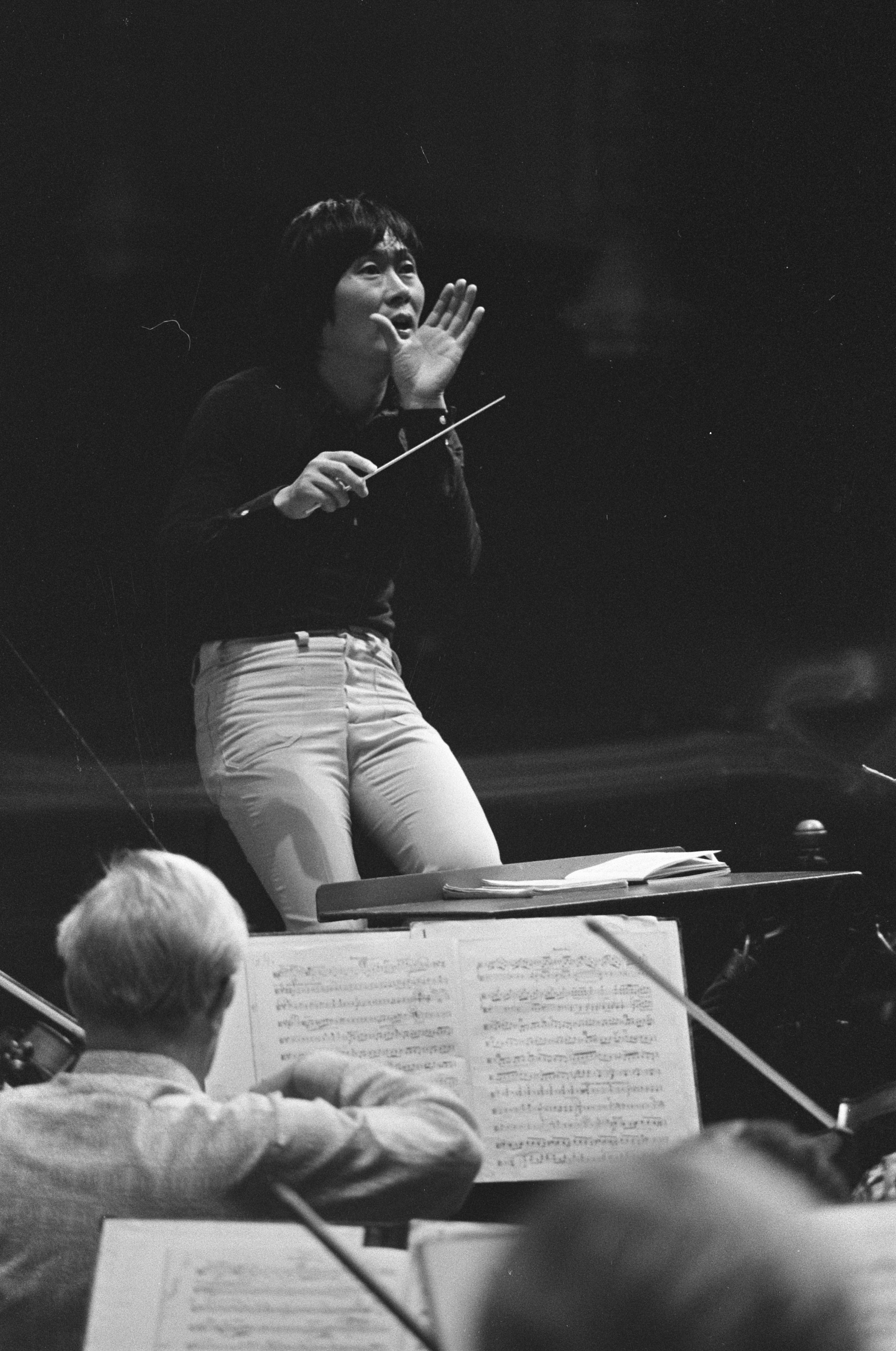
- Ken Kobayashi conducting the Royal Concertgebouw Orchestra in 1975
- Born: 9 April 1940 (age 86); Iwaki, Fukushima Prefecture, Japan
- Occupation: conductor

Ken'ichiro Kobayashi (小林 研一郎, Kobayashi Ken'ichirō; born 9 April 1940) is a Japanese conductor and composer. In Japan he is known among his fans as “Kobaken.”

== Biography ==
Born in Iwaki, Fukushima, Kobayashi's father was a high school music teacher, and mother was a primary school teacher. Kobayashi started composing music at the age of 11, studied composition and conducting under Mareo Ishiketa (composition), Kazuo Yamada (conducting), and Akeo Watanabe (conducting) at Tokyo University of the Arts.

Kobayashi won the 1st prize and the special award at the International Conductors Competition on Hungarian television in 1974. He has led orchestras in Germany, Austria, Britain, and Netherlands. Kobayashi has been resident conductor of the Tokyo Metropolitan Symphony Orchestra and Kyoto Symphony Orchestra. Kobayashi was appointed to the principal conductor of Japan Philharmonic Orchestra (1988–90), chief conductor (1990–94, 1997–2004), music director (2004–07) and conductor laureate since 2010.

Kobayashi served the principal guest conductor of the Kansai and Kyushu Orchestras. He was general music director of Nagoya Philharmonic Orchestra from 1998 to 2001, music director from 2001 to 2003, is now appointed to the conductor laureate since 2003. Kobayashi was appointed to the special guest conductor of Yomiuri Nippon Symphony Orchestra in August 2011, appointed to the music director of Tokyo Bunka Kaikan in June 2012.

In Europe, Kobayashi served the principal conductor of Hungarian State Symphony (now Hungarian National Philharmonic) from 1987–97, and is now conductor laureate of the orchestra. Kobayashi was the first Asian conductor who had conducted Czech Philharmonic at the Prague Spring International Music Festival in 2002. He has held the regular guest conductorship with Czech Philharmonic. He was one of three conductors who primarily led the orchestra after the resignation of Gerd Albrecht from the chief conductorship orchestra in 1996 and before advent of Vladimir Ashkenazy in 1998.

In 2006, he became vaste dirigent ('permanent conductor') of Het Gelders Orkest of Arnhem, Netherlands. He is the emeritus professor of Tokyo University of the Arts, of Tokyo College of Music, and of Franz Liszt Academy of Music.

His compositions include his Passacaglia for orchestra, in honour of the 400th anniversary of relations between Japan and the Netherlands in the year 2000.

Kobayashi received the Liszt Memorial Decoration (1986), the Hungarian Order of Culture (1990), and the Middle Cross with the Star of the Order of the Republic of Hungary decoration (the highest civilian honour) from the Hungarian government in 1994. He is the ambassador of Culture for Hungary.

In 2000, he was awarded the Hanno R. Ellenbogen Citizenship Award jointly given by the Prague Society for International Cooperation and Global Panel Foundation.

Cultural offices
Preceded by János Ferencsik	Principal Conductor, Hungarian National Philharmonic Orchestra; 1987–1997	Succeeded by Zoltán Kocsis
Preceded by Taijiro Iimori (permanent conductor)	General Music Director and Music Director, Nagoya Philharmonic Orchestra; 1998–2001 (General Music Director), 2001–2003 (Music Director)	Succeeded by Ryusuke Numajiri (chief conductor)
