= Hungarian National Philharmonic =

Orchestra based in Budapest, Hungary

The Hungarian National Philharmonic Orchestra (Hungarian: Nemzeti Filharmonikus Zenekar; formerly, the Hungarian State Symphony Orchestra, Hungarian: Magyar Állami Hangversenyzenekar) is one of symphony orchestras in Hungary. Based in the capital city of Budapest, it has stood as one of the pillars of the country's musical life since its founding in 1923 as the Metropolitan Orchestra (Hungarian: Székesfővárosi Zenekar). Their home is in the Palace of Arts in Budapest, and their permanent chief music director is Zoltán Kocsis.

György Vashegyi is the current musical director.

== History ==
The Hungarian National Philharmonic Orchestra, one of the country's leading symphonic orchestras, will celebrate its centenary in the spring of 2023.

The Budapest Philharmonic Orchestra was founded in 1923 and quickly became a leading ensemble in the city's musical life. Its founder and chief conductor, Dezső Bor, led the orchestra for fifteen years. Following World War II, the ensemble was directed by Ferenc Fricsay and László Somogyi. Otto Klemperer conducted the orchestra on more than forty occasions, while Antal Doráti and Lajos Rajter also frequently appeared on the podium.

In 1952, the orchestra was renamed the Hungarian State Concert Orchestra, and János Ferencsik was appointed chief conductor. Under his leadership, the ensemble not only became Hungary's leading symphony orchestra but also gained international recognition, performing frequently and to great acclaim abroad. The orchestra's growing prestige was reflected in the return of world-renowned guest conductors from the 1960s onwards, including Ernest Ansermet, Antal Doráti, Zubin Mehta, Lorin Maazel, Sir John Barbirolli, Leopold Stokowski, Claudio Abbado, and Christoph von Dohnányi. Celebrated soloists also appeared regularly with the orchestra, among them Sviatoslav Richter, Yehudi Menuhin, Anja Silja, János Starker, and Ruggiero Ricci.

Following the death of János Ferencsik in 1984, Ken-Ichiro Kobayashi was appointed principal conductor of the ensemble in 1987. Kobayashi had won the First Hungarian Television International Conducting Competition in 1974 and studied under Ferencsik for several years, serving as the orchestra's assistant conductor. The Japanese maestro led the orchestra until 1992, when he was awarded the title of perpetual honorary president-conductor.

Following the eras marked by the leadership of János Ferencsik and Ken-Ichiro Kobayashi, a new chapter in the history of the orchestra began in 1997, when Zoltán Kocsis was named chief music director. Over the course of the next two decades, the orchestra performed not only the classics, but also important works previously missing from the repertoire and, with the versatility worthy of a renewed national symphonic ensemble, introducing its audience to the Hungarian music of the recent past and today. During the period after Kocsis's death, from March 2017 to August 2020, the post of music director was held by the Liszt Award-winning Zsolt Hamar, who had contributed to the orchestra for many years as first permanent conductor while also pursuing a serious international career.

Since the fall of 2022 and the start of the ensemble's jubilee season, the musicians have been guided by their new general music director, György Vashegyi.

Vashegyi has taught at the Liszt Academy since 1992, currently serving as an associate professor and director of the Early Music Departmental Group founded under his leadership in 2010. In recognition of his work, he received the Liszt Award in 2008 and the Knight's Cross of the Hungarian Order of Merit, Civil Division in 2015. In 2021, the French state awarded him the honorary title of Chevalier de L’Ordre des Arts et des Lettres.

On the occasion of Hungary's national holiday on 15 March 2024, in recognition of his valuable work as an artist and in artistic public life, he was the country's highest state decoration, he was awarded the Kossuth Prize.

Over the past decades, the Hungarian National Philharmonic Orchestra has given nearly 330 foreign concerts while touring in some 40 countries. During Kocsis's tenure, they performed at such renowned venues and festivals as New York's Avery Fisher Hall, Tokyo's Suntory Hall, Birmingham's Symphony Hall, the Megaron in Athens, Bucharest's Enescu Festival, the Colmar and Canary Islands festivals and Bogotá's Beethoven Festival; In 2011, on the occasion of the Liszt bicentenary year, they played at the Bozar Centre in Brussels and at the Vatican, at a concert held in honour of Pope Benedict XVI. The ensemble pays regular visits to France, Japan, Germany, Romania, Spain, Slovakia and Slovenia, among other countries. In recent years, they have performed in Bogotá, Istanbul, South Korea, China and Switzerland.

== Principal conductors ==
- Dezső Bor (1923–1939)
- Béla Csilléry (1939–1945)
- László Somogyi and Ferenc Fricsay (1945–1952)
- János Ferencsik (1952–1984)
- Ken-Ichiro Kobayashi (1987–1997)
- Zoltán Kocsis (1997–2016)
- Zsolt Hamar (2017–present)
- György Vashegyi (2022-)
