= Gilbert Varga =

- Born: 17 January 1952 (age 74); London, England
- Genre: Classical
- Occupation: Conductor
- Years active: 1976–present

Gilbert Varga (born 1952, London) is a British-Hungarian conductor. He studied violin from the age of four with his father, Tibor Varga, a famous Hungarian violinist and conductor. After an accident brought an abrupt halt to a promising solo career Gilbert studied conducting under Franco Ferrara, Sergiu Celibidache and Charles Bruck.

The earlier part of his conducting career concentrated on work with many chamber orchestras throughout Germany and France including extensive work with the Tibor Varga Chamber Orchestra. From 1980 to 1985 Gilbert Varga was Chief Conductor of the Hofer Symphoniker and between 1985 and 1990 Chief Conductor of the Philharmonia Hungarica in Marl, with whom he toured throughout Germany, Austria, Switzerland and Italy. In 1990, his final year as Music Director, he conducted their debut tour to Hungary with Yehudi Menuhin.

Since that time, he has been invited to conduct several European ensembles including the Munich Philharmonic, the radio orchestras of Cologne and Frankfurt and the Gurzenich Orchestra. From 1991 to 1995 he was Permanent Guest Conductor of the Stuttgart Chamber Orchestra; from 1997 until 2000 he was Principal Guest Conductor of the Malmö Symphony Orchestra; and from 2001 to 2008 he was Principal Conductor of the Euskadi Symphony Orchestra (Euskadiko Orkestra Sinfonikoa). From 2013 to 2018 he was the principal conductor of the Taipei Symphony Orchestra in Taipei, Taiwan.

== Recent years ==
In North America he also conducted Minnesota, Kansas City Symphony, Naples Philharmonic and St Louis Symphony Orchestras, the symphony orchestras of Toronto, Milwaukee and Indianapolis, Los Angeles and St Paul Chamber Orchestras. Varga appeared twice at Aspen Music Festival. In South America, Varga appeared at Teatro Colon in Buenos Aires in the summer of 1999, returning in May 2000 during a tour of South America with the Euskadi Symphony Orchestra. He has also made successful appearances with Yomiuri Nippon Symphony Orchestra and the Sydney Symphony. In Europe Varga has worked with most major symphony orchestras, including the Bavarian Radio Symphony Orchestra, Rotterdam Philharmonic, Orchestre de Paris, Budapest Festival Orchestra, Sofia Philharmonic, Bamberg Symphony and Hallé Orchestra. In 2001–2002 his engagements included Orchestre National de Belgique, RAI National Symphony Orchestra, Gothenburg Symphony (with whom he made a successful recording with trombonist Christian Lindberg) and performances at the Schleswig-Holstein Musik Festival.

Over recent seasons, Varga's reputation in North America has grown swiftly. In the 2011–2012 season he made his debut with the Houston Symphony and returned to the Philadelphia Orchestra (with Yefim Bronfman), and other orchestras, including the Indianapolis, Colorado, Utah and Nashville symphonies and the Minnesota Orchestra whom he conducts every season. Since May 2013 he is principal conductor of the Taipei Symphony Orchestra. Mr. Varga did not extend his contract with Taipei and leave his post in December 2018.

Varga works also at music competitions: From 2001 to 2012 he conducted the final rounds of the Queen Elisabeth Competition in Brussels, Belgium, which is one of the most challenging and prestigious competitions for instrumentalists. Furthermore, he is chairman of the jury of the International Violin Competition Henri Marteau in Lichtenberg and Hof, Germany.

== Discography ==
- Siebenthal – Orchestre Philharmonique Bulgare de Roussé, Gilbert Varga – Symphonie Valaisanne (LP). Concert Hall, Guilde Internationale du Disque, 1976
- Chopin: Piano Concerto No. 1 in E minor Op. 11; Piano Concerto No. 2 in F Minor Op. 21. Gilbert Varga, Sequeira Costa, Royal Philharmonic Orchestra. Intersound Records, 1999
- Håkan Hardenberger, Malmö Symphony Orchestra, Gilbert Varga – Håkan Hardenberger Plays Swedish Trumpet Concertos (CD, Album), 2000
- Peter I. Tschaikowsky Von St. Petersburg Nach Moskau (Various). Box, comp + 3 CD). Das Beste Reader's Digest, 2001
- Sounds of the Basque Country. Composers: Jesus Guridi, Jose Maria Usandizaga, Jesus Arambarri, Andres Isasi, Francisco Escudero, Maurice Ravel. Conductors: Miguel Angel Gomez Martinez, Enrique García Asensio, Gilbert Varga et al.. Basque National Orchestra, Maria Bayo (Performer). Claves, 2003.
- Tschaikowsky: Concerto for Violin & Orchestra in D major, Op. 35; Serenade for Strings in C major, Op. 48. Alfred Wallenstein (Conductor), Gilbert Varga (Conductor), London Symphony Orchestra, Stuttgarter Kammerorchester. Profil – G Haenssler, 2005
- Queen Elisabeth Competition of Belgium – Piano 2007 (Various). 3 CD, 2007
- Rubinstein: Symphony No. 6 – Gilbert Varga (Conductor), Philharmonia Hungarica
- Anna Vinnitskaya Plays Prokofiev, Ravel Piano Concertos – Gilbert Varga (Conductor). Naive, 2010.
- La Jeune Philharmonie / De Jonge Filharmonie – Wendy Hoffman – Gilbert Varga – Concert de la Société philharmonique / Concert Van De Filharmonische Vereniging(CD, Album). Belgium.
