= Zsolt Hamar =

Hungarian conductor

Zsolt Hamar (born 1968 in Budapest) is a Hungarian conductor.

== History ==
Hamar started to play the piano at the age of six and later studied composition at the Béla Bartók Conservatoire. He followed university studies at the Franz Liszt Academy of Music, Budapest, where he had courses in composition with Emil Petrovics and in conducting with Ervin Lukacs and Tamas Gal; he graduated in 1995. In the following years he won 2nd prize and public prize of the 8th International Competition in conducting of the Hungarian Television, the 2nd prize of the Conductors Competition in Cadaques in 1996, the 1st prize of the International Conductors Competition of the Portuguese Radio in 1997 and the 1st prize of the 6th International Antonio Pedrotti Conductors Competition in Trento. He had meanwhile conducted nearly all symphonic orchestras in Hungary. In 1997 he was invited by musical director Zoltán Kocsis to become first permanent conductor of the Hungarian National Philharmonic Orchestra. In 1998 Hamar assisted Lorin Maazel for Verdi's Don Carlos at the Salzburger Festspiele. From 2000 until 2009 September he was music director of Pannon Philharmonics – Pécs. He was permanent guest conductor of the Orchestra di Padova e del Veneto.

== Recent work ==
Zsolt Hamar is a regular guest at various concert halls in Europe, also in Japan and in the USA. He has worked with orchestras such as Deutsches Symphonie-Orchester Berlin, Philharmonisches Orchester Dortmund, Vlaams Radio Orkest, Lisboa Radio Orchestra, Orchestra Haydn di Bolzano e Trento, Aalborg Symphony Orchestra, Vestjysk Symfoniorkester, Slovenian Philharmonic, Warsaw Radio Symphony Orchestra, Cadaques Symphony Orchestra, Philharmonic Orchestra Tirgu Mures, Mikkelin Kaupungin Orkesteri, Orchestra di Padova e del Veneto, Orchestra del Teatro Lirico di Cagliari, Japan Philharmonic Orchestra, Wiener Kammerorchester, and Wiener Akademie. Since 2001, Zsolt Hamar has been the conductor of the Hungarian State Opera House.

Hamar is constantly guest at international opera houses, as recently at the Teatro National de Sao Carlo in Lisbon with La traviata and at the Teatro Treviso with Don Giovanni. He was a guest conductor at the Zürcher Oper, including three premieres. At the Oper Frankfurt, he conducted Eugène D'Albert's Tiefland and a new production of Verdi's I masnadieri. He had concerts with symphony orchestras all over the world, such as Calgary, Zagreb, Ljubljana (Slovenian Philharmonic), Switzerland (Lucerne Symphony Orchestra), Salzburg (Mozarteum Orchestra), Graz (Vienna Radio Symphony Orchestra), and the Bruckner Orchestra in the Brucknerhaus Linz. For the latter concert he was acclaimed as a "sensation as a conductor" and "conductor of top quality" in the Austrian press. He recorded works of Franz Liszt with the Hungarian National Philharmonic Orchestra, Mahler's Symphony No. 1 with the Pannon Philharmonic Orchestra.

Zsolt Hamar was awarded the Franz Liszt Award of the Hungarian Republic in 2003 by the Cultural Minister, and the Knight's Cross of the Order of the Hungarian Republic by the President of Hungary in 2006.

From 2012, Hamar has been the General Musical Director (GMD) of the Hessisches Staatstheater Wiesbaden, Germany.
