= Lü Shao-chia =

Taiwanese conductor

Lu Shao-chia
- 呂紹嘉
- Born: 1960 (age 65–66); Zhudong, Hsinchu County, Taiwan
- Occupation: Conductor

Lü Shao-chia (Chinese: 呂紹嘉; pinyin: Lǚ Shàojiā; born 1960) is a Taiwanese conductor. He was music director of the National Symphony Orchestra of Taiwan.

== Biography ==
Born in Hsinchu, Taiwan, Lü studied piano at an early age. Initiated by Taiwanese conductor Chen Chiu-sen, he later turned to conducting and went on to Indiana University School of Music and Vienna Hochschule für Musik. In 1988, he was accepted in conducting course held by maestro Gennady Rozhdestvensky in Accademia Musicale Chigiana and graduated as the only recipient of Diploma di Honore. In 1991 he graduated from the Vienna Hochschule für Musik with excellence and was honored by the Science Research Department of Austrian government for his achievements.

Lü was called in on short notice to replace the ailing Sergiu Celibidache for his scheduled concert tour with the Munich Philharmonic in Taiwan. As an opera conductor, Lü was appointed principal conductor of Komische Oper Berlin in 1995. By the time he left the opera house in 1998, he had conducted hundreds of performances of more than 30 operas, which also helped establish his reputation as one of the leading opera conductors of his generation. Starting 1996, Lü was invited to work with English National Opera, in London, Norway Royal Opera, GöteborgsOperan, in Gothenburg, Opera Australia, in Sydney, La Monnaie, in Brussels, Stuttgart Opera, Deutsche Oper Berlin, and Hamburgische Staatsoper.

Among other orchestras, he has conducted the Orchestre National de France, Orchestra dell'Accademia Nazionale di Santa Cecilia, Stuttgart Radio Symphony Orchestra, the Swedish Radio Symphony Orchestra and the Norwegian Radio Symphony Orchestra.

Lü headed Staatsorchester Rheinische Philharmonia between 1998 and 2004 as music director and was bestowed 'Peter Cornelius Plakette' by the Cultural Minister of Rheinland for his outstanding contribution in local culture in May 2004.

Lü has led the Niedersächsische Staatsoper Hannover as music director from 2001 to 2006. The performance of the opera house was elevated to higher level soon after his arrival and he along with the opera house were named 'Conductor of the Year' and 'Best Opera House of the Year'.

Lü won the International Kiril Kondrashin Competition for conductors in 1994 and went on to win International Besançon Competition for Young Conductors (both first prize and Lyre d'Or award) and Pedrotti International Competition for Orchestra Conductors.

Lü was Music Director of the National Symphony Orchestra of Taiwan from 2010 to 2020 and named Conductor Emeritus in 2021.

Since 2020, he is Distinguished Chair Professor at Taipei National University of Arts.
