= András Ligeti =

Hungarian violinist and conductor (1953–2021)

- Born: 5 August 1953; Pécs, Hungary
- Died: 19 September 2021 (aged 68)
- Education: Franz Liszt Academy of Music
- Occupation: Conductor
- Organizations: Hungarian State Opera House; Budapest Symphony Orchestra; Taipei Symphony Orchestra
- Awards: Kossuth Prize

András Ligeti (5 August 1953 – 19 September 2021) was a Hungarian classical violinist and conductor who worked internationally. He was chief conductor of the Hungarian State Opera House until 1985, and chief conductor to the Budapest Symphony Orchestra from 1989 to 1993. He recorded with a focus on Hungarian music and contemporary music.

== Biography ==
Ligeti was born in Pécs on 5 August 1953. He studied violin and conducting at the Franz Liszt Academy of Music in Budapest. In 1975, he won the First Prize at the Leó Weiner Violin Competition and in 1980 at the Bloomington Violin Competition. He graduated in 1979 as conductor and was awarded the Sir Georg Solti Scholarship, studying with Karl Österreicher in Vienna.

Ligeti was with the Hungarian State Opera House between 1977 and 1985, first as concertmaster, then as chief conductor, where he performed much of the central repertoire. In 1985 he became associate conductor to the Budapest Symphony Orchestra, succeeding György Lehel as Chief Conductor in 1989, a position he held until 1993, when he became Chief Guest. With the Budapest Symphony he gave tours to Great Britain, Japan and Korea, and the orchestra's first visit to Australia in 1994. In 1997 he became the music director of the Matáv Hungarian Symphony Orchestra. From 1988, he was board member of the Hungarian Musical Society.

Ligeti conducted worldwide, including the Dresden Philharmonic, Berlin Radio Symphony, BBC Symphony, Oslo Philharmonic, BBC Philharmonic (including a tour to France), Israel Philharmonic, Bergen Symphony, BBC Scottish Symphony, Seoul Philharmonic Orchestra, Nagoya Philharmonic Orchestra, Orchestre de Paris, Academia Santa Cecilia, and Orchestre de la Suisse Romande.

He enjoyed a close relationship with Claudio Abbado, beginning when he worked with Abbado and the Gustav Mahler Jugendorchester; at Abbado's invitation he conducted concerts and opera at the Wien Modern festival during the 1990s.

As a performing artist and conductor, he made the first performance or the Hungarian premiere of many contemporary compositions, including works by György Kurtág (Mi is a szó, 'What is the Word', 1991), Zoltán Jeney, László Vidovszky, Igor Stravinsky, Luciano Berio and Alfredo Casella.

He recorded many CDs, especially of Hungarian music, for companies such as BMG Conifer, Naxos Records, Hungaroton and Radioton, as well as numerous recordings for radio and television worldwide. With the Budapest Sinfonietta, a chamber ensemble of the Budapest Symphony, he conducted and recorded a considerable repertoire of 20th-century music.

In 1998 he made his UK operatic debut with a new production of Bizet's Carmen for Opera North, directed by Phyllida Lloyd. In 1999 he also gave acclaimed performances of The Damnation of Faust by Berlioz at the Perth Festival with the West Australian Symphony Orchestra. In 2001 he was appointed principal guest conductor of the West Australian Symphony Orchestra (WASO). As an associate professor, he directed the conducting work of Liszt Ferenc Academy of Music for years.

From 2005 to 2007, he served as the music director of the Taipei Symphony Orchestra.

Ligeti died on 19 September 2021, one month after his 68th birthday.

== Awards and recognition ==
Ligeti's awards included:

- 1988: Béla Bartók-Pásztory Ditta Prize
- 1988: Ferenc Liszt Prize
- 2001: Béla Bartók-Pásztory Ditta Prize
- 2002: Title of Meritorious Artist of Hungary
- 2003: Knight of the Star of Italian Solidarity
- 2007: Kossuth Prize
