= Taipei Symphony Orchestra =

Symphony orchestra based in Taipei, Taiwan

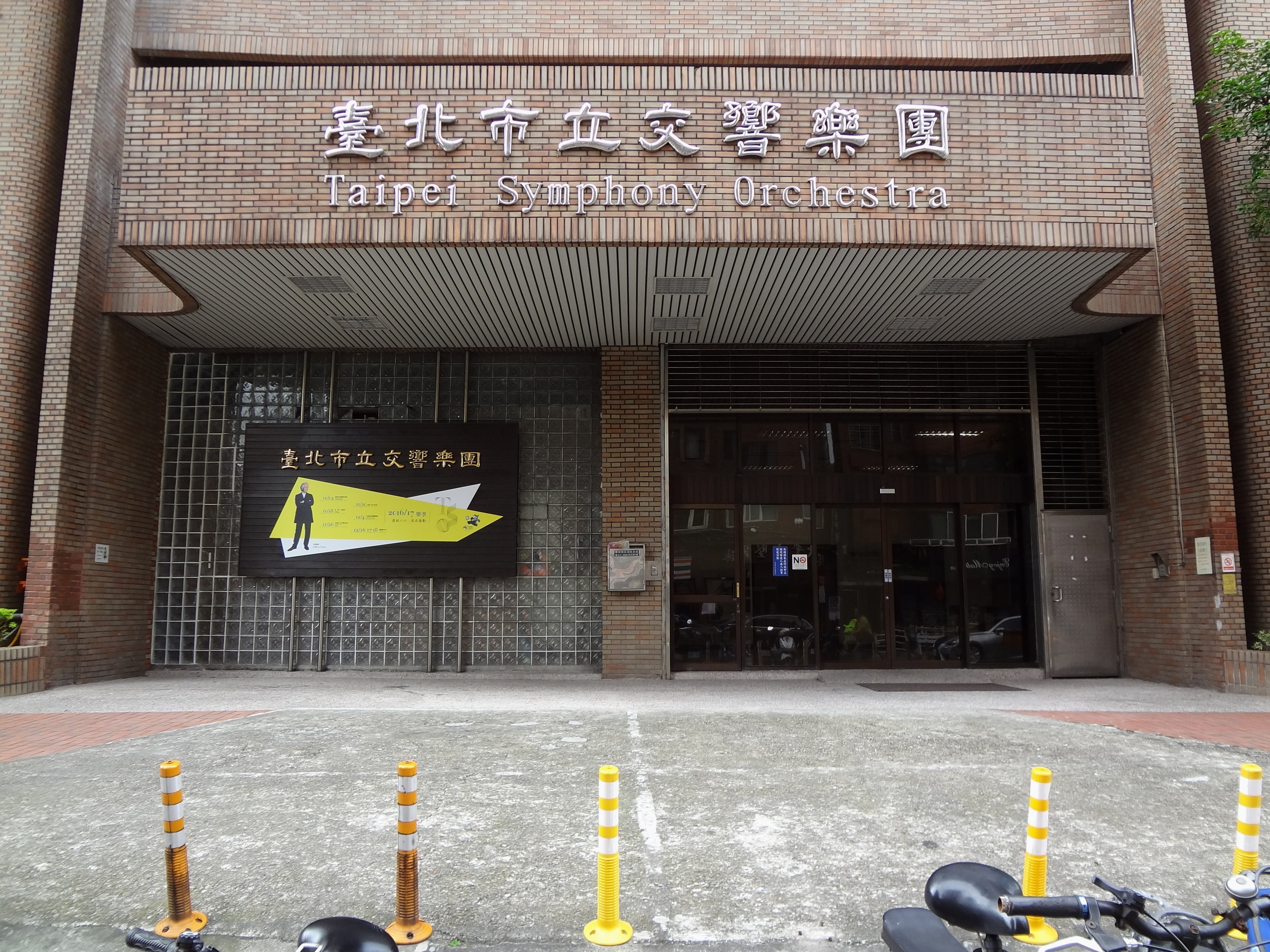
- Native name: 台北市立交響樂團
- Short name: TSO
- Founded: 1969
- Location: Taipei, Taiwan
- Principal conductor: Eliahu Inbal
- Website: english.tso.gov.taipei

The Taipei Symphony Orchestra (TSO, Chinese: 台北市立交響樂團; pinyin: Táiběi Shìlì Jiāoxiǎng Yuètuán), founded in 1969, is one of the leading orchestras based in Taipei, Taiwan. TSO works with European music directors and conductors, such as Reinhard Goebel, Martin Fischer-Dieskau, and Maurice Steger.

== Overview ==
Under the direction of Felix Chen from 1986 to 2003, the orchestra grew in size and strength, and the length of the season expanded. Chen also broadened the orchestra's repertoire by introducing new and unfamiliar works from all music styles and periods. For the 2004 season, the Taipei City Government nominated bassoonist Chia-Chu Hsu as the general director.

== Taipei Music Festival ==
In 1979, Taipei Music Festival, instructed by former Taipei City mayor Lee Teng-hui, was created to promote cultural activity within the island of Taiwan. Over the years, the festival has been recognized worldwide for its successful performances and international roster of artists, such as the Royal Philharmonic Orchestra, Israel Philharmonic Orchestra, Saint Petersburg Philharmonic Orchestra, Russian State Philharmonic Orchestra, Oslo Philharmonic, Bamberg Symphony, Budapest Symphony Orchestra, Royal Concertgebouw Orchestra, Orchestre philharmonique de Radio France, and Berlin Radio Symphony Orchestra.

The annual opera produced by TSO every year is also an important musical event on the island. The TSO has performed such works as La traviata, Faust, Carmen, Turandot, La bohème, Aida, Madama Butterfly, Cavalleria rusticana, Pagliacci, Otello, The Flying Dutchman, and Salome. Recently, the TSO has featured operas by Carl Orff, having performed his Die Kluge in 2016, with a performance of Der Mond in August 2017.

== Music directors and principal conductors ==
- Teng Chang-kuo (鄧昌國), 1969–1973
- Chen Tun-chu (陳暾初), 1973–1986
- Felix Chen, 1986–2003
- András Ligeti, 2005–2007
- Martin Fischer-Dieskau, 2008–2011
- Gilbert Varga, 2013–2018
- Eliahu Inbal, 2019– 2022
- Alexander Liebreich, 2026–present

== See also ==
- List of symphony orchestras in Taiwan
