= Nagoya Philharmonic Orchestra =

Symphony orchestra in Nagoya, Japan

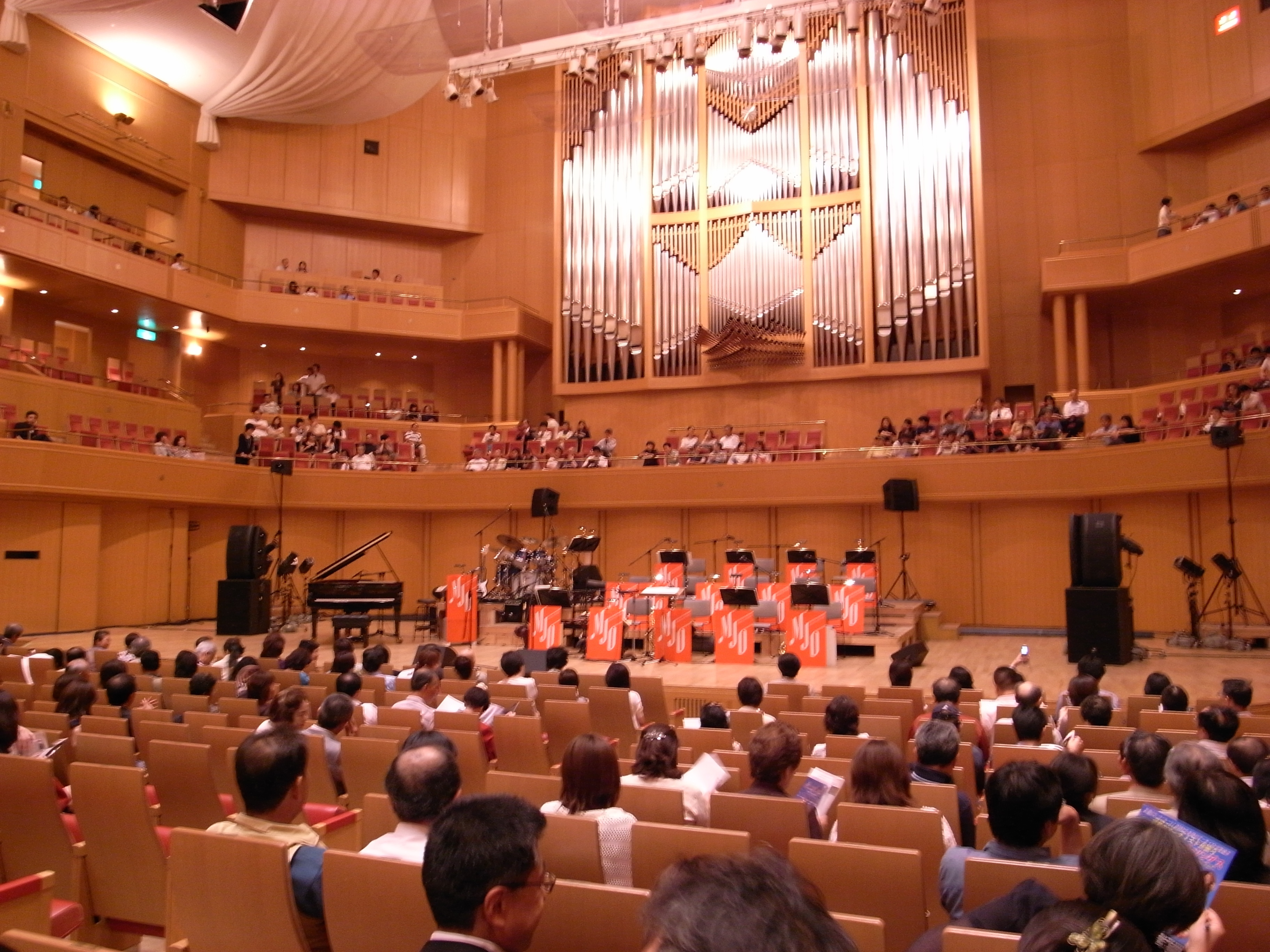
The Nagoya Philharmonic Orchestra gives concerts in the Aichi Prefectural Arts Theater

The Nagoya Philharmonic Orchestra (名古屋フィルハーモニー交響楽団, Nagoya Firuhāmonī Kōkyō Gakudan) is a Japanese symphony orchestra based in Nagoya, founded in 1966. The orchestra gives concerts primarily at the Aichi Prefectural Arts Theater Concert Hall and the Chukyo University Center for Culture & Arts Aurora Hall.

== History ==
The orchestra gave their first subscription concert in October 1967. In 1971, Hiroyuki Iwaki became the orchestra's first general music director, with the parallel appointment of Yoshikazu Fukumura as 'permanent conductor'. This dual arrangement of conductors continued until the tenure of Yuzo Toyama as both general music director and permanent conductor from 1981 to 1987, the only conductor in the history of the orchestra to hold both titles. During the tenure of Ken-Ichiro Kobayashi, the title of general music director was changed to music director, effective 2001. The title of permanent conductor was discontinued, and the post of chief conductor was instituted, starting with Ryusuke Numajiri in 2003.

Previous chief conductors have included Thierry Fischer, chief conductor from April 2008 through February 2011, and Martyn Brabbins (2013–2016). Fischeer subsequently took the title of honorary guest conductor of the orchestra. The orchestra's honorary conductor since 1993 is Moshe Atzmon, who was permanent conductor from 1987 to 1993. Kobayashi has held the title of conductor laureate since 2003.

Kentaro Kawase became music director of the orchestra in April 2023. In October 2026, the orchestra announced the appointment of Thomas Dausgaard as its next principal guest conductor, effective April 2027.

== Conductors in leadership positions ==
- Hiroyuki Iwaki (general music director, 1971–1974)
- Tadashi Mori (1974–1980)
- Yuzo Toyama (music director and permanent conductor, 1981–1987)
- Ken-Ichiro Kobayashi (general music director, 1998–2001; music director, 2001–2003)
- Thierry Fischer (chief conductor, 2008–2011; honorary conductor, 2011–present)
- Martyn Brabbins (chief conductor, 2013–2016)
- Kentaro Kawase (music director, 2023–present)

== Other affiliated conductors ==
- Kenichi Kiyota (1966–1973)
- Hiroyuki Iwaki (1971–1973)
- Yoshikazu Fukumura (1971–1974)
- Toshio Ukai (1972)
- Tadahi Mori (1974–1980)
- Shunji Aratani (1974–1980)
- Yuzo Toyama (1981–1987)
- Taizo Takemoto (1981–1983)
- Jyunichi Hirokami (1983–1984)
- Kouki Tezuka (1984–1989)
- Moshe Atzmon (1987–1993)
- Taijiro Iimori (1993–1998)
- Ryusuke Numajiri (2003–2006)
- Masahiko Enkoji (2011– )
- Kazuhiro Koizumi (2016– )
- Thomas Dausgaard (principal guest conductor-designate, effective April 2027)
