= János Ferencsik =

Hungarian conductor

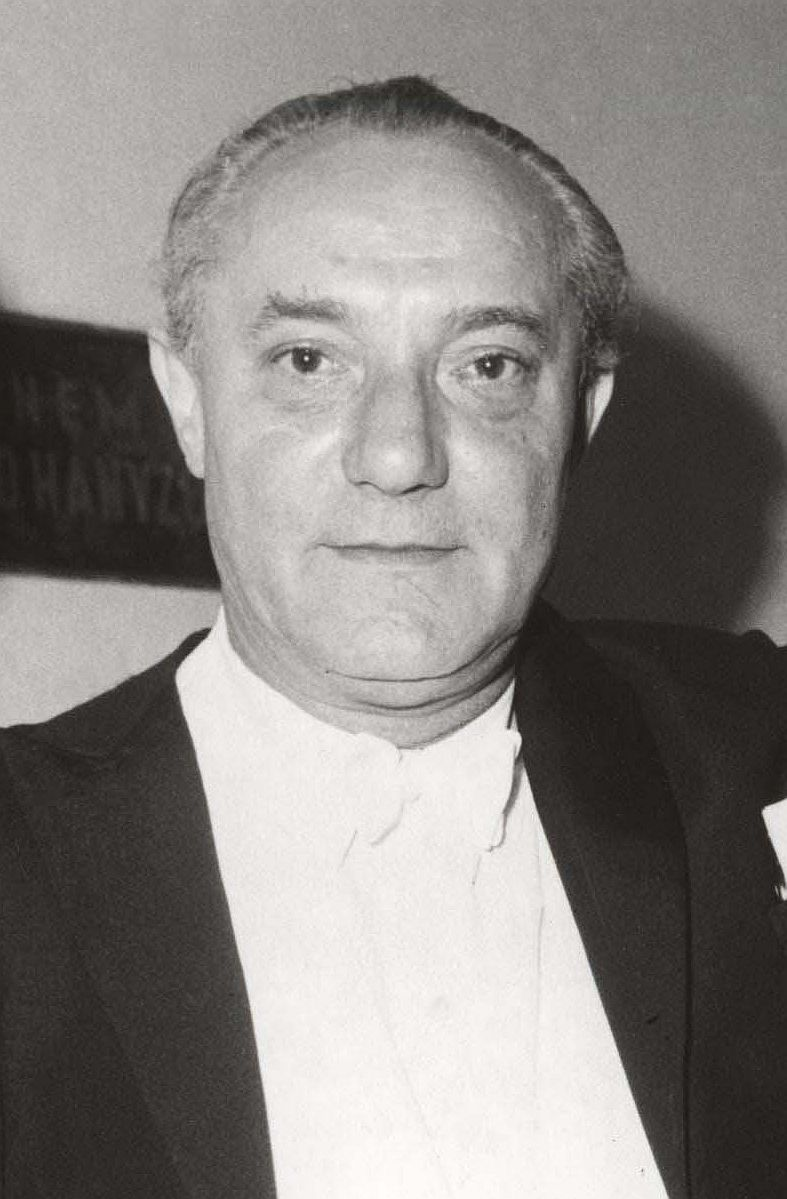
- Born: 18 January 1907; Budapest
- Died: 12 June 1984 (aged 77)
- Occupations: Musician, conductor

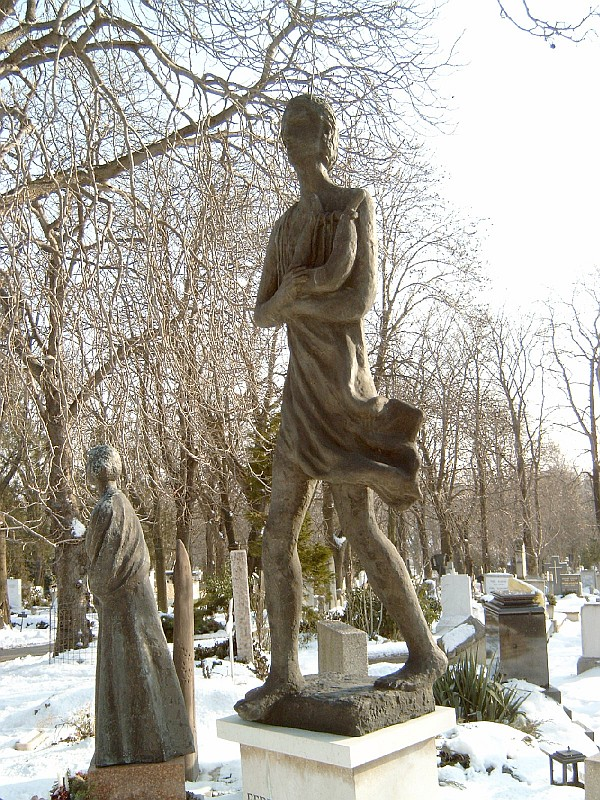
Grave of János Ferencsik

János Ferencsik (18 January 1907 – 12 June 1984) was a Hungarian conductor.

== Life and career ==
Ferencsik was born in Budapest; he actively played music even as a very young boy. He took violin lessons and taught himself to play the organ. He studied at the National Conservatory of Music in Budapest, where his major subjects were organ performance and composition. He joined the Budapest State Opera at the age of twenty, where he was engaged as a rehearsal coach. In this capacity he took part in the Bayreuth Festival in 1930–31.

At Bayreuth, he assisted Arturo Toscanini, an experience which was to be of decisive importance for the remainder of his career. Between the two world wars, he studied in Budapest under such conductors as Arturo Toscanini, Bruno Walter, Felix Weingartner and Wilhelm Furtwängler.

Ferencsik's international career began in 1937. By the end of the 1930s, he became one of the Hungarian Opera's leading conductors. He conducted the farewell concert of Béla Bartók and Ditta Pásztory-Bartók in 1940 in Budapest, just before Bartók had left the continent. His artistic career came to full fruition after 1945. From 1948 until 1950, Ferencsik was principal guest conductor of the Vienna State Opera, and he was guest conductor of the Los Angeles Philharmonic, and toured widely abroad, conducting on every continent with the exception of Africa.

He was conductor of the Hungarian National Philharmonic Orchestra from 1952 to 1984. He was music director from 1957 to 1973 of the Budapest Opera, and he returned there, from 1978 to 1984. From 1960 until 1967, he was the Conductor Chairman of the Budapest Philharmonic Orchestra.

Ferencsik was a friend of Hungarian composers László Lajtha, Béla Bartók and Zoltán Kodály and was known for his interpretations of their works. Among his many recordings are two of Kodály's Székelyfonó. Notable students include Alexander Raichev.

== Media ==
- Bartók: Divertimento, Hungarian State Orchestra, 1984.

== Sources ==
- Liner note with recording of Beethoven's Symphonies Nos 1 and 7, Hungarian Philharmonic Orchestra, on LaserLight 15 904.
- Szabolcsi Bence - Tóth Aladár: Zenei lexikon, Zeneműkiadó Vállalat, 1965. I. k. 616. o. "Ferencsik János"
- VÁRNAI PÉTER: Interview with János Ferencsik, ZENEMŰKIADÓ BUDAPEST 1972

Cultural offices
Preceded by László Somogyi	Principal Conductor, Hungarian National Philharmonic Orchestra; 1952–1984	Succeeded by Ken-Ichiro Kobayashi
Preceded by Ernst von Dohnányi	Chief Conductor, Budapest Philharmonic Orchestra; 1960–1967	Succeeded by András Kóródi
