= Chien Wen-pin =

Taiwanese classical conductor

- 簡文彬
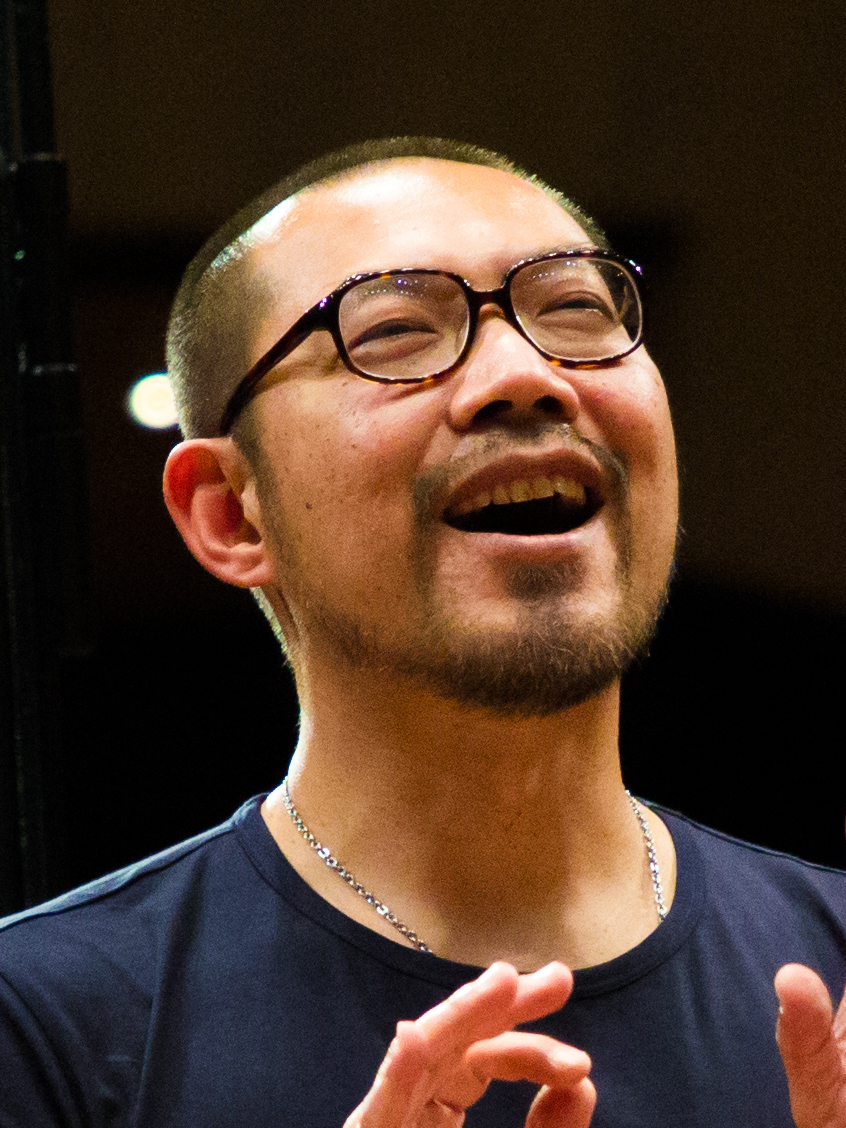
- Chien Wen-pin in 2019
- Pronunciation: Jiǎn Wénbīn
- Born: 1967 (age 58–59); Taipei, Taiwan
- Education: National Taiwan University of Arts; University for Music and Performing Arts (M.A.)
- Occupation: Conductor

Chien Wen-pin (Chinese: 簡文彬; pinyin: Jiǎn Wénbīn, born 1967 in Taipei) is a Taiwanese classical conductor. He was music director of National Symphony Orchestra in Taiwan 2001–2007.

Born in Taipei, Chien graduated from the National Taiwan University of Arts summa cum laude with a major in piano. In 1994, he took the highest honors of a master's degree in orchestra conducting at the University for Music and Performing Arts in Vienna. He won the first prize at the "Bottega" workshop for conductors at the Concorso Internazionale per Cantanti "Toti Dal Monte" competition in Treviso, Italy, 1992 and the second prize in Douai, France, 1994. Upon graduation he was soon invited to conduct the Vienna Chamber Opera and was awarded the only Special Mention in the first Leonard Bernstein Jerusalem International Conducting Competition in Israel, 1995. Since the 1996–1997 season, Chien has been engaged by the Deutsche Oper am Rhein, Düsseldorf/Duisburg. He has also been the Resident Conductor of the Pacific Music Festival in Sapporo, Japan, 1998–2004.

Through his extensive involvement with operatic performances, Chien has been invited by the Dutch National Opera, State Opera of Hamburg and Komische Oper Berlin, and was the guest conductor of the Moravian Philharmonic of Olomouc, Czech Republic, and Orchestre des concerts Lamoureux of France. In Japan, he has conducted the Yomiuri Nippon Symphony Orchestra and the NHK Symphony Orchestra. In June 1998, he led the Deutsche Oper am Rhein performing at the Wiener Festwochen, and this marked the first time that a Taiwanese conductor has appeared in the world-renowned festival.

As NSO's Music Director, Chien has placed major emphasis on creating new possibilities for orchestra's programming and playing. Several projects as Discovering Series, NSO Opera Series etc. have elicited high praises by a wide range of audiences; further performances of Tristan und Isolde, Berlioz' La Damnation de Faust, Der Ring des Nibelungen, War Requiem, John Corigliano's Pied Piper Fantasy, and Turangalila Symphonie, these master pieces have never appeared on the stages of Taiwan.

== Selected discography ==
- Shih. Chamber works Capriccio (record label) 2010
