= National Symphony Orchestra (Taiwan) =

National Symphony Orchestra (Taiwan Philharmonic)
- Orchestra
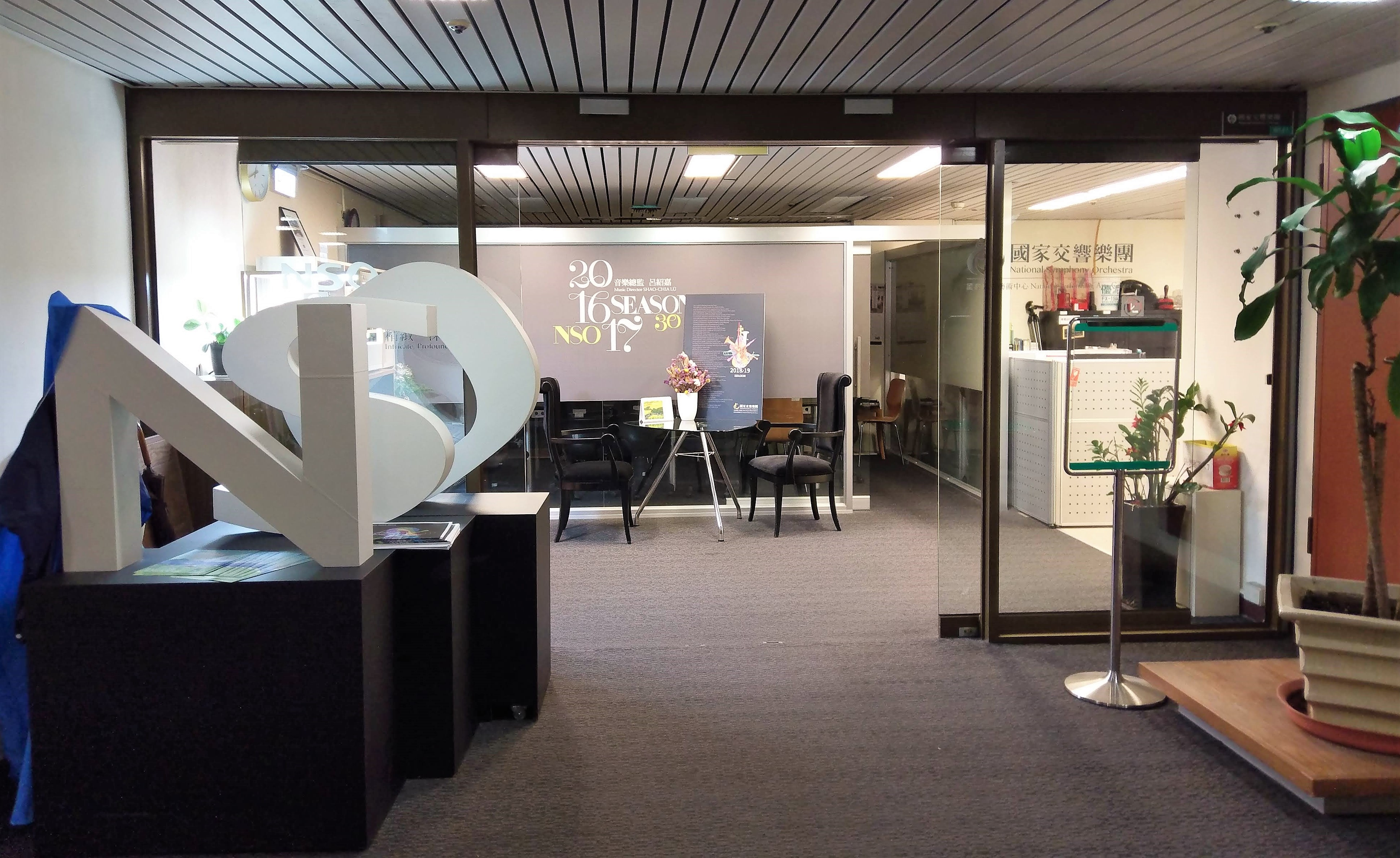
- Founded: 1986
- Location: Zhongzheng, Taipei, Taiwan
- Concert hall: National Concert Hall
- Music director: Jun Märkl
- Website: Official website

The National Symphony Orchestra (NSO; Chinese: 國家交響樂團; pinyin: Guójiā Jiāoxiǎng Yuètuán), also known as Taiwan Philharmonic (Chinese: 台灣愛樂) outside Taiwan, is one of the leading orchestras in Asia. Since 1987, the orchestra has its residence in the National Theater and Concert Hall (Taiwan) in Taipei, Taiwan.

== History ==
=== United Experimental Orchestra, 1986-1994 ===
In the year 1986, the orchestras of National Taiwan Normal University, Taipei National University of the Arts (then known as National Institute of the Arts, and National Taiwan University of Arts (then known as National Taiwan Academy of Arts) were combined to form the United Experimental Orchestra. Their first conductor was Gérard Akoka.

=== National Concert Hall Symphony Orchestra, 1994-2002 ===
The United Experimental Orchestra was reformed into the National Concert Hall Symphony Orchestra in 1994, affiliated with the National Theater and Concert Hall. Hsu Tsang-Houei was appointed as their first music director. Their first overseas tour in 1997 include concerts in Vienna, Paris, and Berlin.

=== National Symphony Orchestra, 2002- ===
Since 2002, the orchestra is rebranded as National Symphony Orchestra, also known as Taiwan Philharmonic overseas. It has since been affiliated with the National Performing Arts Center.

== Activities ==
=== Subscription Concert Series ===
In the year of 2002, NSO held a series of five concerts that featured all nine symphonies and five piano concertos by Ludwig van Beethoven. The concerts, called a discovery cycle (Chinese: NSO發現系列), became NSO's regular Subscription Concert Series later since the 2004/2005 season. In each season, there are ten concerts consisting of at least one orchestral work of a composer.

From September 2004 to June 2008, four Subscription Concert Series have been presented.

2007/2008
Tchaikovsky
2006/2007
Richard Strauss
2005/2006
Shostakovich
2004/2005
Mahler
2002/2003
Beethoven

In the 2008/2009 season, a newly created MyNSO series (Chinese: NSO青春套票) took place of the Subscription Concert Series.

=== Opera Series ===
Already in November 1994, NSO performed opera in National Concert Hall, Der fliegende Holländer was led by Prof. TSENG Dao-hsiung (Chinese: 曾道雄), in December 2000, Jahja Ling performed Hänsel und Gretel. Under Chien Wen-pin's directorship, he first tried a semi-stage performance of the Third Act of Die Walküre in May 2002, this experience became NSO's regular NSO Opera Series (Chinese: NSO歌劇系列) from the 2002/2003 season. In each season, there are two opera directed by cross-over artist in Taiwan, the cast consisted mainly local singers.

From December 2002 to December 2007, fourteen operas have been produced, many of them were Taiwan's premier*.

2007/2008
Die Fledermaus
2006/2007
*Der Ring des Nibelungen (complete), Die lustige Witwe
2005/2006
Così fan tutte, Le nozze di Figaro
2004/2005
*Norma, *Falstaff
2003/2004
*La damnation de Faust, Don Giovanni
2002/2003
Tosca, *Tristan und Isolde

=== Fairy Tale Forever Series ===
From April 2002 to April 2008, NSO has been collaborated with four different performing groups and organizations for bringing musical experiences (Chinese: NSO永遠的童話系列) to the young audiences.

2007/2008
Peer Gynt
2006/2007
Le Carnaval des Animaux
2005/2006
Firebird
2004/2005
Secret in the Woods
2003/2004
Pied Piper Fantasy
2002/2003
Peter and the Wolf

== Artistic Direction ==
- Gerard Akoka, artistic advisor and principal conductor 1986-1990
- Urs Schneider, artistic advisor and principal conductor 1991-1992
- Hsu Chang-huei (Chinese: 許常惠), music director (commissioner) 1994
- Chang Da-sheng (Chinese: 張大勝), music director 1995-1997
- Jahja Ling (Chinese: 林望傑), music director 1998-2001
- Chien Wen-pin (Chinese: 簡文彬), music director 2001-2007
- Günther Herbig, artistic advisor and principal guest conductor 2008-2010
- Lu Shao-chia (Chinese: 呂紹嘉), music director 2010-2021
- Jun Märkl, artistic advisor 2021, Music Director 2022-

== Musicians ==
Concertmasters
Wu Ting-yu (Chinese: 吳庭毓), Li I-ching (Chinese: 李宜錦)
Associate concertmaster
Teng Hao-tun (Chinese: 鄧皓敦)
Assistant Conductor
Chang Yin-fang (Chinese: 張尹芳)

- Strings (14-14-11-9-8)
- Woodwinds (4-4-4-4)
- Brass (6-4-3-0)
- Timpani & Percussion (5)
- Harp (1)

== Recordings ==
NSO has published the following recordings under their own label of "NSO Live":

- Chien Wen-pin & NSO Live: Mahler Symphony No. 4 & Shostakovich Symphony No. 8 (2008)
- Lü Shao-chia & NSO Live: Shostakovich Symphony No. 4 & Ein Heldenleben (2009)
- Günther Herbig & NSO Live: Mahler Symphony No. 6 (2009)
- Bruckner Symphony No. 9 Live with Günther Herbig (2010)
- Mahler Symphony No. 9 Live with Günther Herbig (2010)

Projects with conductor Lim Kek-tjiang and Rudolf Barshai are also scheduled.

== Staff ==
- Chairman of the Board of Directors, National Performing Arts Center: Henry Kao
- Executive Director: Lydia Wen-Chen Kuo
- Manager, Administration: Gail Chang
- Secretary of Music Director: Ling-Lin Shih
- Manager, Planning & Production: Barbie Chao-Yi Chen
- Manager, Public Relations: Ting-Yu Liu
- Manager, Marketing: Eileen Lin

== See also ==
- List of symphony orchestras in Taiwan
- National Theater and Concert Hall (Taiwan)
