= Zoltán Kocsis =

Hungarian pianist and conductor

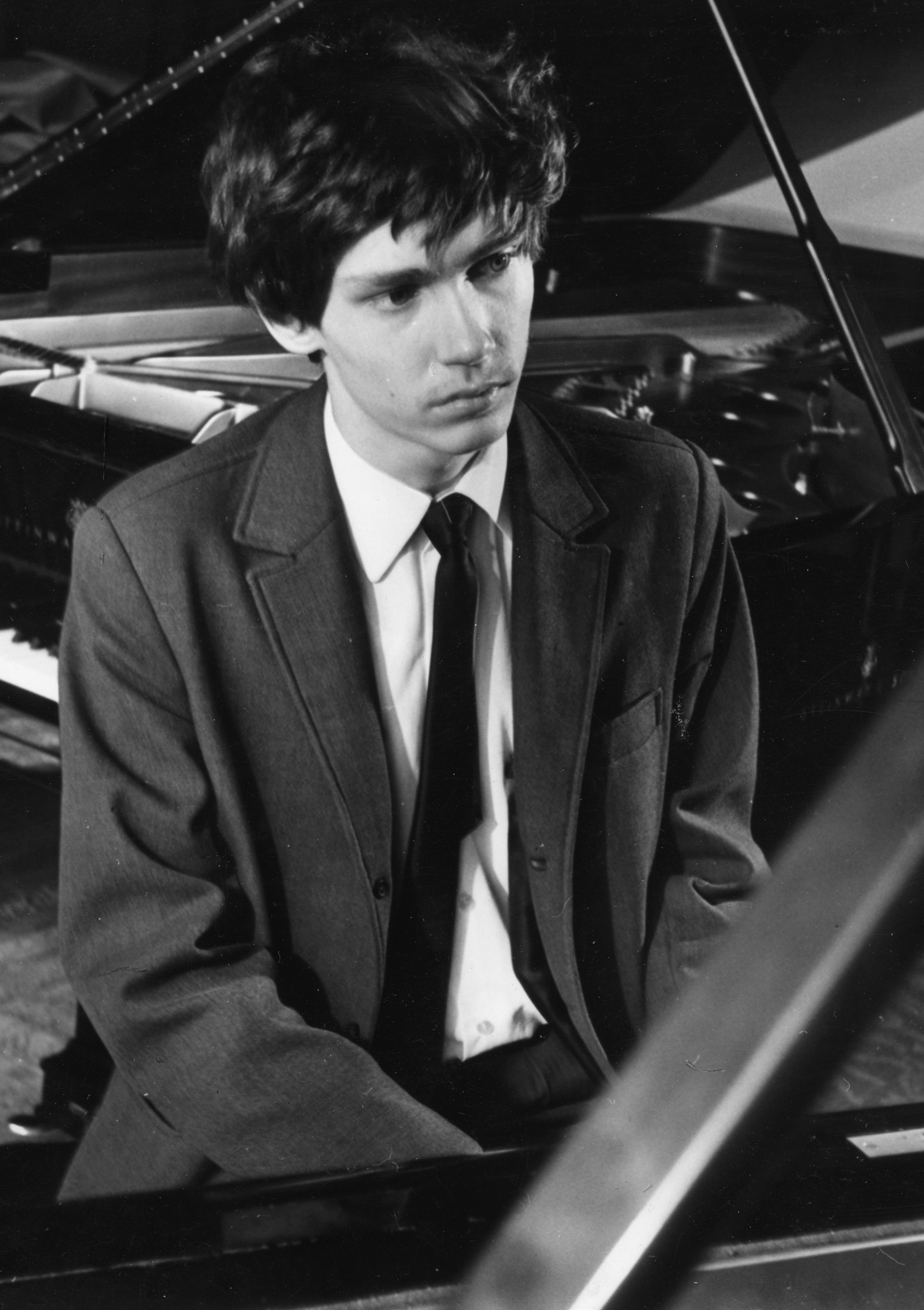
Zoltán Kocsis in 1972

Zoltán Kocsis (Hungarian: [ˈzoltaːn ˈkot͡ʃiʃ]; 30 May 1952 – 6 November 2016) was a Hungarian pianist, conductor and composer.

== Biography ==
=== Studies ===
Born in Budapest, he began his musical studies at the age of five and continued them at the Béla Bartók Conservatory in 1963, studying piano and composition. In 1968 he was admitted to the Franz Liszt Academy of Music, where he was a pupil of Pál Kadosa, Ferenc Rados and György Kurtág, graduating in 1973.

=== Career ===
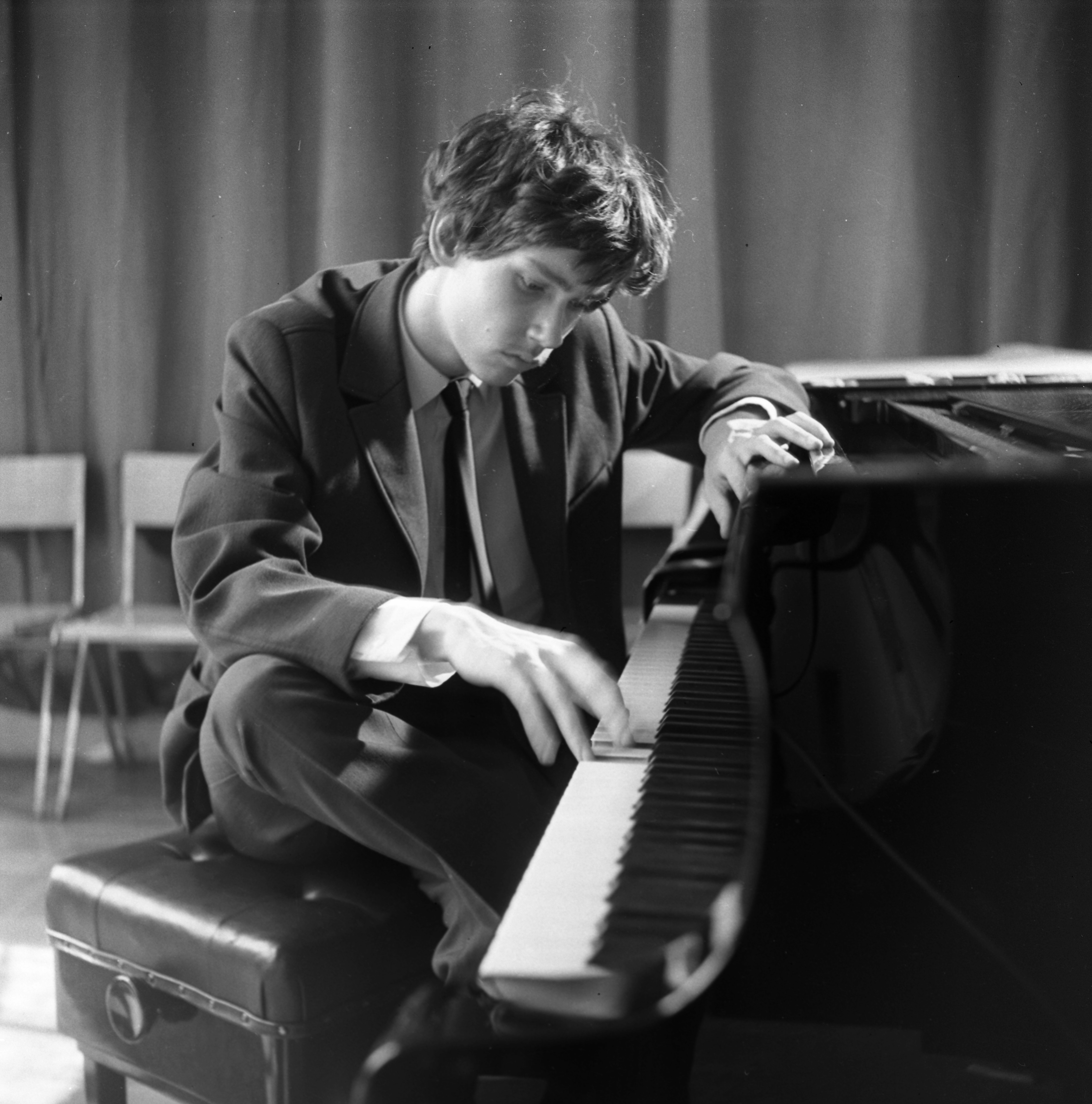
Kocsis in 1971

He won the Hungarian Radio Beethoven Competition in 1970, and made his first concert tour of the United States in the following year. He received the Liszt Prize in 1973, and the Kossuth Prize in 1978.

Kocsis performed with the Berlin Philharmonic, Chicago Symphony Orchestra, the San Francisco Symphony Orchestra, the New York Philharmonic, the Staatskapelle Dresden, the Philharmonia of London, and the Vienna Philharmonic. Kocsis recorded the complete solo piano works and works with piano and orchestra of Béla Bartók. In 1990 his recording of Debussy's two books of Images and other piano works by the composer won The Gramophone Instrumental Award for that year. He won another with the violinist Barnabás Kelemen in 2013 in the chamber category for the recording of Bartók's Violin Sonatas Nos 1 & 2.

American critic Harold C. Schonberg praised Kocsis' extraordinary technique and fine piano tone. According to Grove Music Online, he had "an impressive technique, and his forthright, strongly rhythmic playing is nevertheless deeply felt and never mechanical. Kocsis has a natural affinity for Bach, but is also a fine exponent of contemporary music and has given the first performances of works by Kurtág."

=== Conductor ===
Kocsis co-founded with Iván Fischer the Budapest Festival Orchestra in 1983, thus opening a new epoch in the history of Hungarian orchestral playing. Kocsis played a key role in the direction and the development of the program policy of the orchestra from its founding, and from 1987 also appeared as a conductor at their concerts.

He became the musical director of the Hungarian National Philharmonic in 1997 and held the title until his death in 2016.

=== Compositions ===
In addition to his compositions, Kocsis made piano transcriptions of works by Wagner, Rachmaninov, Bartók and Debussy. Kocsis completed the last act of Schoenberg's opera Moses und Aron, with the permission of Schoenberg's heirs, in 2010.

=== Personal life ===
He was married to pianist Adrienne Hauser from 1986. They had two children, Mark and Rita. In 1997 he married pianist Erika Tóth. They had a son, Krisztian, also a pianist, and a daughter, Viktoria. Kocsis died following a long illness after undergoing heart surgery on 6 November 2016, aged 64, in his native Budapest.

== Selected works ==
=== Opera ===
- Kopogtatások (1984–85)
- A vacsora (1984–85)
- Kiállítás (1984–85)

=== Orchestral and chamber music ===
- Premiere, for string orchestra (1976)
- Fészek (1975–76)
- The last but one encounter (Utolsó előtti találkozás), for piano and harpsichord (1981)
- 33. December, for chamber ensemble (1983)
- Memento, for string orchestra (Chernobyl) (1986)
- The last encounter (Utolsó találkozás) (1990)

Cultural offices
Preceded by Ken-Ichiro Kobayashi	Principal Conductors, Hungarian National Philharmonic Orchestra; 1997–2016	Succeeded by Zsolt Hamar
