= László Somogyi =

Hungarian conductor

Photo of László Somogyi with dedication, 1959

László Somogyi (25 June 1907 in Budapest, Austria-Hungary – 20 May 1988 in Geneva, Switzerland) was a Hungarian conductor.

== Biography ==
Somogyi received his musical training under Zoltán Kodály and Leo Weiner at the Ferenc Liszt Academy at Budapest, where he was later to become leading professor of the Conductor's Class. While in Hungary he founded and led the Symphonia Orchestra, was chief conductor of the Hungarian Broadcasting, and guested with the Hungarian State Opera. He conducted in Poland, East Germany, Romania, Yugoslavia and Bulgaria, as well.

In 1956 he left Hungary and was active all over the world, including South America. His American debut in March 1961 with the Houston Symphony was a great success. From 1964 to 1968 he served as chief conductor of the Rochester Philharmonic Orchestra. His recordings include Haydn symphonies (including the famous and disputed Toy Symphony), the Dvořák piano concerto with Rudolf Firkušný on the Westminster label, and Beethoven's Choral Fantasy Op. 80 and the Piano Concerto Op. 37 with a very young Daniel Barenboim recorded in the Mozart Hall, Vienna, May 1964. (Westminster WST 17078, Wesminster XWN 19078), MCA.
