= Ferenc Fricsay =

Hungarian conductor

- Ferenc Fricsay (photo with 1959 dedication)
- Born: 9 August 1914; Budapest, Austria-Hungary
- Died: 20 February 1963 (aged 48); Basel, Switzerland
- Occupation: Conductor
- Spouse: Marta Telbisz
- Children: 4
- Website: http://www.ferenc-fricsay.net/faminde.html

Ferenc Fricsay (Hungarian pronunciation: [ˈfrit͡ʃɒi ˈfɛrɛnt͡s]; 9 August 1914 – 20 February 1963) was a Hungarian conductor. From 1960 until his death, he was an Austrian citizen.

== Biography ==
Fricsay was born on 9 August 1914 to Hungarian military bandmaster Richard Fricsay and Berta Lengyel in Budapest, Austria-Hungary. Friscay studied music under Béla Bartók, Zoltán Kodály, Ernst von Dohnányi, and Leó Weiner. With these and other faculty at the Budapest Academy of Music he studied piano, violin, clarinet, trombone, percussion, composition and conducting. Fricsay made his first appearance as a conductor at age 15, substituting for his father at the podium of the Young Musicians Orchestra of Budapest. In 1930, at the age of 16, he succeeded his father as conductor of the Young Musicians Orchestra.

On graduating in 1933, Fricsay became répétiteur for the chorus of the Budapest Opera; then, from 1933 to 1943, he was music director of the Szeged Philharmonic Orchestra in the third largest city in Hungary; he also served as director of its military band from 1933. In 1942, he was court-martialed by the government of Miklós Horthy for wanting to employ Jewish musicians, and for having "Jewish blood" himself (according to reliable reports, his mother was Jewish). When the Nazis occupied Hungary in 1944, the chief editor of the Szeged daily newspaper warned Fricsay that the Gestapo planned to arrest him; he and his wife, Marta (née Telbisz) and three children Marta, Ferenc and Andras, avoided this fate by going underground in Budapest.

In 1945, secret emissaries offered him the co-directorship of the Metropolitan Orchestra of Budapest (later Budapest Philharmonic Orchestra); he also became principal conductor of the Budapest Opera. He conducted opera at the Vienna Volksoper and at the Salzburg Festival in the late 1940s, including world premieres in Salzburg of operas by Gottfried von Einem ("Dantons Tod" in 1947) and by Frank Martin ("Zaubertrank" in 1948). The enthusiastic reception of Fricsay's work on this international stage led to his being appointed chief conductor of the Berlin RIAS Symphony Orchestra and general music director of the Deutsche Oper Berlin, from 1949 to 1952, performing then in the Theater des Westens. He made his United Kingdom debut at the 1950 Edinburgh International Festival, conducting Mozart's Le Nozze di Figaro at the Glyndebourne Festival. He made his Buenos Aires debut that year with Carmina Burana. In 1951 he made his debuts in Italy and with the Royal Concertgebouw Orchestra in Amsterdam. In 1953 he made his debuts in Paris, Milan, Lucerne, and the US, where he conducted the Boston Symphony Orchestra and San Francisco Symphony. He was appointed musical director of the Houston Symphony in 1954, but resigned halfway through the season over "disagreements on musical policy." He made his debut with the Israel Philharmonic in 1954. He spent much of his time from the 1950s onward in Germany as music director of the Bavarian State Opera (1956–1958) and as conductor of the RIAS Symphony Orchestra, the Deutsche Oper Berlin and the Berlin Philharmonic. Also in 1956, he was appointed general music director of the Bavarian State Opera, a position he held until 1958.

Fricsay gave his last concert on 7 December 1961 in London, conducting the London Philharmonic Orchestra in the UK premiere of Zoltán Kodály's Symphony, Felix Mendelssohn's Violin Concerto (with Wolfgang Schneiderhan), and Beethoven's Symphony No. 7.

He suffered from repeated illnesses throughout his life and finally succumbed to cancer of the stomach on 20 February 1963 at the age of 48 in Basel, Switzerland.

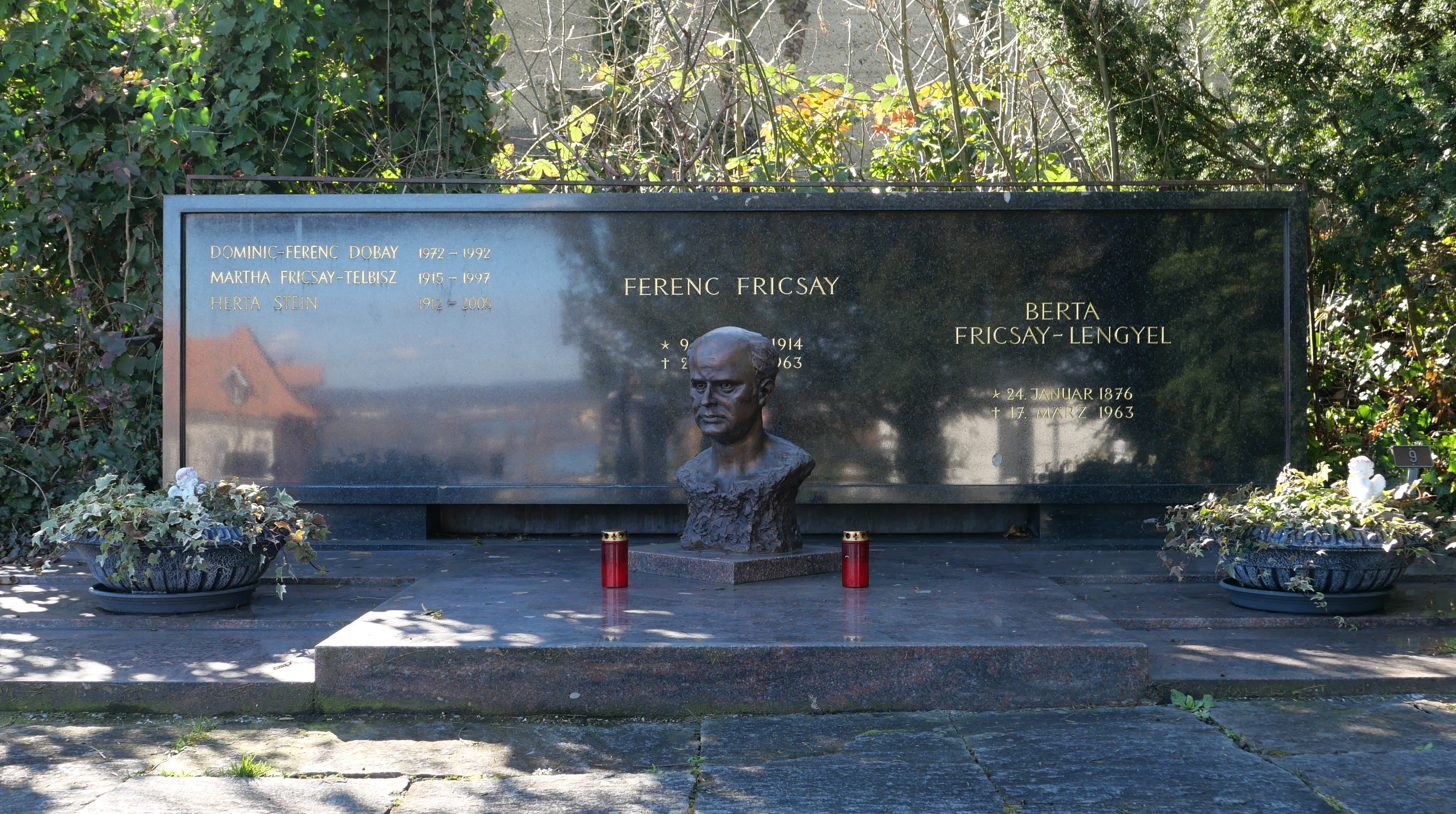
The grave in 2024 with a bust of Fricsay and Lake Constance reflected in the tombstone.

Fricsay found his final resting place at the cemetery of Ermatingen in the Swiss canton of Thurgau, where the family settled in 1952. His mother Berta, née Lengyel (1876-1963), died less than a month after Fricsay and was buried in the same grave. His grandson Dominic-Ferenc Dobay (1972–1992), his first wife Martha Fricsay-Telbisz (1915–1997) and Herta Stein (1912–2005) were buried in the same site as well. In 2015, the grave was declared by the municipality as a memorial which is protected from dissolution.

== Repertoire and recordings ==
Fricsay was known for his interpretations of the music of Mozart and Beethoven, as well as that of his teachers Béla Bartók and Zoltán Kodály. According to the entry in "New Grove", he conducted without a baton, but "confounded the adverse critics of this technique by the extreme clarity and precision of his performances," to which "New Grove" ascribes "a dynamic spirit" and "vividness of character in familiar classics."

From the 1950s until his death, he recorded for Deutsche Grammophon. He led the inauguration of the rebuilt Deutsche Oper Berlin with a performance of Don Giovanni on 24 September 1961. His 1958 recording of Beethoven's Ninth Symphony with the Berlin Philharmonic was used in the 1971 film A Clockwork Orange.

== Legacy ==
The International Ferenc Fricsay Conducting Competition was established in Szeged, Hungary, in memory of Fricsay and is held with the participation of the Hungarian National Symphony Orchestra Szeged.

The first edition of the competition took place from 3 to 10 September 2023. The jury was chaired by Vasily Petrenko and included Hermann Bäumer, Sándor Gyüdi, Constantine Orbelian, Thomas Sanderling and Ewa Strusińska. The laureates listed for the first edition were Sebastiaan van Yperen, Noris Borgogelli, Gabriel Hollander and Jorge Vázquez.

The second edition was held in Szeged from 31 August to 7 September 2025. The jury was chaired by Nayden Todorov and included Heiko Mathias Förster, Sándor Gyüdi, Lucius Hemmer, Alevtina Ioffe, Kirill Karabits, Constantine Orbelian and Adam Stadnicki. Its laureates were Misha Shekhtman, Hyunsik Shin, Nicolò Azzena and Vivian (Wing Wun) Ip.

== Notes ==
Cultural offices
Preceded by unknown	Music Director, Budapest Opera; 1945–1948	Succeeded by unknown
Preceded by Ernő Dohnányi	co-Music Director, Budapest Philharmonic Orchestra; 1945–1948	Succeeded by unknown
Preceded by none	Chief Conductor, Radio-Symphonie-Orchester Berlin; 1948–1954; 1959–1963	Succeeded by Lorin Maazel
Preceded by Efrem Kurtz	Music Director, Houston Symphony Orchestra; 1954–1954	Succeeded by Leopold Stokowski
Preceded by Rudolf Kempe	General Music Director, Munich Court Opera; 1956–1958	Succeeded by Joseph Keilberth
