= Budapest Festival Orchestra =

Hungarian symphonic orchestra

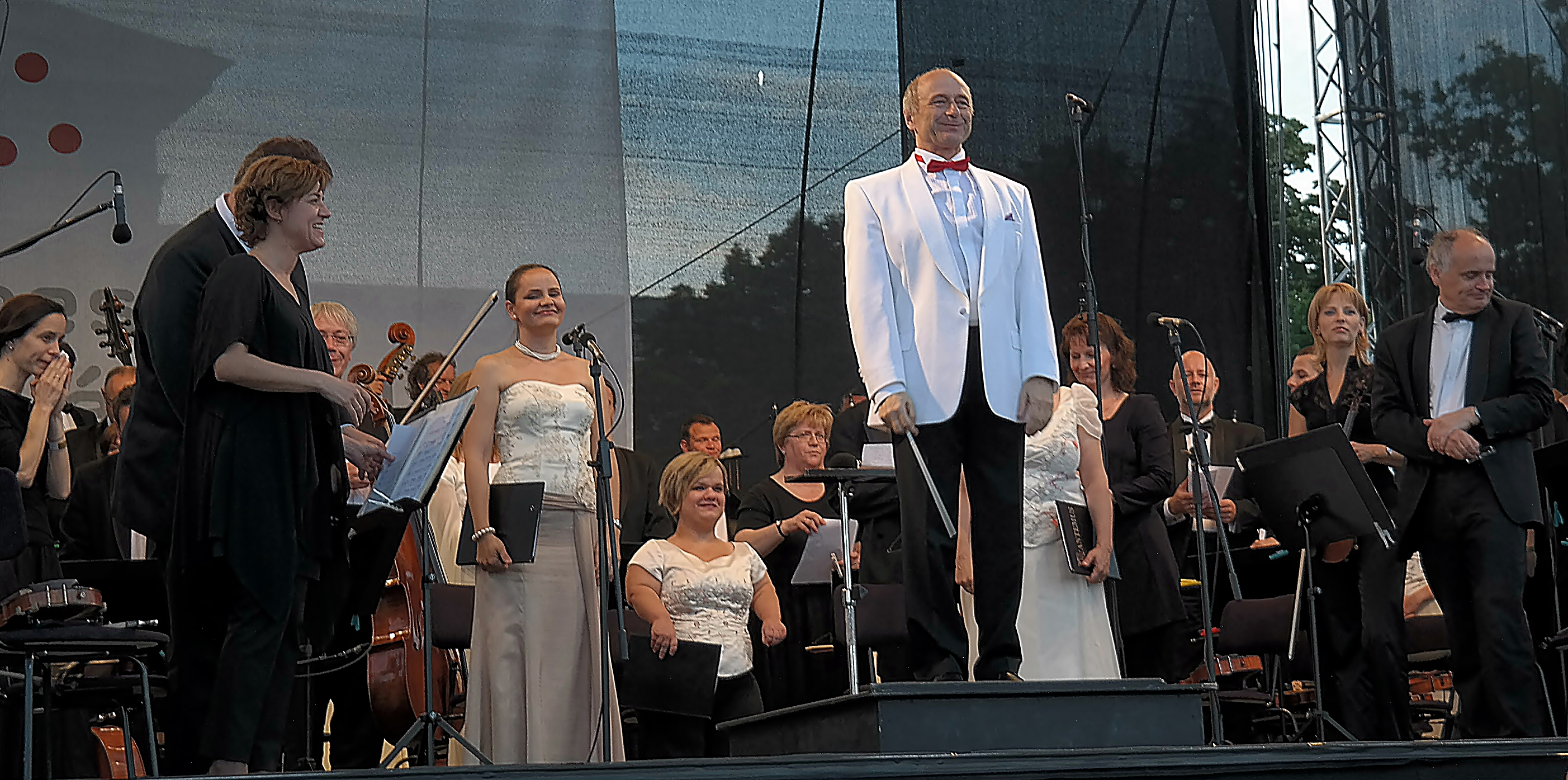
Budapest Festival Orchestra Space Dance Concert, in the middle Iván Fischer

The Budapest Festival Orchestra (Hungarian: Budapesti Fesztiválzenekar) was formed in 1983 by Iván Fischer and Zoltán Kocsis, with musicians "drawn from the cream of Hungary's younger players", as described by The Times. Its aim was to make its concerts into significant events in Hungary's musical life, and to give Budapest a new symphony orchestra of international standing.

== History ==
After the initial years of limited appearances, the orchestra became a permanent ensemble in 1992 playing in its home city and touring widely, extending its work to a full season,{Guardian} the ensemble operated under the aegis of the Budapest Municipality and the new BFO Foundation. After 2000, the orchestra was operated by the BFZ (Budapesti Fesztiválzenekar) Foundation. The finance came from a combination of from government support, city council subsidy and its own fund-raising. In 2006 the Budapest City Council subvention amounted to HUF 440 million, which translated to 48 concerts in Budapest each year with at least five in other Hungarian cities plus, at least 30 concerts outside the country to help promote Hungarian culture.

The Festival Orchestra is part of Budapest's music life and a frequent guest at musical festivals in Europe and America such as Salzburg (Summer Festival), Vienna (Musikverein, Konzerthaus), Lucerne (Festival), Zürich (Tonhalle), New York (Carnegie Hall, Avery Fisher Hall), Chicago, Los Angeles (Hollywood Bowl), Montreal, Tokyo (Suntory Hall), Hong Kong, Paris (Théâtre des Champs-Elysées), Berlin, Munich, Frankfurt (Alte Oper), London (BBC Proms Festival -15 performances in 11 seasons since 1992, Florence (Maggio Musicale), Rome (Accademia di Santa Cecilia), Amsterdam (Concertgebouw), Prague (Prague Spring International Music Festival), and Buenos Aires (Teatro Colón).

After having recorded on Hungaroton, Teldec, Decca Records, Berlin Classics, the orchestra signed an exclusive recording contract with Philips Classics in 1996. Its recording of Bartók's The Miraculous Mandarin received the 1998 Gramophone Award for best orchestral recording, while other recordings of works by Bartok, Dvořák, Tchaikovsky, and Mahler symphonies, have received awards or accolades, such as Diapason d'Or. In 2003 the BFO signed a cooperation agreement with Channel Classics Records.

The orchestra's opera projects have included The Magic Flute (Budapest), Così fan tutte (Athens), Idomeneo (Budapest/Athens), Orfeo ed Euridice (Budapest/Brussels), Il turco in Italia (Paris), and to inaugurate a Vicenza Opera Festival, Falstaff at the city's Teatro Olimpico. There have been cycles of works marking the 50th anniversary of Bartók's death (Budapest/Brussels/Cologne/Paris/New York - concert performances of the stage works and piano concertos), the cycle of Mahler symphonies over several years (Budapest/Lisbon/Frankfurt/Vienna), the series of performances for the centenary of Brahms' death, a Bartók-Stravinsky cycle (Edinburgh/London/San Francisco/New York) and a Liszt-Wagner cycle in January 2004 (Budapest/Bruselles/London).

The orchestra has Baroque group playing on period instruments, a group specialising in Hungarian folk music, jazz groups, a chamber orchestra series and midnight gigs for students, alongside its major orchestral concerts. There are also Sunday afternoon chamber music events, the "Cocoa Concerts" for children aged 5–10, the Haydn-Mozart series, and where soloists of the concertos are members of the orchestra, and the "Open Dress Rehearsals".

In November 2008, the Gramophone magazine selected the BFO into the world's 20 best orchestras as No. 9. In 2022, BFO won Gramophone's Orchestra of the Year Award.

Ever since its foundation, the BFO's Music Director has been Iván Fischer who has conducted most of its 70-plus albums.
