= Iván Fischer =

Hungarian conductor and composer (born 1951)

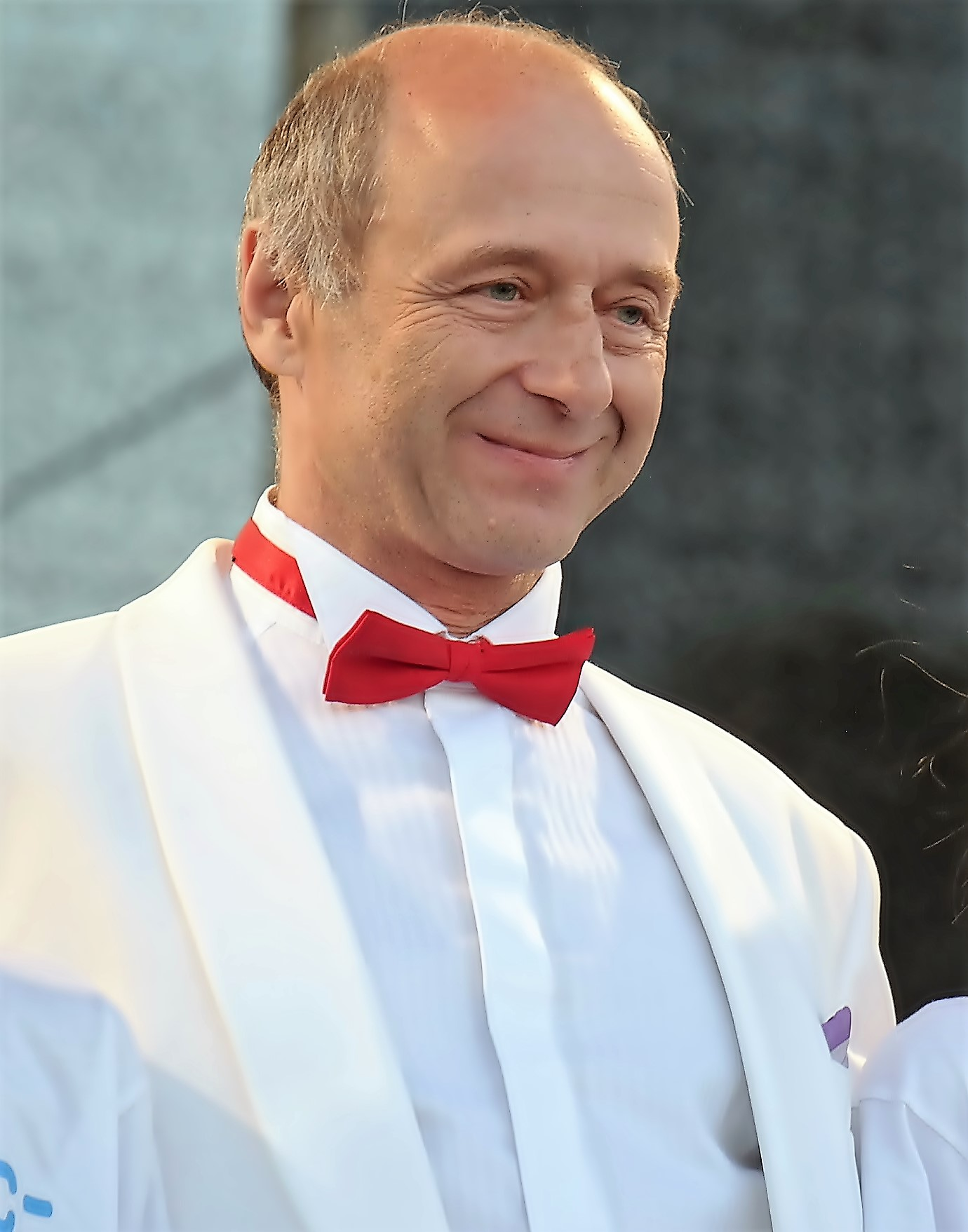
- Iván Fischer, Budapest, 2015

Background information
- Born: 20 January 1951 (age 75); Budapest, Hungary
- Occupations: Conductor; composer

Iván Fischer (born 20 January 1951) is a Hungarian conductor and composer.

== Biography ==
Born in Budapest into a musical family of Jewish heritage, Fischer initially studied piano, violin, cello and composition in Budapest. His older brother, Ádám Fischer, became a conductor in his own right. He moved later to Vienna to study conducting with Hans Swarowsky at the University of Music and Performing Arts, where he also studied cello and early music, studying and working as assistant to Nikolaus Harnoncourt. He also studied with Franco Ferrara at the Accademia Musicale Chigiana in Siena.

In 1976, Fischer won the Rupert Foundation conducting competition in London. He began thereafter to guest-conduct British orchestras such as the Royal Liverpool Philharmonic, the BBC Symphony and the London Symphony Orchestra, with whom he conducted a world tour in 1982. His US conducting debut was with the Los Angeles Philharmonic in 1983.

== Budapest Festival Orchestra ==
Fischer returned to Hungary in 1983 to found the Budapest Festival Orchestra (BFO), which initially was intended for a limited number of concerts a year on a part-time basis. The BFO became a permanent institution in 1992, with a schedule of about 30 weeks of performing a year. With the BFO, he has incorporated unorthodox ideas into practice, including allowing individual symphony musicians to contribute to concert programming, as in the "cocoa-concerts" for young children. Other series include the Titok-koncert ("bag of surprise") concert series where the programme is not announced, "one forint concerts" where he talks to the audience, open-air concerts in Budapest attracting tens of thousands of people, as well as concert opera performances. Fischer has founded several festivals, including a summer festival in Budapest on baroque music and the Budapest Mahlerfest which is also a forum for commissioning and presenting new music works. In addition, there is an annual competition from within the orchestra for soloist opportunities in concert. Fischer and the BFO have recorded commercially for Philips Classics and Channel Classics Records.

Iván Fischer accolades for teachers. In the second part he conducts Johannes Brahms: Hungarian Dances No. 17 during the libre Tértánc event, 2018

== Other symphonic work and opera ==
In the US, Fischer held the position of principal guest conductor of the Cincinnati Symphony Orchestra for seven years. In 2006, he became principal guest conductor of the National Symphony Orchestra of Washington, D.C. In April 2007, Fischer was named the principal conductor of the National Symphony Orchestra (Washington, D.C.), after Leonard Slatkin stepped down as music director in 2008. He held the title for two years.

Fischer was music director at Kent Opera in the UK from 1984 to 1989. He was music director of the Opéra National de Lyon from 2000 to 2003. The Lyon production of Ariadne auf Naxos received the prize of Best Regional Opera Production of the Year given by the Association of French Music Critics. Other work in opera as a guest conductor has included a Mozart cycle in the Vienna State Opera, and productions in Zurich, London, Paris, Brussels, Stockholm and Budapest. He debuted in 2006 at Glyndebourne Festival Opera in a new production of Così fan tutte:

In 2006, Fischer was named principal artist of the Orchestra of the Age of Enlightenment. In February 2011, he was named music director of the Konzerthaus Berlin and principal conductor of the Konzerthausorchester Berlin, effective with the 2012–2013 season, with an initial contract of 3 years. In October 2016, the orchestra announced that Fischer is to stand down as its principal conductor after the 2017/2018 season, at which close he concluded his tenure in the post. In October 2020, the Royal Concertgebouw Orchestra announced the appointment of Fischer as its next honorary guest conductor (honorair gastdirigent), effective with the 2021–2022 season. In July 2024, the European Union Youth Orchestra announced the appointment of Fischer as its music director, with immediate effect.

In 2011, Fischer was awarded the Royal Philharmonic Society's Music Award and the Dutch Ovatie Prize. In 2013, he was named an honorary member of the Royal Academy of Music in London.

== Compositions ==
Fischer's compositions are usually written for intimate groups of human voices and instruments. His "Spinoza-Vertalingen" for soprano and chamber ensemble composed on a 17th-century Dutch translation of Baruch Spinoza's text has been performed in the Netherlands and Hungary. For women's choir, he composed "Zigeunerlied" (Goethe), "La Malinconia" (Umberto Saba), "29. Canzone di Petrarca", "Sait gesund" with a Yiddish text and "A nay kleyd" (Rokhl Korn). The last two were commissioned by the Dutch memorial day (Dodenherdenking) and broadcast on Dutch National TV. In 2011 he composed "de slome slak" (Joke van Leeuwen) for children's choir, commissioned by the Koorbiennale in the Netherlands and Festival Hymn 2011 commissioned by Young Euro Classic in Berlin. His most frequently performed work is "Eine Deutsch-Jiddische Kantate", which has been performed in the Netherlands, Germany, Austria, USA and Switzerland. His one-act opera The Red Heifer, "composed as a rebuke to what he and others see as growing tolerance for anti-Semitism in today's Hungary" was premiered at the Millennium Hall, Budapest, in October 2013.

== Recordings ==
Fischer signed an exclusive recording contract with Philips Classics in 1995 and his Bartók and Liszt recordings with the Budapest Festival Orchestra have won a Gramophone Award, Diapason d'Or de l'Annee, four Cles de Telerama, the Arte, MUM and Erasmus prizes. Other Philips recordings include works by Kodály, Dvořák and Fischer's own orchestration of Brahms's Hungarian Dances, which combine improvisations from Gypsy musicians with a symphony orchestra.

Since 2004, Fischer has recorded for Channel Classics Records. His recording of Mahler's Second Symphony with the Budapest Festival Orchestra for Channel Classics won a 2007 "Editor's Choice" Gramophone Award. Other Fischer/BFO releases have included Rachmaninoff's Symphony No. 2; an incomplete Mahler symphony cycle (excluding the 8th); Tchaikovsky's Symphonies No. 4 & 6; Brahms' Symphonies No. 1, 2 & 4; Beethoven' Symphonies No. 4, 6 & 7; Dvořák's Symphonies No. 7, 8 & 9; excerpts from Wagner's Die Meistersingers and Götterdämmerung; Richard Strauss's Josephslegende; and a release of his own compositions including Spinoza translations and Eine Deutsch-Jiddische Kantate. On DVD, his Glyndebourne performance of Mozart's Così fan tutte was nominated for Gramophone and Grammy Award.

== Awards ==
Fischer is a founder of the Hungarian Mahler Society, and patron of the British Kodály Academy. He received the Golden Medal Award from the president of Hungary, and the Crystal Award from the World Economic Forum for his services to help international cultural relations. The French Government named him Chevalier des Arts et des Lettres. In 2006, he was honored with the Kossuth Prize, Hungary's most prestigious arts award. He is an honorary citizen of Budapest and Vicenza. In 2011, he received the Royal Philharmonic Society Music Award in the conductor category.

== Invention ==
In response to COVID-19's impact, Fischer invented an acoustic face mask that featured plastic hands cupped around the wearer's ears. He said his masks "help to emulate church acoustics, with warmer undertones and clearer, sharper contours". Audience members said they improved the sound.

Cultural offices
Preceded by Christopher Seaman	Artistic Director, Music Director and Principal Conductor, Northern Sinfonia; 1979–1982 (with Tamás Vásáry)	Succeeded by Richard Hickox
Preceded by no predecessor	Music Director, Budapest Festival Orchestra; 1983–present	Succeeded by incumbent
Preceded by Louis Langrée	Music Director, Opéra National de Lyon; 2000–2003	Succeeded by Kazushi Ono
Preceded by Leonard Slatkin (music director)	Principal Conductor, National Symphony Orchestra; 2008–2010	Succeeded by Christoph Eschenbach (music director)
Preceded by Lothar Zagrosek	Principal Conductor, Konzerthausorchester Berlin; 2012–2018	Succeeded by Christoph Eschenbach
Preceded by Vasily Petrenko (chief conductor)	Music Director, European Union Youth Orchestra; 2024–present	Succeeded by incumbent
