= Dunst =

Dunst may refer to:

- Dunst (performance group), a queer performance network in Copenhagen, Denmark
- Kirsten Dunst, American actress
- Barbara Dunst, Austrian footballer
- Daniel Dunst, Austrian footballer
- Tony Dunst, American professional poker player
- Dunst Bruce, member of Chumbawamba, an English rock band
- Dunst Opening, an uncommon chess opening known by many names
- Maria Dunst, Hungarian singer
