= Albert Siklós =

Hungarian composer (1878–1942)

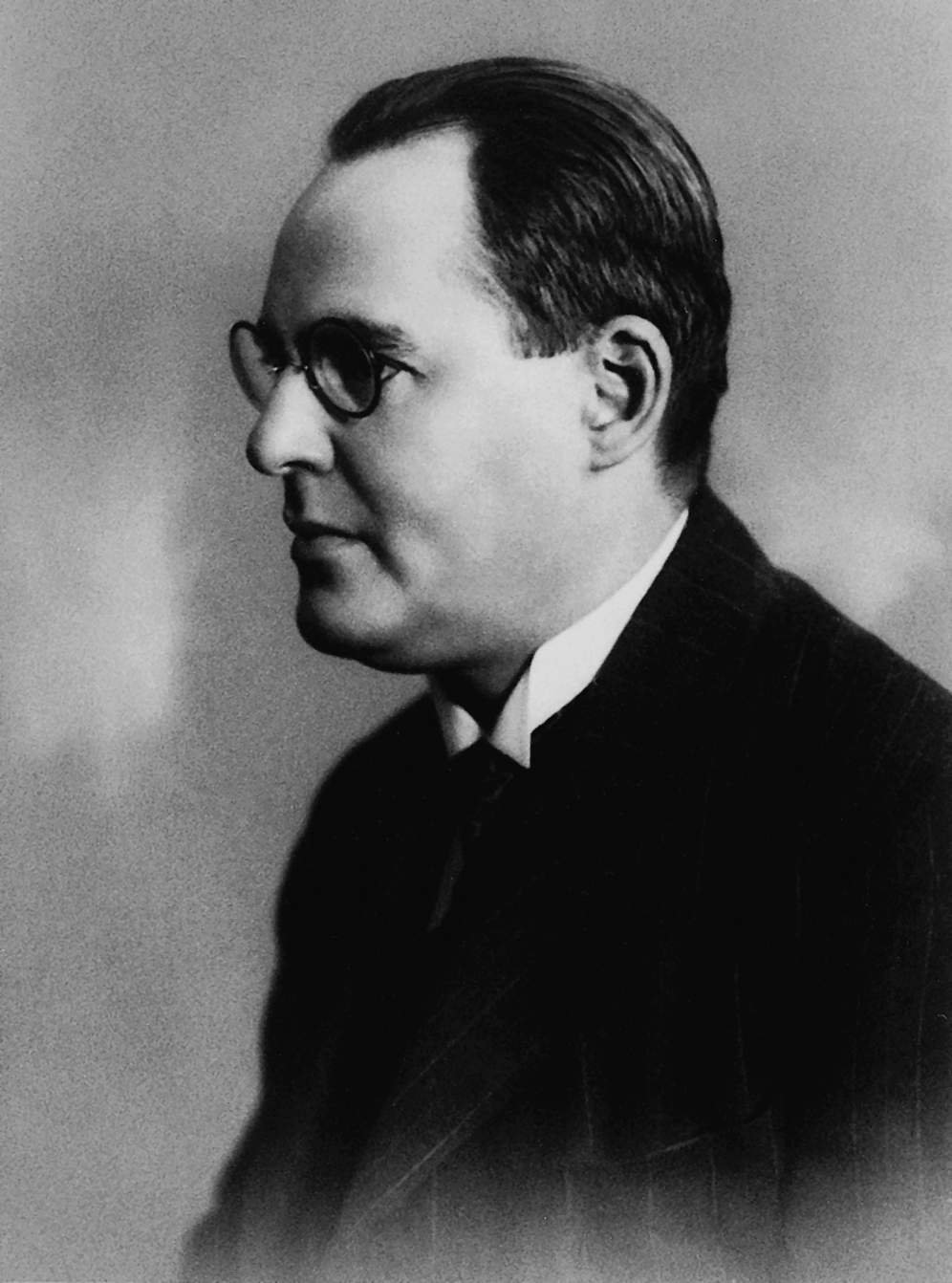
- Siklós, c. 1910–1915
- Born: Albert Schönwald; 26 June 1878; Budapest, Hungary
- Died: 3 April 1942 (aged 63); Budapest, Hungary
- Occupations: Composer; music educator; author
- Years active: 1918–1940s
- Style: Classical

Albert Siklós (born Albert Schönwald; 26 June 1878 in Budapest – 3 April 1942 in Budapest) was a Hungarian composer.

Siklós studied at the Royal National Hungarian Academy of Music under Hans von Koessler. From 1918 on, he taught composition, aesthetic and choir singing at the academy; in 1928, he became a ministerialis commissioner at the conservatory. One of his pupils was musicologist Lajos Kiss.

He composed two operas and a pantomime, two symphonies, a symphony for twelve double basses, four orchestral suites, two cello concertos, a piano concerto and one violin concerto. On the side, he penned a Hungarian music lexicon and a musical treatise.
