= Gaty =

Gaty or Gáty is a surname. Notable people with the name include:

- Andrew Gaty (born 1943), Australian film producer and distributor
- John Gaty (died 1963), American mechanical engineer
- Zoltán Gáty (1856–1928), Hungarian music teacher, conductor, and composer

== Fictional characters ==
- Gaty, a character from the fourth season of Battle for Dream Island, an animated web series
