= Gyula Dávid =

Hungarian violist and composer (1913–1977)

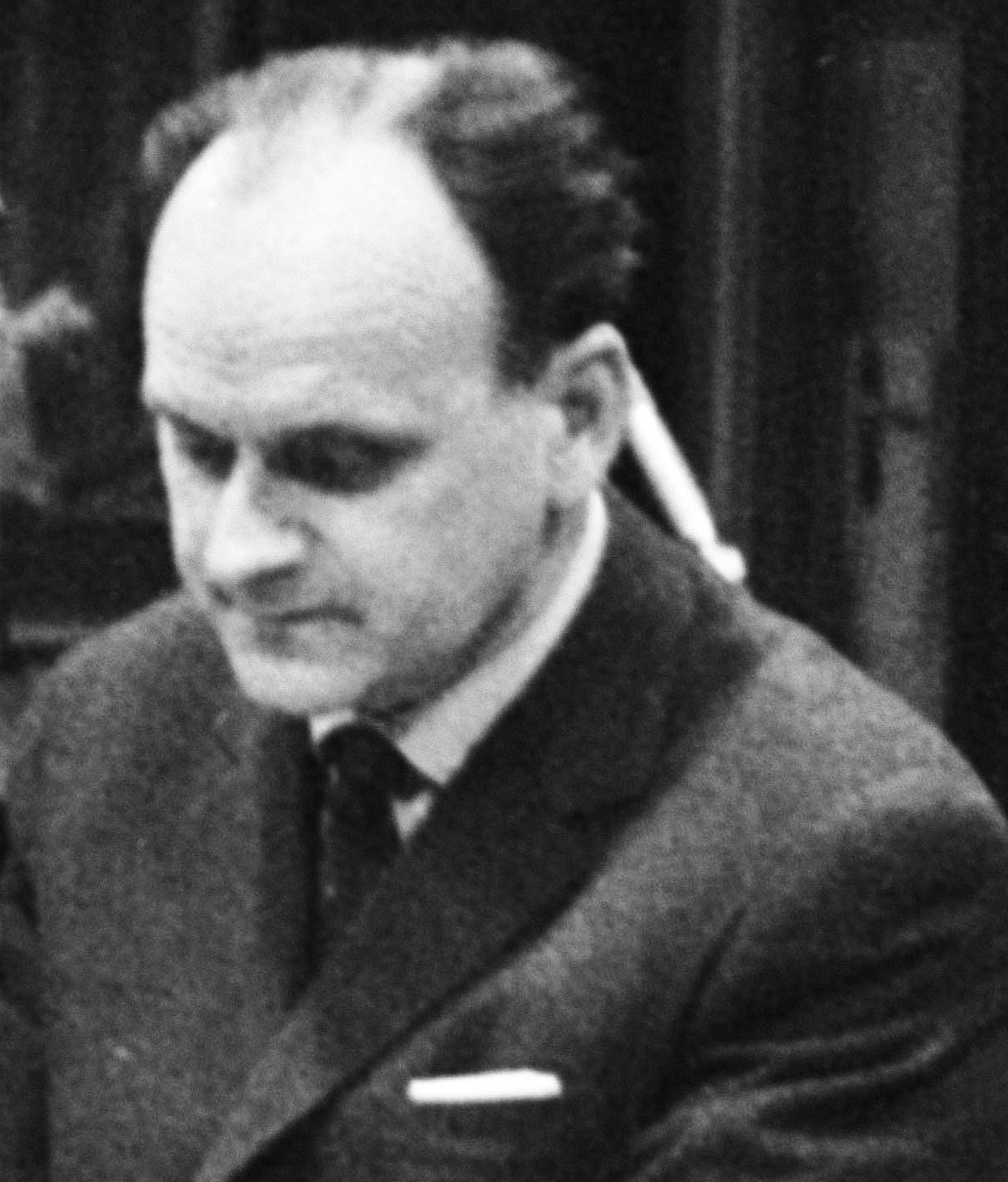
- Born: 6 May 1913
- Died: 14 March 1977 (aged 63)
- Education: Franz Liszt Academy of Music
- Occupations: violist composer

Gyula Dávid (6 May 1913 – 14 March 1977) was a Hungarian violist and composer.

== Life and career ==
Gyula Dávid was born in Budapest, Hungary on 6 May 1913. He studied composition with Zoltán Kodály at the Franz Liszt Academy of Music (FLAM) where he began his studies with the composer in 1938. He assisted Kodály with folk song collecting and a song he collected in Karád was utilized by Kodály as the basis for his composition Karádi nóták.

Dávid played viola with the Municipal Orchestra in Budapest from 1940 to 1943, and was a conductor at the National Theatre from 1945 to 1949. In 1950 he joined the faculty of the FLAM as a professor of wind chamber music. He remained in that position through 1960, and later became professor of chamber music at FLAM in 1964.

Dávid's music can largely be divided into two periods: his early compositions were influenced primarily by Hungarian folk song but also by Gregorian chant and Renaissance polyphony. This period lasted until 1960. ne of the most famous compositions of his first period is his Viola Concerto (1950). Those from his second period are more chromatic or 12-tone serial. He was awarded the Erkel Prize in 1952 and again in 1955. In 1957 he was the recipient of the Kossuth Prize.

Gyula Dávid died in Budapest on March 14, 1977.

== Selected works ==
Orchestral

- Symphony No. 1 (I. szimfónia) (1947)
- Tánczene, magyar népdalfeldolgozások (Dance Music, Based on Hungarian Folk Songs) (published 1952)
- Symphony No. 2 (II. szimfónia) (1957)
- Symphony No. 3 (III. szimfónia) (1960)
- Sinfonietta for small orchestra (1961)
- Színházi zene (Theatrical Music; Theatermusik) (published 1963)
- Symphony No. 4 (IV. szimfónia) (1970)
- Festive Overture (Ünnepi előjáték) (1972)

Concertante

- Concerto (Brácsaverseny) for viola and orchestra (1950)
- Concerto (Hegedűverseny) for violin and orchestra (published 1970)
- Concerto (Kürtverseny) for horn and orchestra (published 1976)

Chamber music

- Wind Quintet No. 1 (I. Fúvósötös) (published 1954)
- Sonata (Sonata fuvolára és zongorára) for flute and piano (published 1954)
- Serenade for wind quintet (1955)
- Preludio for flute and piano (1964)
- Wind Quintet No. 3 (III. Fúvósötös) (published 1965)
- Sonatina for viola and piano (1969)
- Miniature for 3 trumpets, 2 trombones and tuba (published 1971)
- Wind Quintet No. 4 (IV. Fúvósötös) (published 1971)
- Pezzo (Piece) for viola and piano (1974)
- Piano Trio (published 1974)
- String Quartet No. 2 (published 1976)
- Sonata for violin solo (published 1983)

Piano

- Piano Sonata (Szonáta zongorára) (1955)

Vocal

- A rózsalángolás (The Burning Rose), Chamber Music for female voice, flute and viola (1966); words by István Vas

== Discography ==
- Gyula Dávid: Viola Concerto – Pál Lukács (viola); János Ferencsik (conductor); Hungarian State Orchestra; Hungaroton HCD31989
- Gyula Dávid: Viola Concerto, Violin Concerto, Sinfonietta – Pál Lukács (viola); Dénes Kovács (violin); János Ferencsik, Ervin Lukács, Tamás Breitner (conductors); Hungarian State Orchestra, Budapest Symphony Orchestra; Hungaroton SLPX 12452 (LP)
