= Lívia Rév =

Hungarian-French pianist (1916–2018)

Lívia Rév (5 July 1916 – 28 March 2018) was a Hungarian classical concert pianist.

== Career ==
Rév was born in Budapest as Lili Rauchwerger. She began her studies with Margit Varró and Klára Máthé. Aged nine, she won the Grand Prix des Enfants Prodiges. Aged twelve she performed with an orchestra. She studied with Leó Weiner and Arnold Székely at the Franz Liszt Academy of Music, with Professor Robert Teichmüller at the Leipzig Conservatory, and with Paul Weingarten at the Vienna Conservatory, having left Hungary in 1946.

Among Rév's earliest recordings made around 1947 were a series of sixteen-inch radio transcription discs for the Standard Program Library. These included a virtuosic performance of Francis Poulenc's Toccata. She performed across Europe, in Asia, Africa, and in the United States. She was a soloist with such conductors as Sir Adrian Boult, André Cluytens, Jascha Horenstein, Eugen Jochum, Josef Krips, Rafael Kubelík, Hans Schmidt-Isserstedt, Constantin Silvestri and Walter Susskind.

Her first United States appearance was in 1963 at the invitation of the Rockefeller Institute. Her recordings for Saga and Hyperion vary from complete Debussy Préludes, Chopin Nocturnes and Mendelssohn Songs Without Words.. An early LP for the Ducretet-Thompson label included Chopin's complete waltzes.

== Personal life ==
Rév lived in Paris, with her husband Pierre Aubé, until her death on 28 March 2018, aged 101.

She was awarded the Ferenc Liszt International Record Grand Prix.
