= Pál Lukács =

Hungarian violinist and music pedagogue (1919–1981)

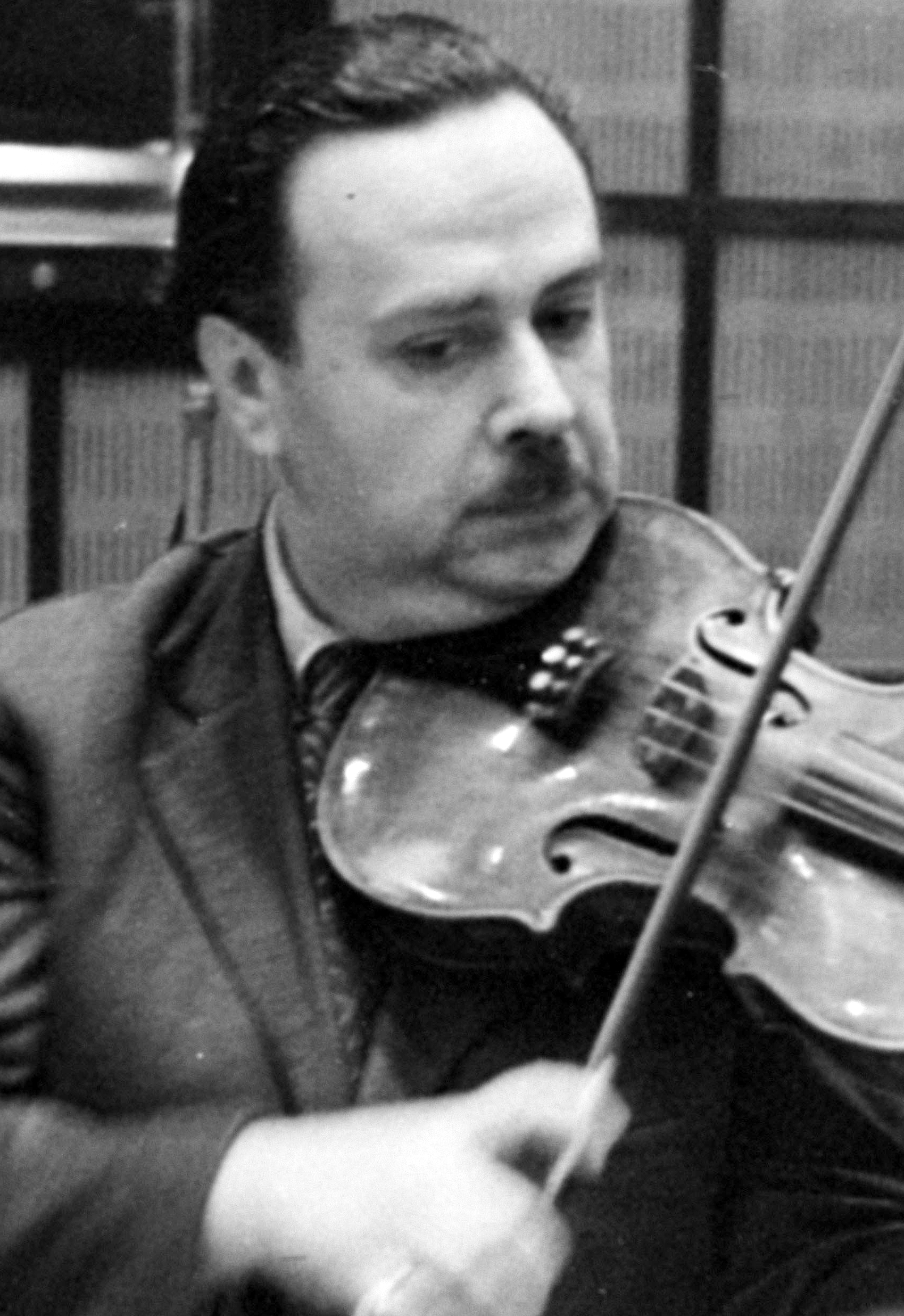
- Born: 27 April 1919; Budapest, Hungary
- Died: 22 May 1981 (aged 62); Budapest
- Education: Franz Liszt Academy of Music
- Occupations: viola virtuoso concert and recording artist music educator
- Awards: Artist of Merit of the Republic of Hungary Award (Magyar Köztársaság Érdemes Művésze) in 1952; Kossuth Prize in 1965; The Outstanding Artist Award of the Republic of Hungary (Magyar Köztársaság Kiváló Művésze díj) in 1971.

Pál Lukács (Hungarian: Lukács Pál; 27 April 1919 in – 22 May 1981) was a Hungarian viola virtuoso, concert and recording artist, and music educator.

Lukács studied voice, and also violin with Imre Waldbauer at the Franz Liszt Academy of Music in Budapest. He switched to viola in 1935 after hearing a viola performance by Lionel Tertis accompanied by pianist Clifford Curzon. In 1936 he became a member of the Hungarian State Opera Orchestra. Lukács joined the faculty of the Franz Liszt Academy of Music in 1946 as a music teacher, and the following year was appointed the first Professor of Viola by the academy, a position he held until 1981. In 1975, he was appointed head of the voice faculty.

From 1947 until 1976 Lukács performed as viola soloist throughout Europe. He was a prize winner at the 1948 Geneva International Music Competition.

Lukács was the recipient of many awards including the Artist of Merit of the Republic of Hungary Award (Magyar Köztársaság Érdemes Művésze) in 1952, Kossuth Prize in 1965 and the Outstanding Artist Award of the Republic of Hungary (Magyar Köztársaság Kiváló Művésze díj) in 1971.

In 1959, Lukács published an important pedagogical work for viola: Exercises in Change of Position for Viola, Advanced Grade (Fekvésváltó gyakorlatok mélyhegedűre, felső fokon; Lagenwechsel-Übungen für Bratsche in der höheren Ausbildungsstufe). He also prepared and edited many viola works for publication, notably those by László Weiner.

Lukács's students have won many honors and contests. Some notable students include Vidor Nagy, László Bársony, Zoltán Toth, Sándor Papp, Gabor Ormal, Géza Németh, and Csaba Erdélyi.

== Discography ==
- Béla Bartók: Concerto for Viola and Orchestra – Pál Lukács (viola); János Ferencsik (conductor); The Hungarian State Concert Orchestra; Deutsche Grammophon (LP) 135155
- Johannes Brahms: Viola Sonatas – Pál Lukács (viola); Andras Schiff (piano); Hungaroton (LP) (1978)
- Gyula Dávid: Viola Concerto – Pál Lukács (viola); János Ferencsik (conductor); Hungarian State Orchestra; Hungaroton HCD31989
- Gyula Dávid: Viola Concerto, Violin Concerto, Sinfonietta – Pál Lukács (viola); Dénes Kovács (violin); János Ferencsik, Ervin Lukács, Tamás Breitner (conductors); Hungarian State Orchestra, Budapest Symphony Orchestra; Hungaroton SLPX 12452 (LP)
- Pál Kadosa: Concertino for Viola and Orchestra – Pál Lukács (viola); Miklós Erdélyi (conductor); Budapest Philharmonic Orchestra; Hungaroton (LP) SLPX 11859 (1977)
- György Kósa: In memoriam... for viola solo – Pál Lukács (viola); Hungaroton (LP) SLPX 12367 (1982)
- Stamitz Viola Concerto – Pál Lukács (viola); Erzsébet Dénes (piano); György Lehel (conductor); Budapest Philharmonic Orchestra; Qualiton HLPX M 1026

Carl Stamitz: Viola Concerto in D major for viola and orchestra, Op. 1
Johann Adolph Hasse: Two Dances (Két tánc) for viola and piano
Zoltán Kodály: Adagio for viola and piano
Niccolò Paganini: Mosè Fantasia for viola and piano

- Hammer, Hummel, Nardini and Schubert – Pál Lukács (viola); Endre Petri (piano); Hungaroton (LP) SLPX 11459 (1970s)

Franz Schubert: Arpeggione Sonata
Johann Nepomuk Hummel: Viola Sonata in E♭ major, Op. 5 No. 3
Pietro Nardini: Viola Sonata in F minor
Franz Xaver Hammer: Viola da gamba Sonata No. 4 in G major; The Recorded Viola, Volume III; Pearl, Pavilion Records GEMM CDs 1950
