= Rezső Kókai =

Hungarian composer and musicologist

- Born: 15 January 1906; Budapest, Hungary
- Died: 6 March 1962 (aged 56); Budapest, Hungary
- Education: Franz Liszt Academy of Music
- Alma mater: University of Freiburg Ph.D. (1933)
- Occupation: Composer
- Years active: 1926–1962

Rezső Kókai (15 January 1906 – 6 March 1962) was a Hungarian composer and musicologist.

== Life ==
Kókai studied composition with János Koessler and piano with Emánuel Hegyi at the Franz Liszt Academy of Music. In 1933 he received his doctorate in musicology from the University of Freiburg where he wrote the thesis Franz Liszt in seinen frühen Klavierwerken (Franz Liszt in His Early Piano Works). Between 1926 and 1934 he was professor of piano at the National Conservatory, and from 1929 taught composition, aesthetics, music history, and pedagogy at the Franz Liszt Academy of Music. Kókai was director of music for the Hungarian Radio from 1945 to 1948.

Kókai was awarded the Ferenc Erkel Prize (Erkel Ferenc-díj) three times in recognition of his work (1952, 1955, 1956).

Rezső Kókai composed in a variety of forms including stage works, orchestral compositions, a violin concerto, chamber music, works for piano, as well as film and radio scores. His scores are largely published by Editio Musica Budapest and Zeneműkiadó Vállalat.

== Selected works ==
Stage

- István király (King Stephen), Scenic Oratorio in 2 acts, 5 scenes (1941)
- A rossz feleség, Táncballada (A Bad Wife), Dance Ballad (1942–1945)
- A fekete város (The Black City), Opera (1961); unfinished

Radio scores

- A fülemile (1950)
- Lészen ágyú, radio opera (1951); libretto by Péter Halász and József Romhányi
- Hét falu kovácsa (1954)

Orchestral

- 2 Rondos for small orchestra (1946–1947)
- Verbunkos-szvit (Verbunkos Suite) (1950)

1. Lassú magyar (Slow Hungarian Dance)
2. Friss (Lively Hungarian Dance)
3. Andalgó (Phantasy)
4. Verbunkos induló (Recruiting March)

- Széki rhapszódia (Rhapsody on Hungarian Dance Tunes from Szék) (1952)
- Kis verbunkos zene (Little Hungarian Verbunkos Dance) for student string orchestra (1952)
- Concerto all'ungherese (1957)
- Magyar tánc (Hungarian Dances) for student string orchestra (1959)

Concertante

- Concerto for violin and orchestra (1952)

Chamber music

- Serenade for violin, viola and cello (1949–1950)
- Két tánc (2 Dances) for cello and piano (1950)
- Négy Magyar tánc (4 Hungarian Dances) for clarinet and piano (1951)

1. Verbunkos (Recruiting Dance)
2. Népi tánc (Folk Dance)
3. Sirató tánc (Mourning Dance)
4. Friss (Fresh)

- Capriccio for violin and piano (1952)
- Quartettino for clarinet, violin, viola and cello (1952)
- Rapszódia for clarinet and folk orchestra (1952)
- Verbunkos rapszódia (Verbunkos Rhapsody) for violin (or viola, or clarinet) and piano (1952)
- Aria seria for violin and piano (1953)
- Burla ostinata for violin and piano (1953)

Piano

- Toccata (1926)
- Sonata quasi una fantasia (1948)
- Négy improvizáció (4 Improvisations) (1949)
- Sonata for 2 pianos (1949)

Film scores

- Különös ismertetőjel (1955); directed by Zoltán Várkonyi
- A császár parancsára (1957); directed by Frigyes Bán
- Pillar of Salt (Sóbálvány) (1958); directed by Zoltán Várkonyi
- Poor Rich (Szegény gazdagok) (1959); directed by Frigyes Bán

Literary

- Franz Liszt in seinen frühen Klavierwerken, doctoral thesis (Leipzig, 1933)
- Rendszeres zeneesztétika (Regular Music Aesthetics) (Budapest, 1938)
- Századunk zenéje (The Music of Our Century) (Budapest, 1961); co-authored with Imre Fábián
