= Gabriel von Wayditch =

American classical composer

Gabriel von Wayditch (28 December 1888, Budapest – 28 July 1969 New York City) was a Hungarian-American composer whose output consisted primarily of 14 grand operas. The son of Dr. Aloysious (Lajos) von Wayditch von Verbovac (Verbovác), a nobleman and inventor who had taught physics at the University of Pécs, and Helena von Dönhoff, a Prussian baroness, who was according to familytrees related to the ancient magyar Árpád dynasty. Gabriel (Wayditch Gábor) was born in Budapest. He studied piano, conducting, and composition at the National Hungarian Academy of Music (now the Franz Liszt Academy of Music) where his teachers included Franz Liszt's pupil Emil von Sauer and Hans von Koessler, who was also the teacher of composers Béla Bartók, Zoltán Kodály, Ernő Dohnányi, and Kálmán Emmerich.

== Life and career ==
In 1910, Gabriel von Wayditch began composing his first opera, Ópium Álmok (Hungarian for 'Opium Dreams'), for which he also wrote his own Hungarian libretto. But after his parents separated, he emigrated to the United States with his father before completing it, arriving in New York harbor in 1911. In New York City, Wayditch worked as a theater conductor while completing Ópium Álmok, which lasts 4 hours and requires an orchestra of some 110 players. Upon its completion, there was no performance of it. Wayditch subsequently derived two orchestral suites and his sole piano composition, Reminscences from Opium Dreams, from the thematic material in that opera. But none of these works received public performances either.

During the remainder of the decade he composed two additional operas, both somewhat shorter though requiring the same massive orchestration: Suh és Sah (The Caliph's Magician) (1917) and Jézus Heròdes elött (Jesus Before Herod) (1918). Although both of these works were performed after his death, he heard neither during his lifetime. During the 1920s and 1930s, he composed six additional operas, most lasting nearly five hours and all featuring his own librettos, in Hungarian, and a very large orchestra, all without any impetus of an impending production, working in almost complete isolation in an apartment in the Bronx. In addition to requiring a very large orchestra and being written in Hungarian, a language spoken by few Americans (although Wayditch also provided an alternate English text), many of Wayditch's operas contain other impracticalities. Most last nearly five hours, many call for frequent scene changes, and all have plots involving intricate historical myths that take place in exotic lands, in ancient times, or on other planets. Though the early operas were post-Romantic in style, the later works are much more modern and are heavily dissonant. For each opera, Wayditch notated by hand a full orchestral score and a piano reduction, though he produced no separate parts for individual players.

The only opera staged in his lifetime was the ancient Egyptian-themed Horus, which was presented by the Philadelphia La Scala Opera Company at the Academy of Music in Philadelphia on January 5, 1939 with Fritz Mahler conducting. The performance received a negative review in The Philadelphia Inquirer from Henry Pleasants, a harsh critic of contemporary music who later wrote a frequently-referenced anti-contemporary music polemic, The Agony of Modern Music. However, that performance of Horus was included by Nicolas Slonimsky in his compendium of significant musical events of the 20th century, Music Since 1900.

In the 1940s, Wayditch composed another four large scale operas, still with no promise of eventual performance. In the 1950s, he served as the pianist for the Morningside Trio, which concertized throughout New York City, and also taught music lessons at a studio near his apartment. Despite his abilities as a pianist, Wayditch never composed any additional compositions for the piano and apart from two songs for voice and piano and a quintet arrangement, Lullaby, derived from his 1925 opera Mária Testvér, he composed no chamber music. For the next 20 years, the only other composition he worked on for the remainder of his life was a massive eight-hour-long opera, Eretnekek (The Heretics), for which he completed a piano-vocal score. Wayditch died while writing out the 2,850th page of the orchestral score for that work. Still, The Heretics is cited in the Guinness Book of World Records as the longest opera ever written.

Though Wayditch's prodigious output was practically unknown during his lifetime, there has been some interest in his music over the past decades. Two of his early operas – The Caliph's Magician (1917) and Jesus Before Herod (1918) – were released on LP recordings by Musical Heritage Society in the 1970s. The former featured the orchestra, chorus and soloists of the Budapest Opera conducted by András Kórodi, and was sung using Wayditch's original Hungarian text. The latter was sung in an English translation in a production featuring the San Diego Symphony Orchestra and Chorus conducted by Peter Eros. The Mormon Tabernacle Choir sang Wayditch's Prayer from Maria Testver on a nationally televised broadcast. In 1984, on the fifteenth anniversary of his death, all of the commercially released recordings of Wayditch's music along with private recordings of excerpts and extracts from other works were featured in the Gabriel von Wayditch Memorial Broadcast aired on WKCR-FM, the radio station of Columbia University. In the 1990s, the three MHS LPs were re-issued in a 2 CD package by VAI. In October 2009, the Hungarian Culture Center mounted a presentation about Wayditch at the Brooklyn Museum featuring a performance of Reminscences from Opium Dreams by pianist Lloyd Arriola, a short ballet featuring excerpts from the two recorded operas, and a talk by Frank J. Oteri, who wrote the entry on Gabriel von Wayditch for the Revised New Grove Dictionary of Music and Musicians.

== Works ==
=== Operatic ===
- Ópium Álmok (Opium Dreams) (1910–1914) – 586pp piano reduction; 1200pp orchestral score
- Suh és Sah (The Caliph's Magician) (1917) – 163pp piano reduction; 483pp orchestral score
- Jézus Heròdes elött (Jesus Before Herod) (1918) – 91pp piano reduction; 186pp orchestral score
- Enyészet országa (Land of Death) (1920) – 424pp piano reduction; 846pp orchestral score
- Mária Testvér (Sister Maria) (1925) – 486pp piano score; 1251pp orchestral score
- Föld lelke a Vénuszon (Venus Dwellers) (1925) – 873pp piano reduction; 917pp orchestral score
- Horus (1931) – 296pp piano reduction with stage directions; 480?pp orchestral score
- Maria Magdolna (Mary Magdalene) (1934) – 246pp piano reduction; 444pp orchestral score
- Buddha (1935) – 534pp piano reduction; 936pp orchestral score
- Nereida (1940) – 282pp piano reduction; 637pp orchestral score
- Páduai Szerit Antal (Anthony of Padua) (1942) – 617pp piano reduction; 1279pp orchestral score
- Rezesztények (Catacombs) (1945) – 241pp piano reduction; 633pp orchestral score
- Álmok (Fisherman's Dreams) (1948) – 490?pp piano reduction; 1479pp orch score (2 vls)
- Eretnekek (The Heretics) (1949–1969) – 1531pp piano reduction; 2850pp orchestral score, incomplete

=== Other ===
- Reminscences from Opium Dreams for solo piano
- Opium Dreams Suite, Parts 1 and 2 for orchestra
- Lullaby from Maria Testver for flute and string quartet
- Prayer from Maria Testver for chorus and organ
- "Hudson River", song (in English) for voice and piano
- "Bedbug Serenade", song (in English) for voice and piano

== See also ==
- Vajdič
