= Lajos Kiss (ethnomusicologist) =

Hungarian ethnomusicologist (1900–1982)

Lajos Kiss (14 March 1900 – 18 May 1982) was a Hungarian ethnomusicologist, music educator, academic administrator, conductor, editor, and folk-song collector.

== Early life and education ==
Lajos Kiss was born in Zombor, Kingdom of Hungary (now Sombor, Yugoslavia) on 14 March 1900. He graduated with a degree in Latin from Budapest University (now Eötvös Loránd University) in 1923; followed by a degree in music from the Franz Liszt Academy of Music in 1925. At the latter school he studied music composition with Albert Siklós.

== Career and later life ==
Kiss began his career in his native city of Zombor where he worked as a conductor and music educator from 1926 through 1939. He joined the academic staff of the Stanković Musical School in 1939 where he worked for three years as its deputy headmaster and choral conductor. He left that institution in 1941 when he was appointed director and professor of conducting at the Ujvidék Conservatory of Music; a role he maintained until becoming director of the Győr State Conservatory (GSO; later merged into Széchenyi István University) in 1945. In 1950 he served as principle conductor of the Győr Philharmonic Orchestra.

Kiss was director of the GSO until 1950 when he left to take a position as a research fellow in ethnomusicology at the Hungarian Academy of Sciences (HAS). There he studied Hungarian folk music and was a noted folk music collector. Songs and music he collected were published in several books he compiled: Horgosi népdalok (1974), Lőrincréve népzenéje: Karsai Zsigmond dalai (1982), and A Jugosláviai Magyar népzene tára (published posthumously in `1984). He remained at the HAS until his retirement in 1970. During his time at the HAS he was one of the editors of the journal Corpus Musicae Popularis Hungaricae. He also contributed articles to the Journal of the International Folk Music Council, Tánctudományi tanulmányok, and Ethnographia among other publications.

He died on 18 May 1982.
