= B. Radó Lili =

Hungarian writer, translator, poet (1896–1977)

B. Radó Lili (born Balassa Árpádné; 5 June 1896 – 19 September 1977) was a Hungarian poet, youth writer, and literary translator.

== Biography ==
Radó Lili graduated from the singing department of the National Music Academy. She began her writing career in 1911, contributing to provincial journals before moving on to publications in Budapest. Over her lifetime, she authored 17 volumes, including youth poems, storybooks, youth songs, and choral works. Radó Lili was also actively involved with youth magazines and the Youth Radio. Her works have been translated into Finnish, German, Italian, and Swedish. Notably, she translated numerous youth novels and poems. During the period of the German invasion in March 1944 until liberation, she maintained a diary while residing in starry houses with her family. Radó Lili was a member of the Art Fund of the Hungarian People's Republic and the Hungarian PEN Club.

One of her notable contributions is as the lyricist of the song "The Cheerful Pioneer", colloquially known as "The Sample Squirrel", She is buried in Farkasréti Cemetery.

== Personal life ==
Radó Lili was born to Dr. Lajos Radó (Rosenblüth) (1863–1915), a lawyer from Kisvárda, and Mária Vadász (Weinberger). She lost her mother at a young age. Her paternal grandparents were Dr. Bernát Rosenblüth and Johanna Fuchs, while her maternal grandparents were Ignác Weinberger and Ilka Berger.

She married Árpád Balassa (Berger), an architect, on 25 December 1918, in Budapest. Radó Lili had two children: Mária Balassa (1919–1981), a doctor, and Tamás Balassa P., a composer, conductor, and pianist.

== Selected works ==
- Ketten a mirrors előtt (poems, Budapest, 1931)
- I feel I lived (poems, Budapest, 1935)
- Little Songs about Animals (with music by Tibor Kazacsay, 1937)
- Tales of Aunt Lili (Budapest, 1937)
- Songs in the Night (poems, Budapest, 1942)
- Little child, little bird, little flower (stories, poems, children's songs with music by Tamás Balassa, Budapest, 1943)
- The Cunning Masha (illustrated storybook, Budapest, 1948)
- The City of the Red Flower (storybook, Budapest, 1949)
- Colourful Tales (Budapest, 1949)
- Vidám veteményeskert (book of poems and pictures, Budapest, 1949)
- The Sorrow of King Petty (fairy tale, Budapest, 1966)
