= György Sebők =

Hungarian-born American pianist and professor

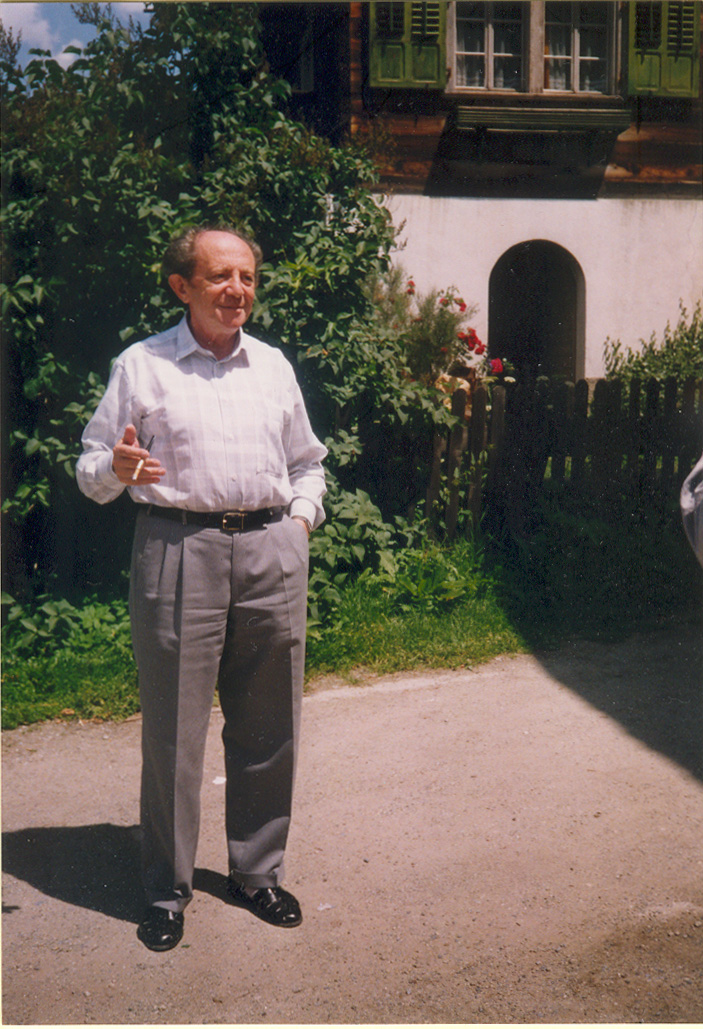
- Pianist György Sebők in Ernen 1991
- Born: November 2, 1922; Szeged, Hungary
- Died: November 14, 1999 (aged 77); Bloomington, Indiana, US

György Sebők (November 2, 1922 – November 14, 1999) was a Hungarian-born American pianist and professor at the Indiana University's Jacobs School of Music in Bloomington, Indiana, United States.

He was known worldwide as a soloist with major orchestras, a recitalist on four continents, a recording artist, and for his master classes, visiting professorships, and the Swiss music festival he organized in Ernen.

== Biography ==
Sebők was born in Szeged, Hungary, on 2 November 1922.

He gave his first solo piano recital at age 11. At 14, he played Beethoven's Piano Concerto No. 1 under conductor Ferenc Fricsay — a performance upon which he would reflect many years later.

He enrolled in the Franz Liszt Academy at the age of 16, under the guidance of Zoltán Kodály and Leo Weiner. After graduating, he was conscripted into the German army; as a Jew he was made to work breaking rocks in the Carpathian Mountains for construction of roads. After the war he gave concerts for ten years throughout Eastern and Central Europe and the former Soviet Union.

He won the Grand Prix du Disque in 1957. Sebők was listed in Who's Who in America, Who's Who in Music, the National Register of Prominent Americans, and other biographical dictionaries. He received numerous honors, including the Cross of Merit of the Hungarian Government, La Medaille de la Ville de Paris, Echelon Vermeille, and, in 1996, Kulturpreis des Staates Wallis, (Prix de Consecration). Also in 1996, the French Government bestowed on him the decoration Chevalier de L'Ordre des Arts et des Lettres.

== Teaching ==
In 1949, he was named professor of music at the Béla Bartók Conservatory in Budapest. After the Hungarian revolt of 1956, he settled in Paris and began recording for Erato. Encouraged by his cellist friend János Starker, at the age of forty, he went to Indiana University School of Music in Bloomington, starting what is considered to be the most productive phase of his career. Jeremy Denk dedicated his memoir "Every Good Boy Does Fine: A Love Story in Music Lessons" to Sebők, and wrote about the profound impact that Sebők had upon his musical upbringing and career. Starker called him "the greatest pianist who ever lived" and one of the greatest teachers.

Sebők was a guest professor of the Berlin Hochschule der Künste (HdK) in Germany, there teaching master classes twice a year. He was also an honorary life member of Tokyo's Toho School of Music, and a regular guest teacher at the Banff Centre for Arts; the Amsterdam Sweelinck Conservatorium, the School of Music in Barcelona, and the Hochschule für Musik in Stuttgart. In 1973 he founded and organized annual summer master classes in Ernen, Switzerland for pianists and 'other instruments', and the following year he was a member the jury for the first Paloma O'Shea Santander International Piano Competition. He also founded and directed the "Festival der Zukunft" in Ernen in 1987, which is to this day carrying his legacy with growing numbers of concertgoers. The city's officials made him an honorary citizen—only their third in 800 years.

== Primary sources ==
- In memoriam : György Sebők
- György Sebők - Artisttrove
- György Sebők - Allmusic
- Tracing Liabraaten's Musical Roots to Liszt & Beethoven
