= László Weiner =

Hungarian composer (1916–1944)

László Weiner (9 April 1916 in Szombathely, Hungary – 25 July 1944 in Lukov) was a Hungarian composer, pianist and conductor who was murdered in the Holocaust.

Weiner studied piano and conducting at the Budapest Music Academy and was a composition student of Zoltán Kodály from 1934 to 1940. Weiner was married in 1942 to singer Vera Rózsa.

By February 1943, Weiner had been deported by the Nazis to the Lukov forced labor camp in Slovakia where he was later murdered. Kodály attempted to save Weiner and colleague Jenő Deutsch to no avail.

Due to the efforts of violist Pál Lukács, several of Weiner's compositions were published by Editio Musica Budapest in the 1950s and 1960s.

== Selected works ==
Orchestral

- Concerto for flute, viola, piano, and string orchestra (1941?)
- Overture (published 1995)

Chamber music

- 1938: String trio "Vonosharmas Szerenad" for violin, viola, and cello
- Duo for violin and viola (1939)
- Sonata for viola and piano (1939?)
- Two Movements for clarinet and piano

Vocal

- Three Songs (published 1994)

== Discography ==
- Weiner: Chamber Music with Viola, Hungaroton HCD 32607
- In Memoriam: Hungarian Composers, Victims of the Holocaust, Hungaroton HCD32597
