= István Sárközy =

Hungarian composer (1920–2002)

István Sárközy (26 November 1920 – 6 July 2002) was a Hungarian classical composer, music critic, editor and academic teacher. His compositions date from the 1940s to 1979, and include works for musical theatre, choral works and songs, orchestral and chamber works, and works for piano. Notable examples include the stage works Liliomfi (1950) and Szelistyei asszonyok (The Women of Szelistye; 1951), the chamber cantata Júlia énekek (Julia Songs; 1956), the overture Az ifjúsághoz (To Youth; 1957), and the Sinfonia concertante for clarinet and strings (1963). He taught at the Franz Liszt Academy of Music from 1959.

== Biography ==
Sárközy was born in the Pesterzsébet suburb of Budapest in 1920. As a youth, he studied the piano with Lula Földessy-Hermann. He trained in composition with the composers Zoltán Kodály, Ferenc Farkas and János Viski at Budapest's Higher Music School (1938–39) and the Franz Liszt Academy of Music, Budapest (from 1939).

During the Second World War, Sárközy worked in statistics, while starting to compose, and afterwards held posts at the Liszt Academy (1945–47) and the Bartók College (National Conservatory; 1947–50). He reviewed music for the Népszava newspaper (1950–54), advised the Hungarian Recording Company and the National Philharmonic Concert Bureau (1954–57), and served as editor of the music publisher Editio Musica (1957–59), before rejoining the Liszt Academy in 1959. There he spent the rest of his career teaching music theory and composition, while continuing to compose until 1979.

Sárközy won the Erkel Prize for Liliomfi and Szelistyei asszonyok (1952), and a UNESCO prize for his overture To Youth (1957). In 1975, he was accorded the status of "Merited Artist of the Hungarian People's Republic". Some of his work was recorded on the Qualiton label.

He died in Budapest in 2002.

== Compositions and style ==
Sárközy was among the second generation of Kodály's pupils, coming to maturity during the war and composing at the height of the Communist régime, when contact with the music of Western Europe was cut off. The purpose of music was then seen as "serving the cultural needs of the masses", and light, accessible works were in vogue. Western musical influences resurfaced only after the uprising of 1956, and Hungarian composers first encountered movements such as serialism in the late 1950s and early 1960s. Sárközy was a confidant of the composer Endre Szervánszky, a leading composer of the post-1956 era, and György Kurtág dedicated works to him.

Sárközy composed works for musical theatre, choral works and songs, orchestral and chamber works, several foregrounding wind instruments, and works for piano. In a 1969 review, the British music critic Stephen Walsh describes his music as differing from that of other Hungarian composers of the time due to "its determination to be agreeable both to ear and to mind", concluding that in Sárközy's best works, at least, "his ideal of euphonious beauty by no means precludes profundity or originality of thought." Walsh draws a comparison with the work of Farkas, another of his teachers, stating that both employ "lightly weighted textures and elegant craftmanship, with a trace of baroque filigree". Bartók is another influence on some of Sárközy's works, and they frequently engage with ideas or structures from pre-20th-century music.

His earliest output was mainly ephemeral songs and arrangements of folk tunes. In 1943 he wrote the orchestral Concerto grosso (revised as Ricordanze I in 1969), which Mark Morris describes as "a neo-classical work, distorting Baroque ideas through a grotesquerie of harmonies as if through a distorting lens", with a Bartók-influenced slow movement. In the late 1940s and 1950s, Sárközy composed several staged works, notably Liliomfi (1950) and Szelistyei asszonyok (The Women of Szelistye; 1951). Júlia énekek (Julia Songs; 1956) – a cantata on texts by the 16th-century poet Bálint Balassi, accompanied by flute, harp and harpsichord – is named as the best of his earlier works in Grove's; Walsh describes it as "beautiful", and Morris calls it "haunting", drawing attention to the "deliberately archaic tone" and "ecstatic sensual" instrumentation. Other works from the 1950s include the one-movement Sonatina for piano duet (1956), a modal work described by Christopher Fisher and co-authors as "impressive ... sparkling, melodious; unusually effective"; and the orchestral overture Az ifjúsághoz (To Youth; 1957), described by Walsh as "thoroughly tuneful and likeable".

Important later works include the Sinfonia concertante for clarinet and strings (1963), one of his two finest works according to Walsh. His Sonata da camera for flute and piano (1964) was less well received. The composer Mark DeVoto criticises the balance between the two instruments; he describes the theme of the Andante as "unbelievably trivial", and states that the accompaniment of the final movement "went out with César Franck". A review in Music & Letters finds influences from Bartók and praises the piece's "idiomatic" composition for the flute and piano, but criticises its "rhythmic monotony", describing it as "virtuously dissonant and unutterably boring". During the 1970s Sárközy composed a comedic oratorio, Ypszilon-háború (1971), a song cycle, Sok gondom közt (Amid my Many Worries; 1972), the Concerto semplice (Ricordanze II) for violin and orchestra (1973), and several chamber pieces, including Ricordanze III for string quartet (1977). His final work was the Confessioni for piano and orchestra (1979), described by Morris as "rather brash".

== Selected discography ==
- Overture 'To Youth' (Qualiton; 1963) ((S)LPX-1166)
- Sonata da Camera (Qualiton) ((S)LPX-1246)
- Julia songs (Réti, tenor; Choir of Hungarian Radio & Television); The Poor One (Erika Sziklay, soprano; Budapest Choir; Hungarian State Orchestra, Karódi, conductor) (Qualiton) (SLPX-11371)
- Concerto grosso (Orchestra of Hungarian Radio and Television; György Lehel, conductor); Shepherd's Ballad, Three songs on poems by András Metzei (Erika Sziklay, soprano; Loránt Szűcs, piano); Sinfonia concertante (Béla Kovács, clarinet; Hungarian Chamber Orchestra) (Hungaroton; 1974) (SLPX-11667)
- Confessioni, Concerto semplice (Hungaroton; 1984) (SLPX 12515)
