= Dénes Kovács =

Hungarian classical violinist (1930–2005)

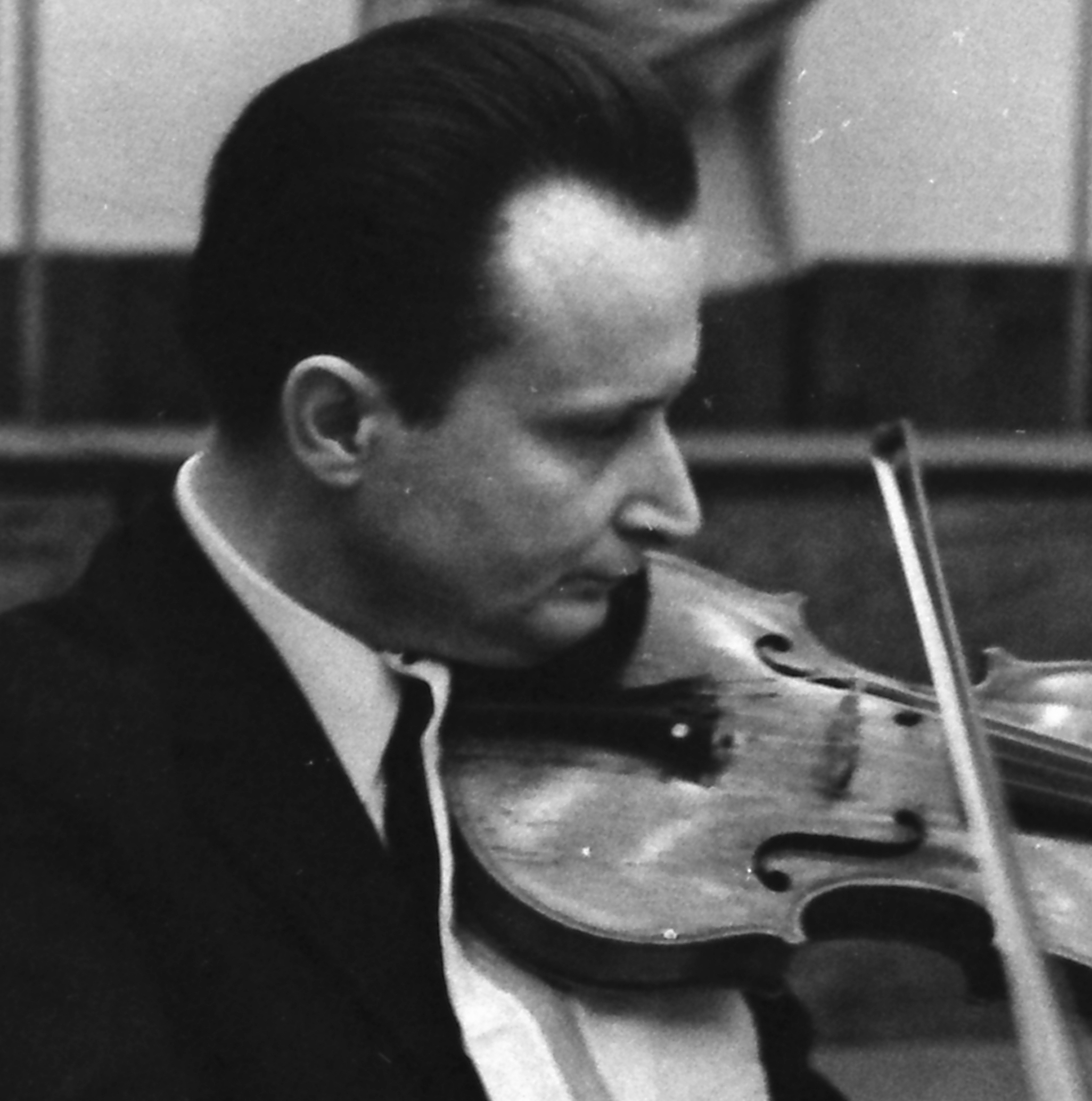
- Kovács in 1971
- Born: 18 April 1930; Vác, Hungary
- Died: 11 or 14 February 2005 (aged 74)
- Education: Fodor Music School; Franz Liszt Academy of Music
- Occupations: Classical violinist academic teacher
- Awards: The Liszt Prize (1954 or 1955 and 1958); The Kossuth Prize (1963); The Order of Labour (gold) (1974); The Béla Bartók–Ditta Pásztory Prize (1989 and 2000); The title of "Eminent Artist" (1970)

Dénes Kovács (18 April 1930 – 11 or 14 February 2005) was a Hungarian classical violinist and academic teacher, described as "pre-eminent among Hungarian violinists". He won the Carl Flesch International Violin Competition in 1955. In his career as a soloist and recording artist, he premiered and recorded the works of 20th-century Hungarian composers, and was also noted for his recordings of Bartók and Beethoven. From 1967 to 1980, he headed the Franz Liszt Academy of Music in Budapest, Hungary's principal music college. He received many national awards including the Kossuth Prize (1963).

== Early life and education ==
Kovács was born in 1930 in Vác, Hungary. He attended Fodor Music School, where he was taught by Dezső Rados, and in 1944 went to the Franz Liszt Academy of Music, Budapest, where he was a pupil of Ede Zathureczky, receiving his diploma in 1950 or 1951. His military service was spent playing in the orchestra of the army's Central Arts Ensemble (1950–51).

== Career ==
In 1951 Kovács joined the Budapest Opera as their first violin and leader, a position he held until 1960. He took third prize in the violin competition of the 3rd World Festival of Youth and Students in East Berlin in 1951, and in 1955, he won the Carl Flesch International Violin Competition in London, with performances of the Brahms Violin Concerto and Bach's Partita in D minor. From 1963 he was a soloist with the National Philharmonic. He performed within Hungary, across Europe, in China and the United States. Shortly after winning the Carl Flesch competition he participated in a Bartók memorial concert in London, in which he was described by Henry Raynor as playing with "aplomb". His regular duo partner was the pianist Mihály Bächer. His violin was a Guarneri del Gesù dating from 1742.

His playing is described in his Grove's profile as having a "crystalline tone and sense of style". Kovács' repertoire stretched from Baroque to mid-20th century composers such as Bartók. Described in Grove's as "pre-eminent among Hungarian violinists", Kovács premiered several works by 20th-century Hungarian composers, and he also recorded works by Gyula Dávid, Frigyes Hidas, Pál Kadosa, András Mihály and István Sárközy. His other notable recordings include Beethoven's complete string trios and sonatas for violin and piano, and contributions to the complete Bartók edition for Hungaroton.

Jim Samson, reviewing his recording of Bartók's Violin Concerto No. 2 and Rhapsodies No. 1 and No. 2 with the Budapest Symphony Orchestra conducted by Ervin Lukacs, describes both performances as "distinguished", especially the "cogent, well-shaped performance" of the concerto; however, he characterises the first movement as "uncomfortably fast", preferring Szerying's version. Samson criticises Kovács' interpretation of the rhapsodies as "rather too 'straight', lacking the discreet touches of rubato and telling variations in tone colour" of an earlier recording by André Gertler. Antoine Goléa, in a review of the complete Bartók set, describes two discs by Kovács as "essential" ("indispensables"): Violin Concerto No. 2 (reviewed by Samson) and the Sonata for Solo Violin. The Haydn expert H. C. Robbins Landon, in a review of a recording of Haydn's six sonatas for violin and viola with Géza Németh, praises the "careful and dedicated performances".

In 1957, Kovács started to work at the Liszt Academy, where he was head of department (1959) and professor (1964), before becoming the academy's acting director in around 1967, succeeding Ferenc Szabó. He continued to direct the academy as rector from 1971, after it was recognised as a university. In 1980, he stepped down as rector, remaining head of the string department. The Liszt Academy is Budapest's major college of music and under Kovác' directorship was regarded as the highest-status music institution in Hungary. During his time in charge, Kovács reorganised departments, giving autonomy to the chamber music and percussion departments, and inaugurated several prizes and competitions. In a 1972 publication, he was one of several academics to criticise the Kodály method, universally used to teach music in Hungary at that date, considering that the drilling of solmization did not impart artistic understanding – "Learning the alphabet does not create a desire for reading". From 1990, he conducted masterclasses at the Saint Stephen Specialist Music School.

He was honoured with several national awards in Hungary, including the Reményi Prize in 1949, the Liszt Prize (1954 or 1955 and 1958), the Kossuth Prize (1963), the Order of Labour (gold) (1974) and the Béla Bartók–Ditta Pásztory Prize (1989 and 2000), and was given the title of "Eminent Artist" (1970).

Kovács died in Budapest in 2005.
