= The Caliph's Magician =

American Opera

- Grand Opera by Gabriel von Wayditch
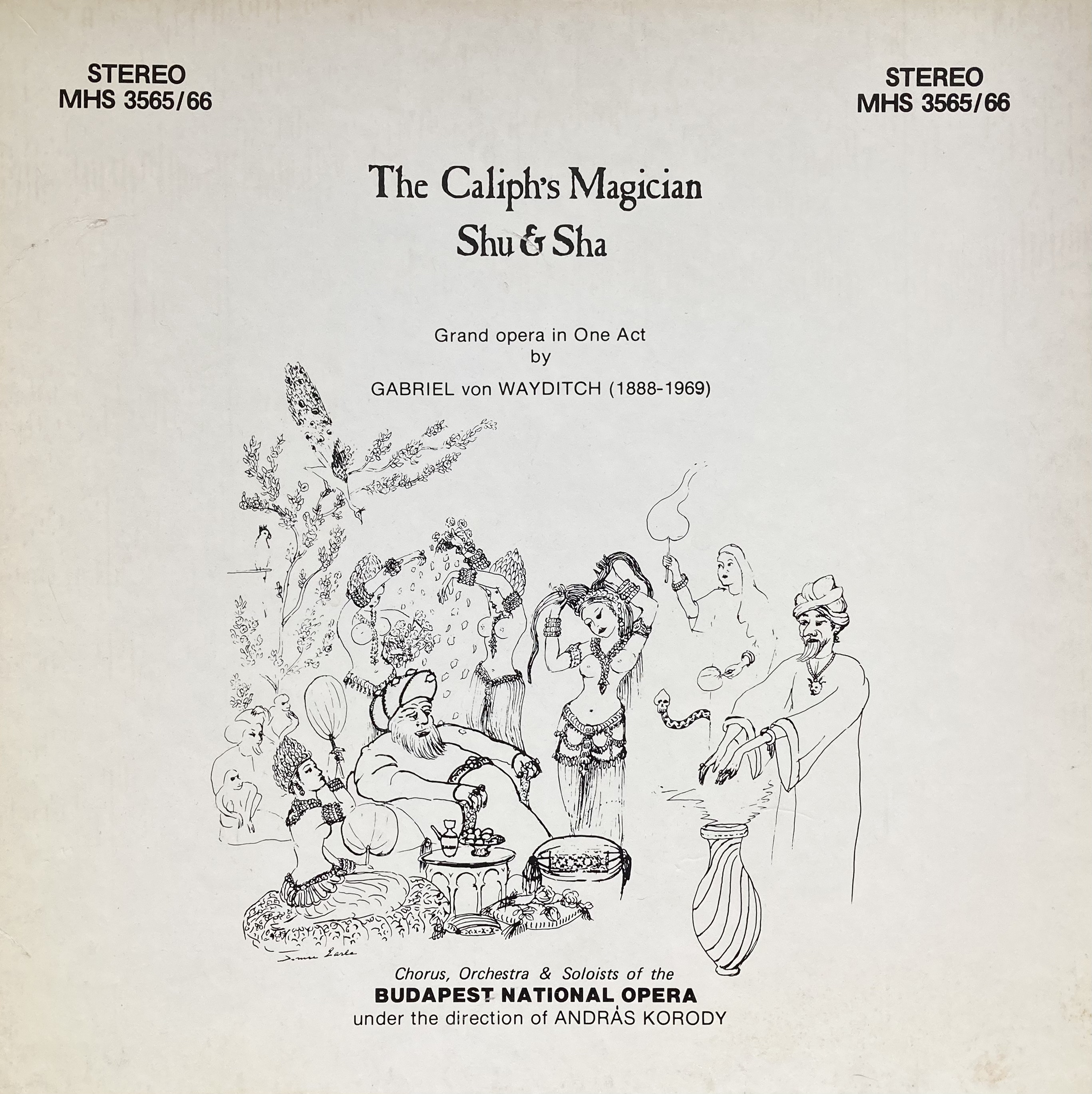
- Cover of the 1975 Recording of the Opera by the Hungarian State Opera
- Librettist: Gabriel von Wayditch
- Language: Hungarian

Suh és Sah (The Caliph's Magician) is an opera in one act by Hungarian-American composer Gabriel von Wayditch. The 95 minute opera was completed shortly before the composer's 30th birthday in 1917, and, like many of von Wayditch's works, has never been publicly performed. A recording of the opera was made by the Hungarian State Opera in 1975.

== Synopsis ==
In an unspecified kingdom, a magician has arrived to entertain the Caliph and his court. The magician conjures a mocking replica of the Caliph, called Suh, who lives only for pleasure and spends the day with his odalisque Sua. Suh's irresponsibility begins to harm him when he becomes ill, but he continues his life of leisure until he is killed by Sah, the spirit of evil who has been haunting Suh, in the guise of a serpent. When the tale is finished, the Caliph, who has become increasingly annoyed with the Magician, curtly asks him to leave and attempts to smash the Magician's magic amphora. The Magician conjures up a violent storm and escapes during the ensuing panic.

== Characters ==
Roles, voice types, cast of premiere recording (1975))
Role	Voice type	Premiere recording, 1975 Conductor: András Korody
The Caliph	bass	András Nagy-Soljom
The Magician - (Sah)	bass	Zsolt Bende
Nawab	tenor	István Rozsos
The Emir	tenor	Sándor Palcso
A Eunuch	soprano	Julia Pászthi
The favorite Odalisque	soprano	Csilla Ötvös
First Djinn	baritone	Csaba Ötvös
Second Djinn	tenor	Arpád Kishegyi
Suh	silent	
Sua	silent	
Amor	silent	
The Chief Surgeon	silent	
The Monkey Trainer	silent	
A Young Man	silent	
Janissaries, Visiting Maharajas, Spahis, Odalisques, Servants, and Attendants

== History ==
The opera has never been publicly performed but in 1975, von Wayditch's son, Ivan Walter von Wayditch, raised funds for the work to be recorded by the Hungarian State Opera. The recording was subsequently released on LP by the Musical Heritage Society and then reissued on CD by VAI, paired with another short von Wayditch opera, "Jesus Before Herod"
