= János Starker =

Hungarian-American cellist (1924–2013)

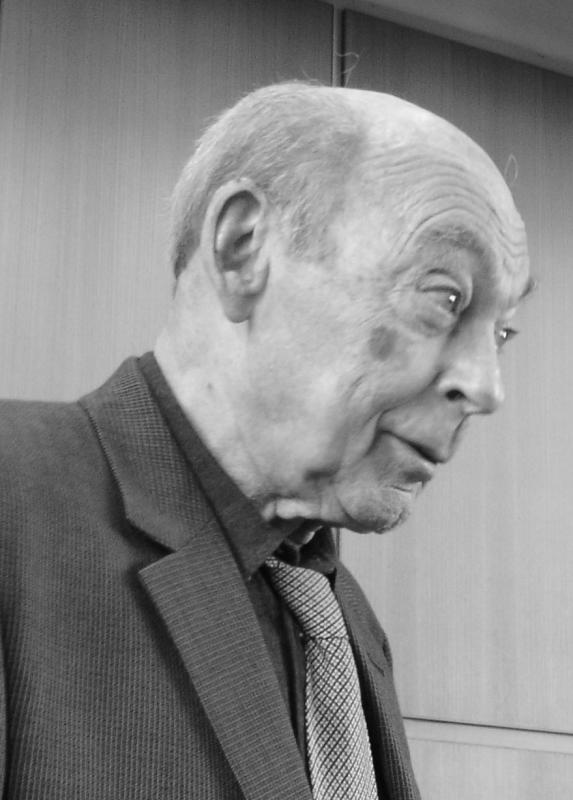
- Starker in 2009
- Born: July 5, 1924; Budapest, Hungary
- Died: April 28, 2013 (aged 88); Bloomington, Indiana, U.S.
- Occupation: Cellist

János Starker (/ˈstɑːrkər/; Hungarian: [ˈʃtɒrkɛr]; July 5, 1924 – April 28, 2013) was a Hungarian-American cellist. From 1958 until his death, he taught at the Indiana University Jacobs School of Music, where he held the title of Distinguished Professor. Starker is considered one of the greatest cellists of all time.

== Biography ==
=== Child prodigy ===
Starker was born in Budapest to a father of Polish descent and a mother who had immigrated from the Russian Empire, both Jewish. His two older brothers were violinists, and the young János (named for the hospital Szent János kórház [lit. St. John's Hospital] in which he was born) was given a cello before his sixth birthday. A child prodigy, Starker made his first public performances at ages six and seven. By the time he was eight, he was giving cello lessons to younger children and within a few years, he had five pupils. He entered the Franz Liszt Academy of Music in Budapest to study with Adolf Schiffer and made his debut there at age 11. Starker counted among his strongest influences Leo Weiner, a composer who taught chamber music. Zoltán Kodály, Béla Bartók and Ernő Dohnányi were also members of the Liszt Academy faculty. In his autobiography, Starker wrote that at the age of 13 he played Dohnányi's Konzertstück for Cello for the composer (who was then the director of the academy), who accompanied him at the piano.

Starker made his professional debut at age 14, playing the Dvořák concerto with three hours' notice when the originally scheduled soloist was unable to play. He left the Liszt Academy in 1939 and spent most of the war in Budapest. Because of his youth, Starker escaped the fate of his older brothers, who were pressed into forced labor and eventually murdered by the Nazis. Starker nevertheless spent three months in a Nazi internment camp.

=== Professional career ===
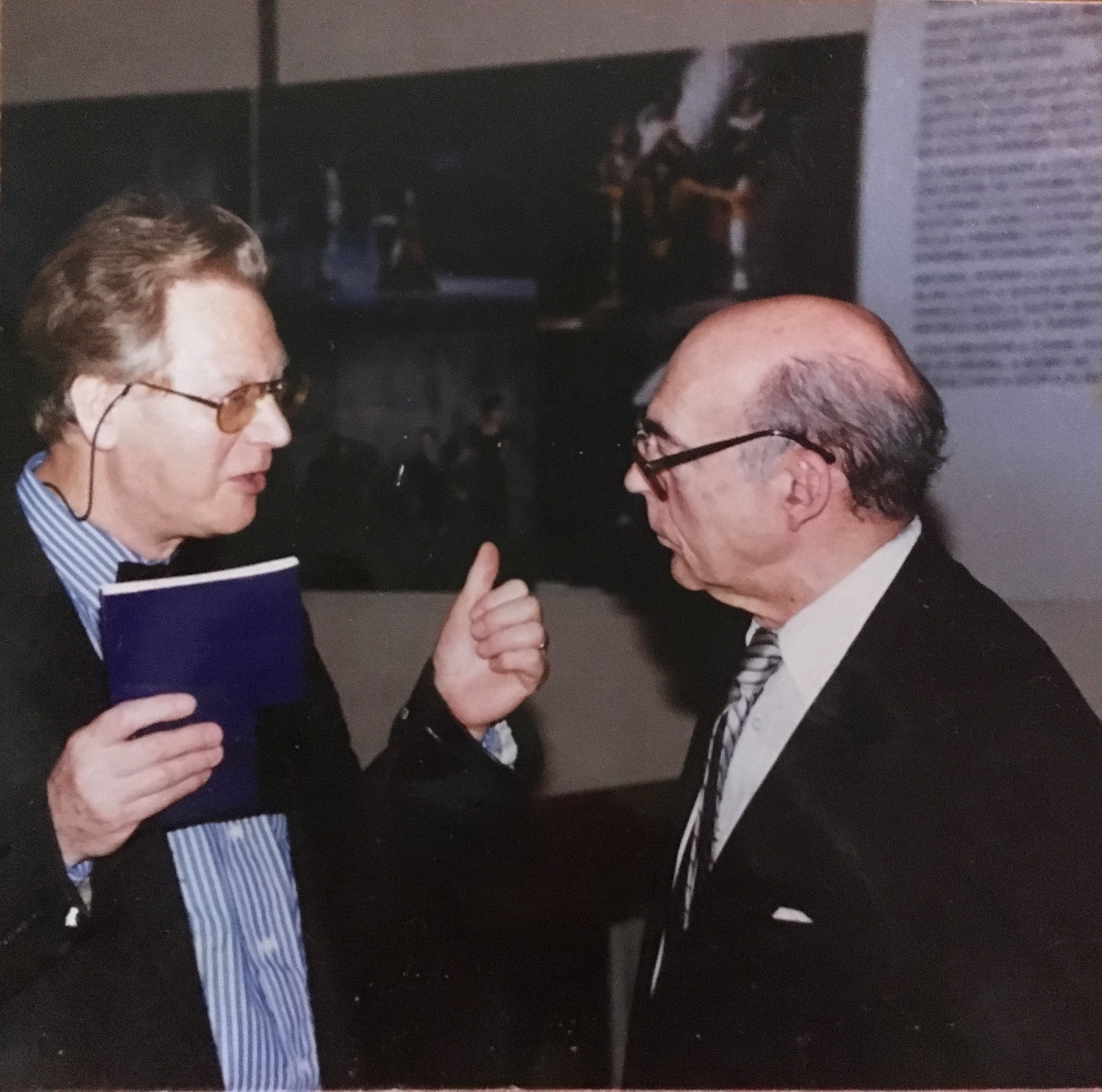
Starker (right) in 1995

After the war, Starker became principal cellist of the Budapest Opera and the Budapest Philharmonic Orchestra. Starker left Hungary in 1946.

He gave a successful concert in Vienna, then remained there to prepare for the Geneva Cello Competition. At the competition, held in October 1946, he received a bronze medal.

After competing in Geneva, Starker spent a year working on his technique in Paris. "I played like a blind man," he said. "What happens to the bird who flies and doesn't know how it flies? That's what happens to child prodigies." At the conclusion of his year in Paris, he made his first recording of Kodaly's Sonata in B minor for solo cello. The recording earned him the Grand Prix du Disque. He went on to make three more recordings of the work.

Starker emigrated to the United States in 1948 to become principal cellist of the Dallas Symphony Orchestra under Antal Doráti. In 1949, he moved to New York City to become principal cellist of the Metropolitan Opera under Fritz Reiner. It was in New York that Starker made the first of his recordings of the Bach Cello Suites.

In 1953, Starker became principal cellist of the Chicago Symphony Orchestra when Fritz Reiner became the music director. In 1958, Starker moved to Bloomington, Indiana, where he settled for the rest of his life. At the Indiana University Jacobs School of Music he became a professor and resumed his solo career. His students included Tsuyoshi Tsutsumi, Maria Kliegel, Emilio W. Colón and Gary Hoffman.

== Recorded repertoire ==
External audio
- You may hear Starker performing: Franz Joseph Haydn's Cello Concerto; Luigi Boccherini's Cello Concerto with Carlo Maria Giulini conducting the Philharmonia Orchestra in 1959; Here on archive.org

Starker made over 150 recordings. He recorded the Bach solo cello suites five times with at least two being released on Sefel Records, and most recently for RCA Victor Red Seal in 1997 for which he won a Grammy Award., He was also nominated for a Grammy Award for his 1989 recording of the works of David Popper. He had concerti written for him by David Baker, Antal Doráti, Bernhard Heiden, Jean Martinon, Miklós Rózsa, and Robert Starer. He twice recorded the Konzertstück for Cello and Orchestra by Ernő Dohnányi, the work he had played at age 13 with the composer: first, in 1956/57, with the Philharmonia Orchestra led by Walter Susskind, and the composer in attendance for all sessions (the composer was "angry" that the producer, Walter Legge, had insisted on cutting "the orchestra tutti at the start of part three" ); and second, without cuts, with the Seattle Symphony Orchestra led by Gerard Schwarz in 1990.

== Cellos ==
From 1950 to 1965, Starker played and recorded on the Lord Aylesford Stradivarius, the largest instrument made by Antonio Stradivarius. In 1965 Starker acquired a Matteo Goffriller cello believed to have been made in Venice in 1705; known previously as the "Ivor James Goffriller" cello, Starker renamed it for its certification as "The Star" cello.

== Reviews and published works ==
External audio
- You may hear Starker performing Beethoven's Concerto in C, Op. 56 For Piano, Violin, Cello, and Orchestra with Eliahu Inbal conducting the New Philharmonia Orchestra in 1970; Here on archive.org

Many documentaries, articles in magazines, and newspaper stories have acknowledged János Starker's virtuosity. He published numerous books and musical scores through Peer International, Schirmer, and Masters Music Publications. His autobiography, The World of Music According to Starker, was published in 2004 by Indiana University Press.

== Playing style ==
Starker's playing style was intense. According to some of his students, his technique revolved around long, legato notes, with very little shifting noise from his left hand, resulting in smooth, pure tones, "each note sounding like a jewel." Starker himself described his sound as "centered" and "focused." He was known for his ability to produce an extensive range of sounds and tone shading. He eschewed the wide vibrato favored by some of his peers—which he viewed as a cover for poor intonation—and was known for his patrician stage presence, preferring to let the music do the emoting. He quoted his long-time friend and colleague, György Sebők, who said, "Create excitement. Don't get excited."

== Personal habits ==
Starker was a lifelong smoker with a 60-cigarette-per-day habit. He also drank copious amounts of scotch whisky. He once refused to perform a concert in Columbia, South Carolina, that he was supposed to play because he was not allowed to smoke his "pre-concert cigarette" backstage.

== Bibliography ==
- János Starker: The World of Music According to Starker. Bloomington: Indiana University Press. 2022. ISBN 978-0-253-06539-1.
