= Karád =

Karád Karadin (in Croatian)
- Village
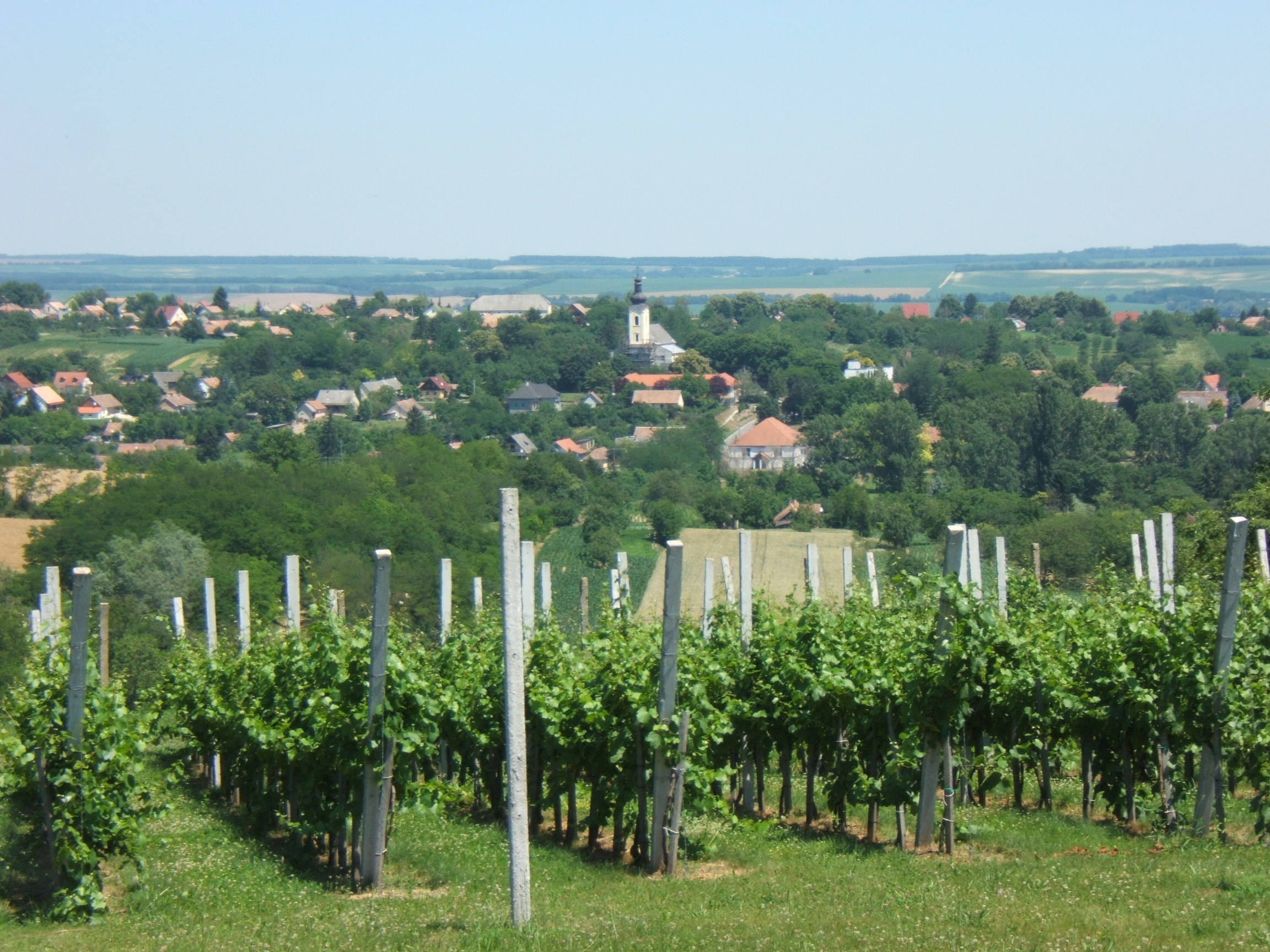
- View of the village from the vineyard hill

- Coat of arms

- Location of Somogy county in Hungary

- Location of Karád
- Coordinates: 46.69194°N 17.84329°E
- Country: Hungary
- Region: Southern Transdanubia
- County: Somogy
- District: Fonyód
- RC Diocese: Kaposvár

Area
  - Total: 52.38 km^{2} (20.22 sq mi)

Population (2017)
  - Total: 1,489
  - Density: 28.43/km^{2} (73.63/sq mi)
- Demonym: karádi
- Time zone: UTC+1 (CET)
  - Summer (DST): UTC+2 (CEST)
- Postal code: 8676
- Area code: (+36) 84
- Patron Saint: Ladislaus I
- NUTS 3 code: HU232
- MP: Mihály Witzmann (Fidesz)
- Website: Karád Online

Karád (Croatian: Karadin) is a village in Somogy county, Hungary.

The settlement is part of the Balatonboglár wine region.

== Etymology ==
Its name derives from the Turkish person name, Kara (Hungarian: fekete, English: black). He could be the first owner of the settlement. The same applies to Kára.

== History ==
According to László Szita the settlement was completely Hungarian in the 18th century.

== Culture ==
The Hungarian folk songs "Fót hátán fót, egy üngöm vót" (in 1938) and "A karádi faluvégen" (in 1933) were collected in Karád by Gyula Dávid as well as "Rén a bárány" (in 1953) by László Vikár.
