= Zeynep Üçbaşaran =

- Born: Istanbul, Turkey
- Genres: Classical
- Instrument: Piano
- Website: www.zupiano.com

Zeynep Üçbaşaran is a Turkish pianist.

== Biography ==
Pianist Zeynep Üçbaşaran was born in Istanbul, Turkey in 1968. She started her music studies at age four at the Istanbul Conservatory as one of the youngest ever to be admitted.

In 1987 Üçbaşaran started her studies in the Franz Liszt Academy of Music in Budapest, where she worked with Prof. Kornél Zempléni, Prof. Katalin Nemes (pupil of Béla Bartók), Balázs Kecskés, and Prof. István Lantos.

After obtaining her Teacher and Concert Artist Diploma in 1994, she continued her studies with Prof. Dr. Tibor Szász in Hochschule für Musik, Freiburg, Germany (University of Music Freiburg) and obtained her Diploma in Aufbaustudium I.

She has her advanced graduate degrees in Piano Performance from the University of Southern California, Los Angeles: MA (2000), Doctor of Musical Arts (2004).

Üçbaşaran has recorded the compositions of Franz Liszt, Wolfgang Amadeus Mozart, Ludwig van Beethoven, Domenico Scarlatti, Leonard Bernstein, Ahmet Adnan Saygun, and Robert Muczynski for Eroica Classical Recordings. Her samples can be downloaded from her website or listened to from her YouTube Channel: www.youtube.com/zupiano/

Since 1996 she has been living in Santa Barbara, California.

== Performances ==
Zeynep Üçbaşaran has given solo recitals and concerts in Turkey, Egypt, Hungary, England, Denmark, Sweden, Norway, Slovenia, Lithuania, and the United States in addition to several chamber music performances.

Her Wigmore Hall debut in London was in November 2004.

== Awards ==
Her awards include American Liszt Society Award, Rozsnyai Memorial Award, Ina Broida Award from UCSB, and USC Associates Music Merit Scholarship.

She is also a recipient of the MAA 2001 Aspen Summer Music Festival Scholarship, where she was selected to play in the distinguished artist Master Class of Leon Fleisher.

Üçbaşaran was a prize-winner in the 1996 and 2000 Los Angeles Liszt Competitions.

She was designated a "woman of distinction in the year 2003" by the Daughters of Atatürk organization in the US.

== Recordings ==
She has recorded for Eroica Classical Recordings

- Santa Barbara LISZT Album, 2001 (Eroica JDT3092)
- Virtuoso SCHUBERT, 2002 (Eroica JDT3108)
- LISZT / Sonata in B Minor, 2003 (Eroica JDT3135)
- Scarlatti / Beethoven / Saygun / Bernstein / Muczynski, 2005 (Eroica JDT3223)
- W.A. Mozart, 2005 (Eroica JDT3222) Piano Sonata No. 14 (Mozart)
- W.A. Mozart, 2007 (Eroica JDT3311)
- Ahmet Adnan Saygun, 2008 (Naxos 8.570746)
