= Dénes Gulyás =

Hungarian opera singer and politician

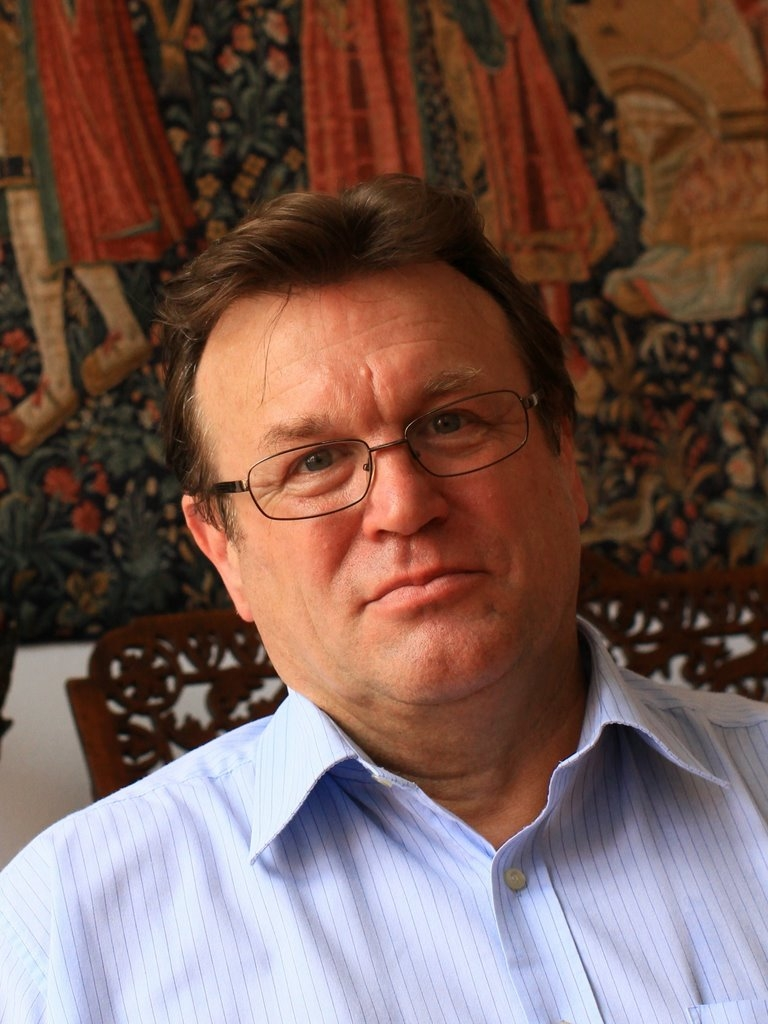

Member of the National Assembly
- In office 16 May 2006 – 5 May 2014

Personal details
- Born: 31 March 1954 (age 72) Budapest, Hungary
- Party: Fidesz (since 2003)
- Children: 3
- Profession: opera singer, politician

Dénes Gulyás (born 31 March 1954) is a Hungarian tenor. A native of Budapest, he studied at the Franz Liszt Academy of Music in that city. He had an international career in the 1970s, and sang at the Metropolitan Opera, among other houses; one of his performances there, a Manon in which he replaced Neil Shicoff as Des Grieux to the Manon of Catherine Malfitano, was broadcast live as part of the company's Saturday radio broadcast series.

He was also a member of Parliament, representing the Fidesz party, between 2006 and 2014.

== Life ==
He completed locksmith trade school. At age 19, he was admitted to the Music Academy, where in 1978 he was awarded diplomas in Opera Singing and Artistic Instructor. In 1979, he won two prizes in the Giovanni Cantanti Lirici competition, as well as in 1982 winning 1st prize in the first national Luciano Pavarotti vocal competition. He was a soloist at the Budapest Opera House as well as the Szeged National Theater, led the Gyor Kisfaludi Theater Opera Association, and as Musical Advisor to the National Theater, he revived the Chamber Music Series at the refectory.

Since 1995, he has been teaching voice at the Franz Liszt Academy of Music.

== Political career ==
Until 2003, he had no party affiliation. However, at the (then) Fidesz Congressional Convention, he joined the party. In 2004, he was nominated for Presidency of the Pest Valley 10th district (Pilisvörösvár) where in 2006 he won by a substantial margin. Since 30 March 2006 he had been a member of Parliament's Cultural and Media committees.

== Awards ==
- Franz Liszt Prize, 1982
- Artist of Merit of the Hungarian People's Republic, 1985
- Outstanding Artist of the Republic of Hungary, 2000
- Hungarian Heritage Award, 2014

== Personal life ==
Gulyás is married and has three children.
