= Leó Weiner =

Hungarian composer (1885–1960)

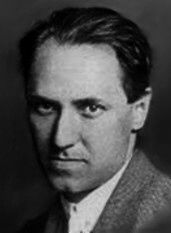
Leó Weiner

Leó Weiner (16 April 1885 – 13 September 1960) was one of the leading Hungarian music educators of the first half of the twentieth century, and a composer.

== Life ==
=== Education ===
Weiner was born in Budapest to a Jewish family. His brother gave him his first music and piano lessons. As children, he and Fritz Reiner played piano four hands.

Weiner later studied at the Academy of Music in Budapest, studying with János (Hans) Koessler. While there, he won numerous prizes, including the Franz Liszt Stipend, the Volkmann Prize and the Erkel Prize (all for one composition, his Serenade Op. 3); the Haynald Prize for his Agnus Dei; and the Schunda Prize for the Hungarian Fantasy for tárogató and cimbalom.

=== Teaching career ===
In 1908 he was appointed music theory teacher at the Budapest Academy of Music, professor of composition in 1912 and professor of chamber music in 1920. In 1949 he retired as emeritus professor, but continued to teach until the end of his life. Among his many notable students were conductors Antal Doráti, Peter Erős, Béla Síki, and Georg Solti; violinist Tibor Varga; cellists Edmund Kurtz and János Starker; and pianist György Sebők.

He died in Budapest. He was a two time recipient of the Kossuth Prize.

== Compositions ==
The early Romantics from Beethoven through Mendelssohn most strongly influenced Weiner's compositional style. His orchestration seems much indebted to later Romantic French composers not notably affected by Wagner, Bizet in particular. This conservative Romantic approach formed the basis of his style, to which elements of Hungarian folk music were added sometime later, although he was not an active field researcher of folk music as were his contemporaries Bartók and Kodály, but simply shared an interest in the subject and added elements of folk music into his established harmonic language without significantly changing it.

Among Weiner's notable compositions are a string trio, three string quartets, two violin sonatas, five divertimenti for orchestra, a symphonic poem, and numerous chamber and piano pieces.

On July 1, 2003, his Carnival Humoresque (Fasching), Op. 5, had its US premiere when it was performed at the Naumburg Orchestral Concerts, in the Naumburg Bandshell, Central Park, in the summer series.
