= Franz Liszt Academy of Music =

Concert hall and music conservatory in Budapest, Hungary

Coordinates: 47°30′11.69″N 19°3′52.26″E

- Liszt Ferenc Zeneművészeti Egyetem
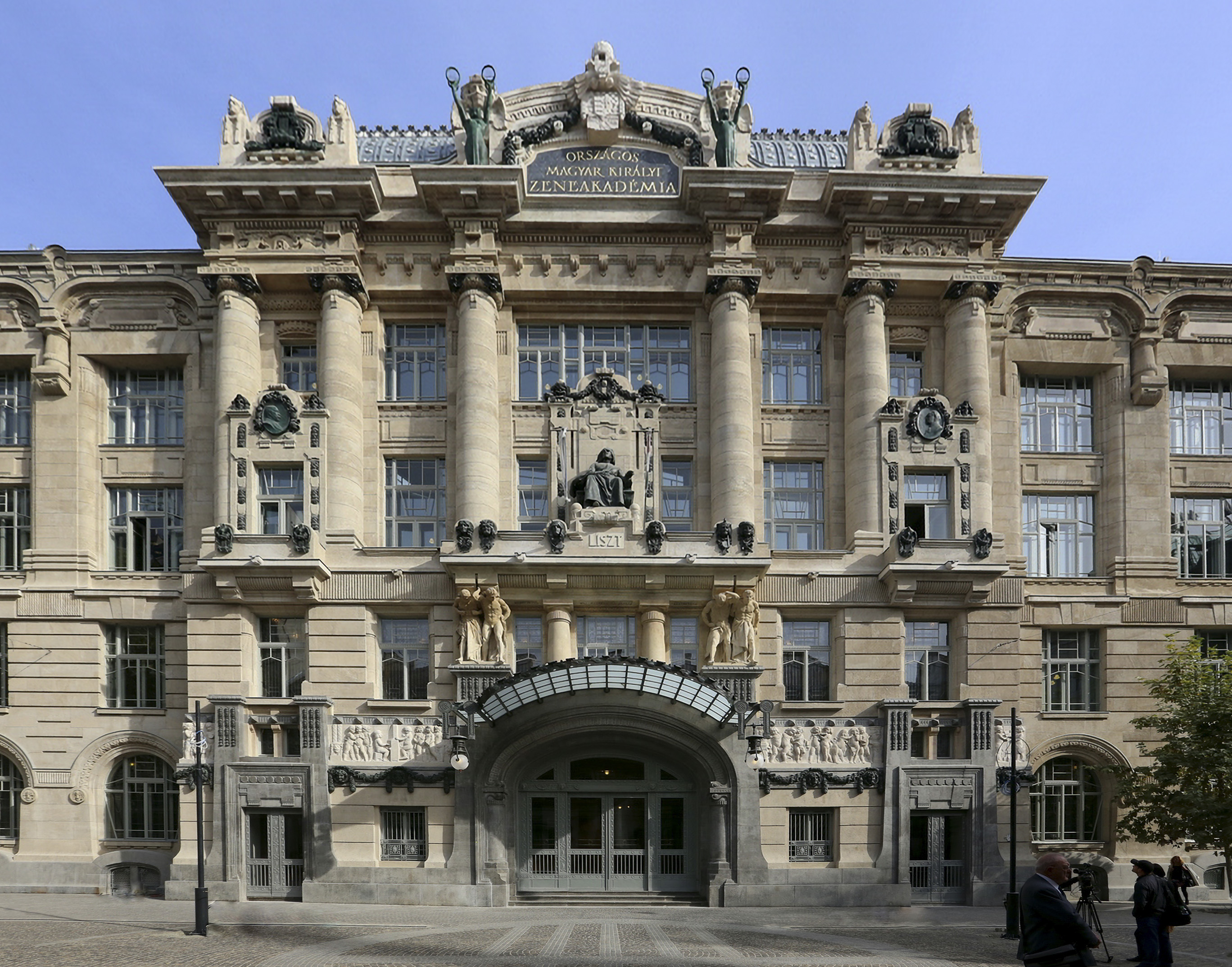
- The New Academy, facing Liszt Ferenc Square
- Type: Public
- Established: 1875
- Rector: Gábor Farkas
- Location: 8 Liszt Ferenc Square; Budapest, Hungary 1061
- Colours: Gold and light blue
- Website: zeneakademia.hu, lfze.hu

The Franz Liszt Academy of Music (Hungarian: Liszt Ferenc Zeneművészeti Egyetem, often abbreviated as Zeneakadémia, "Music Academy") is a music university and a concert hall in Budapest, Hungary, founded on 14 November 1875. It is home to the Liszt Collection, which features several valuable books and manuscripts donated by Franz Liszt upon his death, and the AVISO studio, a collaboration between the governments of Hungary and Japan to provide sound recording equipment and training for students. The Franz Liszt Academy of Music was founded by Franz Liszt himself (though named after its founder only in 1925, about 50 years after it was relocated to its current location at the heart of Budapest).

== Facilities ==
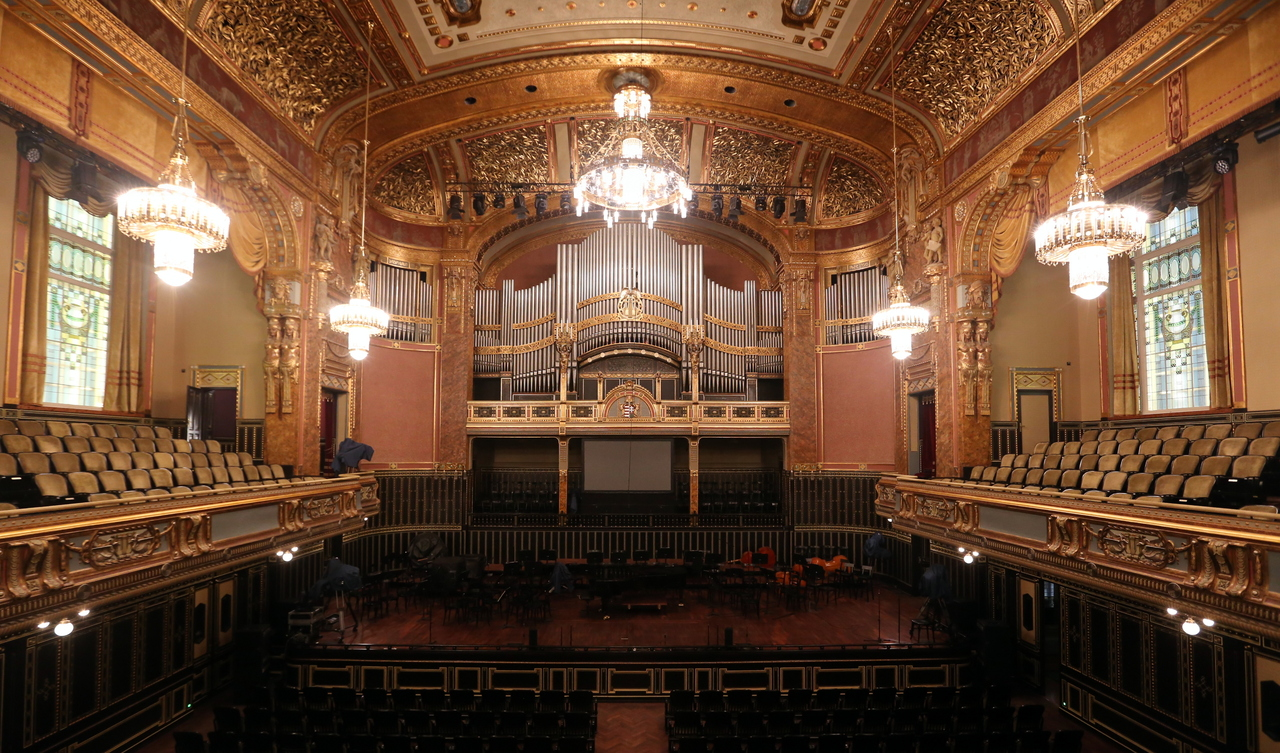
The Great Hall in 2013

The Academy was originally called the "Royal National Hungarian Academy of Music" and it was also called "College of Music" from 1919 to 1925. It was then named after its founder Franz Liszt in 1925. It was founded in Liszt's home, and relocated to a three-story Neo-Renaissance building designed by Adolf Láng and built on today's Andrássy Avenue between 1877 and 1879. That location is referred to as "Old Academy of Music" and commemorated by a 1934 plaque made by Zoltán Farkas. It was repurchased by the academy in the 1980s, and is now officially known as "Ferenc Liszt Memorial and Research Center."

Replacing the "Old Academy of Music", the Academy moved into a building erected in 1907 at the corner of Király Street and Liszt Ferenc square. It serves as a centre for higher education, music training, and concert hall. The Art Nouveau style building is one of the most well known in Budapest. It was designed by Flóris Korb and Kálmán Giergl at the request of Baron Gyula Wlassics, who was the Minister of Culture at that time. The façade is dominated by a statue of Liszt (sculpted by Alajos Stróbl). The inside of the building is decorated with frescoes, Zsolnay ceramics, and several statues (among them that of Béla Bartók and Frédéric Chopin). Originally the building also had stained glass windows, made by Miksa Róth.

Other facilities used by the Academy are the Budapest Teacher Training College, located in the former National Music School on Semmelweis Street, a secondary school (Bartók Béla Secondary School of Music, Instrument Making and Repair), and a student dormitory.

Ever since its foundation, the Academy has been the most prestigious music university operating in Hungary. A major development in its history was the recent establishment of a new, independent Folk Music Faculty. The Franz Liszt Academy of Music is as much a living monument to Hungary's continued musical life, as it is to the country's musical past. Its president (rector) is Andrea Vigh.

== Franz Liszt Museum (Budapest) ==
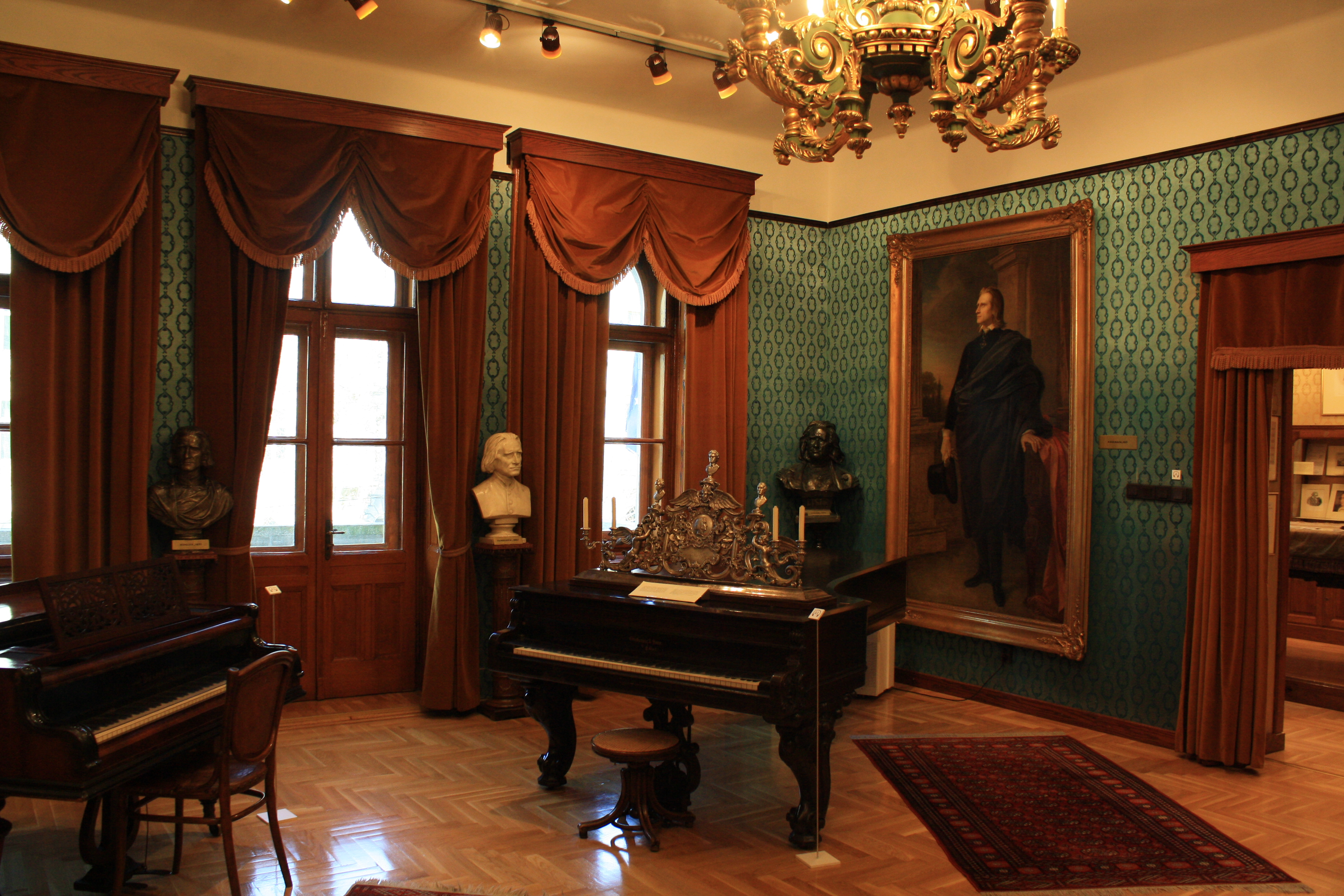
Inside the Franz Liszt Museum

The Franz Liszt Academy of Music hosts the Franz Liszt Museum, also called the Liszt Ferenc Memorial Museum, which shows three restored rooms of the home where Liszt lived at the end of his life, between January 1881 and April 1886. The museum is open to the public for HUF 3000, with alternate pricing for students, families, and children. From May 2023 to May 2024, the museum ran an exhibition "Liszt, the Teacher."

== Other names ==
- Liszt Ferenc Zeneművészeti Egyetem (2007–)
- Liszt Ferenc Zeneművészeti Főiskola egyetemi ranggal (2000–2007)
- Liszt Ferenc Zeneművészeti Főiskola (1925–2000)
- Országos Magyar Zeneművészeti Főiskola (1918–1925)
- Országos Magyar Királyi Zeneakadémia (1893–1918)
- Országos Magyar Királyi Zene- és Színművészeti Akadémia (1887–1893)
- Országos Magyar Királyi Zeneakadémia (1875–1887)

== Notable alumni ==
- Anneli Aarika-Szrok
- Márta Ábrahám
- Jenö Ádám
- Eak-tai Ahn
- Géza Anda
- Éva Andor
- Máté Balogh
- Gábor Bánát
- Laszlo Halasz
- György Bánhalmi
- Béla Bartók
- Munir Bashir
- Omar Bashir
- Sari Biró
- Gergely Bogányi
- Margit Bokor
- Csilla Boross
- Nicolae Bretan
- Charles Brunner
- Georges Cziffra
- Krisztián Cser
- Gábor Darvas
- José De Eusebio
- Ernő Dohnányi
- Antal Doráti
- Maria Dunszt
- Iván Erőd
- Peter Erős
- Ferenc Farkas
- Edith Farnadi
- András Fejér
- George Feyer
- Annie Fischer
- Andor Földes
- Peter Frankl
- János Fürst
- Zoltán Gárdonyi
- Zoltán Gáty
- Sylvia Geszty
- János Gonda
- Dénes Gulyás
- László Gyimesi
- Mária Gyurkovics
- Julia Hamari
- Kato Havas
- Erzsébet Házy
- Endre Hegedűs
- Frigyes Hidas
- Marta Hidy
- Jenő Hubay
- Jenő Huszka
- Sándor Jemnitz
- Zoltán Jeney
- Ilona Kabos
- Pál Kadosa
- Emmerich Kálmán
- László Kalmár
- Balint Karosi
- Bela Katona
- Egon Kenton
- István Kertész
- Edward Kilenyi
- Lajos Kiss
- Elisabeth Klein
- Zoltán Kocsis
- Zoltán Kodály
- Rezső Kókai
- Péter Komlós
- Gyula Kovács
- Tibor Kozma
- Lili Kraus
- Adrienne Krausz
- György Kurtág
- István Kuthy
- Magda László
- Sylvia Leidemann
- Vlastimil Lejsek
- András Ligeti
- György Ligeti
- Pál Lukács
- Edith Lorand
- Éva Marton
- Gwendolyn Masin
- Tibor Ney
- Gábor Ormai
- Eugene Ormandy
- Attila Pacsay
- Ditta Pásztory-Bartók
- Zoltán Peskó
- László Polgár
- David Popper
- B. Radó Lili
- Ferenc Rados
- Thomas Rajna
- Erno Rapee
- Charles Reiner
- Fritz Reiner
- József Réti
- Lívia Rév
- Anthony Ritchie
- Andrea Rost
- Ákos Rózmann
- Vera Rozsa
- Zoltán Rozsnyai
- György Sándor
- Szabolcs Sándor
- Sylvia Sass
- András Schiff
- Károly Schranz
- György Sebők
- Jenő Sevely
- Rane Shephard
- Béla Síki
- Georg Solti
- László Somogyi
- János Starker
- Rezső Sugár
- Enid Szánthó
- Zoltán Székely
- Eugen Szenkar
- Alex Szilasi
- András Szőllősy
- Charity Sunshine Tillemann-Dick
- Zeynep Üçbaşaran
- Gregory Vajda
- Tibor Varga
- Margit Varró
- Tamás Vásáry
- Balint Vazsonyi
- Gabriel von Wayditch
- László Weiner
- Leo Weiner
- Josef Weiss
- Wanda Wiłkomirska

== Notable faculty (past and present) ==
- Emil Ábrányi
- Dezső Antalffy-Zsiross
- Lajos Bárdos
- Béla Bartók
- Ernő Dohnányi
- Iván Erőd
- Ferenc Farkas
- Edith Farnadi
- Zoltán Gárdonyi
- Lájos Hernadi
- Jenő Hubay
- Jenő Jandó
- Pál Kadosa
- Zoltán Kodály
- Hans von Koessler
- Rezső Kókai
- Dénes Kovács
- Erzsébet Kozma
- György Kurtág
- Márta Kurtág
- Franz Liszt
- Pál Lukács
- Éva Marton
- David Popper
- Ferenc Rados
- József Réti
- Albert Simon
- Péter Solymos
- László Somogyi
- Arnold Székely
- Árpád Szendy
- Gusztáv Szerémi
- István Thomán
- Sándor Végh
- Sándor Veress
- János Viski
- Leo Weiner
- Ede Zathureczky

== See also ==
- List of concert halls
- Music of Budapest
