= Éva Andor =

Hungarian opera soprano singer

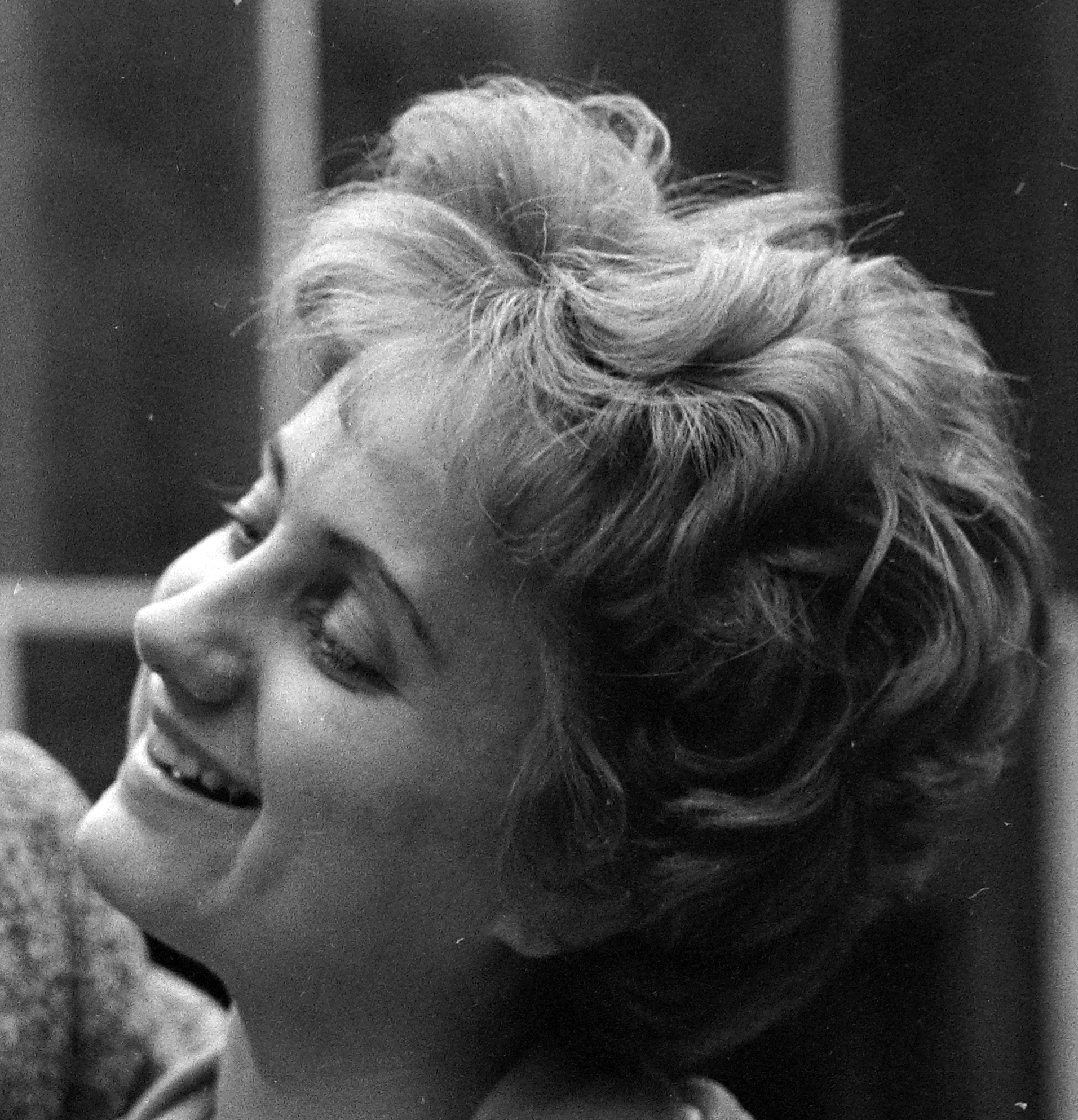
Éva Andor in 1961

Éva Andor (15 December 1939 – 16 May 2014) was a Hungarian opera soprano singer. She was a soloist at the Hungarian State Opera.

== Biography ==
Andor was born in Budapest, Hungary on 15 December 1939. She studied under Zoltán Kodály from a young age at the Franz Liszt Academy of Music, which she graduated from in 1964. She made her debut at the Hungarian State Opera House later in the same year as Barbarina in The Marriage of Figaro. She was a private singer at the Opera House where she played roles in operas written by composers such as Mozart, Verdi and Pucinni. She taught classes at the F. Liszt Academy of Music beginning in 1986. She was married to radio director Gyula Vadász until his death in 2010. Andor died in 2014 at the age of 74. In 2016, a singing competition was held posthumously in her honor at the F. Liszt Academy of Music, which repeats every two years.

== Awards ==
- Bartók–Pásztory Award (1992)
- Artisjus Award (1987)
- Szot award (1984)
- Meritorious Artist (1976)
- Mihály Székely memorial plaque (1971)
- Ferenc Liszt Award (1968)
