= Liszt Collection =

The Liszt Collection contains over one million generally nineteenth-century engravings and images. The Liszt Collection is an international project to preserve a portrayal of history through contemporary engravings, articles and books.

The Liszt Collection mainly covers Europe and the United States as well as other locations in the rest of the world, such as Canada, Australia, certain African countries, and South America and Asia.

The main areas of interest covered by the collection are history, society, art and culture. These areas are covered by showing geographical locations (towns, villages, counties and countries) as well as by showing various aspects of life in the nineteenth century. Ranging from topics such as politics, fashion in nineteenth-century France and social activities in the nineteenth-century German village to topics such as science, hiking in Switzerland, transport and coaches and trains crossing the country side.

In the mid-nineteenth-century wood engraving was used extensively for the speed and ease with which wood engravings could be produced. Engravings could be made within days of the event shown on the engraving. At this time very few (mainly American) painters could make a living selling their canvases and many turned to engraving to earn a living. Artists of the Liszt Collection’s engravings go from J. B. Allan, W. H. Bartlett and Thomas Bewick to R. Zogbaum.

== The Liszt Press ==
The Liszt Collection houses an abundance of information in images and text about the nineteenth century. The information will be made available in books through the Liszt Press. The imprint will have a large list of books, focused and specialized. Examples from the publishing list are; The Germans in Africa in 1884; Henry Landsdell, A Journey through Central Asia, around 1880; British advertisements from 1884; Major Cavagnari and the rebellion in Cabul, Afghanistan 1879; The restoration of Ely Cathedral in 1856; The Valparaíso and Santiago Railway in 1856; General Sir Colin Campbell, 1856; East Lancashire Railway, 1848; The French Republic’s Presidential Election in 1848; The Crimea in 1855, Bagtcheserai, The valley of Baidar and Woronzow Road; Visit of English Ships in 1855 to Japan, Comprising The Sybille, Hornet and Bittern.

== History ==
The Liszt collection’s roots lay in the Austro-Hungarian Empire, where Gizella Schwarz (1877–1962), started to collect some ‘Liszt’ prints. These were portraits of Franz Liszt and woodcuts of the places where he lived and worked. However, her interest quickly broadened and Gizella bought prints of a great variety of subjects. Amongst many others these include butterflies and flowers, engravings of Budapest and Hungary, but also London, Paris and New York.

On 15 October 1877, Károly Schwarz and Maria Habetler got a daughter, which they named Gizella. The baby was born in Körmend, Hungary, where Gizella spent her childhood. Károly Schwarz owned the well known Schwarz Coffee House and here it was that the young Gizella met many interesting people. Körmend being a frequented stop for travellers on their way from Hungary to Austria.

Gizella loved music and literature and spent her whole life reading. As family history has it, around 1880 in Budapest she even, as a little girl, met Franz Liszt, the famous nineteenth-century composer.

In 1939 she asked her birth certificate¹ from the Catholic Church in Körmend and by obtaining this certificate she saved herself from the concentration camps. The birth certificate is shown on the right and proves the validity of her origins being Roman Catholic. It is signed by the Vicar of Körmend which verifies the genuinity of the information. This is proven by his signature and stamp under the sentence: "That the certificate is in compliance with the original birth register of the Roman Catholic Church, and that I further strengthen this proof with my signature and official stamp." As it can be seen a red satisfactory tick has later been added, presumably by a German officer, to certify that her origins were indeed 'lawful'.

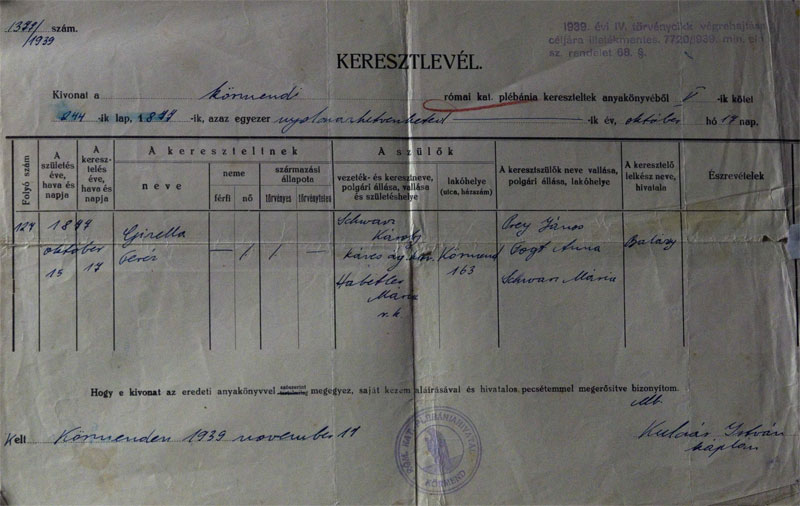
The birth certificate that saved Gizella Schwarz from the concentration camps

In 1957, Gizella was portrayed by Janos Szikra, at the age of 80, 4 years before her death.

Over the past hundred years the Liszt collection was gradually expanded and now houses over one million nineteenth-century engravings, prints and images and over two million articles.

Gizella used this suitcase to keep her first prints in

== The Liszt Collection and image libraries ==
For The Liszt Collection, a diversity of image libraries offer access to its collection online. The Liszt Collection aims to increase cultural awareness by the publication of the assets (image and text) as identifiable electronic publications, registered with a DOI (Digital Object Identifier) for permanent referencing and linking.

== Notes ==
1. Rom. Kat. Plébániahivatal Körmend, archive number: 1377/1939, November 11, 1939
2. Zádor, A. & Genthon, I. (1984) Művészeti Lexikon. Akadémiai Kiadó ISBN 963-05-2360-4
