= Zoltán Gáty =

Hungarian music teacher and conductor

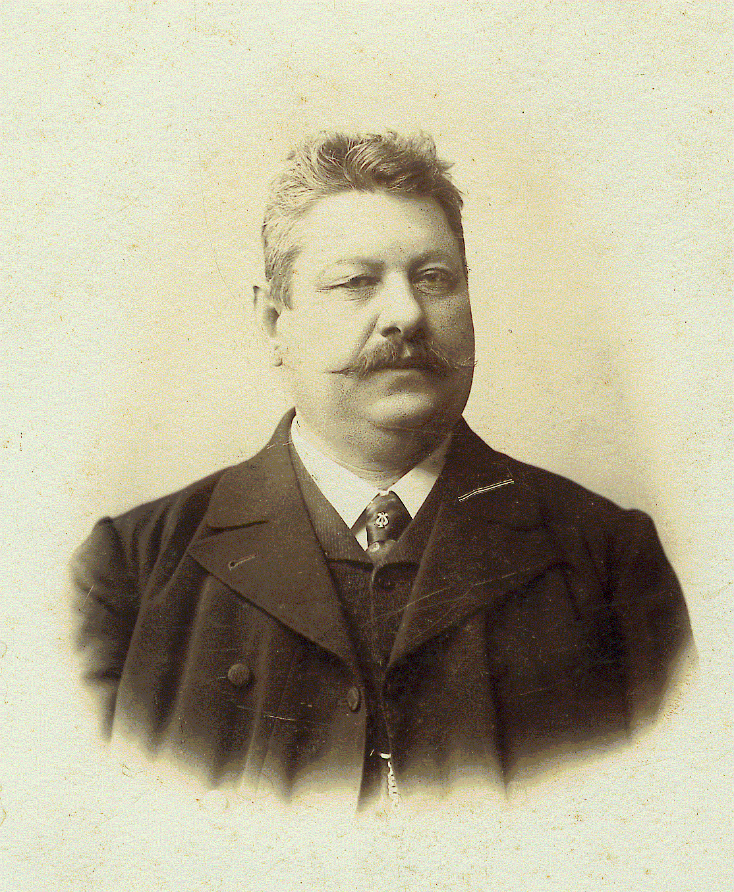
- Gáty, c. 1900
- Born: 5 March 1856; Ajka, Hungary
- Died: 17 July 1928 (aged 72); Pápa, Hungary
- Occupations: Composer; Conductor; Music pedagogue

Zoltán Gáty (a.k.a. Gáti, Gáthy Gáthy) (Ajka, 5 March 1856 - Pápa, 17 July 1928) was a Hungarian music teacher, conductor, and composer.

== Biography ==
Zoltán Gáty attended a primary school in his hometown, while playing the violin. He went on to study at the Pápa high school in Calvin. From 1874 he studied philosophy in Budapest, interrupted by the military years (1877-1879). He later attended a year of music school, and later obtained a diploma from Ferenc Liszt University of Music in the Royal Hungarian Academy of Music in 1884. His most important teachers were Sándor Nikolits and Ferenc Erkel. After graduation he taught in music school, from 1890 in the Calvinist Teacher Training College at Pápa, from 1909 in the Calvinist [...] institute. He was also a choral conductor, and a leading figure of Pápa's musical life. He retired in 1926. He and his wife had several children.

Gáty was the subject of a biography by the conductor and composer Adrián Horváth published in 2015.

== Selected compositions ==
- Magyar nyitány (1884, for full symphony orchestra)
- Álmaimban gyakran (1884, by poem by Sándor Petőfi
- Magyar ünnepi nyitány (1900, for 2 pianos)
- Csonka honvéd (1903, by a poem by János Arany)
- Psalm (1915, for women's chorus)
- Andante (1918, for violins)
- Prayer (1922, for female choir, 3 violins, piano)
