= Maria Dunszt =

Operatic soprano (1936–1994)

Maria Dunszt von Adelsheim
- Born: Dunszt Mária; 10 October 1936; Budapest, Hungary
- Died: 24 August 1994 (aged 57); Budapest, Hungary
- Citizenship: Hungarian
- Occupation: Operatic soprano
- Relatives: Erika Eva Dunst (sister)

Maria Dunszt, also known and credited as Maria Dunst (10 October 1936 – 24 August 1994), was a Hungarian operatic soprano and one of the most renowned and influential opera singers of the 20th century. She gained international recognition in 1965 following a highly acclaimed guest appearance in Gelsenkirchen.

== Early life ==
Dunszt was born on 10 October 1936, in Budapest, Hungary. Her mother, Mária Pálffy, was an opera and oratorio singer, while her father played in the telephone factory orchestra, even after his retirement. Dunszt began studying piano at the age of five.

Dunszt studied at the Franz Liszt Academy of Music in Budapest from 1955 to 1961 under the tutelage of Imre Molnár and Oszkár Maleczky. At the academy, she won first prize at the 1960 Erkel Singing Competition, and the grand prize at the Toulouse Singing Competition.

In 1961, she was engaged by the Hungarian State Opera House, where she would go on to perform numerous leading roles.

== Career ==
Throughout her career, Dunszt became a celebrated dramatic soprano, performing a broad repertoire that included leading roles in operas by Verdi, Wagner, Rossini, and Gounod.

Among her notable roles were Violetta in La traviata, Desdemona in Otello, the title role in Aida, Leonora in Il trovatore, Marguerite in Gounod's Faust, and Matilda in Rossini's William Tell. She also gained recognition for portraying Wagnerian heroines such as Eva in Die Meistersinger von Nürnberg, Elisabeth in Tannhäuser, Elsa in Lohengrin, Sieglinde in Die Walküre, and Gutrune in Götterdämmerung. In 1962 she portrayed Melinda in Erkel's Bánk bán.

Dunszt also recorded two albums: Santuzza in Cavalleria rusticana (1964) and the Wife in C'est la guerre by Emil Petrovics. She was also known for her performances as a soloist in oratorios.

== Family ==
Dunszt's mother, Mária Pálffy (1903–1981), was also an opera singer. Her father, László Dunst (1893–1975), was a private-sector official and the director of United Incandescent Lamp and Electrical Co. (Egyesült Izzó).

From her father's previous marriage to Mária Novák, the sister of painter Vilmos Aba-Novák, Dunszt had a half-sister, Erika Eva Dunst (1927–1981). Erika emigrated to the United States in 1947, when Mária was eleven years old, and the two therefore never met in person.

== Personal life and legacy ==
Dunszt's career ended after a severe car accident in 1976, which left her unable to perform in public. She died on 24 August 1994 at the age of 57.

Dunszt is remembered as one of Hungary's top operatic talents of the 20th century.
