= Dunst (performance group) =

Queer performance group in Copenhagen, Denmark

Dunst is a queer performance art and activist group in Copenhagen, Denmark. The group began in 2001 as an informal network, but since 2004 it formally works as an association. Among its projects are art shows, dinner nights, performances, film nights, parties and political manifestations, as well as TV and radio shows. The name means odour or reek in Danish.

== Activities ==
During 2003, Dunst handled the Gay House at Christiania. Events and parties in the revived Gay House were popular among Copenhagen's gays, but Dunst allegedly received complaints and threats from Christiania residents and subsequently moved out of Christiania.

== Style and context ==
Dunst is known for its bizarre and ironic drag queen personalities (including such names as Ramona Macho, Miss Fish, Puta and Tove Hansen) and music performers such as the band Nuclear Family. Having decidedly anti-establishment aims, the group has a humorous approach with a drag-punk flavour. Public appearances have been referred in several mainstream media which would otherwise often ignore gay events.

The attitude of Dunst appears more sarcastic and less militant than radical queer punk formations in other countries. It could be claimed that Dunst combines a postmodern appearance with a Danish tradition of humorous political activism. During the 1970s and 1980s, the theatre group Solvognen (Sun Chariot, linked with Christiania), singers Troels Trier and Rebecca Brüel, and the squatter performance network Kulørte Klat ("Coloured Blob") made imaginative and ironic performances, as well as feminist groups of rødstrømper (literally "Redstockings").

== Manifesto ==
The Dunst website proclaims its "Manifesto" as follows:

1. dunst is for all the cute ones.

2. dunst is the culture bearing layer of our gender political confusement.

3. dunst has provocation as a work tool and not as a goal in itself.

4. dunst makes contrasts strong.

5. dunst is for all who in a self performance will go beyond their own modesty.

6. dunst is the low life that others won't have an opinion about.

7. dunst is the sanctuary for those who come from a male or female chauvinist upbringing.

8. dunst crosses the gender specific habits and limits you keep in your everyday life.

9. dunst is for those who think they and others should be culturally carpet bombed.

10. dunst is always in change.
