= Szabolcs Sándor =

Hungarian conductor and pianist (born 1973)

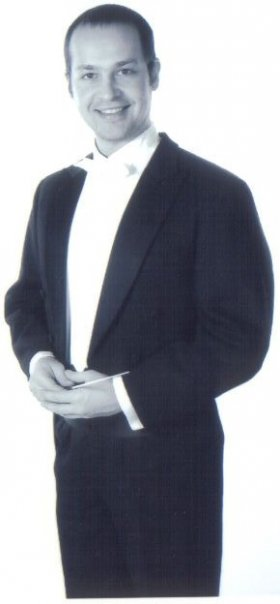

Background information
- Born: March 30, 1973 (age 53); Budapest, Hungary
- Occupations: conductor, accompanist, pianist

Szabolcs Sándor (born Budapest, March 30, 1973) is a Hungarian conductor and pianist.

== Studies ==
Sándor began to play the piano at the age of five. His first appearance was at the age of seven in Budapest later on the domestic stages and international ones, too. In 1991 he left the Béla Bartók Conservatory as a pupil of Katalin Schweitzer. In 1996 he qualified as a pianist at Franz Liszt Academy of Music, Summa con laude, his professor was Dénes Várjon. Later on after having qualified as a chamber musician he continued his studies attending the faculty of solo-repetitor. After having concentrated school-years he graduated in 1998 in the Grand Hall of Music Academy in Budapest. His professors were, among the others, Emmy Varasdy, Josef Patko, Gyorgy Vashegyi, Laszlo Tihanyi, Josef Sári.

In 2007 graduated as a conductor at Accademia Musicale Pescarese in the class of Donato Renzetti. He was an active participant in different master courses, namely with Yuri Simonov, Zoltán Peskó, Daniele Gatti, Aldo Ceccato, Dario Lucantoni.

From 2014 he has been a doctoral student at the Music Academy in Budapest.

== Works ==
From 1996 to 1999 he was an assistant lecturer with Sylvia Sass at MusicAcademy. He turned his focus to conducting career for her proposal. In 1998 he was engaged at Hungarian State Opera as a solo-repetitor by the invitation of Josef Patko, former head of department, having started work with Ligeti's Le Grand Macabre as the musical leader. 1991–2001 he taught chamber music furthermore was being as a repetitor in all faculties of the orchestral instruments at Bela Bartok Conservatory and St.Stephan Conservatory. 2000 Miklós Szinetár, ex-intendant of the Hungarian Opera, appointed him to the musical leader of OperaStudio. Between 2001–2006 he prepared some opera-projects many times in Peking (Turandot, La Boheme, Aida) by invitation of Andras Kurthy and Tibor Rudas, who was the producer of The three tenors. In 2001 he was appointed to the director of choir of The Hungarian State Opera, then he worked there as a conductor too. In 2006 he established the OperaViva Orchestra and the Rotary Hungary Orchestra.

Between 2008–2011 he was a professor at the faculty of singing at University of Szeged, later on has been a professor of the OperaMaster at Liszt Ferenc Academy of Music by the invitation of Eva Marton. In 2010 and 2011 he was the assistant conductor in the Bartok Festival of Szombathely. By the invitation of the Philharmony he conducted the MAV Symphony Orchestra in the series of concerts titled 'Young talents', then conducted the Savaria Symphony Orchestra in the series titled 'Music of our age'. In January 2010 he conducted the concert of the New Year in Catania. In 2011 he conducted the Der Zigeunerprimas of Emmerich Kalman in the series of an Operettenturnée performed in Switzerland and in Germany. In April 2011 he conducted the Failoni Orchestra in 21 cities of Mexico performing 24 concerts. In 2011 he gave a concert for memory of Franz Liszt at Embassy of Hungary in Wien. Since 2014 he has been the conductor of the Hungaroperett Company and during that year conducted an Operett Revue turnée consisting of 16 performances.

== Prizes ==
- In 2006 he won the third prize at International Opera-conductor Competition in Orvieto performed Puccini's La Bohéme.
- In 2008 he was rewarded with Laszlo Pless's prize by The Hungarian State Opera.
