= John Gaty =

American Mechanical Engineer

John P. Gaty (died 1963) was an American Mechanical Engineer, General Manager of the Beech Aviation Company in Wichita Kansas, and alumnus of Cornell University, graduating in 1923 who was best known for his will, which gave 1,300,000 dollars to various conservative causes.

I request that in making such distribution my Trustees give special consideration to the purposes which will promote individual liberty and incentive as opposed to socialism and communism.

Under the terms of the will, his trustees were required to meet yearly in Wichita, and were each given 10,000 dollars to contribute from 1967 until 1977.

== List of Trustees ==
- Barry Goldwater
- John Tower
- Strom Thurmond
- Clarence Manion
- Frank Lausche
- George Benson
- Edgar Eisenhower
- Louis Nichols
- William F. Buckley
