= Adolf Lang =

Hungarian architect

Adolf Láng
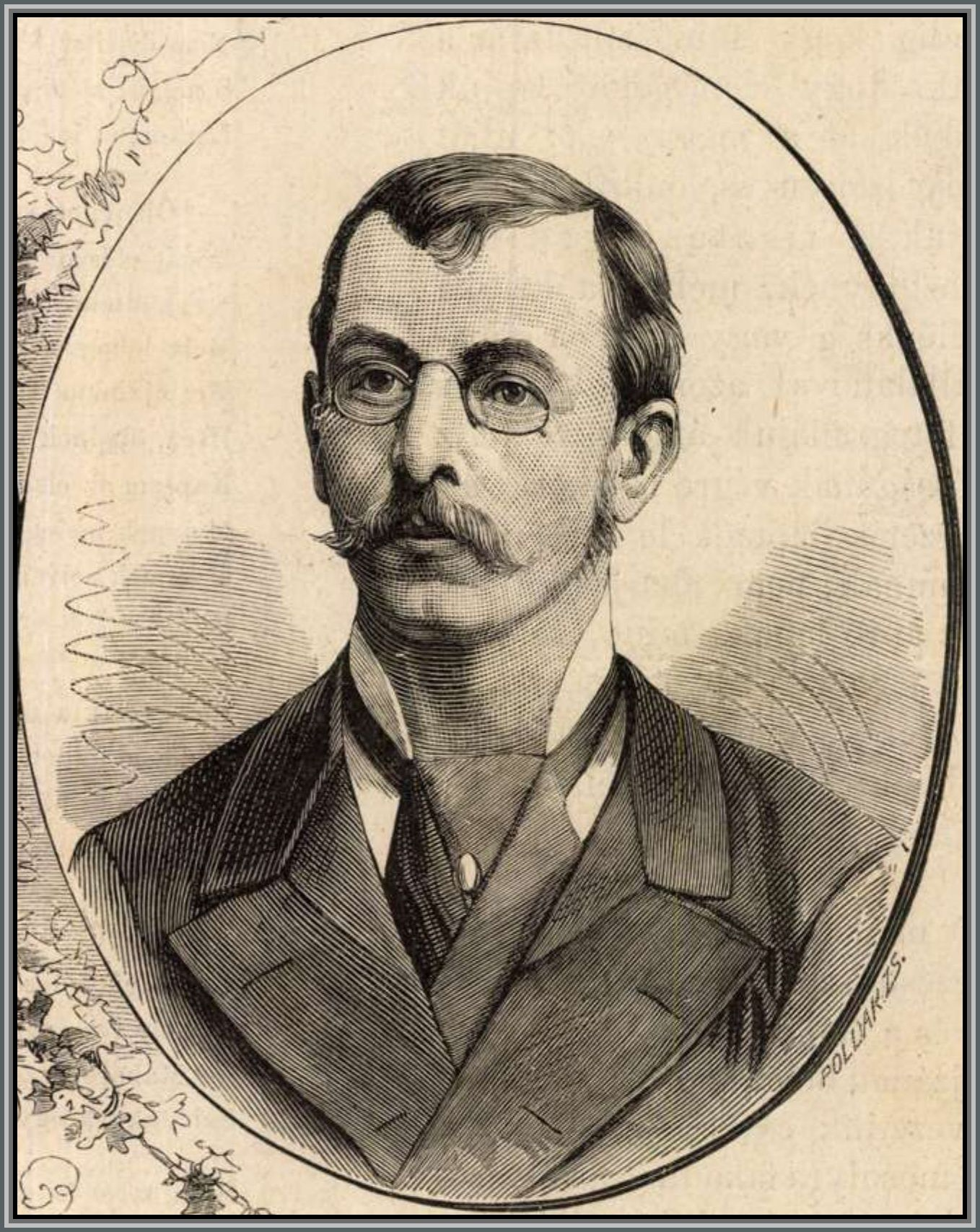
- Adolf Láng
- Born: 15 June 1848; Prague, Habsburg Empire
- Died: 2 May 1913; Budapest, Austria-Hungary
- Citizenship: Hungarian
- Education: TU Wien, Vienna
- Occupation: Architect

Adolf Láng (15 June 1848 – 2 May 1913), was a Hungarian architect.

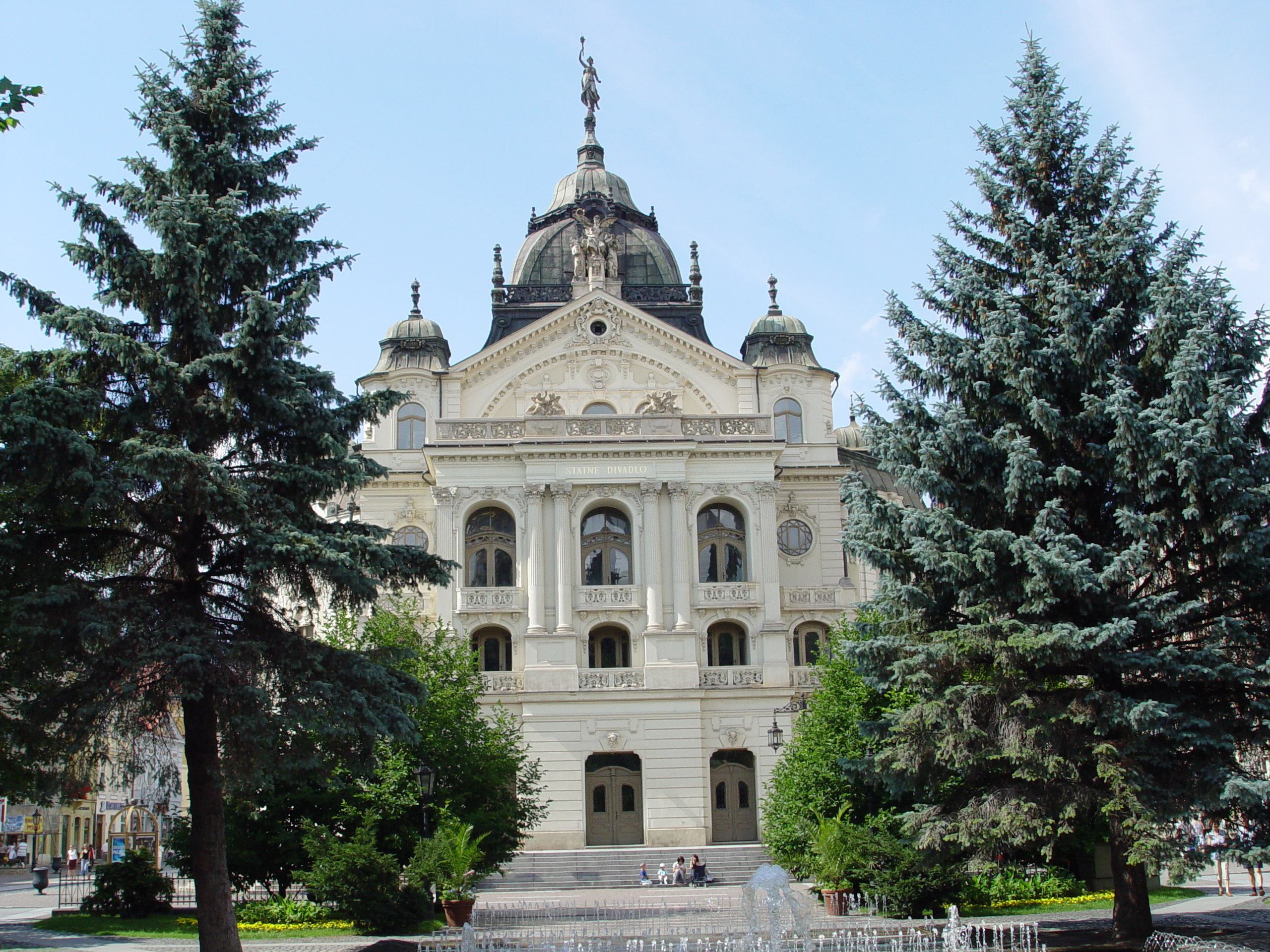
Košice State Theater

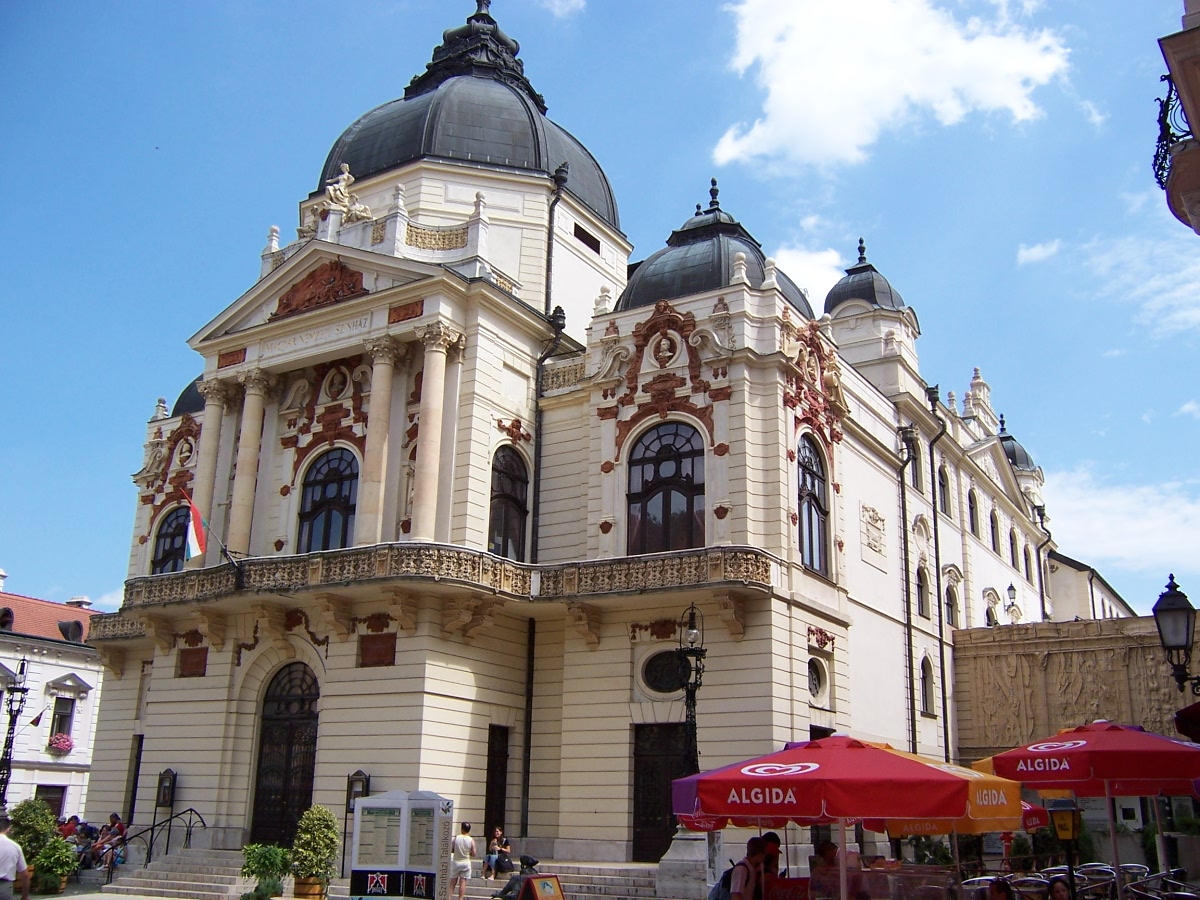
Pécs National Theatre

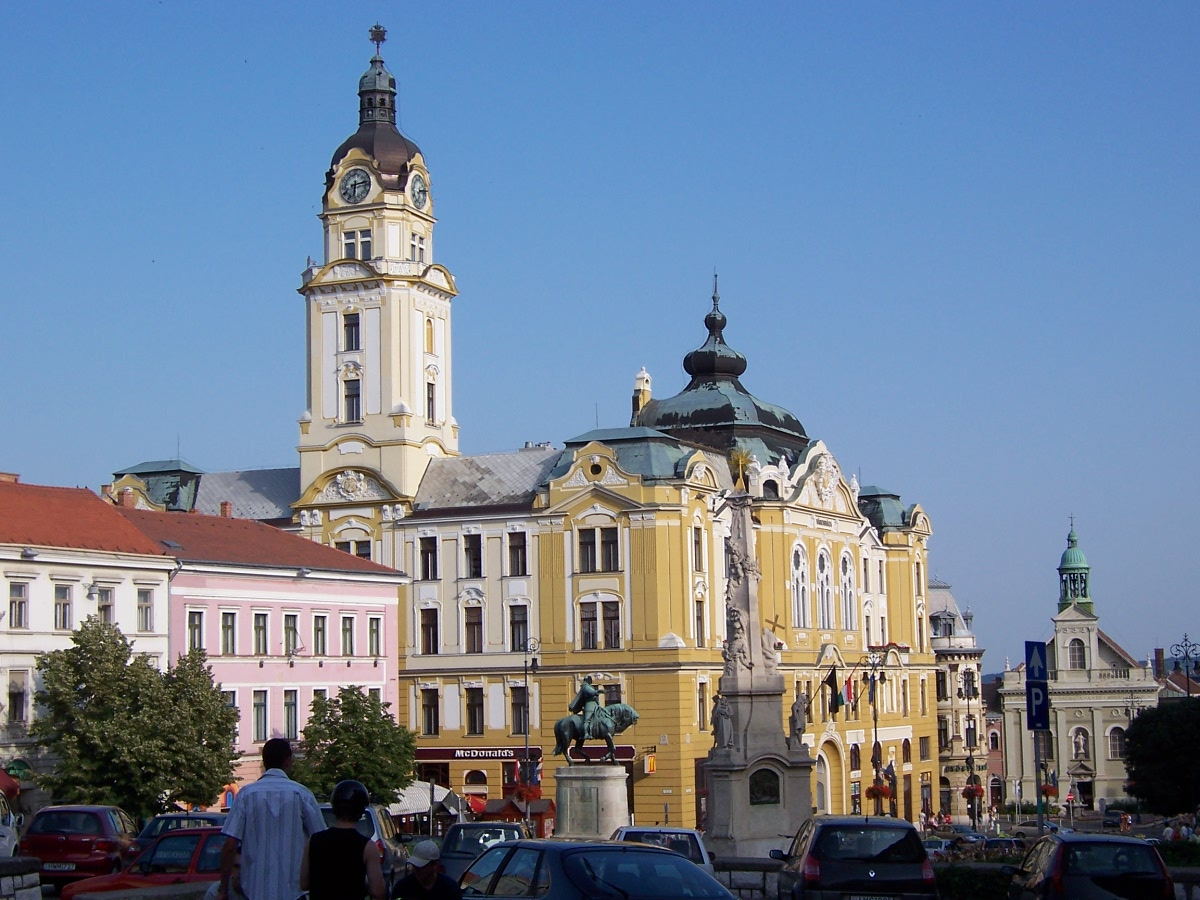
Pécs City Hall
