= Hans von Koessler =

German composer, conductor and music teacher (1853–1926)

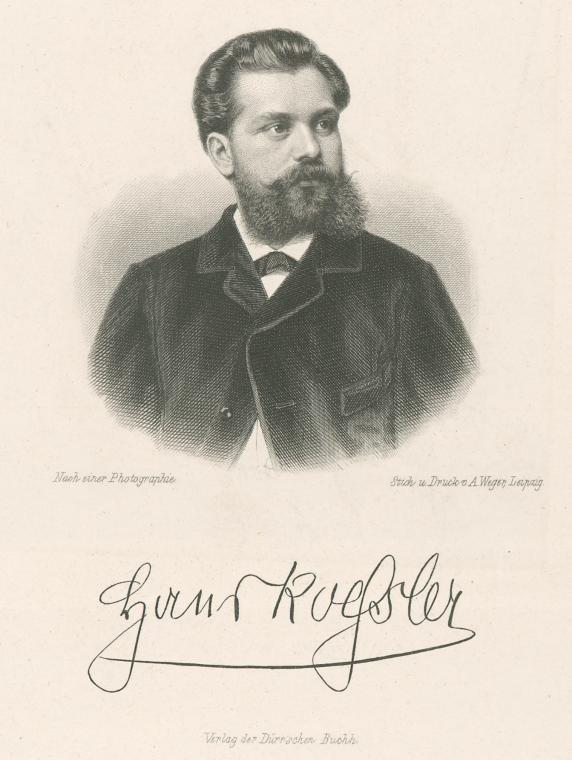

Hans von Koessler (1 January 1853 – 23 May 1926) was a German composer, conductor and music teacher. In Hungary, where he worked for 26 years, he was known as János Koessler.

== Biography ==
Koessler, a cousin of Max Reger, was born in Waldeck, Fichtelgebirge (now part of Kemnath, Upper Palatinate). He was taught the organ from 1874 to 1877 by Josef Rheinberger and attended the choir lessons of Franz Wüllner in Munich. Immediately after that, he moved to Dresden, where he was appointed director and teacher for music theory and choral music at the Dresden School of Music. From 1878, he was also conductor of the Dresdner Liedertafel orchestra. From 1882 to 1908, he initially taught organ and choir at the National Music Academy of Budapest in Hungary. Later, he also became professor for composition and was also given a peerage.

His students became some of the best Hungarian composers of the time: Zoltán Kodály, Béla Bartók, Ernő Dohnányi; for more See: List of music students by teacher: K to M#Hans von Koessler. After his retirement in 1908, he returned to Germany, but became appointed to the agency of Kálmán and Dohnányi in order to ensure that he received a moderate income.

He died in Ansbach in 1926, aged 73.

== Music ==
Koessler composed over 130 works, including an opera, two symphonies, symphonic variations for orchestra, a violin concerto, two string quartets, a string quintet, a string sextet, a piano quintet, a suite for piano, violin and viola, and a mass for female choir and organ. He also set psalms to music. However, as a result of his erratic way of living, a large number of his compositions were lost, or found themselves only being played in private hands.

Koessler's chamber music has been highly praised by several commentators, including the eminent chamber music scholar Wilhelm Altmann, who has singled out Koessler's Second String Quartet and his Trio Suite for Piano, Violin and Viola for especial praise.

== Bibliography ==
- Cobbett's Cyclopedic Survey of Chamber Music (London: Oxford University Press, 1963)
- Wilhelm Altmann: Handbuch für Streichquartettspieler (Wilhelmshaven: Heinrichshofen, 1972)
- The New Grove Dictionary of Music & Musicians (London: Macmillan, 1980)
