= Expressionist music =

Movement in Western music

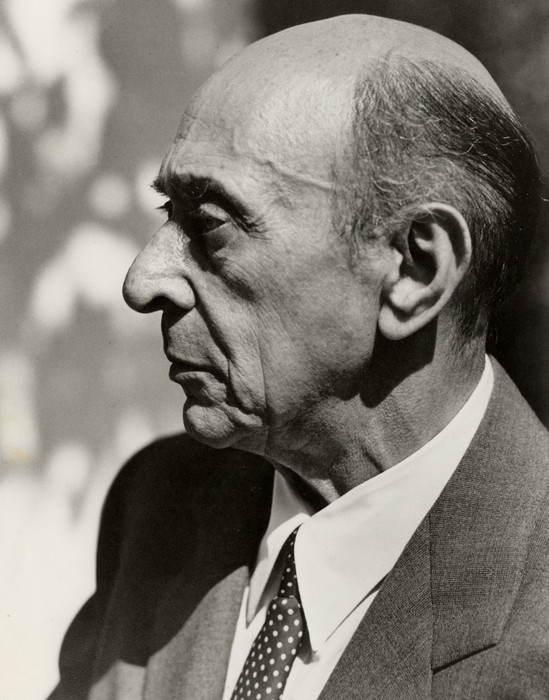
Arnold Schoenberg, the key figure in the expressionist movement

The term expressionism was probably first applied to music in 1918, especially to Schoenberg", because like the painter Wassily Kandinsky (1866–1944) he avoided "traditional forms of beauty" to convey powerful feelings in his music. Theodor Adorno interprets the expressionist movement in music as seeking to "eliminate all of traditional music's conventional elements, everything formulaically rigid". This he sees as analogous "to the literary ideal of the 'scream.' " As well Adorno sees expressionist music as seeking "the truthfulness of subjective feeling without illusions, disguises or euphemisms". Adorno also describes it as concerned with the unconscious, and states that "the depiction of fear lies at the centre" of expressionist music, with dissonance predominating, so that the "harmonious, affirmative element of art is banished". Expressionist music would "thus reject the depictive, sensual qualities that had come to be associated with impressionist music. It would endeavor instead to realize its own purely musical nature—in part by disregarding compositional conventions that placed 'outer' restrictions on the expression of 'inner' visions".

Expressionist music often features a high level of dissonance, extreme contrasts of dynamics, constant changing of textures, "distorted" melodies and harmonies, and angular melodies with wide leaps.

== Major figures ==
The three central figures of musical expressionism are Arnold Schoenberg (1874–1951) and his pupils, Anton Webern (1883–1945) and Alban Berg (1885–1935), the so-called Second Viennese School. Other composers that have been associated with expressionism are Ernst Krenek (1900–1991) (the Second Symphony, 1922), Paul Hindemith (1895–1963) (Die junge Magd, Op. 23b, 1922, setting six poems of Georg Trakl), Igor Stravinsky (1882–1971) (Three Japanese Lyrics, 1913), Alexander Scriabin (1872–1915) (late piano sonatas). Another significant expressionist was Béla Bartók (1881–1945) in early works, written in the second decade of the 20th century, such as Bluebeard's Castle (1911), The Wooden Prince (1917), and The Miraculous Mandarin (1919). American composers with a sympathetic "urge for such intensification of expression" who were active in the same period as Schoenberg's expressionist free atonal compositions (between 1908 and 1921) include Carl Ruggles, Dane Rudhyar, and, "to a certain extent", Charles Ives, whose song "Walt Whitman" is a particularly clear example. Important precursors of expressionism are Richard Wagner (1813–1883), Gustav Mahler (1860–1911), and Richard Strauss (1864–1949).Mitchell 2005, 334 Later composers, such as Peter Maxwell Davies (1934–2016), "have sometimes been seen as perpetuating the Expressionism of Schoenberg, Berg, and Webern", and Heinz Holliger's (b. 1939) most distinctive trait "is an intensely engaged evocation of ... the essentially lyric expressionism found in Schoenberg, Berg and, especially, Webern".

== Arnold Schoenberg ==
Musical expressionism is closely associated with the music Arnold Schoenberg composed between 1908 and 1921, which is his period of "free atonal" composition, before he devised twelve-tone technique. Compositions from the same period with similar traits, particularly works by his pupils Alban Berg and Anton Webern, are often also included under this rubric, and the term has also been used pejoratively by musical journalists to describe any music in which the composer's attempts at personal expression overcome coherence or are merely used in opposition to traditional forms and practices. It can therefore be said to begin with Schoenberg's Second String Quartet (written 1907–08) in which each of the four movements gets progressively less tonal. The third movement is arguably atonal and the introduction to the final movement is very chromatic, arguably has no tonal centre, and features a soprano singing "Ich fühle Luft von anderem Planeten" ("I feel the air of another planet"), taken from a poem by Stefan George. This may be representative of Schoenberg entering the "new world" of atonality.

In 1909, Schoenberg composed the one-act 'monodrama' Erwartung (Expectation). This is a thirty-minute, highly expressionist work in which atonal music accompanies a musical drama centered around a nameless woman. Having stumbled through a disturbing forest, trying to find her lover, she reaches open countryside. She stumbles across the corpse of her lover near the house of another woman, and from that point on the drama is purely psychological: the woman denies what she sees and then worries that it was she who killed him. The plot is entirely played out from the subjective point of view of the woman, and her emotional distress is reflected in the music. The author of the libretto, Marie Pappenheim, was a recently graduated medical student familiar with Freud's newly developed theories of psychoanalysis, as was Schoenberg himself.

In 1909, Schoenberg completed the Five Pieces for Orchestra. These were constructed freely, based upon the subconscious will, unmediated by the conscious, anticipating the main shared ideal of the composer's relationship with the painter Wassily Kandinsky. As such, the works attempt to avoid a recognisable form, although the extent to which they achieve this is debatable.

Between 1908 and 1913, Schoenberg was also working on a musical drama, Die glückliche Hand. The music is again atonal. The plot begins with an unnamed man, cowered in the centre of the stage with a beast upon his back. The man's wife has left him for another man; he is in anguish. She attempts to return to him, but in his pain he does not see her. Then, to prove himself, the man goes to a forge, and in a strangely Wagnerian scene (although not musically), forges a masterpiece, even with the other blacksmiths showing aggression towards him. The woman returns, and the man implores her to stay with him, but she kicks a rock upon him, and the final image of the act is of the man once again cowered with the beast upon his back.

This plot is highly symbolic, written as it was by Schoenberg himself, at around the time when his wife had left him for a short while for the painter Richard Gerstl. Although she had returned by the time Schoenberg began the work, their relationship was far from easy. The central forging scene is seen as representative of Schoenberg's disappointment at the negative popular reaction to his works. His desire was to create a masterpiece, as the protagonist does. Once again, Schoenberg is expressing his real life difficulties.

In around 1911, the painter Wassily Kandinsky wrote a letter to Schoenberg, which initiated a long lasting friendship and working relationship. The two artists shared a similar viewpoint, that art should express the subconscious (the "inner necessity") unfettered by the conscious. Kandinsky's Concerning The Spiritual In Art (1914) expounds this view. The two exchanged their own paintings with each other, and Schoenberg contributed articles to Kandinsky's publication Der Blaue Reiter. This inter-disciplinary relationship is perhaps the most important relationship in musical expressionism, other than that between the members of the Second Viennese School. The inter-disciplinary nature of expressionism found an outlet in Schoenberg's paintings, encouraged by Kandinsky. An example is the self-portrait Red Gaze (see Archived link), in which the red eyes are the window to Schoenberg's subconscious.

== Anton Webern and Alban Berg ==
Anton Webern's music was close in style to Schoenberg's expressionism, c. 1909–13, and subsequently his music "became increasingly constructivist on the surface and increasingly concealed its passionate expressive core". His Five Pieces for Orchestra, Op. 10 (1911–13) are from this period.

Alban Berg's contribution includes his Op. 1 Piano Sonata, and the Four Songs of Op. 2. His major contribution to musical expressionism, however, were very late examples, the operas Wozzeck, composed between 1914 and 1925, and unfinished Lulu. Wozzeck is highly expressionist in subject material in that it expresses mental anguish and suffering and is not objective, presented, as it is, largely from Wozzeck's point of view, but it presents this expressionism within a cleverly constructed form. The opera is divided into three acts, the first of which serves as an exposition of characters. The second develops the plot, while the third is a series of musical variations (upon a rhythm, or a key for example). Berg unashamedly uses sonata form in one scene in the second act, describing himself how the first subject represents Marie (Wozzeck's mistress), while the second subject coincides with the entry of Wozzeck himself. This heightens the immediacy and intelligibility of the plot, but is somewhat contradictory with the ideals of Schoenberg's expressionism, which seeks to express musically the subconscious unmediated by the conscious.

Berg worked on his opera Lulu, from 1928 to 1935, but failed to complete the third act. According to one view, "Musically complex and highly expressionistic in idiom, Lulu was composed entirely in the 12-tone system", but this is by no means a universally accepted interpretation. The literary basis of the opera is a pair of related plays by Frank Wedekind, whose writing is virtually a "reversal of the expressionist aesthetic", because of its complete indifference to the characters' psychological states of mind, and portrayal of characters whose "personalities have little or no basis in reality and whose distortions are not the product of psychological tension". The plainly evident emotion of Berg's music is dislocated from its cause and "deflected onto something else impossible to define", thereby contradicting its own intensity and undermining the listener's "instinctive obedience to emotive instructions", contrary to expressionism, which "tells its listeners pretty unambiguously how to react". In contrast to the plainly expressionist manner of Wozzeck, therefore, Lulu is closer to the Neue Sachlichkeit (New Objectivity) of the 1920s, and to Bertolt Brecht's epic theatre.

Indeed, by the time Wozzeck was performed in 1925, Schoenberg had introduced his twelve-tone technique to his pupils, representing the end of his expressionist period (in 1923) and roughly the beginning of his twelve-tone period.

As can be seen, Arnold Schoenberg was a central figure in musical expressionism, although Berg, Webern, and Bartók did also contribute significantly, along with various other composers.
