= Opera Company of Boston productions =

This list includes opera productions of the Opera Group and Opera Company of Boston from 1958 to 1990.

== 1958–59 ==
- Voyage to the Moon – Offenbach (first American performance)
- La bohème – Puccini
- The Barber of Seville – Rossini
- The Beggar's Opera – Gay

== 1959–60 ==
- Tosca – Puccini
- Voyage to the Moon – Offenbach
- Hansel and Gretel – Humperdinck
- Carmen – Bizet

== 1960–61 ==
- La traviata – Verdi
- Otello – Verdi
- Hansel and Gretel – Humperdinck
- Falstaff – Verdi
- La bohème – Puccini
- Die Fledermaus – Johann Strauss

== 1961–62 ==
- Command Performance – Robert Middleton (world premiere)
- Manon – Massenet
- Die Meistersinger von Nürnberg – Wagner
- Rigoletto – Verdi

== 1962–63 ==
- Madama Butterfly – Puccini
- The Barber of Seville – Rossini
- Faust – Gounod

== 1964 ==
- Lulu – Berg (2-act version, in English, US East Coast premiere)
- The Magic Flute – Mozart
- I Puritani – Bellini
- Madama Butterfly – Puccini
- L'Elisir d'Amore – Donizetti

== 1965 ==
- The Abduction from the Seraglio – Mozart
- Semiramide – Rossini
- Intolleranza – Nono (first American performance)
- The Tales of Hoffmann – Offenbach (in English)
- Boris Godunov – Mussorgsky (first American performance of original version)

== 1966 ==
- Don Giovanni – Mozart
- Boris Godunov – Mussorgsky
- Hippolyte et Aricie – Rameau (first American performance)
- Moses and Aron – Schoenberg (first American performance)

== 1967 ==
- Don Giovanni – Mozart
- Otello – Verdi
- The Rake's Progress – Stravinsky
- Bartók double bill:
  - Bluebeard's Castle (in Hungarian)
  - The Miraculous Mandarin (pantomime ballet)
- Tosca – Puccini

== 1968 ==
- Tosca – Puccini
- Lulu – Berg
- Carmen – Bizet
- La traviata – Verdi
- Falstaff – Verdi

== 1969 ==
- Bartók triple bill:
  - Bluebeard's Castle (in Hungarian)
  - The Miraculous Mandarin (pantomime ballet)
  - The Wooden Prince (pantomime ballet)
- Lucia di Lammermoor – Donizetti
- Macbeth – Verdi (original 1847 version in Italian)
- The Marriage of Figaro – Mozart (in English)

== 1970 ==
- Der fliegende Holländer – Wagner
- La fille du régiment – Donizetti
- The Good Soldier Schweik – Kurka
- The Fisherman and His Wife – Schuller (world premiere)
- Rigoletto – Verdi

== 1971 ==
- Louise – Charpentier
- La finta giardiniera – Moazrt
- Norma – Bellini

== 1972 ==
- Les Troyens – Berlioz (first American performance of complete version)
- Tosca – Puccini
- La traviata – Verdi

== 1973 ==
- The Bartered Bride – Smetana (in English)
- The Daughter of the Regiment – Donizetti (in English)
- Aufstieg und Fall der Stadt Mahagonny – Weill
- Don Carlos – Verdi (5-act version in French, including 21 minutes of music cut from the Paris premiere)

== 1974 ==
- Don Quichotte – Massenet
- Madama Butterfly – Puccini
- War and Peace – Prokofiev (American stage premiere)
- Il barbiere di Siviglia – Rossini

== 1975 ==
- Falstaff – Verdi
- Così fan tutte – Mozart
- Benvenuto Cellini – Berlioz (first American performance)
- I Capuleti e i Montecchi – Bellini

== 1976 ==
- Fidelio – Beethoven
- Montezuma – Sessions (first American performance)
- The Girl of the Golden West – Puccini (in English)
- Macbeth – Verdi (1865 version in Italian)

== 1977 ==
- Ruslan and Ludmila – Glinka
- La bohème – Puccini (in English)
- Rigoletto – Verdi
- Orfeo ed Euridice – Gluck (in Italian)
- Orpheus in the Underworld – Offenbach (in English)

== 1978 ==
- Stiffelio – Verdi
- Damnation of Faust – Berlioz (in English)
- Don Pasquale – Donizetti
- Tosca – Puccini

== 1979 ==
- Falstaff – Verdi
- Falla double bill:
  - La vida breve
  - El retablo de maese Pedro
- Il barbiere di Siviglia – Rossini
- The Ice Break – Tippett (American premiere)
- Hansel and Gretel – Humperdinck

== 1980 ==
- Die Fledermaus – Johann Strauss
- Der fliegende Holländer – Wagner
- War and Peace – Prokofiev
- Aida – Verdi

== 1981 ==
- Faust – Gounod
- Der Rosenkavalier – Richard Strauss
- Rigoletto – Verdi
- Otello – Verdi

== 1982 ==
- Die Soldaten – Zimmermann (in English, American premiere)
- Aida – Verdi
- La bohème – Puccini
- Orpheus in the Underworld – Offenbach (in English)

== 1983 ==
- Carmen – Bizet
- The Invisible City of Kitezh – Rimsky-Korsakov
- Norma – Bellini
- Turandot – Puccini

== 1984 ==
- Der Freischütz – Weber
- Silver Anniversary Opera Gala with Shirley Verrett, James McCracken, and Ruth Welting
- Madama Butterfly – Puccini
- Il barbiere di Siviglia – Rossini
- Don Giovanni – Mozart
- Les contes d'Hoffmann – Offenbach

== 1985 ==
- Hansel and Gretel – Humperdinck

== 1986 ==
- Turandot – Puccini
- Taverner – Davies
- The Makropulos Case – Janáček
- Tosca – Puccini

== 1987 ==
- Il trovatore – Verdi
- Giulio Cesare – Handel
- Madama Butterfly – Puccini
- Don Pasquale – Donizetti

== 1988 ==
- Médée – Cherubini (in French with classical Greek dialog)
- Dead Souls – Shchedrin (American premiere)
- The Threepenny Opera – Weill
- La traviata – Verdi

== 1989 ==
- Mass – Bernstein
- Aida – Verdi
- Der Rosenkavalier – Richard Strauss
- La bohème – Puccini

== 1990 ==
- Madama Butterfly – Puccini
- The Magic Flute – Mozart
- The Balcony – Robert DiDomenica (world premiere)
