= Egisto Tango =

Italian conductor (1873–1951)

Egisto Tango (November 13, 1873, in Rome – October 5, 1951, in Copenhagen) was an Italian conductor, whose premieres included The Wooden Prince and Bluebeard's Castle by Béla Bartók.

His career was launched in Venice and he conducted at La Scala and the New York Metropolitan Opera before accepting the job at the Budapest National Opera (1913–1919). According to Baker's, he moved to Copenhagen in 1929 (first conducting there in 1927); according to Grove's he worked at the Volksoper in Vienna from 1925 to 1933.

According to a New York Tribune advertisement published in January 13, 1910, Tango conducted the first-ever live public radio broadcast performance.
