= Jenő Ádám =

Hungarian music educator, composer, conductor

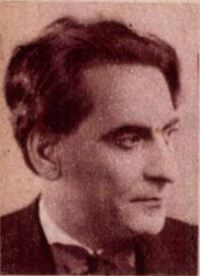
Jenő Ádám

Jenő Ádám (12 December 1896 – 15 May 1982) was a Hungarian music educator, composer, and conductor.

== Early life and education ==
Jenő Ádám was born in Szigetszentmiklós (Kingdom of Hungary) on 12 December 1896. From 1911-1915 he attended the teacher-training college in Budapest where he received instruction in the organ and music theory. During World War I he was a prisoner of war (POW) in Russia from 1916-1920; residing in that period in Western Siberia and Turkestan. While a POW he was allowed to organize and direct a men's choir and orchestra.

After being released from captivity, Ádám returned to Hungary where he studied at the Franz Liszt Academy of Music (FLAM) from 1921 through 1925. There he was a pupil of Zoltán Kodály, and earned diplomas in both music composition and Hungarian literature in 1925. He later studied conducting with Felix Weingartner in Basel, Switzerland; attending his masterclasses from 1933-1935.

== Teaching career ==
In 1929 Ádám joined the staff of FLAM as a conductor of one of its student choirs and its student orchestra. He conducted the orchestra through 1939, and was a choral conductor at the school until 1954. He developed a close working relationship with Kodály. Beginning in 1935, the two collaborated on a long term project to reform music teaching in the lower and middle schools; ultimately producing a series of seminal textbooks on singing together. In 1939 he became a professor at FLAM; teaching choral conducting, singing, Hungarian folk music, and music education methods until his retirement in 1959. He served as the chair of FLAM's vocal music program from 1942 through 1957.

Many of Ádám's teaching methods and curricula developed during that project were adopted by Kodály and are now a part of the Kodály Method. Ádám was the author of several books on music education that were published in Hungary during the 1940s, two of which were co-authored with Kodály. His methodology has had a profound impact on music education internationally and is still studied today by students of the Kodaly Method. The Organization of American Kodály Educators has established an academic scholarship in his name

Ádám was also involved in broader music education efforts targeted toward the general population in Hungary. He gave several public lectures that were broadcast on Hungarian television and radio that aimed to popularize both Hungarian folk music and Western classical music. One of these was his own radio program, Fifteen Minutes of Folksong. He also gave lectures on television and radio programs as a guest outside of Hungary; continuing his advocacy on the international stage. He also served terms on the governing boards of the International Society for Music Education and the Hungarian division of the International Council for Traditional Music.

== Conductor and composer ==
Ádám's first professional conducting assignment was leading a performance of Joseph Haydn's oratorio The Seasons in Budapest in 1929. He was principal conductor of the Budapest Choral and Orchestral Society from 1929-1933, and was conductor of the Budai Dalárda men's choir from 1933-1942; a group with whom he gave a concert tour of Europe. He concurrently served as conductor of the Budapest Palestrina Choir in 1935-1936.

Ádám was a champion of George Frideric Handel's music in Hungary, and was responsible for conducting the Hungarian premieres of several of his oratorios; among them Dettingen Te Deum. While employed as the chorus master of the Hungarian State Opera he conducted the first performance by that company of Henry Purcell's opera Dido and Aeneas at the Hungarian State Opera House with Ella Némethy and Imre Palló in the title roles. It was the first time the opera was sung in the Hungarian language; although it had earlier been performed in Kecskemét in the original English. He conducted the Hungarian premiere of L'enfance du Christ by Hector Berlioz.

As a composer, he was best known for his vocal music which included operas, folk song arrangements, art songs, choral music, and works for chorus and orchestra. His operas include Ez a mi földünk (1923), Magyar karácsony (1931) and Mária Veronika (1938), of which the latter two premiered in Budapest at the Royal Hungarian Opera House. He was named an Artist of Merit of the Hungarian People's Republic in 1955, and was awarded the Kossuth Prize in 1957.

== Books ==
- A skálától a szimfóniáig (From the Scale to the Symphony, Budapest, 1943)
- Szó-mi (Singing Textbooks for Elementary Schools, Budapest, 1943, with Zoltán Kodály)
- Módszeres énektanítás a relatív szolmizáció alapján (Systematic Singing Teaching Based on the Tonic Sol-fa, Budapest, 1944; Eng. trans., 1971 as Growing in Music with Movable Do)
- Énekeskönyv (Singing Book, Budapest, 1947, republished in English in March 1998 as Series for elementary schools, with Zoltán Kodály).
