= Oszkár Kálmán =

Hungarian bass (1887–1971)

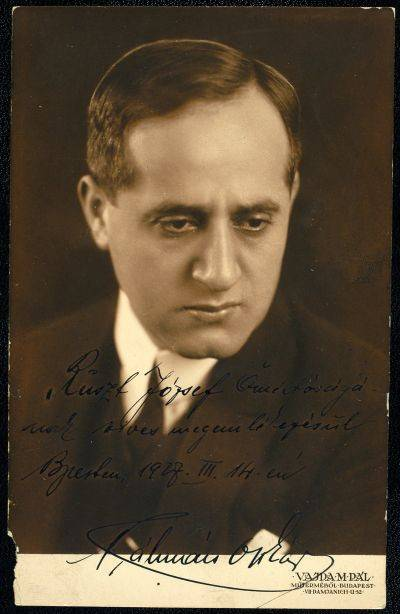
Kálmán in 1928

Oszkár Kálmán (19 June 1887 – 17 September 1971) was a Hungarian bass, remembered as the first Bluebeard. He was Jewish and born in Kisszentpéter (in present day Romania) and in 1913 made his debut as Sarastro at the Royal Opera House in Budapest, where created the title role of Béla Bartók's opera A kékszakállú herceg vára in 1918. He was among the first singers of Zoltán Kodály's opus nine songs at the Budapest conservatory. By the 1920s, he was resident at the Berlin Staatsoper, and in 1929 he took part in the premiere of Brecht's Badener Lehrstück vom Einverständnis with music by Paul Hindemith. In 1941, he was singing Osmin at the Goldmark Theatre in Budapest.

Kálmán died in Budapest in 1971 .
