= Ella Némethy =

Hungarian mezzo-soprano (1895–1961)

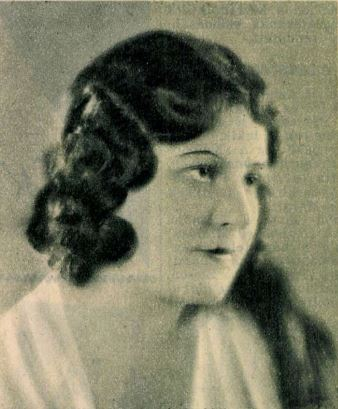
- Ella Némethy, 1937
- Born: Gabriella Némethy; 5 April 1891; Sátoraljaújhely, Hungary
- Died: 14 June 1961 (aged 70); Budapest, Hungary
- Occupation: Opera singer
- Years active: 1919–1948
- Children: Baba Macnee

Ella Némethy (5 April 1891 – 14 June 1961) was a Hungarian mezzo-soprano who had an active international career in operas and concerts from 1919 to 1948. Music historian Péter P. Várnai writes in The New Grove Dictionary of Music and Musicians that "she was the leading mezzo-soprano in the interwar years, especially in Wagnerian roles such as Brünnhilde, Isolde and Kundry. Her interpretations were characterized by vocal amplitude, rich colouring and grand declamation." She was the mother of author Baba Macnee, who would marry actor Patrick Macnee in 1988.

== Life and career ==
Born in Sátoraljaújhely, Némethy studied at the Franz Liszt Academy of Music in Budapest, and privately with Ettore Panizza in Milan. She made her professional opera debut in 1919 as Dalila in Camille Saint-Saëns's Samson et Dalila at the Hungarian State Opera House. She remained a resident artist at that opera house for three decades where she performed a highly varied repertoire; including performances of Amneris in Aida, Brünnhilde in Die Walküre, Götterdämmerung, and Siegfried, Eboli in Don Carlos, Leonore in Fidelio, Kundry in Parsifal, Ortrud in Lohengrin, Santuzza in Cavalleria rusticana, and Venus in Tannhäuser among others.

Némethy appeared as a guest artist with several major opera houses around the world, including the Berlin State Opera, the Teatro Colón, and leading opera houses in Italy, Spain, and the United States. A major triumph of her career was performances of Brünnhilde in Wagner's Der Ring des Nibelungen at La Scala in 1937 and 1938. She also sang Brünnhilde for her debut at the Liceu in 1932/1933. In May 1938 she performed the role of Judith in the Italian premiere of Béla Bartók's Bluebeard's Castle at the Maggio Musicale Fiorentino.

Upon her retirement from the stage in 1948, Némethy was named a lifelong member of the Hungarian State Opera House. A 1936 recording of her Judith to Mihály Székely's Bluebeard was posthumously released on CD in 2015. Her performance of Ortrud in Lohengrin is also preserved on a 1948 recording with conductor Otto Klemperer.
