= Mihály Székely =

Hungarian bass singer

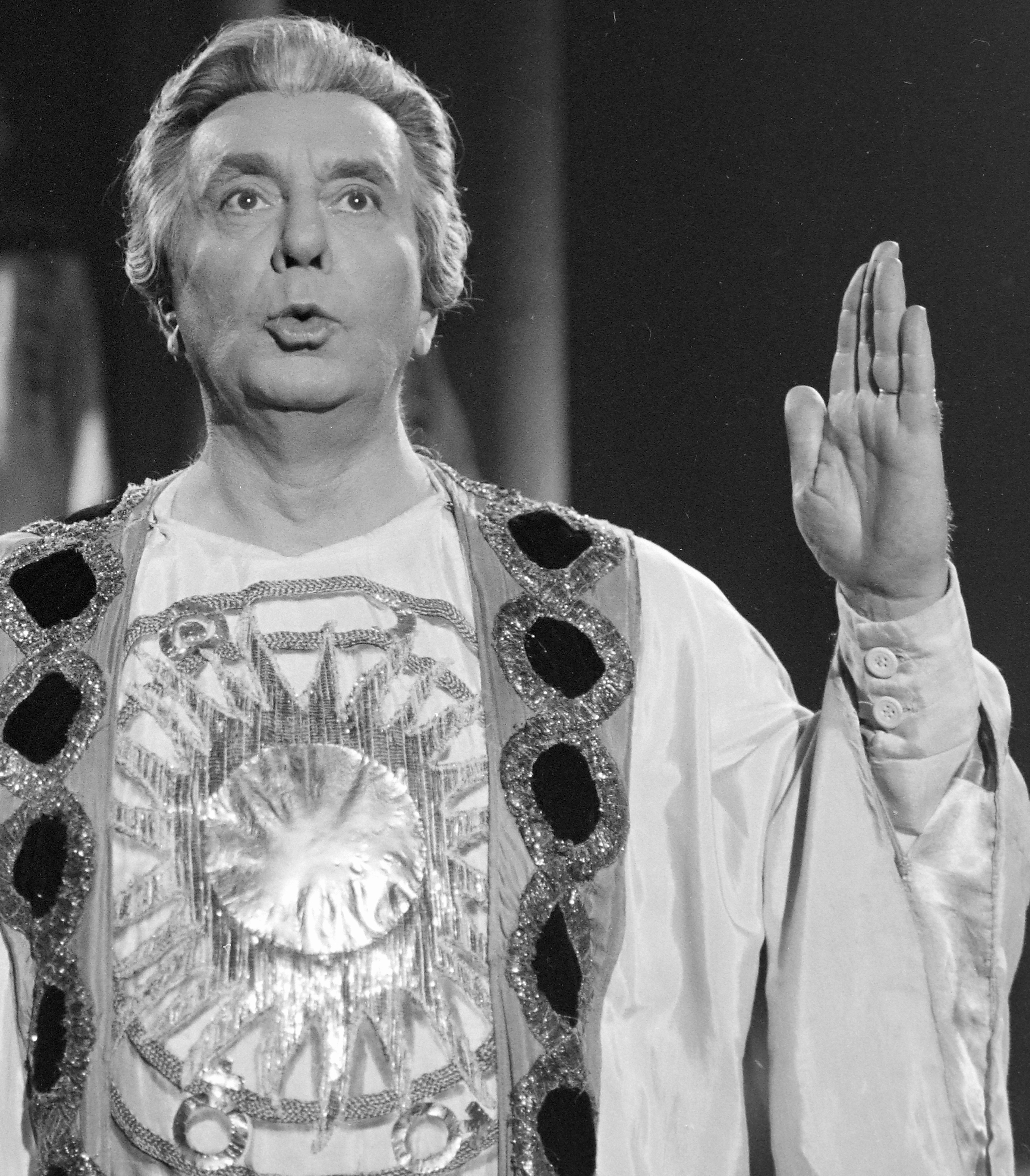

Mihály Székely (May 8, 1901 in Jászberény – March 22, 1963) was a Hungarian bass singer famous for Mozartian roles. His name in Hungarian form is Székely Mihály, his original family name was Spagatner.

He debuted as Ferrando (Il trovatore) in 1920 at the Budapest Opera, where he remained a principal singer until his death. His Metropolitan Opera debut was as Hunding (Die Walküre) in 1947. He recorded two versions of Béla Bartók's opera Bluebeard's Castle and worked closely with the composer at the 1936 revival.

His most famous roles were King Philip (Don Carlo), Fiesco (Simon Boccanegra), Osmin (Die Entführung aus dem Serail), Sarastro (Die Zauberflöte), Leporello (Don Giovanni), König Marke (Tristan und Isolde), Pogner (Die Meistersinger von Nürnberg), Boris Godunov, Basilio (Il barbiere di Siviglia), Gremin (Eugene Onegin) and Baron Ochs (Der Rosenkavalier). He sang in the Glyndebourne Festival several times, mostly in Mozart operas.

He died in Budapest, aged 61.

== Sources ==
- Székely, Mihály by Peter P Varnai, in 'The New Grove Dictionary of Opera', ed. Stanley Sadie (London, 1992) ISBN 0-333-73432-7
