= István Thomán =

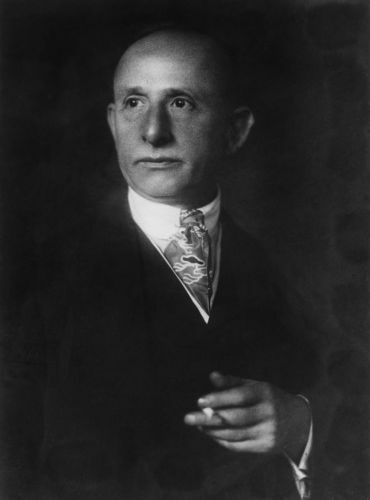
- Thomán in 1932.

Background information
- Born: 4 November 1862; Homonna, Kingdom of Hungary, Austrian Empire
- Died: 22 September 1940 (aged 77); Budapest, Hungary
- Genres: Classical music
- Occupation: Pianist · music educator
- Instrument: Piano

István Thomán (Hungarian: [ˈiʃtvaːn ˈtomaːn]; 4 November 1862 – 22 September 1940) was a Hungarian piano virtuoso and music educator. He was a notable piano teacher, with students including Béla Bartók, Ernő Dohnányi, Paul de Marky who later taught Oscar Peterson in Quebec, Gisela Selden-Goth, and Georges Cziffra. His six-volume Technique of Piano Playing is still in use today.

== Early life and education ==
Thomán was born in Homonna, Zemplén County, Kingdom of Hungary (now in Slovakia) in 1862 to Jewish parents, Dr. David Thomán and Rosa Weisberger. Recognised for his talent, he became a favorite student of Franz Liszt. Liszt appointed him to teach at the Royal Hungarian Academy of Music in Budapest, but had to retire suddenly at the age of 45.

== Career ==
Thomán toured with Liszt, was present at his death and was a pallbearer at his funeral. Thomán, along with fellow Liszt student Árpád Szendy, were important in carrying on the Liszt style through their teaching at the Royal Hungarian Academy of Music.

As a teacher at the Royal Academy, Thomán took on a 17-year-old Ernő Dohnányi as a student in 1894. In 1903, a 21-year-old Béla Bartók dedicated his Study for the Left Hand to Thomán. The study is a Sonata performed entirely with one hand. In his Studies on Chopin's Études Leopold Godowsky dedicated Opus 25 No. 11 (A minor) to Thomán.

Thomán's daughter, Mária Thomán (1899–1948), became a noted concert violinist and studied with Jenő Hubay, Franz von Vecsey, Carl Flesch and Alma Moodie. She gave concerts throughout Europe, both as a soloist and in the accompaniment of philharmonic orchestras and chamber ensembles.

== Death ==
Thomán died a little before his 78th birthday in Budapest on 22 September 1940.
