= Gisella Selden-Goth =

Hungarian composer and musicologist (1884–1975)

Gisella Selden-Goth (6 June 1884 – 5 September 1975) was a Hungarian author, composer and musicologist who became an American citizen in 1939. She composed at least four string quartets and donated her large collection of original music manuscripts to the Library of Congress.

== Biography ==
Selden-Goth was born in Budapest to Michael and Rosalia Schlesinger. Her music teachers included Béla Bartók, Ferruccio Busoni, and István Thomán. Her set of piano compositions, Vier Präludien, was one of 10 winners (out of 874 submissions) in the 1910 Signale für die musikalische Welt competition in Germany. She married Ernst Goth and they had a daughter, Trudy Goth, who became a dancer and journalist.

Selden-Goth lived in Berlin and Florence, Italy, before emigrating to America in 1938. She returned to Florence in 1950 and remained there until her death in 1975. She served as a music critic for newspapers in Berlin, Prague, Switzerland, and Budapest, most notably for Prager Tagblatt, a German newspaper in Prague. She also wrote books about Busoni and Arturo Toscanini and edited a collection of Felix Mendelssohn's letters. She maintained a lengthy correspondence with the Austrian writer Stefan Zweig, often discussing their mutual interest in collecting original music scores. After Zweig's suicide, Selden-Goth commented that, "A chamber group in a house or the opportunity to hear a good orchestra might have relieved the tension of that mind tortured by personal forebodings and by the vision of mankind in agony." She also corresponded with composer Ernest Bloch and musicologist Hans Moldenhauer.

Selden-Goth's music is published today by Universal Edition. Her prose works and musical compositions include:

== Selected literary publications ==
=== Articles ===
- "A New Collection of Music Manuscripts in the United States", The Musical Quarterly, vol. 26, no. 2, April 1940
- "Neue Wege der musikalischen Erziehung" [New Ways in Music Education], Die Musik, vol. 16, 1924

=== Bibliography ===
- Arturo Toscanini (edited by Selden-Goth)
- Felix Mendelssohn: Letters (edited by Selden-Goth)
- Ferruccio Busoni: Der Versuch eines Porträts [Ferruccio Busoni: An Attempt at a Portrait]
- Quattro Brevi Studi per la Mano Sinistra, Four Short Studies for the Left Hand (c.1958) Israeli Music Publications Ltd., Tel Aviv 1958

== Selected music works ==
=== Chamber music ===
- Quintet, Op. 35 (for strings)
- String Quartets No. 1, 2, 3, and 4
- String Trio
- Suite for Violin and Piano

=== Piano ===
- Prelude and Fugue for Two Pianos (1956)
- Vier Präludien, Signale competition winner (1910)

=== Vocal music ===
- Vom mönchischen Leben [Of Monastic Life], Op. 44, song cycle (text from The Book of Hours by Rainer Maria Rilke)
- Cantata
- Songs
- The Pilgrim (baritone, mixed chorus and orchestra)
