= The Wooden Prince =

Pantomime ballet

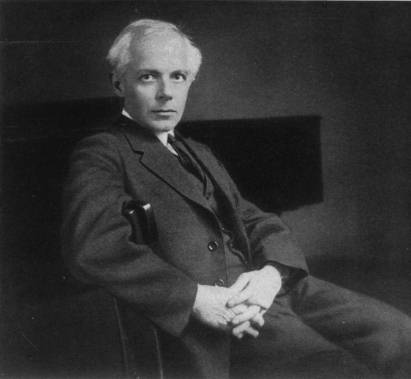
Béla Bartók in 1927

The Wooden Prince (Hungarian: A fából faragott királyfi), Op. 13, Sz. 60, is a one-act pantomime ballet composed by Béla Bartók in 1914–1916 (orchestrated 1916–1917) to a scenario by Béla Balázs. It was first performed at the Budapest Opera on 12 May 1917 under the conductor Egisto Tango.

== The work ==
The Wooden Prince has never achieved the fame of Bartók's other ballet, The Miraculous Mandarin (1926) but it was enough of a success at its premiere to prompt the Opera House to stage Bartók's opera, Bluebeard's Castle (which had not been performed since 1911) in the following year. Like Bluebeard, The Wooden Prince uses a huge orchestra (it even includes saxophones), though the critic Paul Griffiths believes it sounds like an earlier work in style (Griffiths p. 71). The music shows the influence of Debussy and Richard Strauss, as well as Wagner (the introduction echoes the prelude of Das Rheingold). Bartók used a scenario by the poet Béla Balázs, which had appeared in the influential literary journal Nyugat in 1912.

== Instrumentation ==
This work contains the largest orchestration which Bartók ever scored for:

- Woodwinds: 4 flutes (third doubling on piccolo 2, fourth on piccolo 1), 4 oboes (third on English horn 2, fourth on English horn 1), 4 clarinets (third doubling on E♭ clarinet, fourth on bass clarinet), 4 bassoons (third and fourth doubling on contrabassoons), Alto saxophone in E♭, tenor saxophone in B♭ (doubling on baritone saxophone in E♭)
- Brass: 4 horns, 6 trumpets (4 trumpets and 2 cornets, all in B♭), 3 trombones, tuba
- Percussion (timpanist and 5 players): timpani, bass drum, cymbals, snare drum, field drum, triangle, tam-tam, glockenspiel, xylophone, castanets
- 2 harps, celesta for 4 hands
- Strings: 16 first and 16 second violins, 12 violas, 10 cellos, 8 double basses

== Synopsis ==
A prince falls in love with a princess, but is stopped from reaching her by a fairy who makes a forest and a stream rise against him. To attract the princess' attention, the prince hangs his cloak on a staff and fixes a crown and locks of his hair to it. The princess catches sight of this "wooden prince" and comes to dance with it. The fairy brings the wooden prince to life and the princess goes away with that instead of the real prince, who falls into despair. The fairy takes pity on him as he sleeps, dresses him in finery and reduces the wooden prince to lifelessness again. The princess returns and is finally united with the human prince.

== Recordings ==
- The Wooden Prince (with Cantata Profana) Chicago Symphony Orchestra, conducted by Pierre Boulez (Deutsche Grammophon, 1992); also recorded by Boulez with the New York Philharmonic
- The Wooden Prince (with Kossuth) Hungarian National Philharmonic Orchestra, conducted by Zoltán Kocsis (Hungaroton SACD, 2007)
- The Wooden Prince Bournemouth Symphony Orchestra, conducted by Marin Alsop (Naxos, 2008)
- The Wooden Prince (with Music for Strings, Percussion and Celesta) London Symphony Orchestra, conducted by Antal Dorati (Mercury Living Presence, 1964; 434 357–2)
- The Wooden Prince Helsinki Philharmonic Orchestra, conducted by Susanna Mälkki (2019)
- The Wooden Prince WDR Symphony Orchestra Cologne, conducted by Cristian Măcelaru (Linn, 2022; CKD 714)

== Sources ==
- Paul Griffiths: Bartók (J. M. Dent, "The Master Musicians", 1984)
- Booklet note to the Boulez recording
