= The Baden-Baden Lesson on Consent =

1929 stage work by Bertolt Brecht and Paul Hindemith

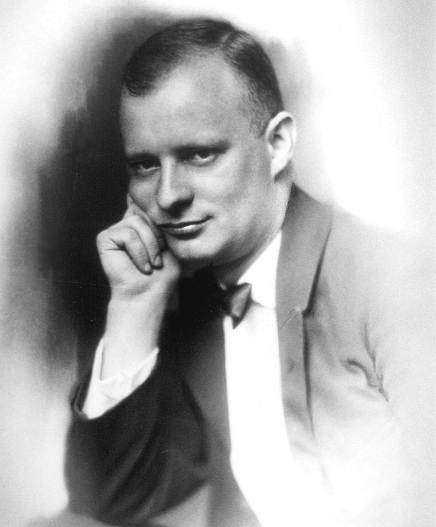
Paul Hindemith, 1923

The Baden-Baden Lesson on Consent (German: Badener Lehrstück vom Einverständnis) is a Lehrstück by the German dramatist Bertolt Brecht, written in collaboration with Slatan Dudow and Elisabeth Hauptmann. Under the title Lehrstück it was first performed, with music by Paul Hindemith, as part of the Baden-Baden festival on 28 July 1929, at the Stadthalle, Baden-Baden, directed by Brecht, designed by Heinz Porep.

== Premiere ==
Brecht's programme note described the work as unfinished and as the "product of various theories of a musical, dramatic and political nature aiming at the collective practice of the arts". The 50-minute piece was conceived as a multi-media performance, including scenes of physical knockabout clowning, choral sections and a short film by Carl Koch, Dance of Death, featuring Valeska Gert.

Along with its companion, the radio cantata Lindbergh's Flight, the piece was offered as an example of a new genre, "the teaching-play or Lehrstück", in which the traditional division between actor and audience is abolished; the piece is intended for its participants only (Brecht specifically including the film makers and clowns along with the chorus.) The final chorus of Lindbergh's Flight appears at the beginning of The Baden-Baden Lesson on Consent. "Cruelty, violence and death" are explored by the play, which "broaches the subject of complicity between the helper and the forces of power and violence". The action concerns a wrecked flight crew being brought to terms with their non-existence. While the pilot complains that he must not die, the others accept that their significance lies in being anonymous parts of a larger whole.

A grotesque clown scene, in which the first clown, called Smith, is violently dismembered by his two friends in an attempt to alleviate his pain, caused spectators at the Baden-Baden festival to riot, according to the actor who played Smith; the playwright Gerhart Hauptmann walked out. (This clown scene was later reworked by Heiner Müller in his Heartplay, 1981). Despite the controversy, the production was a critical success. Performances in Vienna, Munich, Mainz, Dresden, Breslau and Frankfurt followed. Schott Music published Lehrstück the same year with Hindemith's score.

== From Lehrstück to The Baden-Baden Lesson on Consent ==
Brecht almost immediately began revising, and took especial exception to Hindemith's performance notes sanctioning cuts. Brecht approached Schott directly and it was from the publisher that Hindemith learned of the demanded changes in the text, which he was not interested in setting to new music. Brecht's text was published in 1930 in volume two of his Versuche, and Schott was forced to take the score out of print.

One disagreement concerned the suitability of the clown scene. In two letters to his wife, Hindemith observed that the scene was better spoken than played [acted] and, later, that with neither clowns nor film "the piece is beautiful and has the effect of an old classic." Brecht for his part objected to Hindemith's conception of Gebrauchsmusik which leaned toward Gemeinschaftsmusik or Hausmusik, that is, communal music written for the use of the players, in the case of Lehrstück an orchestra of amateurs who were advised to freely make cuts according to circumstances. While Brecht's conception of the Lehrstück form also aimed at engaging the participants, he naturally viewed the music's 'use' as incidental to the ideas in the play and criticised Hindemith's different end: "the cellist in the orchestra, father of a numerous family, now began to play not from philosophical conviction but for pleasure. The culinary principle was saved." Each dug in his heels and after a 1934 radio broadcast in Brussels neither allowed performances of the other's version. Brecht eventually published his revision in his Collected Plays but there were no public performances until a revival opened on 14 May 1958 in New York, nearly two years after Brecht's death.

== Roles ==
Roles, voice types, premiere cast
Role	Voice type	Premiere cast, 28 July 1929 Conductors: Alfons Dressel and Ernst Wolff
Pilot	tenor	Josef Witt
Leader of the chorus	bass-baritone	Oszkár Kálmán
Speaker		Gerda Müller-Scherchen
Three mechanics, also three clowns	(spoken)	Theo Lingen (Herr Schmitt), Karl Paulsen, Benno Carlé
Trained semichorus	mixed chorus	Hugo Holle's madrigal singers

== Synopsis ==
As ultimately published by Brecht, the eleven scenes are:	The numbers in the score:
1. Report on the flight 2. The crash 3. Investigation into whether humans help their kind 4. Denial of help 5. Council; 6. Contemplation of death 7. Reading of the commentary 8. The examination 9. Fame & expropriation 10. Ostracism; 11. Consent	1. Report on the flight 2. 1st investigation into whether humans help their kind 3. The chorus addresses the fallen 4. Contemplation of death (Film); 5. Reading of the commentary 6. 2nd investigation into whether humans help their kind (Clowns); 7. Examination

The relation between these and the Lehrstück 'fragment' is not as straightforward as the table suggests. The first two are a simple splitting of Hindemith's #1, whereas Brecht's #3 is a merging of the original first and second investigations.
