= Phonomotor =

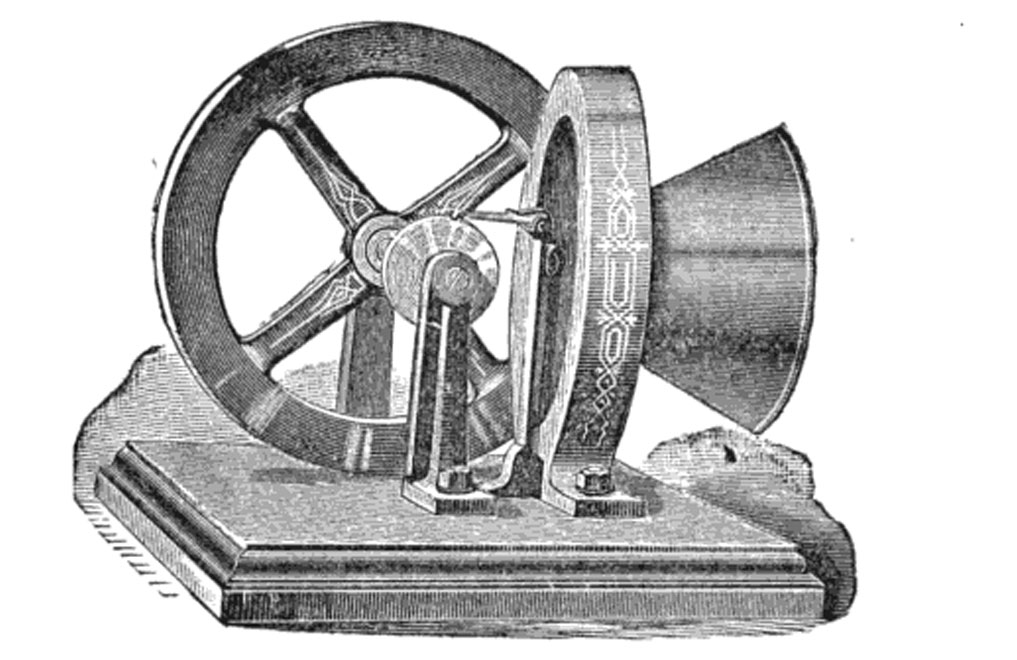
Edison's "Phonomotor" or "Vocal Engine"

The phonomotor or "vocal engine" was a device invented by Thomas Edison in 1878 to measure the mechanical force of sound. It converted sound energy or sound power into rotary motion which could drive a machine such as a small saw or drill. It derived from his work on the telephone and phonograph.

== Operation ==
Sound waves entering a mouthpiece and falling on a diaphragm were conveyed by a piece of rubber tubing and a spring to a pawl, which vibrated against a very fine-toothed ratchet wheel. The diaphragm and mouthpiece were similar to those used on the phonograph. Vibrations caused by the voice caused a shaft and flywheel to rotate. Steady pressure from breath produced no motion, but some voices could produce rapid motion. The speed of rotation depended on the pitch of the sound. It was able to operate a small drill or saw which could bore or cut wood. When a long sustained sound got the flywheel up to an appreciable speed, considerable force was required to stop it.

== Impact ==
The Chicago Tribune in May 1878 predicted that it would be the basis for sound-powered toys such as dolls which bow when spoken to, though none are known to have been marketed. Edison described it as a scientific toy. A U.S patent application was filed for the "Vocal Engine" in 1878, and a patent was granted on December 10 of that year. An 1884 Nature article on sound mills, similar devices to the phonomotor, reported that Edison's device, "literally accomplished the feat of talking a hole through a deal board." A restored model of the phonomotor is in the Edison Menlo Park laboratory exhibit at the Greenfield Village Museum in Dearborn, Michigan, and was exhibited in operation for visitors in the 1930s.
