= Privileged pattern =

Composition technique

In music a privileged pattern is a motive, figure, or chord which is repeated and transposed so that the transpositions form a recognizable pattern. The pattern of transposition may be either by a repeated interval, an interval cycle, or a stepwise line of whole tones and semitones. The pattern is said to be privileged because it requires no context and is a precompositional technique. (Wilson 1992, p. 39-40)

== See also ==
- Sequence (music)

== Sources ==
- Wilson, Paul (1992). The Music of Béla Bartók. ISBN 0-300-05111-5.
