= Kossuth (Bartók) =

Symphonic poem by Béla Bartók

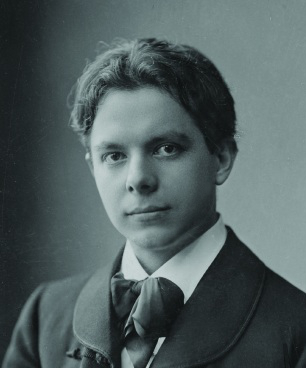
Béla Bartók in 1903

Kossuth, Sz. 21, BB. 31, DD. 75a is a symphonic poem composed by Béla Bartók inspired by the Hungarian politician Lajos Kossuth.

== Musical background ==
The music of Richard Strauss was an early influence on Bartók, who was studying at the Budapest Royal Academy of Music when he encountered the symphonic poems of Strauss, Also sprach Zarathustra and Ein Heldenleben. Bartók was present at the 1902 Budapest premiere of Also sprach Zarathustra, where he met Strauss in person. According to Bartók

"I was aroused as by a flash of lightning by the first Budapest performance of Also Sprach Zarathustra. It contained the seeds for a new life. I started composing again."

Soon after, Bartok first made a piano reduction of Ein Heldenleben. He then went on to compose his own symphonic poem Kossuth completing the piano score by spring of 1903 and the orchestral version in summer of 1903 in Gmunden in Austria.

== Historical background ==
The symphonic poem was composed as a tribute to Hungarian politician Lajos Kossuth, hero of the Hungarian Revolution of 1848 and musically chronicles his failed attempt to win Hungary's independence from Austria in 1848–49. Bartók has himself penned detailed commentaries on the score, etching out a programme and subjecting it to close thematic analysis. Although the work is written as a single movement, it is nonetheless complex in its orchestration, with ten interrelated movements or sections. The piece begins with Bartók sketching a portrait of his hero and ends with a funeral march, which was also arranged for piano by the composer. The symphonic poems of Liszt and Strauss heavily influence the work, as Bartók borrows ideas from them to develop harmonies, chromatic progressions and for instrumentation. He also added a number of his individual and original Hungarian features to it. Throughout the work, a mocking satire on the imperial Austrian national anthem, "Gott erhalte Franz den Kaiser", is used in the form of a recurring leitmotif.

== Analysis ==
The music relates the story of Kossuth, starting with a portrait of him, then painting a picture of the Austrians approaching by using a minor key parody of the imperial Austrian national anthem, the ensuing battle and defeat of the Hungarians.

The piece lasts around twenty minutes and is in ten movements as follows:

1. Kossuth
2. Why are you so grieved, my dear husband?
3. The fatherland is in danger!
4. Formerly we had a better life...
5. Then our fate changed for the worse...
6. Up and fight them!
7. Come, come! You splendid lads you valiant Hungarian warriors!
8. (without title)
9. All is over!
10. Everything is quiet, very quiet...

It is scored for piccolo, 3 flutes (1st doubling piccolo), 3 oboes, 1 cor anglais, 1 E♭ clarinet, 2 clarinets in B♭ and A, 1 bass clarinet in B♭ and A, 3 bassoons, 1 contrabassoon, 8 horns in F, 4 trumpets in B♭ (1st and 2nd doubling F, 2nd also doubling C), 1 bass trumpet in C, 3 trombones, 2 tenor tubas, 1 tuba, 3 timpani, cymbals, triangle, snare drum, bass drum, gong, 2 harps, 32 violins, 12 violas, 10 celli, and 8 contrabasses.

Bartók imbued his own composition with Hungarian colour, using elements from Franz Liszt's style. In the second to last movement, marcia funebre (entitled 'All is over!'), a modified but distinct theme from Liszt's Hungarian Rhapsody No. 2 can be heard.

== Performance history ==
The work was written in two stages between April and August 1903. Bartók showed the piano score of the piece to conductor Hans Richter. This prompted a promise of performance with the orchestra Richter directed at the time, The Hallé, which resulted in the orchestral version. However, the piece was premiered in Budapest at the hands of the Budapest Philharmonic Society on January 13, 1904, where it created a sensation. It was premiered outside of Hungary for the first time in Manchester by Richter, a month later.

== Recordings ==
- Budapest Symphony Orchestra, conducted by György Lehel (Hungaroton)
- Hungarian National Philharmonic Orchestra, conducted by Zoltán Kocsis (Hungaroton)
- Budapest Festival Orchestra, conducted by Iván Fischer (1998, Philips) - This recording was rated a 'Critics' 1st choice' (Legendary performances, Essential recordings) by UK's Gramophone magazine.
- San Francisco Symphony, conducted by Herbert Blomstedt (1995, Decca)
