= Borsodszirák =

- Seal

- Location of Borsod-Abaúj-Zemplén county in Hungary

- Location of Borsodszirák
- Coordinates: 48.26064°N 20.76881°E
- Country: Hungary
- County: Borsod-Abaúj-Zemplén

Area
  - Total: 11.01 km^{2} (4.25 sq mi)

Population (2004)
  - Total: 1,210
  - Density: 109.9/km^{2} (285/sq mi)
- Time zone: UTC+1 (CET)
  - Summer (DST): UTC+2 (CEST)
- Postal code: 3796
- Area code: 48

Borsodszirák is a village in Borsod-Abaúj-Zemplén county, Hungary.
