= Béla Bartók =

Hungarian composer (1881–1945)

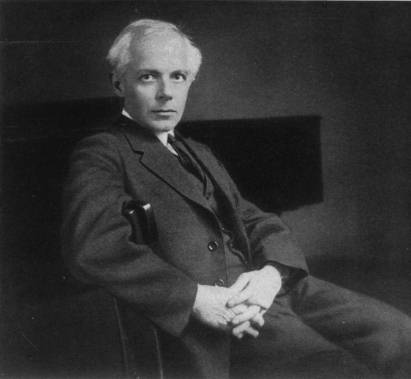
- Béla Bartók in 1927
- Born: 25 March 1881; Nagyszentmiklós, Kingdom of Hungary
- Died: 26 September 1945 (aged 64); New York City, U.S.
- Occupations: Composer, pianist and ethnomusicologist
- Works: List of compositions

Béla Viktor János Bartók (/ˈbeɪlə ˈbɑːrtɒk/; Hungarian: [ˈbɒrtoːk ˈbeːlɒ]; 25 March 1881 – 26 September 1945) was a Hungarian composer, pianist and ethnomusicologist. He is considered one of the most important composers of the 20th century; he and Franz Liszt are regarded as Hungary's greatest composers. Among his notable works are the opera Bluebeard's Castle, the ballet The Miraculous Mandarin, Music for Strings, Percussion and Celesta, the Concerto for Orchestra and six string quartets. Through his collection and analytical study of folk music, he was one of the founders of comparative musicology, which later became known as ethnomusicology. Per Anthony Tommasini, Bartók "has empowered generations of subsequent composers to incorporate folk music and classical traditions from whatever culture into their works," and was "a formidable modernist who in the face of Schoenberg’s breathtaking formulations showed another way, forging a language that was an amalgam of tonality, unorthodox scales and atonal wanderings." His work is often described as being a combination of traditional peasants' folk music and avant-garde music.

== Biography ==
=== Childhood and early years (1881–1898) ===
Bartók was born in the Banatian town of Nagyszentmiklós in the Kingdom of Hungary, part of Austria-Hungary (present-day Sânnicolau Mare, Romania) on 25 March 1881. On his father's side, the Bartók family was a Hungarian lower noble family, originating from Borsodszirák, Borsod. His paternal grandmother was a Catholic of Bunjevci origin, but considered herself Hungarian. Bartók's father (1855–1888) was also named Béla. Bartók's mother, Paula (née Voit) (1857–1939), spoke Hungarian fluently. A native of Turócszentmárton (present-day Martin, Slovakia), she had German, Hungarian and Slovak or Polish ancestry.

Béla displayed notable musical talent very early in life. According to his mother, he could distinguish between different dance rhythms that she played on the piano before he learned to speak in complete sentences. By the age of four he was able to play 40 pieces on the piano, and his mother began formally teaching him the next year.

In 1888, when he was seven, his father, the director of an agricultural school, died suddenly. His mother then took Béla and his sister, Erzsébet, to live in Nagyszőlős (present-day Vynohradiv, Ukraine) and then in Pressburg (present-day Bratislava, Slovakia). Béla gave his first public recital aged 11 in Nagyszőlős, to positive critical reception. Among the pieces he played was his own first composition, written two years previously: a short piece called "The Course of the Danube". Shortly thereafter, László Erkel accepted him as a pupil.

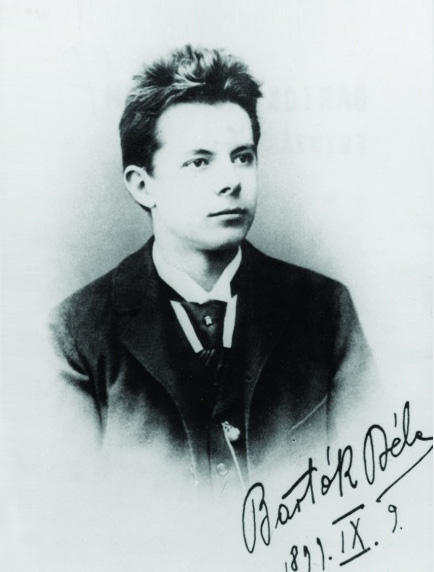
Bartók in his high school graduation photo, in 1899

=== Early musical career (1899–1908) ===
From 1899 to 1903, Bartók studied piano under István Thomán, a former student of Franz Liszt, and composition under János Koessler at the Royal Academy of Music in Budapest. There he met Zoltán Kodály, who made a strong impression on him and became a lifelong friend and colleague. In 1903, Bartók wrote his first major orchestral work, Kossuth, a symphonic poem that honored Lajos Kossuth, hero of the Hungarian Revolution of 1848.

The music of Richard Strauss, whom he met in 1902 at the Budapest premiere of Also sprach Zarathustra, strongly influenced his early work. When visiting a holiday resort in the summer of 1904, Bartók overheard a young nanny, Lidi Dósa from Kibéd in Transylvania, sing folk songs to the children in her care. This sparked his lifelong dedication to folk music.

Beginning in 1907, he came under the influence of French composer Claude Debussy, whose compositions Kodály had brought back from Paris. Bartók's large-scale orchestral works were still in the style of Johannes Brahms and Strauss, but he wrote a number of small piano pieces which showed his growing interest in folk music. The first piece to show clear signs of this new interest was the String Quartet No. 1 in A minor (1908), which contains folk-like elements. He began teaching as a piano professor at the Liszt Academy of Music in Budapest, which freed him from touring Europe as a pianist. Among his notable students were Fritz Reiner, Sir Georg Solti, György Sándor, Ernő Balogh, Gisela Selden-Goth, and Lili Kraus. After Bartók moved to the United States, he taught Jack Beeson and Violet Archer.

In 1908, Bartok and Kodály traveled into the countryside to collect and research old Hungarian folk melodies. Their growing interest in folk music coincided with a contemporary social interest in traditional national culture. Hungarian folk music had previously been categorised as "Gypsy music". The classic example is Franz Liszt's Hungarian Rhapsodies for piano, which he based on popular art songs performed by Romani bands of the time. In contrast, Bartók and Kodály discovered that the old Hungarian folk melodies were based on pentatonic scales similar to those in Asian folk traditions, such as those of Central Asia, Anatolia and Siberia.

Bartók and Kodály set about incorporating elements of such Hungarian peasant music into their compositions. They both frequently quoted folk song melodies verbatim and wrote pieces derived entirely from authentic songs. An example is Bartok's two volumes entitled For Children for solo piano, containing 80 folk tunes to which he wrote accompaniment. Bartók's style in his art music compositions was a synthesis of folk music, classicism, and modernism. His melodic and harmonic sense was influenced by the folk music of Hungary, Romania, and other nations. He was especially fond of the asymmetrical dance rhythms and pungent harmonies found in Bulgarian music. Most of his early compositions offer a blend of nationalist and late Romantic elements.

=== Middle years and career (1909–1939) ===
==== Personal life ====
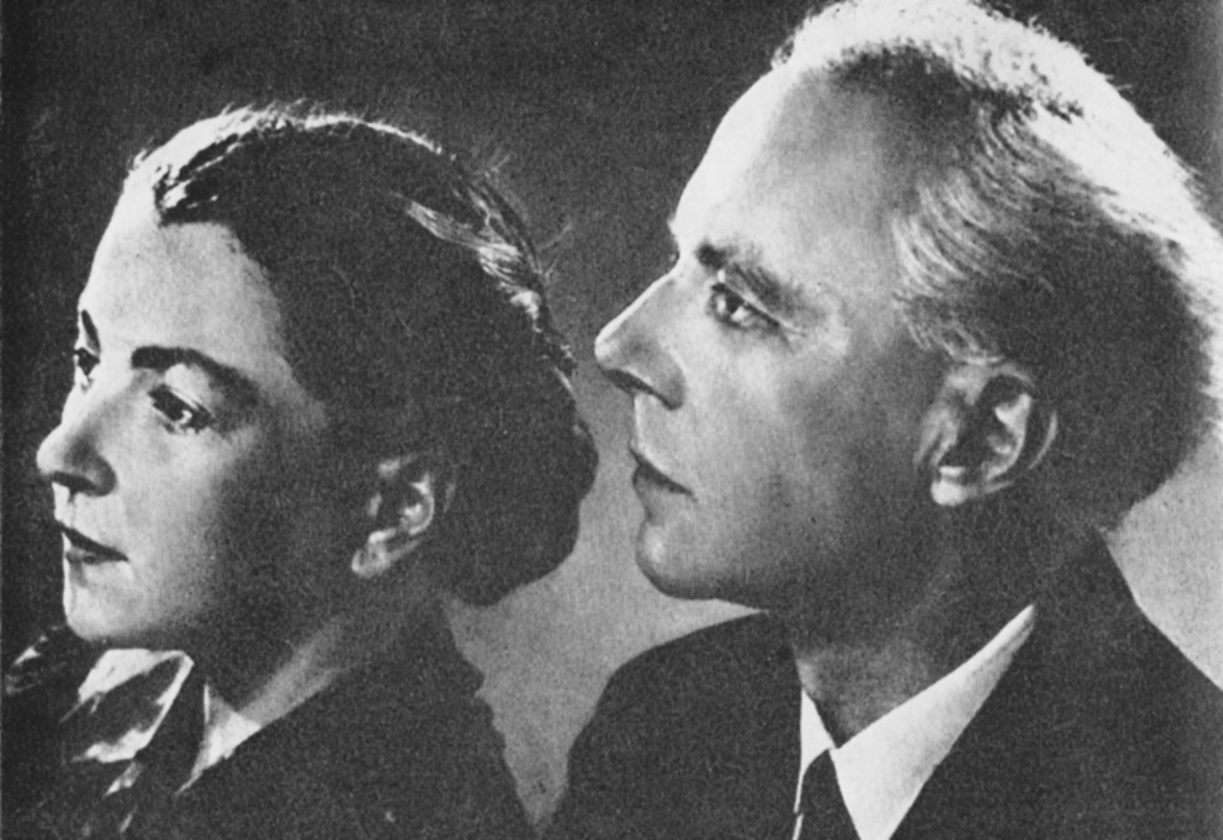
Bartok and his wife Ditta Pásztory

In 1909, at 28, Bartók married Márta Ziegler, aged 16. Their son, Béla Bartók III, was born the next year. After nearly 15 years together, Bartók divorced Márta in June 1923. Two months after his divorce, he married Ditta Pásztory, a piano student, ten days after proposing to her. She was 19, he 42. Their son, Péter, was born in 1924.

Raised as a Catholic, by his early adulthood Bartók had become an atheist. He later became attracted to Unitarianism and converted in 1916. Although Bartók was not conventionally religious, according to his son Béla III, "he was a nature lover: he always mentioned the miraculous order of nature with great reverence". He had a large collection of insects, one of his main interests outside music. Béla III became lay president of the Hungarian Unitarian Church.

==== Opera ====
In 1911, Bartók wrote his only opera, Bluebeard's Castle, dedicated to Márta. In it, he uses symbolism to show parallels between unconscious motivation and fate. The opera suggests that people cannot control their fates. Bartók entered it for a prize by the Hungarian Fine Arts Commission, but they rejected it as unfit for the stage. In 1917 Bartók revised the score for the 1918 première and rewrote the ending. After the 1919 revolution, in which he actively participated, he was pressured by the Horthy regime to remove the name of librettist Béla Balázs from the opera, as Balázs was of Jewish origin, was blacklisted, and had left the country for Vienna. Bluebeard's Castle received only one revival, in 1936, before Bartók emigrated. For the rest of his life, although devoted to Hungary's people and culture, he never felt much loyalty to the government or its official establishments.

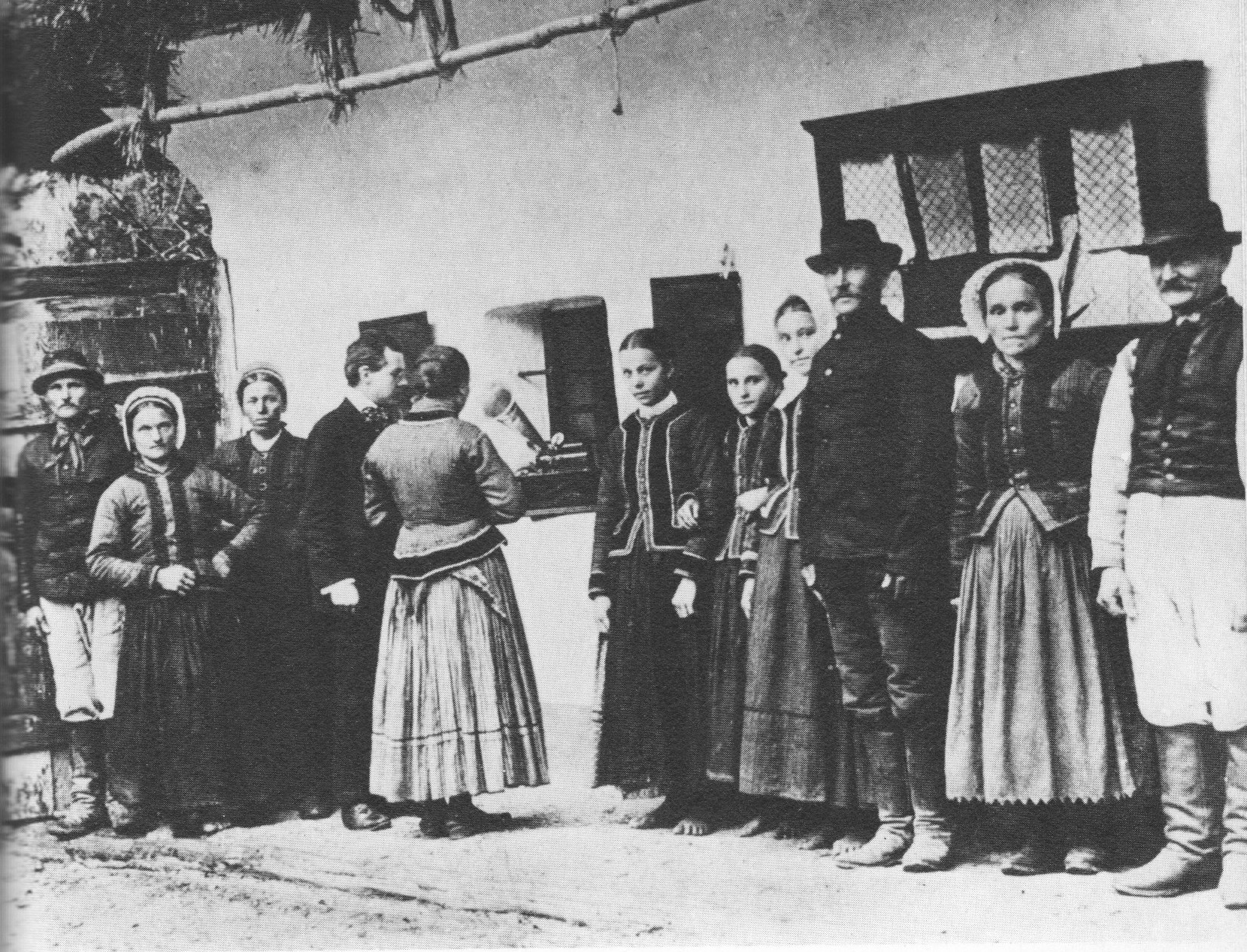
Béla Bartók using a phonograph to record Slovak folk songs sung by peasants in Zobordarázs (Slovak: Dražovce, today part of Nitra, Slovakia)

==== Folk music and composition ====
After his disappointment over the Fine Arts Commission competition, Bartók wrote little for two or three years, concentrating on collecting and arranging folk music. He undertook this task with great skill and persistence; the folk music scholar Charles Seeger called him "one of the greatest field collectors of the first half of the 20th century." Bartók found the phonograph an essential tool for collecting folk music for its accuracy, objectivity, and manipulability. He collected first in the Carpathian Basin (then the Kingdom of Hungary), where he notated Hungarian, Slovak, Romanian, and Bulgarian folk music. A breakthrough arrived when he collaboratively collected folk music with Zoltán Kodály through the medium of a phonomotor, on which they studied classification possibilities (for individual folk songs) and recorded hundreds of cylinders. He also collected in Moldavia, Wallachia, and (in 1913) Algeria. The outbreak of World War I forced him to stop the expeditions, but he returned to composing with his ballet The Wooden Prince (1914–1916) and the String Quartet No. 2 in (1915–1917), both influenced by Debussy.

Bartók's score for The Miraculous Mandarin, another ballet, was influenced by Igor Stravinsky, Arnold Schoenberg and Richard Strauss. Though started in 1918, the story's sexual content kept it from being performed until 1926. He next wrote his two violin sonatas in 1921 and 1922, which are among his most harmonically and structurally complex pieces.

In March 1927, he visited Barcelona and performed the Rhapsody for piano Sz. 26 with the Orquestra Pau Casals at the Gran Teatre del Liceu. During the same stay, he attended a concert by the Cobla Barcelona at the Palau de la Música Catalana. According to the critic Joan Llongueras i Badia, "he was very interested in the sardanas, above all, the freshness, spontaneity and life of our music [...] he wanted to know the mechanism of the tenoras and the tibles, and requested data on the composition of the cobla and extension and characteristics of each instrument".

In 1927–1928, Bartók wrote his Third and Fourth String Quartets, after which his compositions demonstrated his mature style. Notable examples of this period are Music for Strings, Percussion and Celesta (1936) and Divertimento for String Orchestra (1939). The Fifth String Quartet was composed in 1934, and the Sixth String Quartet (his last) in 1939. In 1936 he traveled to Turkey to collect and study Turkish folk music. He worked in collaboration with Turkish composer Ahmet Adnan Saygun mostly around Adana.

=== World War II and final years (1940–1945) ===
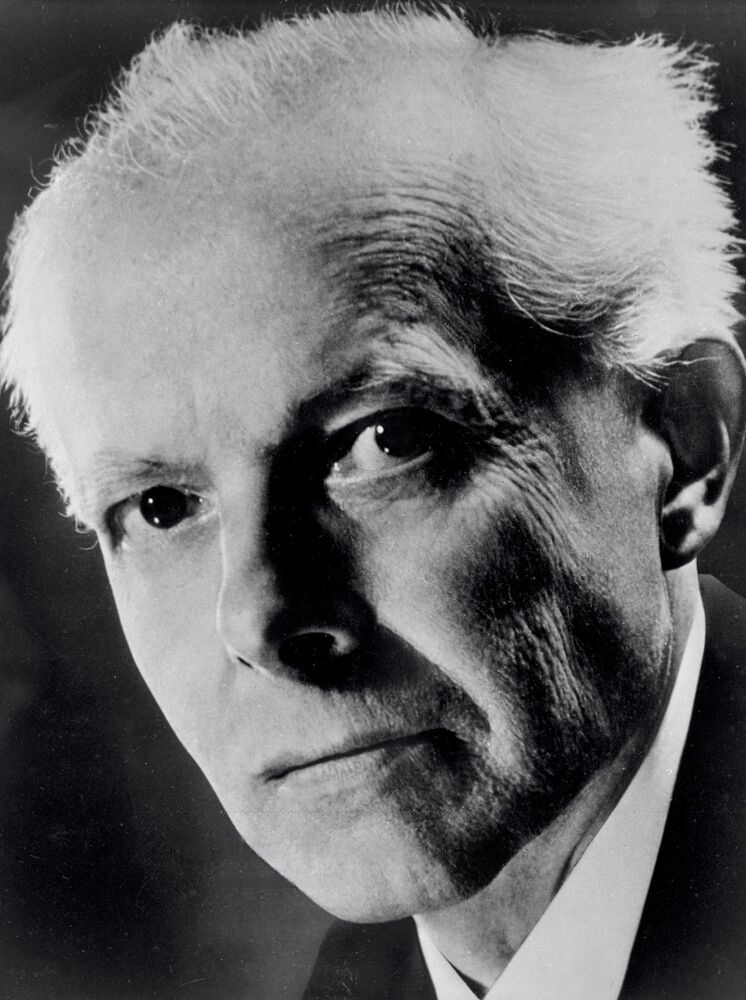
Bartók in 1943

In 1940, as the European political situation worsened after the outbreak of World War II, Bartók was increasingly tempted to flee Hungary. He strongly opposed the Nazi Party and Hungary's alliance with the Axis powers under the Tripartite Pact. After the Nazis came to power in 1933, Bartók refused to give concerts in Germany and broke away from his publisher there. His anti-fascist political views caused trouble with the establishment in Hungary. In his will recorded on 4 October 1940, he requested that no square or street be named after him until Hungarian squares no longer bore the names of Mussolini or Hitler, as they did at the time. Having first sent his manuscripts out of the country, Bartók reluctantly emigrated to the United States with his wife, Ditta, in October 1940. They settled in New York City after arriving on the night of 29–30 October by a steamer from Lisbon. After joining them in 1942, their son Péter enlisted in the United States Navy, serving in the Pacific War and then settling in Florida, where he became a recording engineer. Béla Bartók III remained in Hungary and worked as a railroad official until his retirement in the early 1980s.

Although he became a US citizen in 1945 shortly before his death, Bartók never felt fully at home in the country. He initially found it difficult to compose in his new surroundings. Though well known in America as a pianist, ethnomusicologist, and teacher, he was not well known as a composer, and there was little American interest in his music during his final years. He and Ditta gave some concerts, but demand for them was low. Bartók, who had made some recordings in Hungary, also recorded for Columbia Records after he came to the US; many of these recordings (some with Bartók's own spoken introductions) were later issued on LP and CD.

Bartók was supported by a research fellowship of $3,000 a year from Columbia University for several years. He and Ditta worked on a large collection of Serbian and Croatian folk songs in Columbia's libraries. Bartók's economic difficulties during his first years in America were mitigated by publication royalties, teaching, and performance tours. While his finances were always precarious, he did not live and die in poverty, as he had enough friends and supporters to ensure that there was sufficient money and work available. Bartók was a proud man and did not easily accept charity. Despite being short on cash at times, he often refused money his friends offered him. Although he was not a member of the American Society of Composers, Authors and Publishers, the society paid for his medical care during his last two years, with his reluctant consent. According to Edward Jablonski, "At no time during Bartók's American years did his income amount to less than $4,000 a year".

The first symptoms of his health problems began late in 1940, when his right shoulder began to show signs of stiffening. In 1942, symptoms increased and he started having bouts of fever. Bartók's illness was at first thought to be a recurrence of the tuberculosis he had had as a young man (and one of his doctors in New York was Edgar Mayer, director of Will Rogers Memorial Hospital in the tuberculosis treatment hub of Saranac Lake, New York), but medical examinations found no underlying disease. Finally, in April 1944, leukemia was diagnosed, but by then, little could be done. As his body slowly failed, Bartók found more creative energy and returned to composing, partly thanks to the violinist Joseph Szigeti and the conductor Fritz Reiner, one of his former students. Bartók's last work might well have been the String Quartet No. 6 but for Serge Koussevitzky's commission for the Concerto for Orchestra. Koussevitsky's Boston Symphony Orchestra premiered the Concerto in December 1944 to highly positive reviews, and it quickly became Bartók's most popular work.

In 1944, Bartók was commissioned by Yehudi Menuhin to write a Sonata for Solo Violin. In 1945, Bartók composed his Piano Concerto No. 3, a graceful and almost neo-classical work, as a surprise 42nd birthday present for Ditta, but he died just over a month before her birthday with the orchestration unfinished. He had also worked on a Viola Concerto, but left only the viola part and sketches of the orchestral part complete.

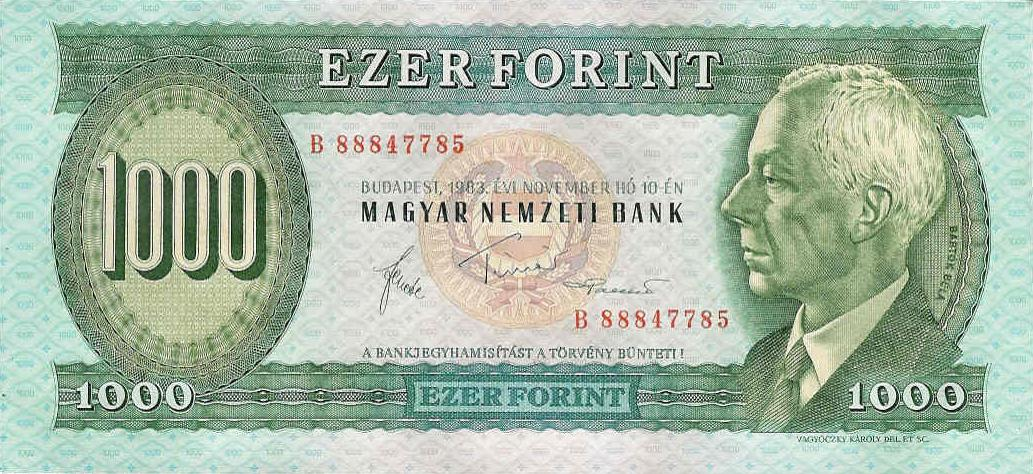
Béla Bartók's portrait on 1000 Hungarian forint banknote (printed between 1983 and 1992; no longer in circulation)

Bartók died on 26 September 1945 in a hospital in New York City from complications of leukemia (specifically, of secondary polycythemia), aged 64. His funeral was attended by only ten people. Aside from his widow and their son, other attendees included György Sándor.

Bartók's body was initially interred in Ferncliff Cemetery in Hartsdale, New York. In 1988, the Hungarian government, along with his two sons, requested that his remains be exhumed and transferred to Budapest for burial. He was re-interred at Budapest's Farkasréti Cemetery after a state funeral on 7 July 1988, next to the remains of Ditta (who died in 1982, one year after what would have been his 100th birthday).

The two unfinished works were completed by his pupil Tibor Serly. Sándor was the soloist in the first performance of the Third Piano Concerto, on 8 February 1946. Ditta Pásztory-Bartók later played and recorded it. The Viola Concerto was revised and published in the 1990s by Bartók's son; this version may be closer to what Bartók intended. Concurrently, Peter Bartók, in association with Argentine musician Nelson Dellamaggiore, worked to reprint and revise past editions of the Third Piano Concerto.

== Music ==
Bartók's music reflects two trends that dramatically changed the sound of music in the 20th century: the breakdown of the diatonic system of harmony that had served composers for the previous 200 years and the revival of nationalism as a source for musical inspiration, a trend that began with Mikhail Glinka and Antonín Dvořák in the last half of the 19th century. In his search for new forms of tonality, Bartók turned to Hungarian folk music, other folk music of the Carpathian Basin, and even that of Algeria and Turkey; in so doing he became influential in that stream of modernism which used indigenous music and techniques.

One characteristic style of music is his "night music", which he used mostly in slow movements of multi-movement ensemble or orchestral compositions in his mature period. It is characterised by "eerie dissonances providing a backdrop to sounds of nature and lonely melodies". An example is the third movement (Adagio) of Music for Strings, Percussion and Celesta. His music can be grouped roughly in accordance with the different periods in his life.

=== Early years (1890–1902) ===
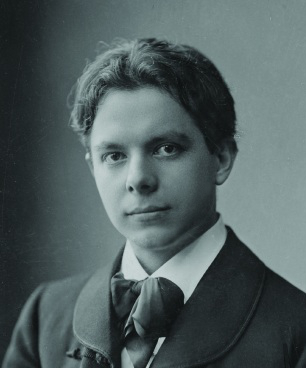
Bartók in 1903

The works of Bartók's youth were written in a classical and early romantic style touched with influences of popular and Romani music. Between 1890 and 1894 (9 to 13 years of age) he wrote 31 piano pieces. Although most of these were simple dance pieces, Bartók began to tackle some more advanced forms, as in his ten-part programmatic A Duna folyása ("The Course of the Danube", 1890–1894), which he played in his first public recital in 1892.

In Catholic grammar school Bartók took to studying the scores of composers "from Bach to Wagner", his compositions then advancing in style and taking on similarities to Schumann and Brahms. Following his matriculation into the Budapest Academy in 1890 he composed very little, though he began to work on exercises in orchestration and familiarized himself thoroughly with the operas of Wagner. In 1902 his creative energies were revitalized by the discovery of the music of Richard Strauss, whose tone poem Also sprach Zarathustra, according to Bartók, "stimulated the greatest enthusiasm in me; at last I saw the way that lay before me". Bartók also owned the score to Ein Heldenleben, which he transcribed for the piano and committed to memory.

=== New influences (1903–1911) ===
Under Strauss's influence, in 1903 Bartók composed Kossuth, a symphonic poem in ten tableaux on the subject of the 1848 Hungarian war of independence, reflecting his growing interest in musical nationalism. A year later he renewed his opus numbers with the Rhapsody for Piano and Orchestra serving as Opus 1. Driven by nationalistic fervor and a desire to transcend the influence of prior composers, Bartók began a lifelong devotion to folk music, sparked by overhearing his nanny Lidi Dósa's singing of Transylvanian folk songs at a Hungarian resort in 1904. He began to collect Magyar peasant melodies, later extending to the folk music of other peoples of the Carpathian Basin, Slovaks, Romanians, Rusyns, Serbs, and Croatians. He used fewer romantic elements in favour of an idiom that embodied folk music as intrinsic and essential to its style. Later in life he commented on the incorporation of folk and art music:

The question is, what are the ways in which peasant music is taken over and becomes transmuted into modern music? We may, for instance, take over a peasant melody unchanged or only slightly varied, write an accompaniment to it and possibly some opening and concluding phrases. This kind of work would show a certain analogy with Bach's treatment of chorales. ... Another method ... is the following: the composer does not make use of a real peasant melody but invents his own imitation of such melodies. There is no true difference between this method and the one described above. ... There is yet a third way ... Neither peasant melodies nor imitations of peasant melodies can be found in his music, but it is pervaded by the atmosphere of peasant music. In this case we may say, he has completely absorbed the idiom of peasant music which has become his musical mother tongue.

Bartók first became acquainted with Debussy's music in 1907 and regarded it highly. In an interview in 1939 Bartók said:

Debussy's great service to music was to reawaken among all musicians an awareness of harmony and its possibilities. In that, he was just as important as Beethoven, who revealed to us the possibilities of progressive form, or as Bach, who showed us the transcendent significance of counterpoint. Now, what I am always asking myself is this: is it possible to make a synthesis of these three great masters, a living synthesis that will be valid for our time?

Debussy's influence is present in the Fourteen Bagatelles (1908). These made Ferruccio Busoni exclaim: "At last something truly new!" Until 1911, Bartók composed widely differing works which ranged from adherence to romantic style, to folk song arrangements and to his modernist opera Bluebeard's Castle. The negative reception of his work led him to focus on folk music research after 1911 and abandon composition with the exception of folk music arrangements.

=== Inspiration and experimentation (1916–1921) ===
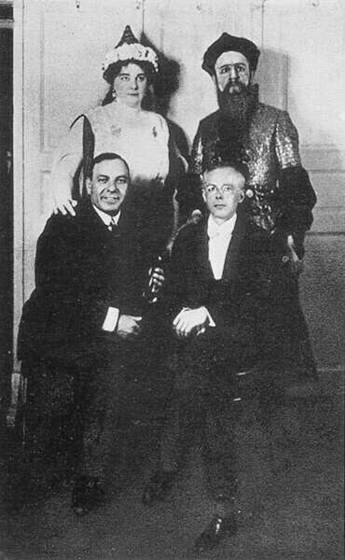
Olga Haselbeck, Oszkár Kálmán (Bluebeard), Dezső Zádor and Béla Bartók after the premiere of Bluebeard's Castle in 1918

His pessimistic attitude toward composing was lifted by the stormy and inspiring contact with Klára Gombossy in the summer of 1915. This episode remained hidden until it was researched by Denijs Dille between 1979 and 1989. Bartók started composing again, including the Suite for piano opus 14 (1916), and The Miraculous Mandarin (1919) and he completed The Wooden Prince (1917).

Bartók felt the result of World War I as a personal tragedy. Many regions he loved were severed from Hungary: Transylvania, the Banat (where he was born), and Bratislava (Pozsony, where his mother had lived). Additionally, the political relations between Hungary and other successor states to the Austro-Hungarian empire prohibited his folk music research outside Hungary. Bartók also wrote Eight Improvisations on Hungarian Peasant Songs in 1920 and the Dance Suite in 1923, the year of his second marriage.

=== "Synthesis of East and West" (1926–1945) ===
In 1926, Bartók needed a significant piece for piano and orchestra with which he could tour in Europe and America. He was particularly inspired by American composer Henry Cowell's controversial use of intense tone clusters on the piano while touring western Europe. Bartók happened to be present at one of these concerts and later requested Cowell's permission to use his technique, which Cowell granted. In preparing to write his first Piano Concerto, he wrote his Sonata, Out of Doors, and Nine Little Pieces, all for solo piano, and all prominently featuring clusters. He increasingly found his own voice. The style of his last period—named "Synthesis of East and West"—is hard to define. In his mature period, Bartók wrote relatively few works but most are large-scale compositions for large settings. Only his voice works have programmatic titles and his late works often adhere to classical forms.

Among Bartók's most important works are the six string quartets (1909, 1917, 1927, 1928, 1934, and 1939), the Cantata Profana (1930), which Bartók called his most personal "credo", the Music for Strings, Percussion and Celesta (1936), the Concerto for Orchestra (1943), and the Third Piano Concerto (1945). He made a lasting contribution to the literature for younger students: for his son Péter's music lessons, he composed Mikrokosmos, a six-volume collection of graded piano pieces.

== Musical analysis ==
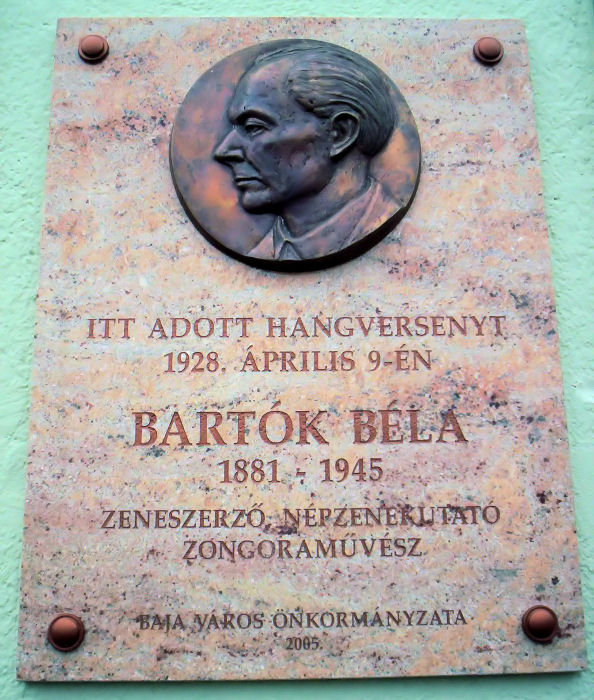
Béla Bartók memorial plaque in Baja, Hungary

Paul Wilson lists as the most prominent characteristics of Bartók's music from the late 1920s onward the influence of the Carpathian basin and European art music, and his changing attitude toward (and use of) tonality, without the traditional harmonic functions associated with major and minor scales.

Although Bartók claimed in his writings that his music was always tonal, he rarely used the chords or scales normally associated with tonality, and so the descriptive resources of tonal theory are of limited use. George Perle (1955) and Elliott Antokoletz (1984) focus on his alternative methods of signaling tonal centers, via axes of inversional symmetry. Others view Bartók's axes of symmetry in terms of atonal analytic protocols. Richard Cohn (1988) argues that inversional symmetry is often a byproduct of another atonal procedure, the formation of chords from transpositionally related dyads. Atonal pitch-class theory also furnishes resources for exploring polymodal chromaticism, projected sets, privileged patterns, and large set types used as source sets such as the equal-tempered 12-tone aggregate, the octatonic scale (and alpha chord), the diatonic and heptatonia secunda seven-note scales, and less often the whole-tone scale and the primary pentatonic collection.

He rarely used the simple aggregate actively to shape musical structure, though there are examples, such as the second theme from the first movement of his Second Violin Concerto, of which he said that he "wanted to show Schoenberg that one can use all twelve tones and still remain tonal". More thoroughly, in the first eight measures of the last movement of his Second Quartet, all notes gradually gather with the twelfth (G♭) sounding for the first time on the last beat of measure 8, marking the end of the first section. The aggregate is partitioned in the opening of the Third String Quartet with C♯–D–D♯–E in the accompaniment while the remaining pitch classes are used in the melody and more often as 7–35 (diatonic or "white-key" collection) and 5–35 (pentatonic or "black-key" collection) such as in no. 6 of the Eight Improvisations. There, the primary theme is on the black keys in the left hand, while the right accompanies with triads from the white keys. In measures 50–51 in the third movement of the Fourth Quartet, the first violin and cello play black-key chords while the second violin and viola play stepwise diatonic lines. On the other hand, from as early as the Suite for piano, Op. 14 (1914), he occasionally employed a form of serialism based on compound interval cycles, some of which are maximally distributed, multi-aggregate cycles. Ernő Lendvai analyses Bartók's works as based on two opposing tonal systems, the acoustic scale and the axis system, as well as using the golden section as a structural principle.

Milton Babbitt, in his 1949 review of Bartók's string quartets, criticized Bartók for using tonality and non-tonal methods unique to each piece. Babbitt wrote, "Bartók's solution was a specific one, it cannot be duplicated". Bartók's use of "two organizational principles"—tonality for large scale relationships and the piece-specific method for moment to moment thematic elements—was a problem for Babbitt, who worried that the "highly attenuated tonality" requires extreme non-harmonic methods to create a feeling of closure.

== Catalogues ==
The cataloguing of Bartók's works is somewhat complex. Bartók assigned opus numbers to his works three times, the last of these series ending with the Sonata for Violin and Piano No. 1, Op. 21 in 1921. He ended this practice because of the difficulty of distinguishing between original works and ethnographic arrangements, and between major and minor works. Since his death, three attempts—two full and one partial—have been made at cataloguing. The first, and still most widely used, is András Szőllősy's chronological Sz. numbers, from 1 to 121. Denijs Dille subsequently reorganised the juvenilia (Sz. 1–25) thematically, as DD numbers 1 to 77. The most recent catalogue is that of László Somfai; this is a chronological index with works identified by BB numbers 1 to 129, incorporating corrections based on the Béla Bartók Thematic Catalogue.

On 1 January 2016, Bartók's works entered the public domain in the European Union.

== Discography ==
Together with his like-minded contemporary Zoltán Kodály, Bartók embarked on an extensive programme of field research to capture the folk and peasant melodies of Magyar, Slovak and Romanian language territories. At first they transcribed the melodies by hand, but later they began to use a phonomotor, a wax cylinder recording machine invented by Thomas Edison. Compilations of Bartók's field recordings, interviews, and original piano playing have been released over the years, largely by the Hungarian record label Hungaroton:

- Bartók, Béla. 1994. Bartók at the Piano. Hungaroton 12326. 6-CD set.
- Bartók, Béla. 1995a. Bartók Plays Bartók – Bartók at the Piano 1929–41. Pearl 9166. CD recording.
- Bartók, Béla. 1995b. Bartók Recordings from Private Collections. Hungaroton 12334. CD recording.
- Bartók, Béla. 2003. Bartók Plays Bartók. Pearl 179. CD recording.
- Bartók, Béla. 2003. Bartók Sonata for 2 Pianos & Percussion, Suite for 2 Pianos. Apex 0927-49569-2. CD recording.
- Bartók, Béla. 2007. Bartók: Contrasts, Mikrokosmos. Membran/Documents 223546. CD recording.
- Bartók, Béla. 2008. Bartók Plays Bartók. Urania 340. CD recording.
- Bartók, Béla. 2016. Bartók the Pianist. Hungaroton HCD32790-91. Two CDs. Works by Bartók, Domenico Scarlatti, Zoltán Kodály, and Franz Liszt.

A compilation of field recordings and transcriptions for two violas was also recently released by Tantara Records in 2014.

On 18 March 2016 Decca Classics released Béla Bartók: The Complete Works, the first ever complete compilation of all of Bartók's compositions, including new recordings of never-before-recorded early piano and vocal works. However, none of the composer's own performances are included in this 32-disc set.

== Statues and other memorials ==
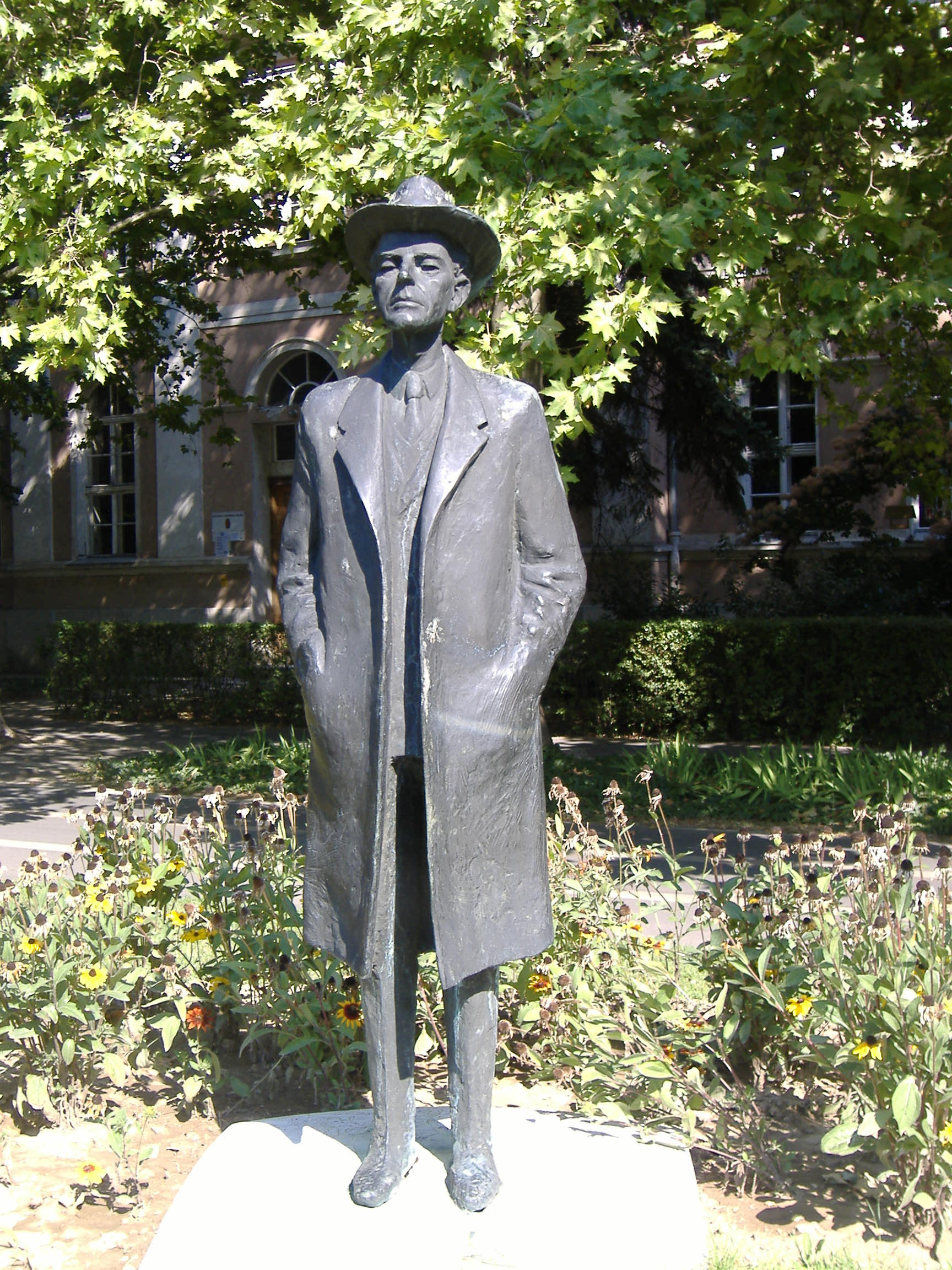
Statue of Bartók in Makó, Hungary

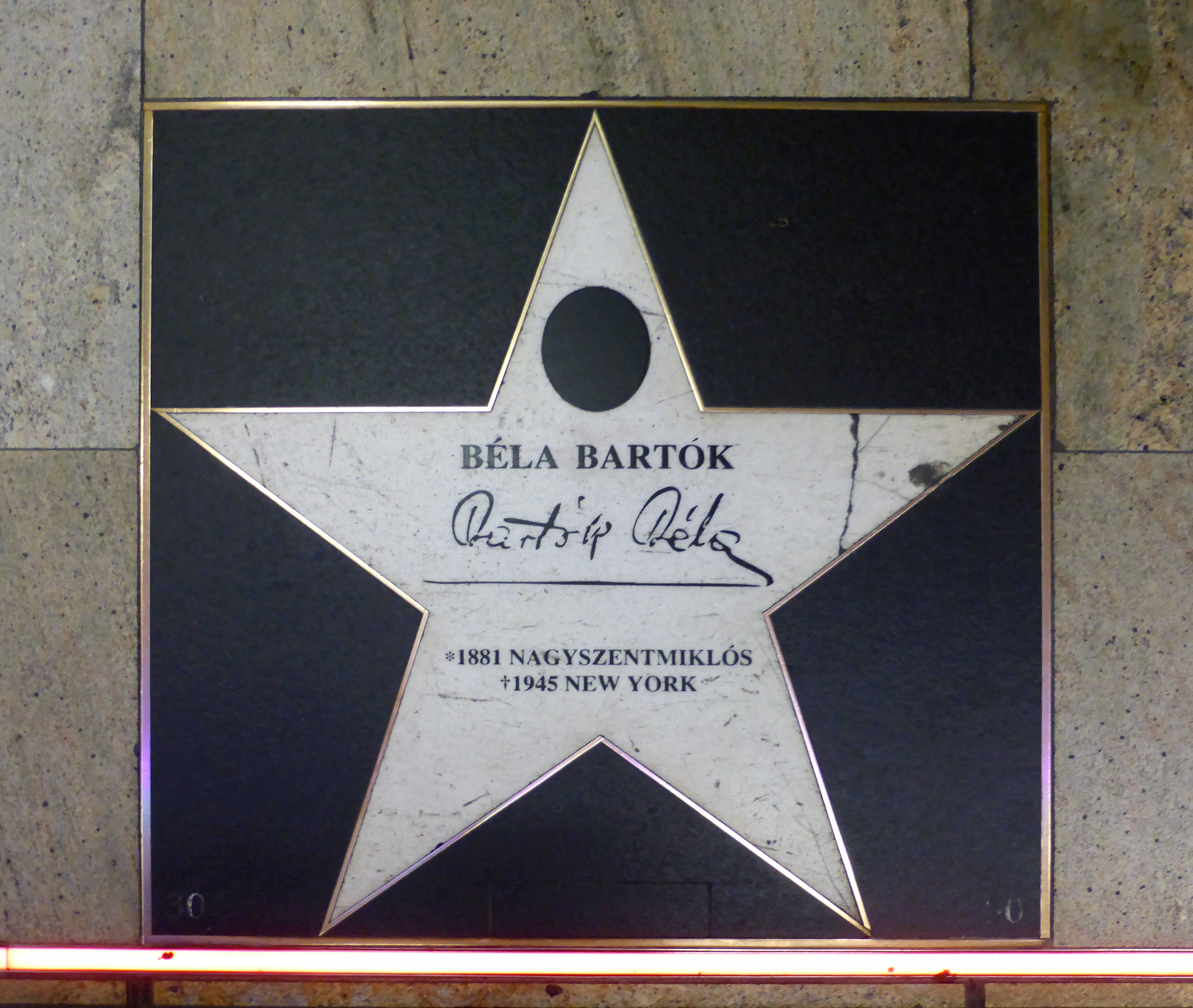
Walk of Fame, Vienna

- A statue of Bartók stands in Brussels, Belgium, near the central train station in a public square, Spanjeplein-Place d'Espagne.
- A statue stands outside Malvern Court, London, south of the South Kensington tube station, and just north of Sydney Place. An English Heritage blue plaque, unveiled in 1997, commemorates Bartók at 7 Sydney Place, where he stayed when performing in London.
- A statue of him was installed in front of the house in which Bartók spent his last eight years in Hungary, at Csalán út 29, in the hills above Budapest. It is now operated as the Béla Bartók Memorial House (Bartók Béla Emlékház). Copies of this statue also stand in Makó (the closest Hungarian city to his birthplace, which is now in Romania), Paris, London and Toronto.
- A bust and plaque at his last residence, in New York City at 309 W. 57th Street, inscribed: "The Great Hungarian Composer / Béla Bartók / (1881–1945) / Made His Home In This House / During the Last Year of His Life".
- A bust of him is in the front yard of Ankara State Conservatory in Ankara, Turkey, next to a bust of Ahmet Adnan Saygun.
- In 1999, Bartók was inducted into the American Classical Musical Hall of Fame.
- A bronze statue of Bartók, sculpted by Imre Varga in 2005, stands in the front lobby of The Royal Conservatory of Music in Toronto.
- A bronze bust of Bartók stands in the Anton Scudier Central Park in Timișoara, Romania. This park has an "Alley of Personalities", set up in 2009 and featuring busts of famous "Romanians". Sânnicolau Mare (Nagyszentmiklós in Hungarian), the small town where Bartók was born in 1881, is 58 kilometres northwest of Timișoara, and is just inside Romania today, near the border with Hungary.
- A statue of Bartók sculpted by Imre Varga stands near the river Seine in the public park at Square Béla-Bartók in Paris. In the same park is a sculptural transcription of Bartók's research on tonal harmony, the fountain/sculpture Cristaux, designed by Jean-Yves Lechevallier in 1980.
- An expressionist sculpture by Hungarian sculptor András Beck in Square Henri-Collet, Paris.
- A statue of him also stands in the city centre of Târgu Mureș, Romania.
- A statue (seated) of Bartók is in front of Nákó Castle, in his hometown, Nagyszentmiklós.
- Bartók has a star on the Walk of Fame on Karlsplatz-Passage in Vienna.
- A bronze bust of Bartók donated by the Hungarian-Canadian people of British Columbia stands in the lobby of the University of British Columbia's School of Music.
