= Bluebeard's Castle =

1918 opera by Béla Bartók

- Opera by Béla Bartók
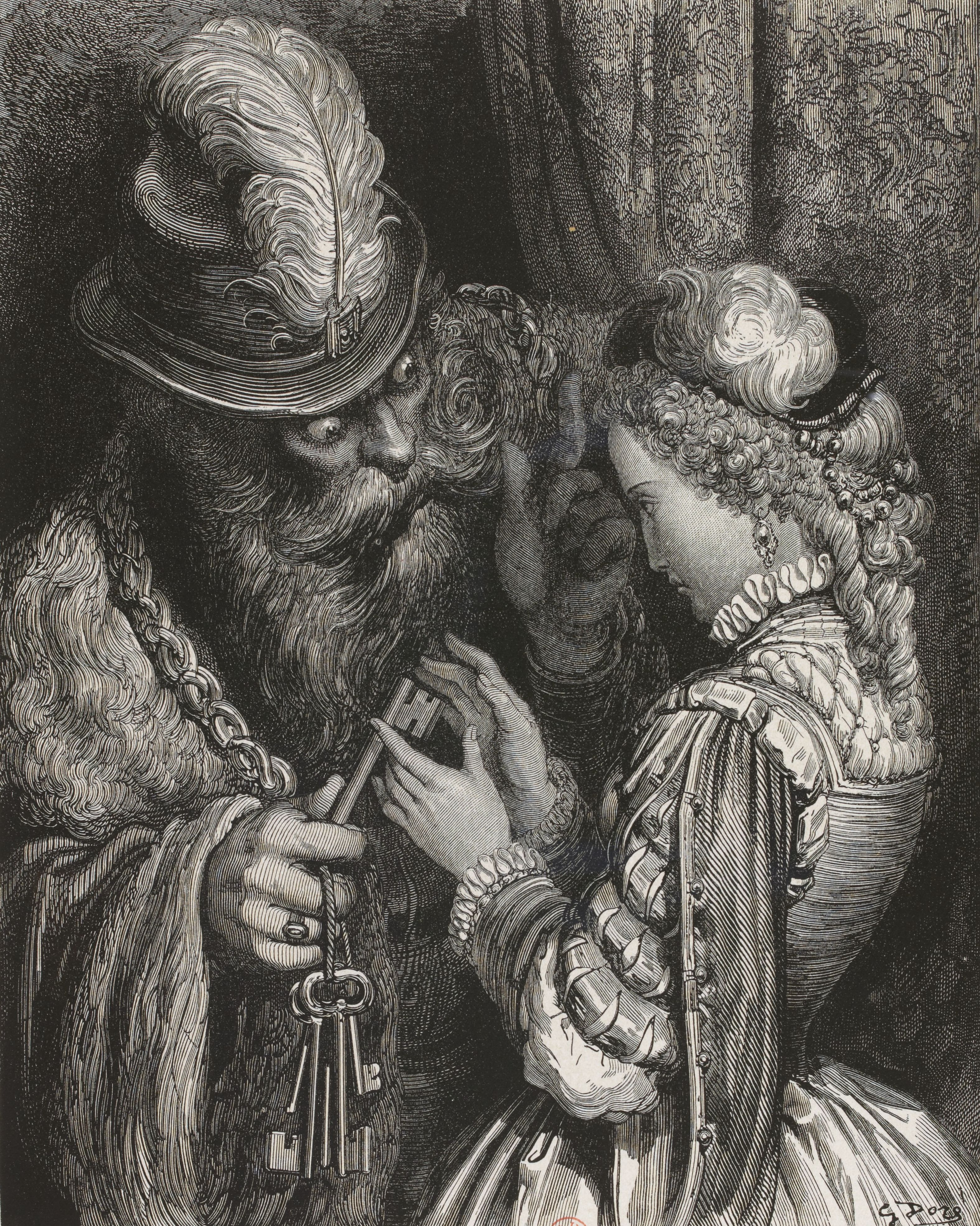
- Bluebeard and his wife in an illustration by Gustave Doré for Perrault's tale
- Native title: Hungarian: A kékszakállú herceg vára
- Librettist: Béla Balázs
- Language: Hungarian
- Based on: La Barbe bleue by Charles Perrault
- Premiere: 24 May 1918; Royal Hungarian Opera House, Budapest

Duke Bluebeard's Castle (Hungarian: A kékszakállú herceg vára, literally The Blue-Bearded Duke's Castle) is a one-act Symbolist opera by Béla Bartók to a Hungarian libretto by poet Béla Balázs. Bartók's only opera, it is based on the French folk legend, or conte populaire, as told by Charles Perrault. It lasts about an hour and has two singing characters: Bluebeard (Kékszakállú) and his newest wife, Judith (Judit); the two have just eloped and she is coming home to his castle for the first time.

Bluebeard's Castle, Sz. 48, was composed in 1911 (with modifications made in 1912 and a new ending added in 1917) and first performed on 24 May 1918 at the Royal Hungarian Opera House in Budapest. Universal Edition published the vocal (1921) and full score (1925). The Boosey & Hawkes full score includes only the German and English singing translations while the Dover edition reproduces the Universal Edition Hungarian/German vocal score (with page numbers beginning at 1 instead of 5). A revision of the UE vocal score in 1963 added a new German translation by Wilhelm Ziegler, but seems not to have corrected any errata. Universal Edition and Bartók Records published another edition of the work in 2005 with a new English translation by Péter Bartók, accompanied by an extensive errata list.

== Composition history ==
Balázs originally conceived the libretto for his roommate Zoltán Kodály in 1908, and wrote it during the following two years. It was first published serially in 1910 with a joint dedication to Kodály and Bartók, and in 1912 appeared with the prologue in the collection "Mysteries". Bartók was motivated to complete the opera in 1911 by the closing date of the Ferenc Erkel Prize competition, in which it was duly entered. A second competition, organised by the music publishers Rózsavölgyi and with a closing date in 1912, encouraged Bartók to make some modifications to the work.

Little is known about the Ferenc Erkel Prize other than that Bluebeard's Castle did not win. The Rózsavölgyi judges, after reviewing the composition, decided that the work (with only two characters and a single location) was not dramatic enough to be considered in the category for which it was entered: theatrical music. It is thought that the panel of judges who were to look at the musical (rather than the theatrical) aspects of the competition entries never saw Bartók's entry.

In 1913 Balázs produced a spoken performance at which Bartók played some piano pieces on a separate part of the program. A 1915 letter to Bartók's wife, Márta (to whom he dedicated the opera), ends: "Now I know that I will never hear it in this life. You asked me to play it for you—I am afraid I would not be able to get through it. Still I'll try so that we may mourn it together."

== Performance history ==
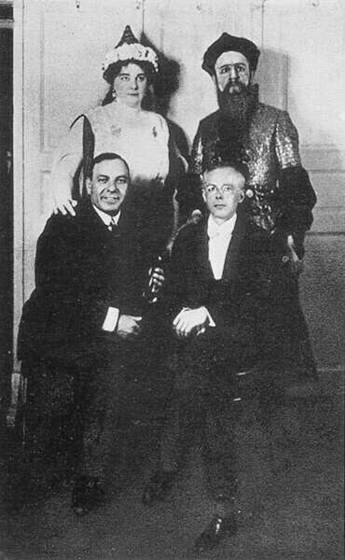
Olga Haselbeck, Oszkár Kálmán (Bluebeard), Dezső Zádor and Béla Bartók after the premiere in 1918

The success of the ballet The Wooden Prince in 1917 paved the way for the May 1918 première with the same conductor, Egisto Tango. Oszkár Kálmán was the first Bluebeard and Olga Haselbeck the first Judith. Following Balázs's exile in 1919 and the ban on his work there were no revivals until 1936. Bartók attended rehearsals and reportedly sided with the new Bluebeard, Mihály Székely, over the new conductor Sergio Failoni, who was insisting on fidelity to the printed score.

Productions in Germany followed at Oper Frankfurt (1922) and in Berlin (1929).

Bluebeard's Castle was first performed in Italy at the Maggio Musicale Fiorentino on 5 May 1938. The production was conducted by Sergio Failoni and starred Mihály Székely in the title role and Ella Némethy as Judith. The Teatro di San Carlo mounted the opera for the first time under Ferenc Fricsay on 19 April 1951 with Mario Petri and Ira Malaniuk. The work's La Scala debut occurred on 28 January 1954 with Petri and Dorothy Dow. This was followed by several other productions at major opera houses in Italy, including the Teatro Regio di Torino (1961), Teatro dell'Opera di Roma (1962), Teatro Comunale di Bologna (1966), La Fenice (1967), and the Teatro Regio di Parma (1970).

The first American performance was by the Dallas Symphony Orchestra broadcast on NBC Radio's Orchestras of the Nation on 9 January 1949, followed by a concert performance at the Music Hall at Fair Park in Dallas, Texas, on 10 January. Both performances were led by conductor Antal Doráti, a former Bartók student. Other sources mention a 1946 concert performance in Dallas. The first fully staged American production was at the New York City Opera on 2 October 1952 with conductor Joseph Rosenstock and singers James Pease and Catherine Ayres. The Metropolitan Opera mounted the opera for the first time on 10 June 1974 with conductor Sixten Ehrling and singers David Ward and Shirley Verrett.

The South American premiere was in Buenos Aires's Teatro Colón, 23 September 1953 conducted by Karl Böhm.

Bluebeard's Castle received its French premiere on 17 April 1950 in a radio broadcast on Radiodiffusion-Télévision Française. Ernest Ansermet conducted the performance, which featured Renée Gilly as Judith and Lucien Lovano as Bluebeard. The first staged production of the work in France was at the Opéra national du Rhin on 29 April 1954 with Heinz Rehfuss in the title role, Elsa Cavelti as Judith, and conductor Ernest Bour. The first performance in Paris was at the Opéra-Comique on 8 October 1959 with soprano Berthe Monmart and bass Xavier Depraz. The production was directed by Marcel Lamy and used a French translation by Michel-Dimitri Calvocoressi.

The London première took place on 16 January 1957 at the Rudolf Steiner Theatre during the English tour of Scottish composer Erik Chisholm directing the University of Cape Town Opera Company whose Désirée Talbot was Judith. A few years earlier, Chisholm had premièred this work in South Africa at the Little Theatre in Cape Town.

The work was first performed in Japan on 29 April 1954 by the Youth Group of the Fujiwara Opera Company (under conductor Yoichiro Fukunaga with piano accompaniment). The opera was presented with full orchestra in the 348th regular concert of the NHK Symphony Orchestra on 16 March 1957.

The opera's Austrian premiere took place at the Salzburg Festival on 4 August 1978 with conductor George Alexander Albrecht, Walter Berry and Katalin Kasza.

In Israel, the opera premiered on 15 December 2010 at the New Israeli Opera in Tel Aviv. Vladimir Braun was Bluebeard and Svetlana Sandler sang Judith. Shirit Lee Weiss directed and Ilan Volkov conducted. The sets, originally used in the Seattle Symphony's 2007 performance were designed by glass artist Dale Chihuly.

In 1988 the BBC broadcast an adaptation of the opera as Duke Bluebeard's Castle directed by Leslie Megahey. It starred Robert Lloyd as Bluebeard and Elizabeth Laurence as Judith.

The Taiwanese premiere, directed and conducted by Tseng Dau-Hsiong, took place in the National Theater in Taipei on 30 December 2011. In January 2015, the Metropolitan Opera presented its first production of Bluebeard's Castle in the original Hungarian, starring Mikhail Petrenko as Bluebeard and Nadja Michael as Judith. In 2022 the Teatro Colón of Buenos Aires broadcast a staging directed by Sophie Hunter.

In 2020, the Bavarian State Opera presented a staging of Bluebeard's Castle by Katie Mitchell into a work titled Judith. The opera was preceded by a film that sets up the revised drama, using Bartok's Concerto for Orchestra as the audio backdrop; Judith is a police detective and expert in undercover work, and instead of becoming Bluebeard's next victim, she frees the three previous wives and kills the perpetrator. The interpretation, with singers John Lundgren and Nina Stemme and conducted by Oksana Lyniv, received positive reception.

== Roles ==
Roles, voice types, premiere cast
Role	Voice type	Premiere cast, 24 May 1918 Conductor: Egisto Tango
Prologue of the Bard	spoken	
Bluebeard	bass or bass-baritone	Oszkár Kálmán
Judith	soprano or mezzo-soprano	Olga Haselbeck
Bluebeard's wives	silent	

Bartók includes the Castle on the dramatis personæ page.

== Synopsis ==
Place: A huge, dark hall in a castle, with seven locked doors.
Time: Not defined.

Judith and Bluebeard arrive at his castle, which is all dark. Bluebeard asks Judith whether she wants to stay and offers her an opportunity to leave, but she decides to stay. Judith insists that all the doors be opened, to allow light to enter into the forbidding interior, saying her demands are based on her love for Bluebeard. Bluebeard refuses, saying that there are private places not to be explored by others, and asking Judith to love him but ask no questions. Judith persists and eventually prevails over his resistance.

The first door opens to reveal a torture chamber, stained with blood. Repelled but intrigued, Judith pushes on. Behind the second door is a storehouse of weapons, and behind the third a storehouse of riches. Bluebeard urges her on. Behind the fourth door is a secret garden of great beauty; behind the fifth, a window onto Bluebeard's vast kingdom. All is now sunlit, but blood has stained the riches, watered the garden, and grim clouds throw blood-red shadows over Bluebeard's kingdom.

Bluebeard pleads with her to stop: the castle is as bright as it can get, and will not get any brighter, but Judith refuses to be stopped after coming this far, and opens the sixth door as a shadow passes over the castle. This is the first room that has not been somehow stained with blood; a silent silvery lake is all that lies within, "a lake of tears". Bluebeard begs Judith to simply love him and ask no more questions. The last door must be shut forever. But she persists, asking him about his former wives, and then accusing him of having murdered them, suggesting that their blood was the blood everywhere, that their tears were those that filled the lake, and that their bodies lie behind the last door. At this, Bluebeard hands over the last key.

Behind the door are Bluebeard's three former wives, alive and dressed in crowns and jewellery. They emerge silently, and Bluebeard, overcome with emotion, prostrates himself before them and praises each in turn (as his wives of dawn, midday and dusk), finally turning to Judith and praising her as his fourth wife (of the night). She is horrified and begs him to stop, but it is too late. He dresses her in the jewellery they wear, which she finds exceedingly heavy. Her head drooping under the weight, she follows the other wives along a beam of moonlight through the seventh door. It closes behind her, and Bluebeard is left alone as all fades to total darkness.

== Symbolism ==
The Hungarian conductor István Kertész believed that we should not relate this to the fairy tale on which it was based, but that Bluebeard was Bartók himself, and that it portrays his personal suffering and reluctance to reveal his inner secrets, which are progressively invaded by Judith. In this way he can be seen as Everyman, although Bartók was an intensely private man. Here the blood that pervades the story symbolizes his suffering. The Prologue (often omitted) points to the story that is portrayed as occurring in the audience's imagination. Kertész felt Judith is a villain in this sense, but Christa Ludwig, who sang the role, disagreed, saying she only voices what she has heard about Bluebeard. She refers repeatedly to the rumours (hír), Jaj, igaz hír; suttogó hír (Ah, truthful whispered rumours). Ludwig also believed that Judith was telling the truth every time she says to him, Szeretlek! (I love you!).

Another Judith, Nadja Michael, had a somewhat different, more symbolic interpretation. In a broadcast from the Metropolitan Opera on 14 February 2015, she said it does not matter who Judith is; she symbolizes a human being who must face the fears that she brings from her past.

== Staging ==
Traditionally, the set is a single dark hall surrounded by the seven doors around the perimeter. As each door is opened, a stream of symbolically colored light comes forth (except in the case of the sixth door, for which the hall is actually darkened). The symbolic colors of the seven doors are as follows:

1. (The torture chamber) Blood-red
2. (The armory) Yellowish-red
3. (The treasury) Golden
4. (The garden) Bluish-green
5. (The kingdom) White (the stage directions read: "in a gleaming torrent, the light streams in", "blue mountains")
6. (The pool of tears) Darkness; the main hall is darkened, as if a shadow had passed over
7. (The wives) Silvery (stage directions: "silver like the moon")

The slow orchestral introduction to the work is preceded by a spoken prologue, also by Balázs, published as "Prologue of the Bard" independently of the play. This poses to the audience the questions "Where is the stage? Is it outside, or inside?" as well as offering a warning to pay careful attention to the events about to unfold. The prologue warns the audience that the morals of the tale can apply to the real world as well as to that of Bluebeard and Judith. The character of the bard ("regős" in Hungarian) is traditional in Hungarian folk music, and the words of the prologue (notably its opening lines "Haj, regő, rejtem") are associated with traditional Hungarian "regősénekek" (Regős songs), which Bartók had studied. The prologue is frequently omitted from performances.

The stage directions call also for occasional ghostly sighs that seemingly emanate from the castle itself when some of the doors are opened. Productions implement these in different ways, sometimes instrumentally, sometimes vocally.

== Music and instrumentation ==
The most salient characteristic of the music from Bluebeard's Castle is the importance of the minor second, an interval whose dissonance is used repeatedly in both slow and fast passages to evoke aching sadness/disquiet or danger/shock respectively. The minor second is called the 'blood' motif, used whenever Judith notices blood in the castle. Overall the music is not atonal, although it is often polytonal, with more than one key center operating simultaneously (e.g. the leadup to the climactic opening of the fifth door). In some passages (for example, door 3) the music is tonal and mostly consonant. Many critics have found an overall key plan, as one would in a tonal piece. The opera starts in a mode of F♯, modulating towards C in the middle of the piece (tonally, the greatest possible distance from F♯), before returning to F♯ toward the end. The text and setting at these points have suggested to some that the F♯-C dichotomy represents darkness/light.

The vocal parts are very challenging due to the highly chromatic and speech-rhythm-inflected style. For non-native speakers, the Hungarian-language libretto can be difficult to master. These reasons, coupled with the static effect of the stage action, combine to make staged performances of the opera a comparative rarity; it more often appears in concert form.

To support the psychological undertones, Bartók calls for a large orchestra. The instrumentation is:

4 flutes (3rd and 4th doubling two piccolos), 2 oboes, cor anglais, 3 clarinets in A and B♭ (1st and 2nd doubling two E♭ clarinets, 3rd doubling bass clarinet), 4 bassoons (4th doubling contrabassoon), 4 horns, 4 trumpets in B♭, 4 trombones, tuba, timpani, bass drum, side drum, tamtam, cymbals, suspended cymbals, xylophone (originally a keyboard xylophone – now usually played by two players), triangle, 2 harps, celesta, organ, and strings.

In addition, Bartók calls for Musica di scena ('Stage music') of an extra 4 trumpets and 4 alto trombones.

== Translations ==
The original German translation by Wilhelm Ziegler appears in the 1921 first edition of the vocal score. In 1963 a revised singing translation by Wilhelm Ziegler replaced it. The English translation printed in the 1963 miniature score is by Christopher Hassall. The one in the full score is by Chester Kallman. Another singing translation is by John Lloyd Davies, made for the Scottish Opera in 1989 (in British National Opera Guide No. 44, 1991). A reasonably faithful version in French is that of Natalia and Charles Zaremba (L'Avant-scène opéra, 1992).

In 2023, Bluebeard's Castle was staged in Ukrainian translation in Kyiv, but the translator's name is unknown.

== Film adaptation ==
Herzog Blaubarts Burg, a 1963 film version directed by Michael Powell, sung in German.

== Recordings ==
Year	Cast (Bluebeard, Judith)	Conductor, Opera house and orchestra	Label
1936	Mihály Székely, Ella Némethy	Sergio Failoni, Orchestra Opera Budapest	CD: Grandi Maestri alla Scala MC 2015
1951	Mihály Székely, Klára Palánkay	Georges Sébastian, Budapest Radio Orchestra	CD: Arlecchino; Cat: ARL109
1953	Bernhard Sonnerstedt, Birgit Nilsson	Ferenc Fricsay, Swedish Radio Orchestra (Live recording)	CD: Opera d'oro (sung in German)
1955	Endre Koréh, Judith Hellwig	Walter Susskind, New Orchestra of London	LP: Bartók Records
1956	Mihály Székely, Klára Palánkay	János Ferencsik, Budapest Philharmonic Orchestra	LP: Hungaroton
1958	Dietrich Fischer-Dieskau, Hertha Töpper	Ferenc Fricsay, Deutsches Symphonie-Orchester Berlin	CD: Deutsche Grammophon (sung in German)
1962	Jerome Hines, Rosalind Elias	Eugene Ormandy, Philadelphia Orchestra	LP: Sony (sung in English)
1962	Mihály Székely, Olga Szőnyi	Antal Doráti, London Symphony Orchestra	LP: Philips Records
1965	Walter Berry, Christa Ludwig	István Kertész, London Symphony Orchestra	CD: Decca Records
1973	Yevgeny Kibkalo, Nina Poliakova	Gennady Rozhdestvensky, Orchestra of the Bolshoi Theatre	LP: Westminster Records (sung in Russian)
1976	Siegmund Nimsgern, Tatiana Troyanos	Pierre Boulez, BBC Symphony Orchestra	CD: Sony
1976	Kolos Kováts, Eszter Kovács	János Ferencsik, Hungarian State Orchestra	CD: Art 21 Stúdió; Cat: Art-21 002
1979	Kolos Kováts, Sylvia Sass	Georg Solti, London Philharmonic Orchestra	CD: Decca Records
1979	Dietrich Fischer-Dieskau, Júlia Várady	Wolfgang Sawallisch, Bavarian State Orchestra	CD: Deutsche Grammophon
1981	Yevgeny Nesterenko, Elena Obraztsova	János Ferencsik, Orchestra of the Hungarian State Opera	CD: Hungaroton
1987	Samuel Ramey, Éva Marton	Ádám Fischer, Orchestra of the Hungarian State Opera	CD: Sony
1988	Robert Lloyd, Elizabeth Laurence	Ádám Fischer, London Philharmonic Orchestra	Film: BBC; DVD:
1989	Samuel Ramey, Jessye Norman	James Levine, The Metropolitan Opera Orchestra (Recorded live; staged by Göran Järvefelt)	Streaming video: Met Opera on Demand
1992	Gwynne Howell, Sally Burgess	Mark Elder, BBC National Orchestra of Wales (Live recording)	CD: BBC MM114 (sung in English)
1996	John Tomlinson, Anne Sofie von Otter	Bernard Haitink, Berlin Philharmonic	CD: EMI Classics
1999	László Polgár, Jessye Norman	Pierre Boulez, Chicago Symphony Orchestra (Winner, Grammy Award for Best Opera Recording, 1999)	CD: Deutsche Grammophon
2000	György Melis, Katalin Kasza	János Ferencsik, Budapest Philharmonic Orchestra	CD: Hungaroton HCD 11486
2002	Peter Fried, Cornelia Kallisch	Péter Eötvös, Radio Sinfonieorchester Stuttgart SWR (Live recording; Grammy Nomination 2003)	CD: Hänssler; Cat: 93070
2002	László Polgár, Ildikó Komlósi	Iván Fischer, Budapest Festival Orchestra	CD: Philips; SACD: Channel Classics Records
2006	Sally Burgess; Sir John Tomlinson	Opera North Orchestra; Richard Farnes	CD: Chandos Opera in English CHAN3133
2007	Gustáv Beláček, Andrea Meláth	Marin Alsop, Bournemouth Symphony Orchestra	CD: Naxos
2009	Sir Willard White, Elena Zhidkova	Valery Gergiev, London Symphony Orchestra	CD: LSO Live
2014	Sir John Tomlinson; Michelle DeYoung	Philharmonia Orchestra; Esa-Pekka Salonen	CD: Philharmonia Orchestra SIGCD372
2015	Mikhail Petrenko; Nadja Michael	Valery Gergiev, Metropolitan Opera (Production: Mariusz Trelinski; recorded live, 14 February)	HD video: Met Opera on Demand
2015	John Relyea, Ekaterina Gubanova	Esa-Pekka Salonen, Opéra national de Paris (Stage director: Krzysztof Warlikowski; Director: Stéphane Lissner; recorded live, Palais Garnier, December 2015)	Blu-ray: Arthaus Musik
2018	Krisztián Cser; Andrea Meláth	Gábor Hollerung; Dohnányi Orchestra Budafok	CD: Hunnia Records HRCD 1733
2019	Michelle DeYoung; John Relyea	Edward Gardner; Bergen Philharmonic Orchestra	CD: Chandos CHSA5237
2021	Szilvia Vörös; Mika Kares	Susanna Mälkki; Helsinki Philharmonic Orchestra	CD: BIS-2388 SACD

== Bibliography ==
- Honti, Rita. "Principles of Pitch Organization in Bartók's Duke Bluebeard's Castle". Studia musicologica Universitatis Helsingiensis, 14 [13]. Diss. Helsinki University, Helsinki. 2006. ISBN 952-10-3331-2 (2nd ed. 2007.)
- Smith, Erik. 1965. A discussion between István Kertész and the producer. DECCA Records (liner notes for Bluebeard's Castle).
