= The Miraculous Mandarin =

1924 ballet by Béla Bartók

A csodálatos mandarin The Miraculous Mandarin
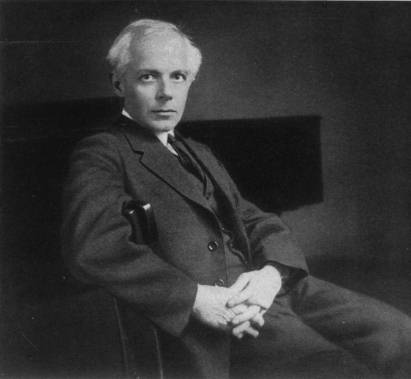
- Béla Bartók in 1927
- Music: Béla Bartók
- Based on: 1916 story by Melchior Lengyel
- Premiere: 27 November 1926; Cologne Opera

The Miraculous Mandarin (Hungarian: A csodálatos mandarin, pronounced [ˈɒ ˈt͡ʃodaːlɒtoʃ ˈmɒndɒrin]; German: Der wunderbare Mandarin) Op. 19, Sz. 73 (BB 82), is a one act pantomime ballet composed by Béla Bartók between 1918 and 1924, and based on the 1916 story by Melchior Lengyel. Premiered on 27 November 1926 conducted by Eugen Szenkar at the Cologne Opera, Germany, it caused a scandal and was subsequently banned on moral grounds. Although more successful at its Prague premiere, it was generally performed during the rest of Bartók's life in the form of a concert suite, which preserves about two-thirds of the original pantomime's music.

== Synopsis ==
1. Beginning—Curtain rises
2. First seduction game
3. Second seduction game
4. Third seduction game—the Mandarin enters
5. Dance of the girl
6. The chase—the tramps leap out
7. Suddenly the Mandarin's head appears
8. The Mandarin falls to the floor

After an orchestral introduction depicting the chaos of the big city, the action begins in a room belonging to three tramps. They search their pockets and drawers for money, but find none. They then force a girl to stand by the window and attract passing men into the room. The girl begins a lockspiel—a "decoy game", or saucy dance. She first attracts a shabby old rake, who makes comical romantic gestures. The girl asks, "Got any money?" He replies, "Who needs money? All that matters is love." He begins to pursue the girl, growing more and more insistent until the tramps seize him and throw him out.

The girl goes back to the window and performs a second lockspiel. This time, she attracts a shy young man, who also has no money. He begins to dance with the girl. The dance grows more passionate, then the tramps jump him and throw him out too.

The girl goes to the window again and begins her dance. The tramps and girl see a bizarre figure in the street, soon heard coming up the stairs. The tramps hide, and the figure, a mandarin (wealthy Chinese man), stands immobile in the doorway. The tramps urge the girl to lure him closer. She begins another saucy dance, the Mandarin's passions slowly rising. Suddenly, he leaps up and embraces the girl. They struggle and she escapes; he begins to chase her. The tramps leap on him, strip him of his valuables, and attempt to suffocate him under pillows and blankets. However, he continues to stare at the girl. They stab him three times with a rusty sword; he almost falls, but throws himself again at the girl. The tramps grab him again and hang him from a lamp hook. The lamp falls, plunging the room into darkness, and the Mandarin's body begins to glow with an eerie blue-green light. The tramps and girl are terrified. Suddenly, the girl knows what they must do. She tells the tramps to release the Mandarin; they do. He leaps at the girl again, and this time she does not resist and they embrace. With the Mandarin's longing fulfilled, his wounds begin to bleed and he dies.

== Music ==
The score begins with an orchestral depiction of the "concrete jungle." The violins have rapidly rising and falling, wave-like scales over the very unusual interval of an augmented octave. One of the central motifs of the work is set forward in bar 3 — a 6/8 rhythm in minor seconds. This motif will reappear at the violent actions of the tramps. The sound of car horns is imitated by fanfares on the trumpets and trombones. As the curtain rises, the violas play a wide-leaping theme that will be associated both with the tramps and the girl. The 3 lockspiele are scored for the clarinet, each one longer and more florid than the last. The old rake is represented by trombone glissandi spanning a minor third, another very important interval. As the tramps throw him out, the minor second in 6/8 returns. The music for the shy young man is a slow dance in 5/4, also interrupted by the 6/8 minor second as the tramps throw him out. When the Mandarin is heard in the street, the trombone plays a simple pentatonic theme harmonized by 3 lines of parallel tritones in the other trombones and the tuba. When the Mandarin enters the room, the trombones and tuba play downward glissandos, again spanning a minor third. Three measures later, this interval is played fortississimo by the full brass.

The girl's dance for the Mandarin contains both a waltz and the viola theme associated with her and the tramps. When the Mandarin seizes the girl, the minor second is heard again. The chase is represented by a fugue, whose subject also has a pentatonic flavor. The concert suite ends at this point. In the complete ballet, the 6/8 minor second returns again as the tramps rob the Mandarin. The attempted suffocation and stabbing are illustrated with great force in the orchestra. As the tramps hang the Mandarin from the lamp, the texture is blurred with glissandi on trombones, timpani, piano and cellos. The glowing body of the Mandarin is represented by the entry of a chorus singing wordlessly, once again in the interval of a minor third. The climax, after the girl embraces the Mandarin, is a theme given out fortissimo by the low brass against minor-second tremolos in the woodwinds. As the Mandarin begins to bleed, the downward minor-third glissando heard at his entry is echoed in the trombone, contrabassoon and low strings. The work then stutters arhythmically to a close.

The scoring is generally heavy, and Bartók employs many colorful techniques here, including chromatic scales, trills and tremolos in the woodwinds; glissandi in the horns, trombones and tuba; cluster chords and tremolos on the piano; scales and arpeggios on the piano, harp and celeste; and scales, double stops, trills, tremolos, and glissandi in the strings. Other special effects include fluttertonguing in the flutes; muting the brasses and strings, a cymbal roll a deux (a cymbal crash followed by scraping the plates together); playing the bass drum with the wooden part of a timpani mallet; a roll on the gong; rolled timpani glissandi; string harmonics; col legno and sul ponticello playing in the strings; scordatura in the cellos; and, at one point, quarter-tones in the violins.

In 2000 a new edition edited by Peter Bartók, the composer's son, was published. Based on the composer's written manuscripts, corrections, and the concurrently written score for piano with four hands, it restored a considerable amount of previously lost music.

== Instrumentation ==
The Ballet is scored for the following instruments:

Woodwinds

3 flutes (2nd and 3rd doubling piccolo)
3 oboes (3rd doubling English horn)
3 clarinets (second doubling E♭ clarinet and third doubling bass clarinet)
3 bassoons (third doubling contrabassoon)

Brass

4 horns (second and fourth doubling Wagner tuba)
3 trumpets in C
3 trombones
bass tuba

Percussion

timpani
snare drum
tenor drum
bass drum
cymbals
triangle
tam-tam
xylophone

Keyboards

piano
celesta
organ

Voices

mixed choir (offstage)

Strings

1st violins
2nd violins
violas
cellos
double basses

Note: The choir is only used in the original, full Ballet. It is omitted in the suite.

== Recordings ==
Performances of the ballet suite outnumbered performances of the complete ballet until recent years. Recordings of the suite include:

- Antal Doráti and the Chicago Symphony Orchestra (1953)
- Eugene Ormandy with the Philadelphia Orchestra
- Seiji Ozawa with the Boston Symphony Orchestra
- Esa-Pekka Salonen with the Los Angeles Philharmonic
- Zubin Mehta with the Berlin Philharmonic
- Jean Martinon with the Chicago Symphony Orchestra
- Susanna Mälkki with the Helsinki Philharmonic Orchestra
- David Robertson with the New York Philharmonic

Recordings of the complete ballet include:

- Antal Doráti with the BBC Symphony Orchestra (1965)
- Antal Doráti with the Detroit Symphony Orchestra (1983)
- Iván Fischer with the Budapest Festival Orchestra (This recording received the 1998 Gramophone Award in the Orchestral category.)
- Pierre Boulez with the Chicago Symphony Orchestra and Chorus
- Seiji Ozawa with the Boston Symphony Orchestra
- Marin Alsop with the Bournemouth Symphony Orchestra
- Claudio Abbado with the London Symphony Orchestra
- Simon Rattle with the City of Birmingham Symphony Orchestra
- Gerard Schwarz with the Seattle Symphony Orchestra
