= List of compositions by György Kurtág =

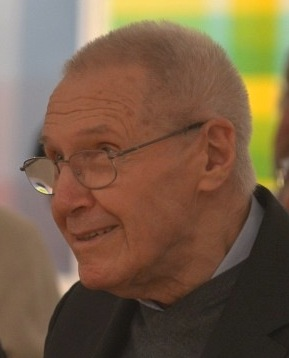

This is a list of compositions by György Kurtág.

== Compositions by opus number ==
Opus No.	Title	Instrumentation	Year
op. 1	String Quartet No. 1		1959
op. 2	Wind Quintet		1959
op. 3	Eight Pieces for piano	piano	1960
op. 4	Eight Duos	violin and cimbalom	1961
op. 5	Jelek	solo viola	1961
op. 5b	Jelek	solo cello	1961–1984
op. 6	Five Merrycate (Note: revoked, movements published as op. 6c and 6d)	guitar	1962
op. 6c	Splinters	cimbalom	1973
op. 6d	Splinters	piano	1978
op. 7c	The Sayings of P. Bornemisza	concerto for soprano and piano	1963–1968
op. 8	In Memory of a Winter Evening	Four Fragments for soprano, violin, and cimbalom	1969
op. 9	Four Capriccios	soprano and chamber ensemble	1969–1970
op. 10	24 Antiphonae (Note: unfinished, only 1–3 composed)	orchestra	1970–1971
op. 11	Four Songs to Poems by János Pilinszky	bass voice and ensemble	1973–1975
op. 12	S. K. Remembrance Noise, Seven Songs to Poems by Dezső Tandori	soprano and violin	1974–1975
op. 13	Hommage à András Mihály	12 microludes for string quartet	1977–1978
op. 14	Herdecker Eurhythmie	flute, violin, recitation, and tenor-lira	1979
op. 14d	Bagatelles	flute, double-bass, and piano	1981
op. 14e	Three Pieces	violin and piano	1979
op. 15b	The Little Predicament	piccolo, trombone, and guitar	1978
op. 15c	Grabstein für Stephan	guitar and instrumental groups	1989
op. 15d	Hommage a R. Sch.	clarinet, viola, and piano	1990
op. 16	Omaggio a Luigi Nono to poems by Anna Akhmatova and Rimma Dalos	mixed voices	1979
op. 17	Messages of the Late R. V. Troussova, words by Rimma Dalos	soprano and chamber ensemble	1976–1980
op. 18	Songs of Despair and Sorrow	mixed choir with instruments	1980–1994
op. 19	Scenes from a Novel	soprano, violin, double-bass, and cimbalom	1981–1982
op. 20	Attila József Fragments	soprano	1981–1982
op. 21	Concerto for Piano and Orchestra (Note: unfinished)		(begun 1980)
op. 22	Seven Songs	soprano and cimbalom	1981
op. 23	Eight Choruses to Poems by Dezső Tandori	mixed voices	1981–1982, 1984
op. 24	Kafka-Fragmente	soprano and violin	1985–1986
op. 25	Three Ancient Inscriptions	voice and piano	1986
op. 26	Requiem for a Friend to Poems by Rimma Dalos	soprano and piano	1986–1987
op. 27/1	...quasi una fantasia...	piano and chamber ensemble	1987–1988
op. 27/2	Double concerto	piano, violoncello, and two chamber ensembles	1989–1990
op. 28	Officium Breve in Memoriam Andreae Szervánszky	string quartet	1988–1989
op. 29	Hölderlin: An… (A Fragment)	tenor and piano	1988–1989
op. 30b	Samuel Beckett: What is the Word	recitation, mixed voices and chamber ensemble	1990–1991
op. 31b	Ligatura – Message-Hommage à Frances-Marie Uitti (The Answered Unanswered Question)	violoncello with two bows, 2 violins and celesta; or 2 violoncelli, 2 violins and celesta; or 2 organs and celesta	1989
op. 32	Lebenslauf	2 bassett horns and 2 pianos (tuned a quarter tone apart)	1992
op. 33	Stele	orchestra	1994
op. 34	Messages	orchestra	1991–1996
op. 34a	New Messages	orchestra	1998–2008
op. 35a	Hölderlin-Gesänge	baritone	1993–1997
op. 36	...pas à pas – nulle part... (poems by Beckett)	baritone, string trio, and percussion	1993–1998
op. 37	Fragments from the Scrapbooks of Georg Christoph Lichtenberg	soprano and instruments	1996
op. 38	Three Pieces	clarinet and cimbalom	1996
op. 38a	Three Other Pieces	clarinet and cimbalom	1996
op. 39	Scenes	flute	1997
op. 40	Esterházy Péter: Fancsikó és Pinta (Fragments) – Introduction to the Art of Belcanto	voice and piano/celesta	1999
op. 41	Songs to Poems by Anna Akhmatova	soprano and ensemble	1997–2008
op. 42	…concertante… (Note: winner of the 2006 Grawemeyer Award for Music Composition)	violin, viola, and orchestra	2003
op. 43	Hipartita	violin	2004
op. 44	Six Moments Musicaux	string quartet	2005
op. 45	Triptic	two violins	2007
op. 46	Colindă Baladă	choir and nine instruments	2007
op. 47	Brefs messages	nine instruments	2011
op. 48	Ligeti évszázada – Kalandozás a múltban	ensemble	2023
op. 50	...elszunnyadni, – semmi több... (Három dal Tandori Dezső verseire) (...to sleep, – no more..., (Songs to poems by Dezső Tandori))	alto[, violin, piano and percussion / cello]	2019

Notes:

Works without opus number:

- Viola Concerto (1954)
- Játékok ("Games") (since 1973, 10 Volumes as of 2021), for piano
- In Memoriam György Zilcz (1975), for 2 trumpets, 2 trombones and tuba
- 13 Pieces for Cimbalom (1982), for 2 cimbaloms
- Games and Messages for winds (since 1984)
- Transcriptions from Machaut to J.S. Bach (1985), for 4-hand and 6-hand piano and 2 pianos
- Pilinszky János: Gérard de Nerval (1986), for violoncello
- 3 In Memoriam (1988–90), for 1-hand, 2-hand and 3-hand piano
- Signs, Games and Messages for solo violin, viola, cello, double bass, flute, oboe, clarinet (since 1989)
- Ligatura E Versetti (1990), for organ
- Aus Der Ferne III (1991), for Alfred Schlee's 90th birthday, for string quartet
- Looking Back: Old and New for Four Players, Hommage à Stockhausen (1993), for trumpet, double-bass and keyboard instruments
- Epilog for Requiem of Reconciliation (1995)
- Miriam Marbé in Memoriam (1999), for three recorders
- Six Pieces for Trombone and Piano (1999)
- Petite musique solennelle – En hommage à Pierre Boulez 90 (2015) for orchestra
- Samuel Beckett: Fin de partie. Scènes et monologues, opéra en un acte (2018), opera

== Compositions by genre ==
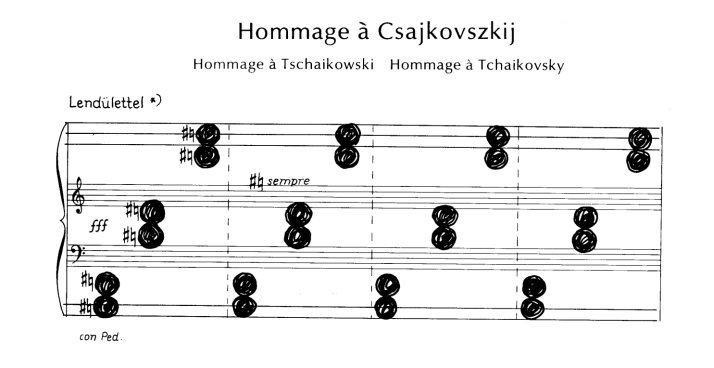
The beginning of the piece "Hommage à Tchaikovsky" from Játékok, parodying the opening of Tchaikovsky's First Piano Concerto. Kurtág uses special notation in some of the pieces. In the score above, the large black dots mean "play with both palms laid side by side".

=== Solo Instrumental ===
- Piano
  - Suite for four-hand piano (1950–1951)
  - Elö-játékok (1973–1974)
  - Játékok (Games) for piano, four-hand piano, and two pianos (10 Volumes published, 1973– )
  - Szálkák (1973–1978)
  - 3 in memoriam (1988–1990)
- Viola da Gamba
  - …sospiri, gemiti… (2011)
- Violin
  - Hipartita for solo violin (2000–2004)
  - 29 Jelek, játékok és üzenetek (Signs, Games and Messages) for solo violin (1989–2004)
- Viola
  - 29 Jelek, játékok és üzenetek (Signs, Games and Messages) for solo viola (1998–2005)
- Cello
  - 19 Jelek, játékok és üzenetek (Signs, Games and Messages) for solo cello (1987–2008)
- Double Bass
  - 4 Jelek, játékok és üzenetek (Signs, Games and Messages) for solo double bass (1999–2000)
- Flute
  - 6 Jelek, játékok és üzenetek (Signs, Games and Messages) for solo flute (1992–2005)
- Oboe
  - 6 Jelek, játékok és üzenetek (Signs, Games and Messages) for solo oboe (1997–2001)
- Clarinet
  - 6 Jelek, játékok és üzenetek (Signs, Games and Messages) for solo clarinet (1984–2001)
- Bassoon
  - 3 Jelek, játékok és üzenetek (Signs, Games and Messages) for solo bassoon (1986–2001)
- Guitar
  - Cinque Merrycate for solo guitar (1962) (Revoked)
- Organ
  - Ligature e versetti for organ (1990)
- Cymbalom
  - Szálkák for cimbalom (1973)

=== Chamber ===
- Duets
  - 8 duets for violin and cimbalom (1960)
  - Tre pezzi for violin and pianoforte (1979)
  - 13 Darab két cimbalomra a Játékokból for two cimbalom (1982)
  - Panaszos kérlelö for recorder and piano (1988)
  - Tre pezzi for clarinet and cimbalom (1996)
  - Tre altri pezzifor clarinet and cimbalom (1996)
  - Játékok és üzenetek (Games and Messages) for woodwind duo (1998–2000)
  - Jelek, játékok és üzenetek (Signs, Games and Messages) for string duo (1978–2003)
  - Négy initium az Hommage à Jacob Obrecht-ből for viola and cello (2005)
  - Triptic for two violins (2007)
- Trios
  - A kis csáva for piccolo, trombone, and guitar (1978)
  - Bagatelles for flute, piano and double bass, arrangements from Játékok (1981)
  - Hommage à R. Sch. for clarinet (and bass drum), viola, and piano (1990)
  - Myriam Marbé in memoriam for three recorders (1999)
  - Jelek, játékok és üzenetek (Signs, Games and Messages) for string trio (1989–2005)
- String Quartet
  - String quartet (1959)
  - Hommage à András Mihály 12 microludes for string quartet (1977–1978)
  - Officium breve in memoriam Andreæ Szervánszky for string quartet (1988–1989)
  - Aus der ferne III for string quartet (1991)
  - Aus der Ferne V for string quartet (1999)
  - Hommage à Jacob Obrecht for string quartet (2004–2005)
  - 6 Moments Musicaux for string quartet (1999–2005)
  - Zwiegespräch for string quartet and electronics (co-written with György Kurtág Jr.) (1999–2006)
- Other Quartets
  - Ligatura-Message to Frances-Marie The Answered Unanswered Question, for BACH-bow cello, two violins, and celesta (1989)
  - Életút (Lebenslauf) for two pianos (tuned a quarter tone apart) and two basset horns (1992)
  - Rückblick De l'ancien et du nouveau pour quatre instrumentistes (trumpet, double bass and keyboards) – Hommage à Stockhausen (1993)
- Quintets
  - Wind quintet (1959)
  - In memoriam György Zilcz for two trumpets, two trombones, and tuba (1975)
- Other
  - Irka-firka születésnapra – Mihály Andrásnak for two violons, two violas, cello, and double bass (1991)
  - Játékok és üzenetek (Games and Messages) for winds, strings, and keyboard (1992–2000)

=== Ensemble/orchestral ===
- 24 Antiphonae (1970–1971, incomplete)
- ΣΤΗΛΗ (Stele) for orchestra (1994)
- ...a Százévesnek – Hommage à Takács Jenő for small string orchestra (2002)
- Sinfonia breve per archi – Fried Márta emlékére for small string orchestra (2004)
- Új üzenetek zenekarra for orchestra (1998–2008)
- Brefs messages (2010)
- Petite musique solennelle – En hommage à Pierre Boulez 90 for orchestra (2015)
- Ligeti évszázada – Kalandozás a múltban for ensemble (2023)

=== Concertante ===
- Mouvement for viola and orchestra (1953–1954)
- Confessio concerto for piano (1980–1986)
- …quasi una fantasia… for piano and spatialized instrumental groups (1987–1988)
- Grabstein für Stephan for guitar and spatialized instrumental groups (1978–1989)
- Double concerto for piano, cello, and two spatialized instrumental groups (1989–1990)
- ...concertante... pour violin, viola, and orchestra (2003)

=== Vocal ===
- Tánc dal for children choir and piano on a text by Sandor Weöres (1950)
- Bornemisza Péter mondásai for soprano and piano on texts written by Péter Bornemisza (1963–1968)
- Egy téli alkony emlékére (4 fragments on poems by Pál Gulyás), for soprano, violin, and cimbalom (1969)
- Négy capriccio for soprano and chamber orchestra, on texts by István Bálint (1959–1970)
- Négy dal Pilinszky János verseire for bassand chamber orchestra (1975)
- Eszká-emlékzaj (7 Songs on poems by Dezső Tandori, for soprano and violin (1974–1975)
- Herdecker Eurythmie "…sur des poèmes de Ellen Lösch", for speaker and tenor vielle (1979)
- Poslanija pokojnoj R. V. Trusovoj 21 poems of Rimma Dalos, for soprano and ensemble (1976–1980)
- Hét dal for soprano and cimbalom (or piano) (1981)
- Stsenï iz romana 15 poems of Rimma Dalos for soprano, violin, double bass, and cimbalom (1979–1982)
- Három dal Pilinszky János verseire for bass and piano (1975–1986)
- Requiem po drugu for soprano and piano (1982–1987)
- Kafka-Fragmente for soprano and violin (1985–1987)
- Három régi felirat for soprano and piano (1986–1987)
- Hölderlin : An... for tenor and piano (1988–1989)
- Samuel Beckett: What is the Word Siklós István tolmácsolásában Beckett Sámuel üzeni Monyók Ildikóval for solo alto (speaker), five voices, and spatialized instrumental groups (1990–1991)
- Samuel Beckett: mi is a szó Siklós István tolmácsolásában Beckett Sámuel üzeni Monyók Ildikóval for voice and upright piano (1990)
- Pesni Unïniya i Pechali op. 18 for double mixed choir and instruments (1980–1994)
- Requiem der Versöhnung for soloists, choir and orchestra (1995)
- Üzenetek zenekarra for orchestra and mixed choir (1991–1996)
- Hölderlin-Gesänge for solo barytone (and instruments) (1993–1997)
- …pas à pas – nulle part… for barytone, percussion and string trio (1993–1998)
- Einige Sätze aus den Sudelbüchern Georg Christoph Lichtenbergs revised version for soprano and double bass (1996–1999)
- Esterházy Péter: Fancsikó és Pinta (Töredékek) – Bevezetés a Szépéneklés Müvészetébe I for solo voice, piano, and celesta (1999)
- Colindă – Baladă for tenor, two mixed choirs and instrumental ensemble (2000–2007)
- Songs to Poems by Anna Akhmatova for soprano and ensemble (1997–2008)
- ...elszunnyadni, – semmi több... (Három dal Tandori Dezső verseire) (...to sleep, – no more..., (Songs to poems by Dezső Tandori)) for solo alto, [violin, piano & percussion / cello] (2019)

=== A cappella ===
- Klárisok for mixed choir on a poem by Attila József (1950)
- Omaggio a Luigi Nono op. 16 for choir (1979)
- Kórkép és Hattyudal for mixed choir (1978–1981)
- József Attila-töredékek for solo soprano (1981)
- Nyolc kórus Tandori Dezső verseir for mixed choir (1981–1984)

=== Opera ===
- Samuel Beckett: Fin de partie. Scènes et monologues, opéra en un acte (2018)
- Die Stechardin, In memoriam Márta Kurtág, Opera in four parts, libretto by Christoph Hein (2023–2025)
