= Szervánszky =

Szervánszky is a Hungarian surname, which refer to:

- Endre Szervánszky (1911–1977), a Hungarian composer;
- Jenő Szervánszky (1906–2005), a Hungarian post-impressionist artist;
- Péter Szervánszky (1913–1985), a Hungarian violinist;
- Valéria Szervánszky (born 1947), a Hungarian pianist.
