= Die Stechardin =

2025 opera by György Kurtág

- Opera by György Kurtág
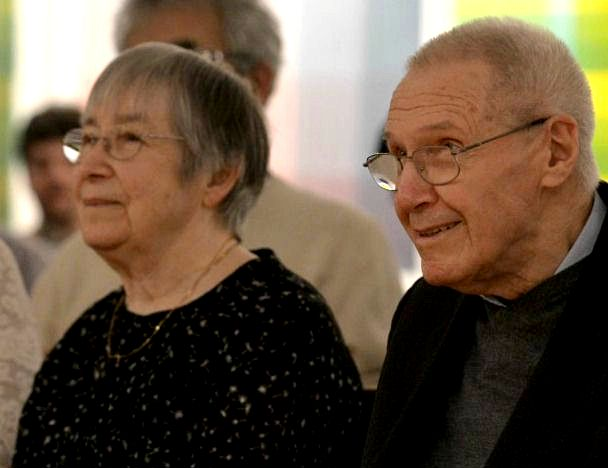
- Márta and György Kurtág, in 2014
- Librettist: Christoph Hein
- Language: German
- Based on: Life of Maria Dorothea Stechard and Georg Christoph Lichtenberg
- Premiere: 20 February 2026; Müpa Budapest

Die Stechardin ('The Stechard Woman') is a one-act opera in four scenes by György Kurtág, set to a libretto in German by Christoph Hein. His second opera, it is a monodrama for one woman, portraying Maria Dorothea Stechard, Georg Christoph Lichtenberg's domestic help and beloved. Kurtág worked on the composition from 2023 to 2025 and dedicated it to his late wife, Márta Kurtág. It was published by Editio Musica Budapest, and premiered at the Müpa Budapest on 20 February 2026 as part of a festival for his centenary.

== History ==
György Kurtág's first opera, Fin de partie, to his libretto based on Beckett's play Endgame, was premiered at La Scala in Milan in 2018. The composer, then age 92, and his wife Márta were too frail to travel there. His wife died the following year, and his composing ceased for a while.

He composed Die Stechardin, his second opera, from 2023 to 2025, on a commission from the Budapest Music Center. He requested a libretto from Christoph Hein. It is based on the life of Maria Dorothea Stechard, domestic help and beloved of the naturalist Georg Christoph Lichtenberg. The only role of the monodrama is the young woman whom Lichtenberg mentioned briefly in letters by her surname as Die Stechardin. She moved in with him at age 15; he later wrote that she was his only love, and that he wanted to marry her, but she died at age 17, before reaching legal age. Literature about her includes Die kleine Stechardin, a novel by Gert Hofmann translated into English as Lichtenberg and the Little Flower Girl.

In the opera, she expresses her desire to meet her lover again after she died. The woman rather belongs to myth than reality; her narration is structured in four scenes:

- In einer anderen Welt … (In Another World …)
- Die Vorgeschichte (The Backstory)
- Über die Liebe (About Love)
- Krankheit und Tod (Illness and death)

Kurtág, an avid reader of literature, had set aphorisms by Lichtenberg in 1999, Einige Sätze aus den Sudelbüchern Georg Christoph Lichtenbergs (Some sentences from Georg Christoph Lichtenberg's scrapbooks), as 22 miniatures for soprano and double bass. He had also set texts by Friedrich Hölderlin, Attila József, Franz Kafka and János Pilinszky.

His music in the opera is never sentimental, close to the text in the vocal lines, and often changing metre in an instrumental soundscape like chamber music, with small gestures focused on the essential. Zsolt Serej assisted with the orchestration for a symphony orchestra. Eleonore Büning, writing for the Neue Zürcher Zeitung, noted that his compositions have a vocal character, even those for instruments, "speaking" of "death and oblivion, of the defeats and transience of human existence".

The opera was premiered in a half-scenic production, directed by Csaba Káel, at the Müpa Budapest on 20 February 2026, one day after Kurtág's 100th birthday. It was performed by soprano Maria Husmann, whose voice Kurtág had in mind, and the Concerto Budapest, conducted by András Keller. As the violinist of the Keller Quartet, he is an expert of Kurtág's music.

The performance was a highlight of a festival in honour of Kurtág's centenary, held by the Budapest Music Centre, the Müpa and the Franz Liszt Academy of Music, among others. The composer attended together with Vera Ligeti, the widow of his friend György Ligeti. The performance was preceded by Beethoven's String Quartet, Op. 130, Bartók's Piano Concerto No. 3, and works by Kurtág: the Petite musique solennelle en hommage à Pierre Boulez, the Double Concerto for Cello and Piano, Op. 27, No. 2 and the Movement for Viola and Orchestra.

The opera was published by Editio Musica Budapest. The duration is given as 40 minutes. Kúrtag dedicated the work to his wife, with a handwritten line at the end of the printed score translating to "For Márta. I come. I come to you.".
