= Tamara Stefanovich =

Serbian pianist

Tamara Stefanovich (born 1973) is a German-Serbian pianist known for her interpretations of contemporary and classical repertoire. She has performed with major orchestras and at international festivals, collaborating with composers and musicians in modern and classical music.

== Early life and education ==
Stefanovich was born in Belgrade, Yugoslavia (present day Serbia) to a Serbian father and a Croatian mother. She showed an early aptitude for music and became the youngest student admitted to the University of Belgrade at the age of 13, where she studied under Lili Petrović. After receiving her bachelor's degree at 17, she attended for three years the Curtis Institute of Music in Philadelphia, studying with Claude Frank, and then moved to Germany to continue her education at the Hochschule für Musik und Tanz in Cologne under Pierre-Laurent Aimard.

== Career ==
Stefanovich has performed with several major orchestras including The Cleveland Orchestra, the Chicago Symphony Orchestra, the London Symphony Orchestra, and the Chamber Orchestra of Europe. She has worked with conductors and composers such as Pierre Boulez, György Kurtág, Hans Abrahamsen, and Sir George Benjamin.

Her performances have taken place at major concert venues such as Carnegie Hall, the Berlin Philharmonie, Suntory Hall in Tokyo, and London’s Royal Albert Hall, Barbican Centre and Wigmore Hall. She is a regular performer at festivals including La Roque d'Anthéron, Salzburger Festspiele, and Beethovenfest Bonn.

== Recordings ==
Stefanovich's discography includes recordings of modern and classical works. Notable releases include Kurtág's Quasi una Fantasia and his double concerto with the Asko|Schönberg Ensemble under Reinbert de Leeuw, which received the Edison Award in 2018, and Bartók's Concerto for Two Pianos, Percussion and Orchestra, performed with Pierre-Laurent Aimard and the London Symphony Orchestra under Pierre Boulez. In recent years, Stefanovich has explored improvised music collaborating with Christopher Dell, Christian Lillinger, and Jonas Westergaard in the SDLW Quartet. Their performances in Germany and their 2024 album DLW: Extended Beats won the German Record Critics' Award. Additionally, in 2025, she released Organised Delirium: Piano Sonatas by Boulez, Shostakovich, Bartók, and Eisler, a critically acclaimed solo album exploring the works of these composers.

== Selected discography ==
- Béla Bartók – Concerto for Two Pianos, Percussion, and Orchestra (with Pierre-Laurent Aimard, Yuri Bashmet, Gidon Kremer, London Symphony Orchestra & Berliner Philharmoniker, conducted by Pierre Boulez) – 2008, Deutsche Grammophon, OCLC 310228322
- György Kurtág – Complete Works for Ensemble and Choir (with Asko|Schönberg Ensemble, conducted by Reinbert de Leeuw) – 2017, ECM Records, OCLC 1027754806
- Influences – Works by Bach, Beethoven, Berg, Messiaen, Ives – 2020, Pentatone, OCLC 1117350265
- Stefanovich, Dell, Lillinger, Westergaard: SDLW - 2022, Bastille Musique, OCLC 1374326672
- Hans Abrahamsen – Left, Alone (with WDR Symphony Orchestra Cologne, conducted by Ilan Volkov) – 2023, Winter & Winter, OCLC 1399143059
- Organised Delirium: Piano Sonatas by Boulez, Shostakovich, Bartók, and Eisler – 2025, Pentatone OCLC 1530621446
- Scarlatti: Sonatas – 2025, Pentatone
