= István Kassai =

Hungarian musician

István Kassai (born 26 March 1959) is a Hungarian pianist. He graduated at the Budapest Liszt Academy of Music in 1982 studying in the class of Pál Kadosa. Then in 1984 he pursued his second diploma in the Conservatoire Européen de Musique de Paris under the close supervision of Yvonne Lefébure. During and after his studies he also undertook several master courses, such as the one led by György Cziffra in Senlis and Keszthely, too.

During his career, he has won several first prizes in international competitions such as the International Youth Piano Competition in Ústí nad Labem 1972 in Czechoslovakia, the Hungarian Radio Piano Competition in 1979, and the Premier Grand Prix in the International Debussy Piano Competition, Saint-Germain-en-Laye, Paris in 1982. He was acknowledged by the ARTISJUS-Prize in 1976, the Bonnaud-Chevillion-Prize of the Fondation de France in 1986, the Nívó Prize of the Hungarian Radio in 1990, the Ferenc Liszt Prize in 2001 and the Weiner Leó Memorial Prize in 2010. He is a full member in the Hungarian Academy of Arts since 2013.

István Kassai made CD recordings of the complete piano works of Ernest Bloch, Ferenc Erkel, Mihály Mosonyi, Leó Weiner, Jenő Hubay and Sándor Balassa, which was followed by more than a dozen of CD releases including works by Ernő Dohnányi, Ferenc Liszt, Béla Bartók, Robert Volkmann, Imre Széchényi and Johannes Brahms. At his concerts, he played the premieres or the first modern performances of numerous piano works i.e. pieces of Brahms and Bartók. The Hungarian Radio has archived many recordings of his performances. He has published numerous articles and studies on music and edited many volumes of sheet music by composers and musicians such as Liszt, Mosonyi, Hubay, Weiner and György Cziffra.
