= National Film Institute Hungary =

Hungarian film organisation

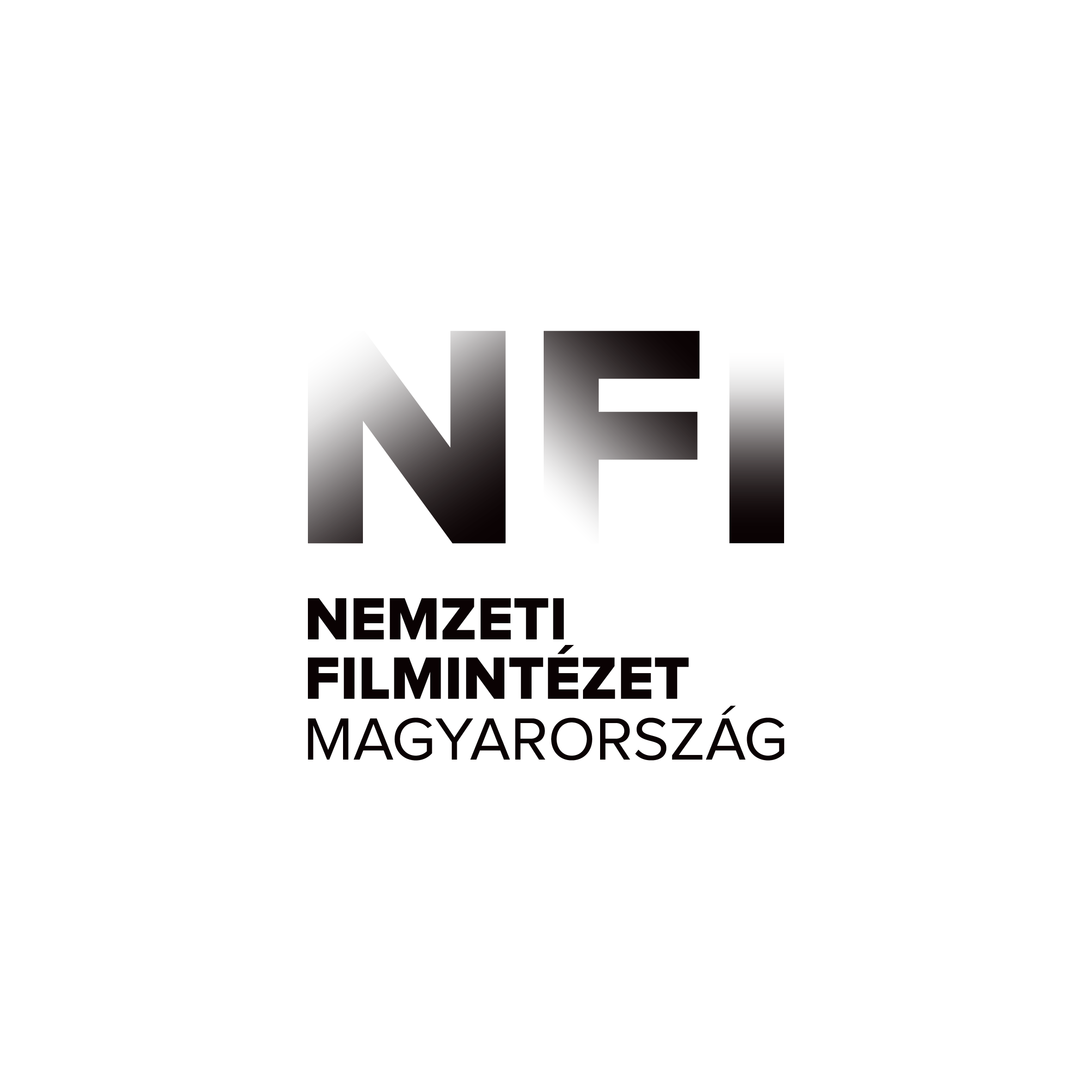
- Formerly: Magyar Nemzeti Filmalap
- Company type: Private company limited by shares
- Industry: Film industry
- Predecessor: Magyar Mozgókép Közalapítvány
- Headquarters: Budapest, Hungary
- Key people: Csaba Káel
- Website: https://nfi.hu/en

The National Film Institute Hungary (NFI), known in its original full Hungarian name as Nemzeti Filmintézet Közhasznú Nonprofit Zártkörűen Működő Részvénytársaság, in short Nemzeti Filmintézet (NFI), was formed by the merger of the Magyar Nemzeti Filmalap and the Médiamecenatúra Program.

Act CVI of 16 December 2019 amending certain laws in connection with the establishment of the Nemzeti Filmintézet Közhasznú Nonprofit Zártkörűen Működő Részvénytársaság contained the necessary legislative amendments for the transformation of the structure of the entire Hungarian film production. The essence of the new legislation was that, following its establishment, the National Film Institute Hungary (NFI) would be responsible for the coordinated activities of the entire Hungarian film industry.

The Magyar Nemzeti Filmalap, established in 2011, was one of the predecessors of the NFI, a Hungarian state organisation that provided support for the development, pre-production, production and distribution (marketing) of feature films, documentaries and animated films intended for cinema distribution. It also promoted the development of the Hungarian film community and the Hungarian film industry through its educational programme and events.

In 2020, the application system for cinema and television productions was unified, and the National Film Institute Hungary (NFI) became the successor to the NMHH Média Mecenatúra program, the Televíziós Film Mecenatúra and the Televíziós Filmkollégium. Thus, the NFI also includes the application systems for television films, television series, educational films and short films.

== Structure of the organisation ==
The National Film Institute Hungary (NFI) is overseen by a Government Commissioner responsible for the film industry, appointed by the government for an indefinite term.

=== Government Commissioners for Film ===
- Andrew Vajna (2011–2019)
- Csaba Káel (2019–)

=== Directorates ===
The NFI carries out its functions through its directorates. The system of directorates, detailed below, maps the broad operations of the NFI, from subsidies through Mafilm to education.

==== Executive directorate ====
The Executive Directorate assists and supports the work of the CEO and Deputy CEO(s), as well as the Board of Directors and the NFI's Supervisory Board. The working organisation of the NFI is led by the CEO, who is supported by the Deputy CEO(s).

- CEO: Ákos Pál
- Deputy Chief Operating Officer: Ákos Budai

==== Film Archive ====
Founded in 1957 and operating as a public collection since 1992, the Film Archive (Filmarchívum) is responsible for the preservation, conservation, research, restoration and publication of the national film heritage. From 1 January 2017, the Film Archiv was part of the Magyar Nemzeti Filmalap, and subsequently, from 1 January 2020, it continued its activities as part of the NFI.

Director: György Ráduly

==== Film Lab ====
Film Lab (Filmlabor) is Hungary's largest film post-production studio with a long history. For more than 60 years, it has been providing a full range of post-production services to its domestic and international clients, harmoniously combining traditional film editing with digital technology. Thanks to its continuous development, it has state-of-the-art equipment. Its digital services include on-location data capture, digital music production, lighting, VFX, DCP production. In addition to post-production work on feature films, TV films and commercials, the Film Lab also has a special focus on the restoration of archive films.

- Director: László Aradi

==== Mafilm ====
Read more: Mafilm

The division provides studio and exterior set, prop, costume and weapon rental services for domestic and foreign film and television productions. It also rents out office space and operates locations in Budapest and Fót.

- Director: Andrea Ildikó Ottinger

=== Film Jury ===
The NFI's five-member Film Jury is responsible for the evaluation of applications for support from the Filmalap. The members of the committee make their decisions based solely on professional criteria, one of the most important of which is that a given production must combine creative strength with financial feasibility - in the interests of festival and audience success.

==== Members ====
- Csaba Káel
- András Kálmán
- Ákos Pesti
- Tibor Fonyódi
- Ákos Pál

==== Deputy member ====
- György Lukácsy

== Filmio ==
In 2020, NFI launched its own VOD (video-on-demand) streaming service called Filmio. The aim of the film library is to make recent Hungarian films and restored classics from the past available to the general public. At its launch on 19 November 2020, nearly 160 films were made available, and since then NFI has been adding two films a week - with new uploads becoming available every Thursday at 00:00.
