= Játékok =

Collection of piano pieces by György Kurtág

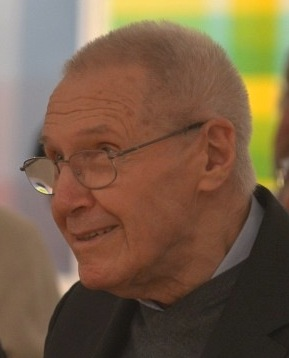
György Kurtág in 2014

Játékok (Hungarian: Games, pronounced [ˈjaːteːkok]) is an ongoing collection of "pedagogical performance pieces" by György Kurtág. He has been writing them since 1973. Ten volumes had been published as of 2021 (by Editio Musica Budapest). Volumes I, II, III, V, VI, VII, IX and X are for piano solo. Volumes IV and VIII are for piano 4-hands or two pianos.

Volume I was essentially completed in 1973 but not published until 1979, by which time Volumes II, III and IV had also been composed. Volumes V and VI were published in 1997, Volume VII in 2003, Volume VIII in 2010, Volume IX in 2017, and Volume X in 2021.

Several pieces from the collection have started to be regularly performed, including a Prelude and Chorale, an Antiphon in F♯, and one called 3 in memoriam.

== Concept ==
Kurtág began the composition of Játékok to try to recapture something of the spirit of a child's play. He started with a few ideas set out in the foreword to the first four volumes:

The idea of composing Játékok was suggested by children playing spontaneously, children for whom the piano still means a toy. They experiment with it, caress it, attack it and run their fingers over it. They pile up seemingly disconnected sounds, and if this happens to arouse their musical instinct they look consciously for some of the harmonies found by chance and keep repeating them.

Thus, this series does not provide a tutor, nor does it simply stand as a collection of pieces. It is possibly for experimenting and not for learning “to play the piano”. Pleasure in playing, the joy of movement – daring and if need be fast movement over the entire keyboard right from the first lessons instead of the clumsy groping for keys and the counting of rhythms – all these rather vague ideas lay at the outset of the creation of this collection.

Playing is just playing. It requires a great deal of freedom and initiative from the performer. On no account should the written image be taken seriously but the written image must be taken extremely seriously as regards the musical process, the quality of sound and silence. We should trust the picture of the printed notes and let it exert its influence upon us. The graphic picture conveys an idea about the arrangement in time of the even the most free pieces. We should make use of all that we know and remember of free declamation, folk-music, parlando-rubato, of Gregorian chant, and of all that improvisational musical practice has ever brought forth. Let us tackle bravely even the most difficult task without being afraid of making mistakes: we should try to create valid proportions, unity and continuity out of the long and short values – just for our own pleasure!

== Recordings ==
- György Kurtág: Játékok Márta Kurtág and György Kurtág piano. With Bach transcriptions by Kurtág himself and his wife Márta. Recorded July 1996. ECM New Series 1619 (CD) OCLC 1121477623
- György Kurtág: Játékok Valeria Szervánszky and Ronald Cavaye. The first complete recording of volumes 1–4. Recorded October 1992. (4 CDs - available on iTunes, Amazon, CD Baby, etc.)

== Performances ==
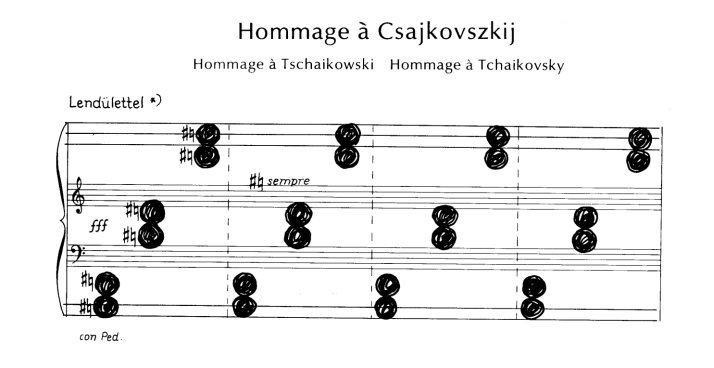
The beginning of the piece "Hommage à Tchaikovsky", parodying the opening of his First Piano Concerto. Kurtág uses special notation in some of the pieces. In the score above, the large black dots mean "play with both palms laid side by side".

György Kurtág and his wife Márta performed an always-renewing selection of pieces for two and four hands, including transcriptions. The later volumes of Játékok bear the sub-title Diary Entries and Personal Messages. This, to some extent, reveals the lineage of the unique microcosms, which irresistibly involve the listener at their recitals.

The couple played a selection as part of the Composer's Portrait of the Rheingau Musik Festival, 8 August 2004, in the "Kulturforum Schillerplatz" (now "ESWE Atrium") in Wiesbaden. The Bach transcriptions, interspersed with the miniature character pieces, were Aus tiefer Not (BWV 687), Sonatina from Actus Tragicus, Trio sonata in E♭ major (BWV 525) and O Lamm Gottes (BWV 618).

They performed in Carnegie Hall’s Zankel Hall in February 2009.
