= Péter Bornemisza =

Hungarian bishop and playwright (1535–1587)

Péter Bornemisza (c. 1535 – 1584) was a Hungarian Lutheran bishop of noble birth. His father was killed by the Turks around the time he was six years old. A scholar from England, at the University of Cracow, first interested him in Protestantism and later Philipp Melanchthon had a strong impact on him. He later preached and printed Protestant works in his native land. In addition to religious work he proved to be a significant playwright of works such as Magyar Elektra.

Hungarian composer György Kurtág's song cycle The Sayings of Péter Bornemisza (1963–1968) for soprano and piano incorporates brief texts from Bornemisza's sermons.
