= Valéria Szervánszky =

Hungarian pianist

Valéria Szervánszky (born October 1947) is a Hungarian classical pianist, born in Budapest and now a resident of the United Kingdom.

== Life ==
Szervánszky studied at the Franz Liszt Academy of Music in Budapest, Hungary with Pál Kadosa and György Kurtág. In 1973 she joined the class of Professor Hans Leygraf at the Staatliche Hochschule für Musik und Theater in Hannover in Germany, and on graduating returned to the Liszt Academy to teach the Exceptionally Gifted Children's Class with Professor Klára Máthé, where she also worked as an assistant to Professor Kadosa. Szervánszky also played for the cello class of Miklos Perényi. In 1979 she took up a position as professor of piano at Musashino Academy of Music in Tokyo and taught in Japan until moving to London in 1986.

Szervánszky is the daughter of the post-impressionist artist, Jenő Szervánszky and the niece of the composer, Endre Szervánszky and violinist, Péter Szervánszky.

=== Teaching and masterclasses ===
Szervánszky is active as both a pianist and teacher. She travels to Tokyo several times a year for master-classes and teaching. In London she teaches at the Purcell School for Young Musicians.

She is also in demand for music courses and has taught at the International Bartók Festival in Hungary, the British Kodály Academy, the twentieth-century music course at the Centre Acanthes, Avignon, the Orlando Festival in Holland and the International Musician's Seminar at Prussia Cove.

=== Performances ===
Since 1979, Szervánszky has concentrated primarily on the piano duo partnership with her husband, Ronald Cavaye and they have performed extensively in Europe and the Far East - particularly in Japan. They have broadcast for the BBC and Hungarian Radio and also recorded the Mozart concertos for two and three pianos and Stravinsky’s own arrangement of The Rite of Spring for piano duet, together with works by Ravel and Debussy. They have also frequently worked with the Hungarian composer György Kurtág. In the autumn of 1996 Szervánszky directed Kurtág’s incidental music incorporated in a new production of Vladimir Nabokov's play Der Pol (The Pole) in Berlin, Paris (Paris Autumn Festival), Zurich and Lausanne. Szervánszky and Ronald Cavaye made the first complete CD recording of the first four volumes (solos, duets and two pianos) of Kurtág's collection of pieces Játékok – Games. At the 1994 International Bartók Festival they gave the Hungarian première of Kurtág’s Lebenslauf for two pianos and two basset horns and have since performed the work in Budapest and London (with members of the London Sinfonietta). Szervánszky and Cavaye have written a guide for teachers and students to the first volume of Mikrokosmos by Béla Bartók, published in Japanese by the Zen-On Music Publishing Company.

Szervánszky is a Steinway Artist.
