= András Keller =

Hungarian violinist

- Born: 1960 (age 65–66)
- Education: Liszt Academy of Music
- Occupation: violinist

András Keller (born 1960) is a Hungarian violinist and a founder of the Keller Quartet. He also works as a director and conductor of Concerto Budapest.

At the age of 7, Keller began playing the instrument and seven years later was admitted to the Liszt Academy of Music, where his teachers were Dénes Kovács, György Kurtág, and Ferenc Rados. Later, he also studied with Sándor Végh in Salzburg.

In 1983, Keller won the Hubay Violin Competition, after which he received an invitation from János Ferencsik to become the National State Orchestra's leader. During the same time, he worked as a soloist for the National Philharmonia and from 1984 to 1991 was the Budapest Festival Orchestra's leader. In 1987, he founded his own quartet and three years later became Reggio Emilia's string competition winner. Throughout the years, he has performed with Heinz Holliger, Ralph Kirshbaum, Gidon Kremer, Mstislav Rostropovich, Kim Kashkashian, among many others.

The recipient of the Premio Franco Abbiati, Liszt Prize, and Bartók-Pásztory Prize, he was named an Artist of Merit of Hungary and was also nominated for the United Kingdom's Royal Philharmonic Society Award. His recordings have been awarded the Caecilia Prix (BE), Deutsche Schallplattenpreis, Edison Award (NL), Grand Prix de l’Académie Charles Cros (FR), MIDEM Classical Award (FR), Gramophon Award (UK) and Record Academy Award (JP).

Keller has been performing György Kurtág's works worldwide and conducted the Orchestra di Padova e del Veneto in 2013. During the same years, he also appeared with Kremerata Baltica at the Lockenhaus Festival. In 2007, he was appointed as Artistic Director and Chief Conductor of Concerto Budapest, formerly known as the Hungarian Symphony Orchestra. Under his leadership, Concerto Budapest has earned a reputation as one of the most respected Hungarian touring orchestras, annually presenting over sixty concerts in Budapest, in addition to concerts and festival appearances in the most prestigious venues of Asia and Europe.

He was the artistic director of the Arcus Temporum Festival between 2004 and 2009 and has been holding to this position again since 2016.

András Keller is a regular guest professor of the International Musicians Seminar Prussia Cove and the Aix-en-Provence Festival. Between 2012 and 2015, he served as the head of the Chamber Music Department at the Franz Liszt Academy of Music. Since 2016, he has been teaching at the violin faculty of The Guildhall School of Music & Drama, London where in 2018 he was appointed as Béla Bartók International Chair in recognition of his world-class performing career and services to music.
