= Pál Kadosa =

Hungarian composer (1903–1983)

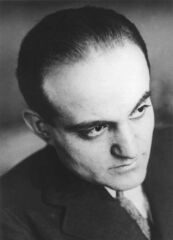
Pál Kadosa, 1933

Pál Kadosa (Hungarian pronunciation: [ˈpaːl ˈkɒdoʃɒ]; 6 September 1903, Léva, Austria-Hungary (now Levice, Slovakia) – 30 March 1983, Budapest) was a pianist and Hungarian composer of the post-Bartók generation. His early style was influenced by Hungarian folklore while his later works were more toward Hindemith and expressively forceful idioms. He was born in Levice. He studied at the national Hungarian Royal Academy of Music under Arnold Székely and Zoltán Kodály. He was appointed to the faculty of the Fodor School in 1927 where he taught until 1943 when he was forced out due to wartime political issues.

In 1945 he joined the faculty of the Franz Liszt Academy where he taught, eventually becoming head of the piano department, until his death in 1983. His students included such leading musicians as György Ligeti, György Kurtág, Iván Erőd, Ferenc Rados, Arpad Joó, András Schiff, Zoltán Kocsis, Dezső Ránki, Valéria Szervánszky, Ronald Cavaye, Jenő Jandó, Kenji Watanabe, István Kassai, and Balázs Szokolay, among others.

Kadosa served on the Hungarian Arts Council and become an honorary member of the Royal Academy of Music. Kadosa's work included two operas, eight symphonies, four sonatas, and six concertos.
