= Ronald Cavaye =

British pianist (born 1951)

Ronald Cavaye (born August 1951) is a British pianist.

== Life ==
Ronald Cavaye was born in Aldershot, Hampshire, England, where he attended Heron Wood School. He began to play the piano at the age of 11 and entered the music department of Winchester School of Art at age 16. He studied there for 2 years with the Canadian-born pianist, Carlina Carr. In 1969, he began studying at the Royal College of Music in London where his teachers were Malcolm Binns and Oliver Davies. In 1973 he gained a DAAD scholarship to study at the Staatliche Hochschule für Musik und Theater Hannover where his teacher was Hans Leygraf. A further scholarship from the British Council enabled him to continue his studies at the Franz Liszt Academy of Music in Budapest where he studied with Pál Kadosa and György Kurtág. Marrying the Hungarian pianist, Valeria Szervánszky, Cavaye then went to teach in Japan where he was appointed professor of piano at Musashino Academy of Music in 1979.

Now living in London, Ronald Cavaye returns regularly to Japan for concerts, teaching and to work as a translator/narrator for the kabuki and bunraku theatres.

== Performances ==
Cavaye specialised mainly in music of the 20th century but now concentrates on the piano duo repertoire, principally with Valeria Szervánszky. Szervánszky and Cavaye have performed in Europe and the Far East, China and the USA. They have recorded the Mozart Concertos for 2 and 3 pianos, Stravinsky's arrangement of The Rite of Spring for piano duet as well as works by Ravel and Debussy. They also made the first complete CD recording of the first four volumes (solos, duets and two pianos) of György Kurtág's Játékok – "Games". In 1996 Ronald Cavaye also gave the Japanese première Kurtág's …quasi una fantasia… Op.27 No.1 with the New Japan Philharmonic Orchestra, conducted by Michiyoshi Inoue. Ronald Cavaye is a Steinway Artist.

== Master-classes and competitions ==
Cavaye has taught master-classes at the International Bartók Festival in Hungary, the Central Conservatory in Beijing, the Royal College of Music, London, the Royal Academy of Music, London, Trinity College of Music, London and the Musikhochschule in Graz. He also regularly serves on the jury of international piano competitions such as the World Piano Competition in Cincinnati, USA, the Concours International de Piano XXeme. siecle in Orléans, France, the Sakai International Piano Competition in Japan and the International Piano Duo Competition in Tokyo.

== Writing ==
Cavaye is the author of Music Education of the Japanese (in Japanese): Shinchosha, Japan and has written articles for the Edinburgh Festival, the Paris Autumn Festival and The Times newspaper, London.

== Kabuki and bunraku ==
An expert on the kabuki theatre of Japan, since 1982 he has been a translator/narrator for the Earphone Guide in use at Tokyo's Kabuki-za and National Theatres.

- He is the author of –
- "Kabuki – A Pocket Guide" – Charles E. Tuttle, USA and Japan.
- "A Guide to the Japanese Stage" – with Paul Griffith and Akihiko Senda, Kodansha International, Japan.
- He has translated for "Kabuki Plays on Stage Vol. III – Darkness and Desire" – University of Hawai’i Press.

DVD translations and narrations include –

- "Kabuki Meisaku Shu" – "The Best Selection of Kabuki", published in Japan by Shochiku Home Video/NHK DVD.
- Subtitles for the complete Bunraku performance of Kanadehon Chūshingura – "The Treasury of Loyal Retainers" (with Paul Griffith).
- Kabuki-za Sayonara Kōen – "Farewell to the Kabuki-za – All the Performances", 8 volumes of about 95 DVDs of all the performances given in the 16 months before the demolition of the old Kabuki-za in Tokyo. All the DVDs were translated by Ronald Cavaye and Paul Griffith and narrated by Paul Griffith – published in Japan by Shogakkan.
