= Sándor Balassa =

Hungarian composer (1935–2021)

Sándor Balassa (20 January 1935 – 14 May 2021) was a Hungarian composer and music educator.

== Life ==
Born in Budapest, Balassa attended a musical school and then studied music with Endre Szervánszky. In 1964 he started working at the Hungarian Radio where he created music programs. Since 1981 he also taught at the Academy of Music. He retired from this position in 1996.

Balassa was awarded the Kossuth Prize in 1983.

== Orchestra compositions ==
- Dimenziók (Dimensions; Dimensioni) for flute and viola, Op. 8, 1966;
- Zenith, op.10, for alto and orchestra, 1971;
- Hárfástrio (Harp Trio), Trio for violin, viola and harp, Op. 19, 1971;
- Iris, op. 22, for orchestra, 1971;
- Glarusi ének, op. 29, for orchestra, (The Song of Glarus), 1978;
- Az örök ifjúság szigete, op. 32 for orchestra, (The End of Eternal Youth), 1979;
- Hívások és kiáltások, op. 33 for orchestra, 1981;
- Egy álmodozó naplója, op. 35 for orchestra, (Diary of a Daydreamer), 1983;
- Három fantázia zenekarra, op. 36 for orchestra, (Three fantasies), 1984;
- Szőlőcske és halacska, op. 40 for orchestra, 1987;
- Tündér Ilona, op. 45 for orchestra (with Elfje Ilona), 1992;
- Csaba királyfi, op. 46 for string orchestra, (Prince Csaba) 1993;
- Bölcskei concert, op. 49, for string orchestra, 1993;
- Mucsai táncok - avagy egy komolyzenei Lagzilajcsi fantazmagóriái, op. 50 for orchestra (Dancing from Mucsa), 1994;
- Fűzérke (Little Garland) for flute, viola and harp, Op. 51, 1994;
- A nap fiai, op. 54 for orchestra (Sons of the Sun), 1995;
- Négy arckép szimfonikus zenekarra, op. 56 for orchestra (Four Historical Portraits), 1996;
- 301-es parcella, op. 58 for orchestra (Package No.301), 1997;
- Pécsi concerto öt szólistára és vonószenekarra, op. 61 for violin, cello, oboe, bassoon, harp and string orchestra (Concert for the City of Pécs), 1999;
- Magyar koronázási zene, op. 63 for orchestra (Hungarian Coronation Music), 1998;
- Hunok völgye, op. 69 symphonic poem for orchestra, (Valley of the Huns), 1999;
- Október virágai, op. 77 for orchestra (Oktoberbloemen), 2003;
- Naphegyi kirándulás, op. 81 for string orchestra (Trips to Naphegyi), 2003;
- Szegedi concerto, op. 88 for string orchestra (Concert for Szeged), 2004;
- Nyári zene, op. 89 for flute and string orchestra (Summer Music), 2003;
- Üdvözlet Violának (Greetings to Viola) for viola solo, Op. 90, 2005;
- Civisek városa, op. 91 for orchestra (Music for Debrecen), 2005;
- Utazások Biharban, op. 93 for orchestra (Excursions to Bihar), 2005;
- Lovagi erények dicsérete, op.100 for orchestra, 2007.

The Hungarian music label Hungaroton has published some of Balassa's orchestral works and recorded his opera Karel en Anna.
