= Ákos Rózmann =

Hungarian-Swedish Composer and Organist

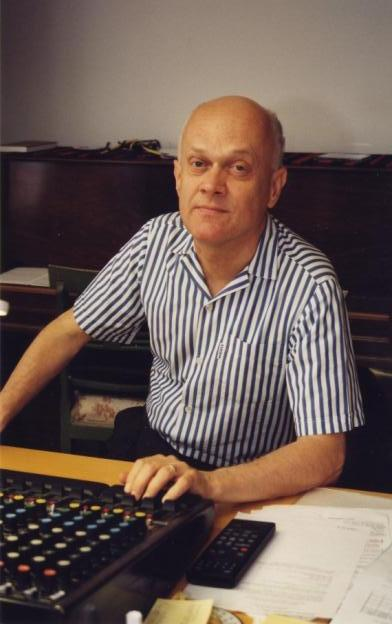
Ákos Rózmann

Ákos Rózmann (Hungarian: [ˈaːkoʃ ˈroːzmɒnn]; 16 July 1939 – 12 August 2005) was a Hungarian-Swedish composer and organist.

== Early life and education ==
Rózmann was born in Budapest, Hungary, on 16 July 1939. He studied composition with Rezső Sugár at the Bartók Béla Secondary School of Music between 1957 and 1961. From 1961 on, he attended the Franz Liszt Academy of Music, studying composition with Endre Szervánszky and organ with Sebestyén Pécsi. He graduated in both subjects in 1966.

== Biography ==
After gaining his diplomas, he worked as a teacher of score reading at the Teacher's College of the Liszt Academy in Szeged. At the end of the sixties, he composed film music for Mafilm (Hungarian Film Studios). His Improvisazione for flute and piano was published in 1971 by Editio Musica Budapest.

In 1971, he went to Sweden for postgraduate studies in composition. His teacher was Ingvar Lidholm at the Royal College of Music in Stockholm. In the college studio, he discovered the tools of electroacoustic music making. He also started to work in Elektronmusikstudion (EMS, the Stockholm Electroacoustic Music Studio). The first result of his experiments was Impulsioni, a cycle of short electronic pieces from 1974, which won third prize at the Bourges Concours International de Musique Électroacoustique in 1976.

After finishing his studies at the Royal College of Music in 1974, Rózmann settled in Stockholm, spending the rest of his life in and near the Swedish capital. From the seventies on, he thought of recorded electroacoustic music as the only suitable medium for his creative ideas. His first conspicuous public appearance as a composer was the premiere of Bilder inför drömmen och döden (Images of Dream and Death) on 9 March 1978. The concert was held in Cirkus, a large event hall in Stockholm.

From 1978 for nineteen years he was an organist at the Stockholm Catholic Cathedral. Here he met the choir-leader and musicologist Viveca Servatius, who later became his life partner. 1978 also saw the beginning of his second large-scale work, Tolv stationer (Twelve Stations), the first one to use recorded sounds of acoustic origin (while the previous two used entirely synthetic material). Its composition engaged Rózmann until as late as 2001, resulting in a work with a playing time of more than six hours. The first parts premiered at the Stockholm Culture House in 1984. In 2014 Editions Mego records released a 7-CD box set of the entire series of the Stations.

In the early eighties, Rózmann started to build a private electroacoustic studio which he installed in the basement of the Catholic Cathedral. Besides, he continued to work in EMS where he remained a frequent visitor until the end of his life.

Between 1980 and 2005, he composed a series of eight electroacoustic works, each with the title Orgelstycke (Organ Piece). Sounds from his main instrument, the organ, were his much appreciated basic material, besides the human voice and the sounds of bowed zither and prepared piano.

Rózmann's third piece of epic length, Rytmer och melodier (Rhythms and Melodies) was composed in 1987 and premiered at the Berwald Concert Hall in 1988. In 1990, a series of three author's nights dedicated to Rózmann was held in the Stockholm centre for contemporary music, Fylkingen. Six of his pieces were played on that occasion, three of them for the first time.

While almost all of his nearly thirty compositions were performed in Sweden in his lifetime, only one was played in public concert in his native country, Hungary. Trumpetmusette was composed for the Budapest Electroacoustic Music Festival of the Hungarian Radio, and was premiered there in 1994.

In 1997 he left his service of the Catholic Cathedral and moved with his private studio to Skogås, a suburb of Stockholm. It was in the same year that he finished one of his most concentrated works, De två med tre instrument (Two, with Three Instruments). In January 2005 he completed his last work, Orgelstycke nr III/a (Organ Piece Nr. III/a), going back to an idea conceived in the eighties. In February he still lived to see one of his biggest and most celebrated concerts. During five consecutive afternoons of the Stockholm New Music festival, were played his huge Gloria cycle preceded by Orgelstycke nr IV (Kyrie eleison), under the collective title Mässa (Mass). The Gloria cycle, an extensive musical setting of the corresponding liturgical text, was composed between 1989 and 2004, and requires some seven hours to perform.

In the summer of 2005, Rózmann was diagnosed with pancreatic cancer and died on 12 of August. In accordance with his own wish his ashes were scattered to the wind.

The uncompromising nature of Rózmann's character can easily be traced both in the reports about his behaviour and in his music. As a fervent devotee of his work, he shut himself up in windowless studios for hours, often working until late in the night. In his late years he did not participate in the events of official musical life, he did not even attend his own premieres. In his work, he looked neither for the approval of the professional, nor for the pleasure of the audience. The only thing that counted was the perfect articulation of his vision.

This vision was inspired by the (recorded) sound itself, originating from many different sources. As this raw material had been worked out and made to be specially plastic, an extremely powerful drama evolved, especially in Rózmann's large-scale works. A drama that reproduces the most basic conflicts of human existence, gives a shocking insight to its darkest depths, and shows that sin and purity, darkness and light walk side by side, their qualities mutually presupposing each other. The play is often elaborated in a symbolical and pictorial way with quotations from Buddhist and Christian liturgical music on one side, violent clashing, snarling and devilish laughter on the other. Put between these forces, the cry of the struggling human soul is heard.
