= Hungarian Wedding =

Hungarian movie

- Hungarian: Magyar menyegző
- Directed by: Csaba Káel
- Screenplay by: Miksa Békési
- Starring: Franciska Törőcsik, Tamás Kovács, Zsombor Kövesi
- Cinematography: Tamás Lajos
- Edited by: Lili Makk, Viktória Kiss
- Music by: István Pál "Szalonna"
- Production company: Szupermodern Stúdió
- Release date: January 22, 2026 (Hungary)
- Running time: 92 minutes
- Country: Hungary
- Languages: Hungarian, Romanian

Hungarian Wedding (Hungarian: Magyar menyegző) is a romantic musical folk dance film directed by Csaba Káel.

== Synopsis ==
Two students, András and Péter, travel to a Transylvanian wedding in the 1980s.

== Cast ==
- Franciska Törőcsik as Kati
- Tamás Kovács as Péter
- Zsombor Kövesi as András
- Barnabás Rahonyi as Gyuri
