= Fin de partie (opera) =

2018 opera by György Kurtág

- Opera by György Kurtág
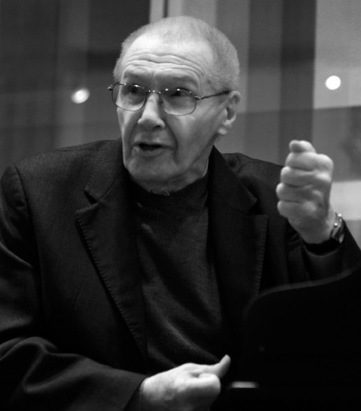
- Kurtág in 2014
- Librettist: György Kurtág
- Based on: Endgame by Samuel Beckett Roundelay by Samuel Beckett
- Premiere: 15 November 2018; La Scala, Milan

Fin de partie is a one-act opera by György Kurtág, set to a French libretto he himself adapted from the play of the same name (English title: Endgame) by Samuel Beckett and from Beckett's English-language poem Roundelay, which he uses at the start. Kurtág fully titled this work, his first opera, Samuel Beckett: Fin de partie: scènes et monologues, opéra en un acte. He dedicated it to the memory of "mon professeur Ferenc Farkas [and] mon ami Tamás Blum: qui, dans ma jeunesse, m'ont appri [sic] l'essentiel sur l'opéra [who, in my youth, taught me the essentials of opera]."

== History ==
The opera was originally commissioned by Alexander Pereira for the Salzburg Festival. It should have been performed there in 2013, but the composer could not complete the work in time.

The Teatro alla Scala, Milan, then managed by Pereira, staged the premiere on 15 November 2018. The director of the premiere production was Pierre Audi, with set and costume designs by Christof Hetzer, and lighting design by Urs Schönebaum. The premiere production was a joint production between La Scala and Dutch National Opera (DNO), Amsterdam. The DNO staged the opera in March 2019. The production travelled to Paris in April–May 2022. A new production was staged at the Vienna State Opera in October 2024.

On the recommendation of György Ligeti, Kurtág had seen a production of Beckett's play in Paris in 1957. This experience greatly affected Kurtág, which he described to the American music critic Jeremy Eichler as "one of the strongest experiences of my life". For his opera, Kurtág condensed the play, retaining around 60% of the French text. He has acknowledged his studies of the operas of Claudio Monteverdi as inspiration for his own opera.

The original commission for the work arrived in 2010 from La Scala. Kurtág initially wished there to be no contract and no commission fee. The Ernst von Siemens Music Foundation provided financial support for the commission. Kurtág spent eight years on the composition of the opera, with assistance from his wife Márta. Kurtág did not attend the world premiere performance because his frail health rendered him unable to travel from Budapest to Milan.

== Roles ==
Roles, voice types, premiere cast
Role	Voice type	Premiere cast, 15 November 2018 Conductor: Markus Stenz
Hamm	bass-baritone	Frode Olsen
Clov, Hamm's servant	baritone	Leigh Melrose
Nell, Hamm's mother	contralto	Hilary Summers
Nagg, Hamm's father	tenor buffo	Leonardo Cortellazzi

== Synopsis ==
The setting is a house by the sea, where four people reside:

- Hamm, an elderly gentleman who uses a wheelchair
- Clov, servant to Hamm, who cannot sit down
- Nagg and Nell, Hamm's very old parents, each trapped in a dustbin, without legs

The tensions between the four characters exasperate each of them:

- Hamm cannot abide his parents and their chatter.
- Nell can barely tolerate Nagg.
- Clov regards the others wearily.

All four wait for an end to the inertia and claustrophobia of their situation.

1. Prologue: Nell is the first character to appear, and delivers the setting of 'Roundelay' to begin the opera. Her words hazily allude to memories, with the sound of footsteps as the only sound to be heard on the beach.
2. Clov's Pantomime: Clov and Hamm appear. Clov is troubled and uneasy on his legs. He makes repetitive gestures, the same gestures every day, during his domestic chores, interspersed with short, nervous laughter.
3. Clov's First Monologue: Clov speaks of the possibility that the current situation may come to some sort of end soon.
4. Hamm's First Monologue: by contrast, Hamm thinks about his and his parents' sufferings. With feelings of despondency and exhaustion, he claims that he cannot resolve the current circumstances.
5. Bin: Nagg and Nell, both severely handicapped, are tired out from their long-term bickering, and their mutual incomprehension. During their conversation, they recall the cycling accident in the Ardennes that caused them both to lose their legs. Memories also surface of a boat trip on Lake Como. These memories are their sole happy memories and, at least superficially, give them a little nostalgia for their life spent together. Yet, Hamm, who wants to sleep, finds his parents' chatter irritating, and orders Clov to throw the bins, including Nagg and Nell, into the sea. Nell dies in the meantime, apparently unnoticed by the others.
6. Novel: Hamm wants to tell Nagg a story. In past days, a father had come to him on Christmas Eve asking for bread for his son. Hamm had decided to take him on.
7. Nagg's Monologue: Nagg remembers when Hamm was young and needed him.
8. Hamm's Penultimate Monologue: Hamm ponders his difficult relations with others.
9. Hamm and Clov's Dialogue: Hamm asks Clov for his tranquilliser. Clov replies that no tranquillisers are left.
10. "It's over, Clov" and Clov's Vaudeville: Hamm tells Clov that he no longer needs him, but then asks Clov to say something that he may remember before departing. Clov remarks that Hamm had never spoken to him until that moment. Only now, as he is about to leave, does Hamm pay any notice of him.
11. Clov's Last Monologue: Clov reflects on his condition. He has never understood what words like 'love' and 'friendship' mean. He also feels old, tired, and unable to form new habits. He is bound to his repetitive, never-changing daily routine.
12. Transition to the Finale: Hamm thanks Clov as Clov is about to leave.
13. Hamm's Last Monologue: Clov is about to leave, but has not yet moved. Hamm realises that he has been left alone.
14. Epilogue: Hamm grasps that it is now up to him – and him alone – to continue playing the endgame.

== Reception ==
Both Andrew Clements and Fiona Maddocks of The Guardian awarded Fin de partie a full five stars. Alex Ross wrote in The New Yorker that "it seems the equal of the celebrated text on which it is based. Beckett has been waiting for Kurtág all this time." The opera later ranked fourth in a poll by The Guardian of the greatest 21st century works of classical music.
