= Jenő Szervánszky =

Hungarian post-impressionist artist

Jenő Szervánszky (1906–2005) was a Hungarian Post-Impressionist artist.

== Life and career ==
=== Early life and education ===
Jenő Szervánszky studied with Oszkár Glatz at the College of Fine Arts in Budapest. He mentions in his autobiographical note that he eventually became Glatz's assistant, but does not add that this position was traditionally reserved for the most favoured and promising pupil.

=== Second World War ===
Although the Hungarian government officially proclaimed neutrality, they demonstrated every sympathy with Nazi objectives and eventually declared war on the allies in 1941. As an artist, Jenő Szervánszky was at first exempt from serving in the army but in 1944 he too was called up and served near to the Austrian border. After heavy losses on the Russian front, however, the government sued for peace but the country was occupied by the Germans in March, 1944. Eventually, on April 4, 1945 Budapest was liberated by the Soviet armed forces. Szervánszky's regiment was disbanded by a brigade of Soviet soldiers, and, after a short period of internment, were to be marched to the Soviet Union to work as slave-labour.

Szervánszky decided on the desperate gamble of not eating in order to starve himself into a state of weakness. Over the course of a few weeks he ate less and less. His physical state rapidly deteriorated to the extent that he weighed only thirty-eight kilos. His plan worked and he was released as of no practical use as a worker.

=== After the war ===
Between 1946 and 1951 Szervánszky did graphical work and drew pictures to illustrate news stories at a time when technology did not run to photographs in newspapers. In 1951 he began teaching at the College of Applied Arts.

=== Hungarian Revolution of 1956 ===
After the defeat of Germany, elections were held on November 4, 1945. They were won by the Small Landholders' Party led by Zoltán Tildy. A republic was proclaimed, and Tildy was elected president. A coalition cabinet was formed, with Ferenc Nagy, a prominent member of the Small Landholders' Party, as Premier and Mátyás Rákosi, the General Secretary of the Hungarian Communist party, as Vice-Premier. A period of political instability followed the war but the hardliner Mátyás Rákosi eventually became prime minister. The communists took power, supported by the Soviet Union, while opponents of the communist regime were sent to labour camps.

After the death of Joseph Stalin in March, 1953, the Soviets followed somewhat more liberal policies. This so-called “New Course” was support by Imre Nagy, who had become the Hungarian leader and, for a while, life in Hungary held the promise of being easier. By 1955, however, Nagy had been ousted by more hardline leaders such as Ernő Gerő.

In the spring of 1956, the new Soviet leader Nikita Khrushchev denounced the extremes of Stalin's former regime. This encouraged dissidents in Hungary to call for more freedom. Intellectuals and students demanded reforms and openly called for the withdrawal of the Soviet military from Hungarian territory. What began as massive demonstrations escalated on October 23 to riots with the police. Even though many of the communist supporters deserted the government, the Prime Minister, Gerő appealed to the Soviet Union for help. In the face of overwhelmingly superior forces, the dissidents in their turn appealed to the United Nations for assistance. Their call was ignored, and the revolution was crushed.

Although Szervánszky never actively fought for the dissidents cause, he certainly supported them. Although the official reason for his dismissal from the College of Applied Arts in 1957 was for some staff “re-structuring”, he believed he was simply dismissed because of his political beliefs. He never worked for any institution again.

A new Communist dictatorship was set up, and János Kádár was installed as the head of government. Punishment of the dissidents, however, continued throughout 1957 and 1958, and thousands were deported to Soviet labour camps. Kádár remained firmly in control of Hungary for the next thirty years and it was not until 1967 that he relaxed the firm control of the USSR and was able to give Hungary the reputation of the most relaxed and liberal of all the Soviet Union satellites.

== Later years ==
For the last forty years of his life, Szervánszky played almost no part in the public artistic community of his country. Totally devoid of ambition, he never sought to re-establish himself with the establishment, either as a teacher or an artist. He set his own goals and his own standards and, for him, the daily search for artistic truth was all the stimulus he needed. The few people who did buy paintings from him during the last thirty years of his life did so primarily because they came to his studio through personal introductions.

He died in London on March 20, 2005. He was cremated in London and his ashes were buried in the family grave in Budapest on May 31, 2005.

Jenő Szervánszky is the father of the pianist, Valéria Szervánszky and the brother of the composer, Endre Szervánszky and violinist, Péter Szervánszky.
