= Péter Szervánszky =

Hungarian violinist

Péter Szervánszky (24 September 1913, Kispest – 27 March 1985, Budapest) was a Hungarian violinist.

On 5 January 1944, Szervánszky gave the first performance in Hungary of Béla Bartók's 2nd violin concerto, in which he played the tutti ending of the concerto. Bartók had already left Hungary for the United States and left the score with the eminent musicologist Bence Szabolcsi. Péter performed the work with the Székesfövarosi Orchestra, conducted by János Ferencsik.

Szervánszky is the brother of the artist Jenő Szervánszky and the composer Endre Szervánszky, and uncle of the pianist Valéria Szervánszky.
