= Stele (Kurtág) =

1994 orchestral work by György Kurtág

- by György Kurtág
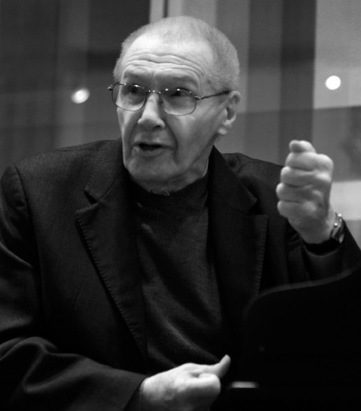
- Kurtág in 2014 by Lenke Szilágyi
- Native name: ΣΤΉΛΗ
- Opus: 33
- Genre: Contemporary music
- Composed: 1993–1994
- Dedication: Claudio Abbado; Berlin Philharmonic
- Published: 2003: Budapest
- Movements: Three
- Scoring: Large orchestra

Premiere
- Date: 14 December 1994
- Location: Berlin
- Conductor: Claudio Abbado
- Performers: Berlin Philharmonic

Stele, Op. 33, sometimes also stylised in Greek capitals as ΣΤΉΛΗ (stēlē), is a composition for orchestra by Hungarian composer György Kurtág. It was completed in 1994.

== Composition ==
The composition was first conceived as a work for piano in 1993, which was dedicated to András Mihály. Kurtág completed the orchestral score as a commission of the Berlin Philharmonic in 1994, while he was the composer-in-residence for the orchestra. The piece was premiered in Berlin, on 14 December 1994, by the Berlin Philharmonic under Claudio Abbado, both of these being the dedicatees. It was published in 2003 by Editio Musica Budapest.

== Music ==
Stele is in three movements and takes up to thirteen minutes to perform. The three movements are untitled and are usually referenced by their tempo. All of the movements are meant to be played attacca. The movements are:

1. Larghissimo – Adagio
2. Lamentoso – Disperato, con moto. Nicht zu schnell aber wild, gehetzt, ungeduldig (Note: This Italian/German description roughly translates to "Desperate, in motion. Not too fast but wild, rushed (or "hounded"), impatient".)
3. Molto sostenuto

The final version of the score also includes a 2006 addition to the ending of the score which changes the last bar of the last movement and adds four more bars, extending the last notes played by the instruments. So far, both endings are accepted, even though the first one is still recorded more frequently.

=== Instrumentation ===
The work is scored for a very large orchestra.

Woodwinds
4 flutes
1 alto flute
1 bass flute
3 oboes
1 English horn
4 clarinets in B♭
1 bass clarinet in B♭
1 contrabass clarinet in B♭
3 bassoons
1 contrabassoon

Brass
4 French horns
2 tenor tubas in B♭
2 bass tubas in F
4 trumpets in C
4 trombones
1 contrabass tuba

Keyboard instruments
1 cimbalom
1 celesta
1 grand piano
1 upright piano
1 marimba
1 vibraphone

Percussion (4 players)
1 triangle (piccolo)
5 cymbals
1 tam-tam
2 bongos
2 log drums
2 bass drums
1 snare drum
1 tambourine
1 whip
bells (C, F, A♭)

timpani

Strings
2 harps
16 violin I
14 violin II
14 viola
12 cellos
12 double basses

== Recordings ==
- In December 1994, the dedicatees Claudio Abbado and the Berlin Philharmonic recorded the piece for Deutsche Grammophon. It was recorded in the Large Hall of the Berliner Philharmonie.
- On 26 November 1996, the Southwest German Radio Symphony Orchestra conducted by Michael Gielen recorded the work at the Konzerthaus Freiburg for BMG Music. This recording was later reissued by Hänssler.
