= Müpa Budapest =

Art museum and concert hall in Budapest, Hungary

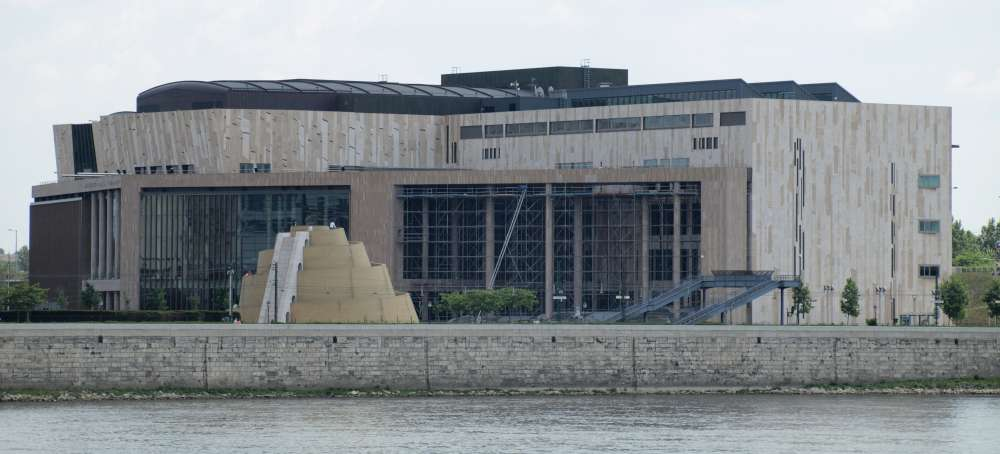

- Location within Budapest
- Former names: Palace of Arts (Művészetek Palotája)
- Address: 1095 Budapest, Komor Marcell u. 1.
- Location: Budapest, Hungary
- Coordinates: 47°28′10″N 19°4′18″E
- Type: Performing arts center, Museum
- Public transit: H6, H7 suburban railway

Construction
- Built: 2002–2005
- Opened: 14 March 2005
- Architects: Zoboki, Demeter és Társaik Építésziroda
- General contractors: Trigránit, Arcadom Építőipari Zrt.

Tenants
- Müpa Budapest Nonprofit Kft., Ludwig Museum

Website
- www.mupa.hu/en

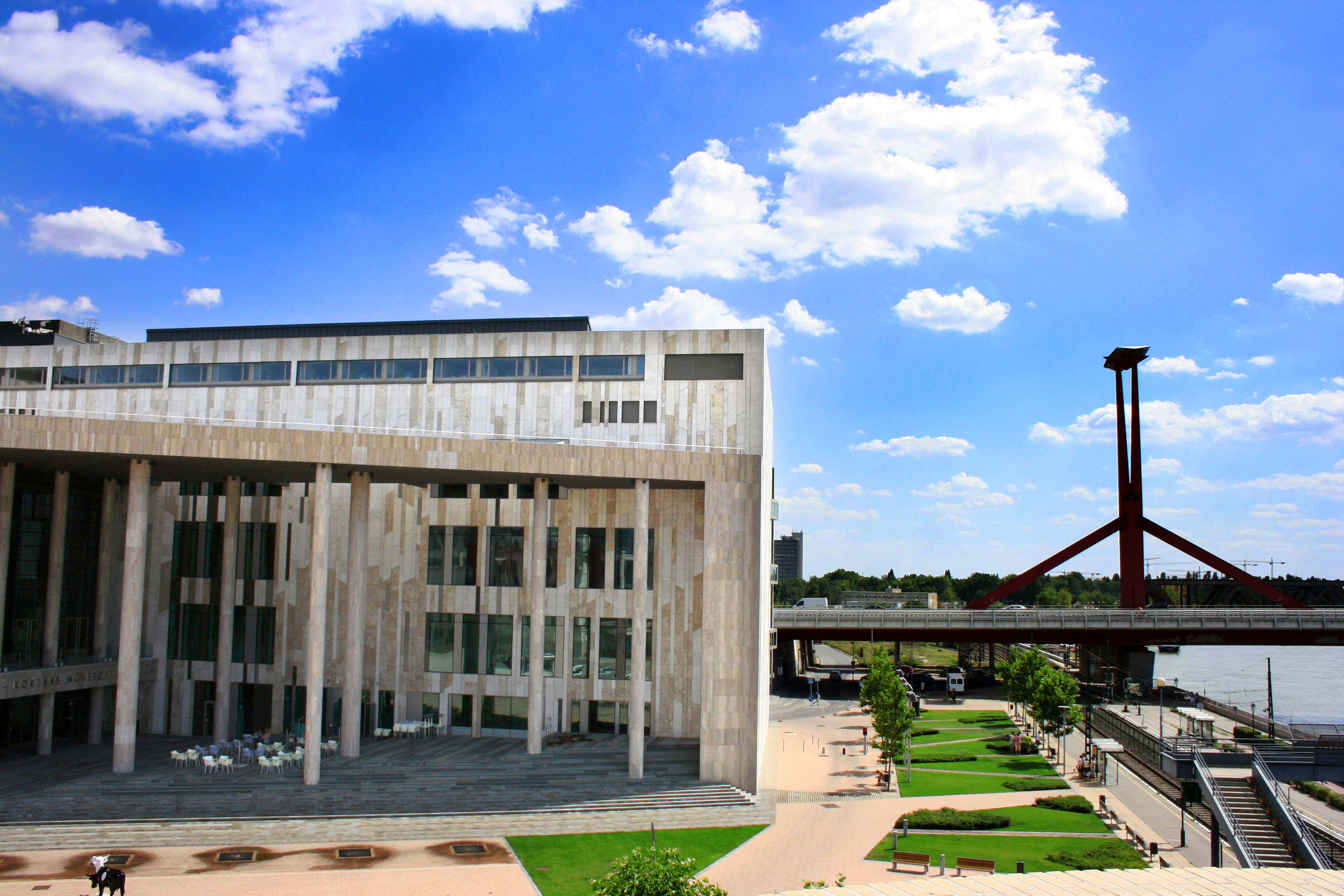
The left wing of Müpa Budapest, including the Ludwig Museum

Müpa Budapest (between 2005 and 2015 Palace of Arts – Művészetek Palotája in Hungarian [ˈmyːveːsɛtɛk ˈpɒlotaːjɒ]) is a building in Ferencváros, Budapest, Hungary, officially opened in March 2005. It is located near Rákóczi Bridge and was designed by Zoboki, Demeter and Partners Architectural Office. The National Theatre, which opened in 2002, is located next to it.

Both Müpa Budapest and the National Theatre are part of the new Millennium City Center being created in Budapest.

The structure of Müpa Budapest covers a ground area of 10,000 m^{2} and the total floor space of the building is 70,000 m^{2}. Its three institutions, the concert hall, the Festival Theatre and the Ludwig Museum, were built in parallel over 28 months. It received the Prix d’Excellence of FIABCI in 2006. It also won the FIABCI audience award in 2007.

The general manager is Csaba Kael.

== Performing arts and other facilities ==
- Bartók National Concert Hall is 25 m high, 25 m wide and 52 m long, and seats 1,656 people, including 126 seats on the podium and 60 standing places in the side galleries. The concert hall features acoustics designed by Russell Johnson, who told the Wall Street Journal "in two or three years’ time, Hungarian musicians (will) say this was the best concert hall in the world". The acoustics can be adjusted with 58 movable resonance chambers and a suspended 42-tonne canopy. The organ of the concert hall, inaugurated on 22 May 2006, has 92 stops and 5 manuals as well as 470 wooden pipes, 5028 tin pipes and 1214 reed pipes. The extensive intonation period of the organ lasted 10 months. It was built by the German firm Orgelbau Mühleisen together with the Pécs Organ Building Manufactory. It is one of the largest organs in Europe. A fully playable virtual version of this pipe organ was developed for use with Hauptwerk in 2008.
- Ludwig Museum This is a state of the art Contemporary Art Museum with paintings by Picasso ("Musketeer with Sword"), David Hockney, Tom Wesselman, Richard Estes ("Rappaport Pharmacy") plus paintings by these modern Hungarian masters; Imre Bukta ("Officers at Pig Feast"), Laszlo Feher, and Imre Bak. There are also creations by Claes Oldenburg ("Lingerie Counter"), Yoko Ono, and Markus Lüpertz.
- Festival Theatre The Festival Theatre, in the Eastern third of the Palace of Arts building, seats 452 and also has the most modern technology.
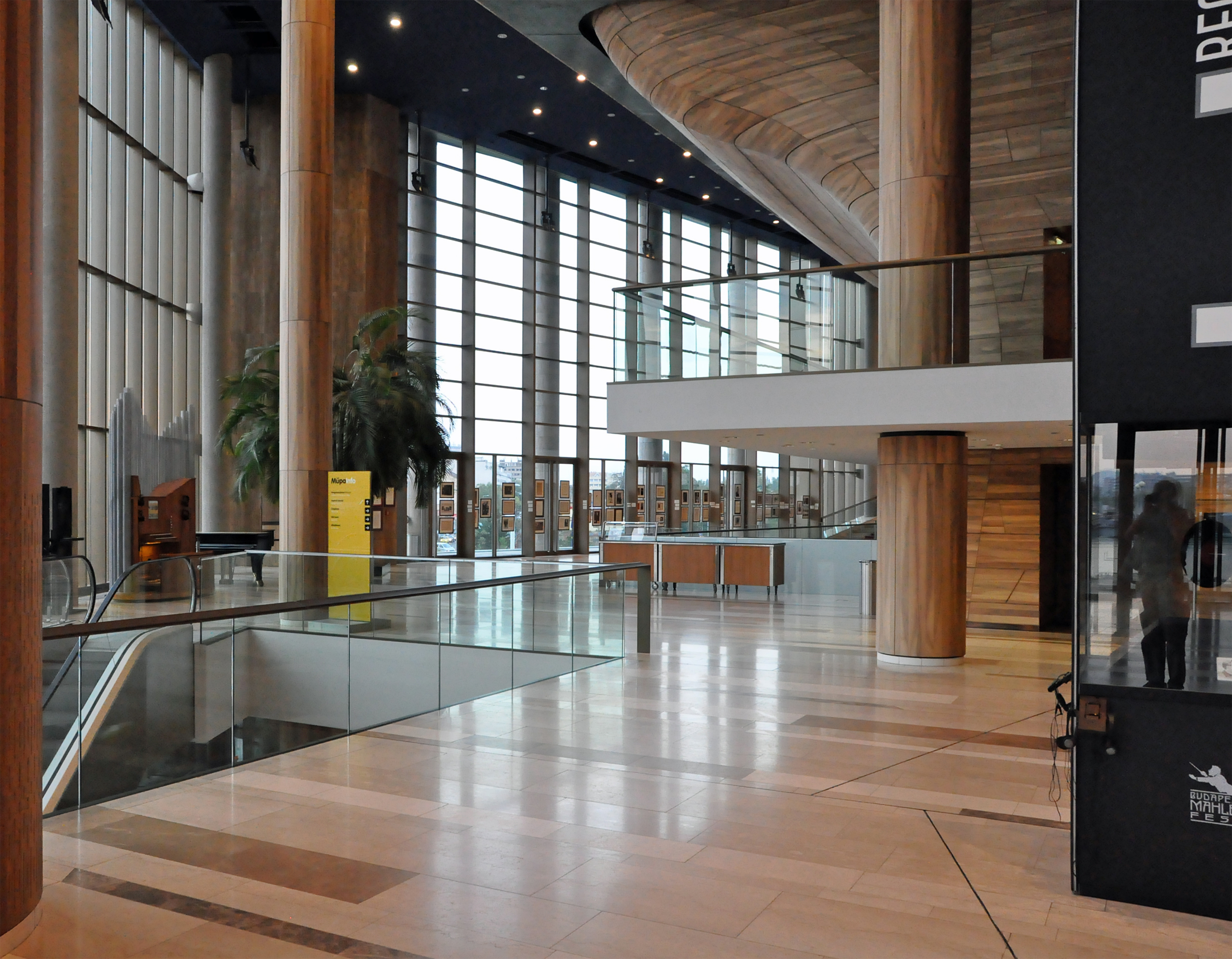
Interior of Müpa Budapest

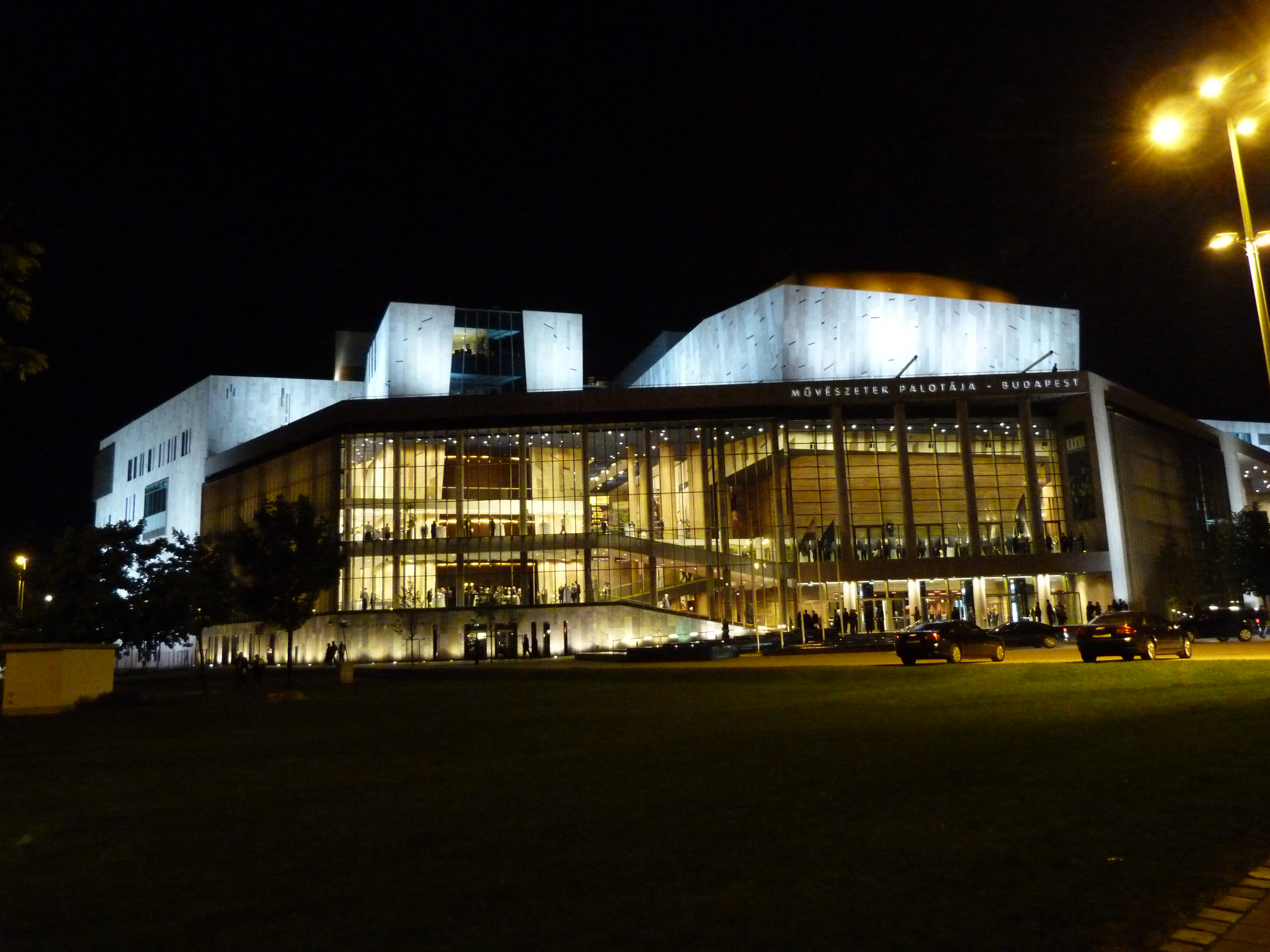
at night

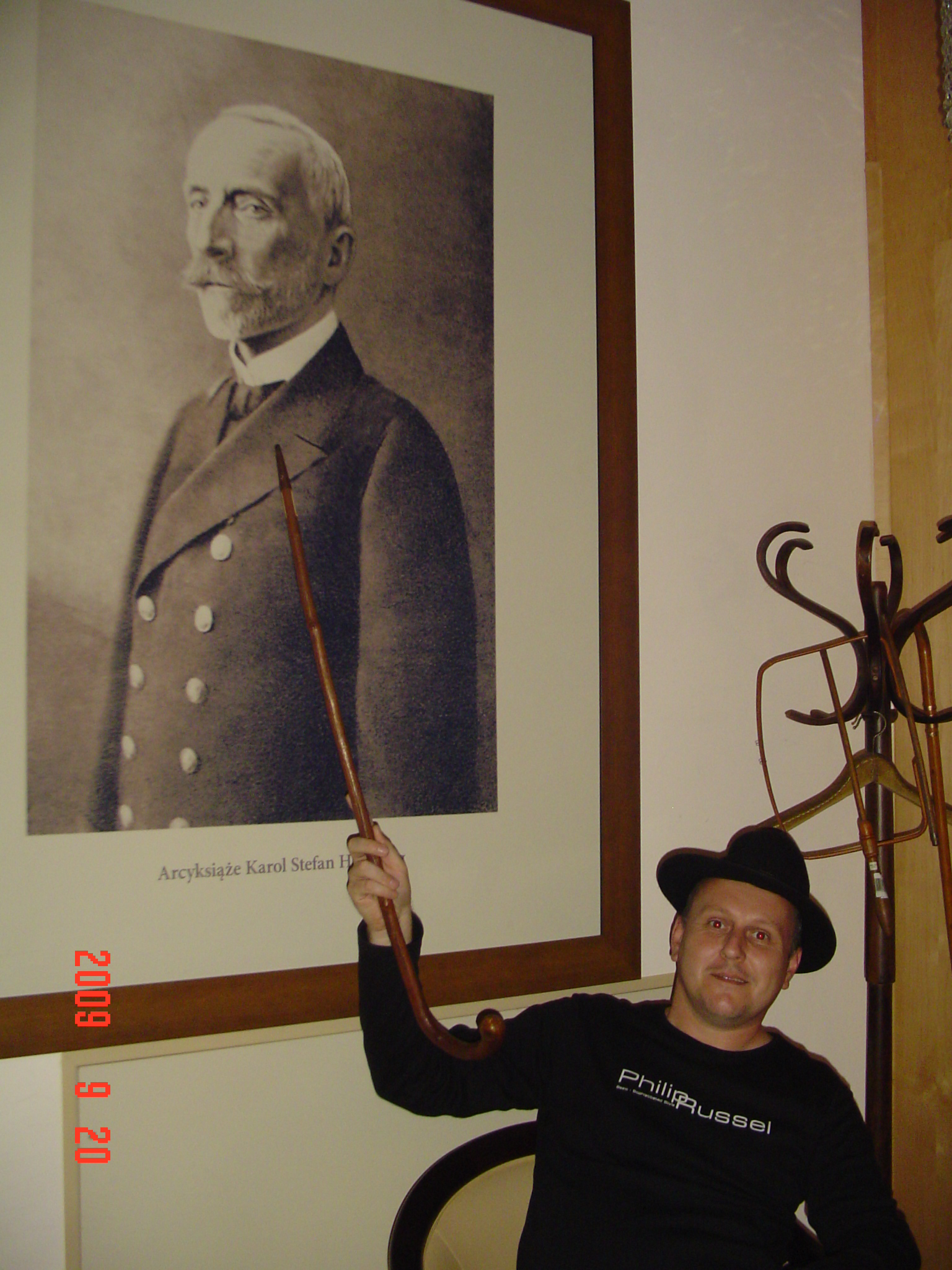
Interior of Müpa Budapest

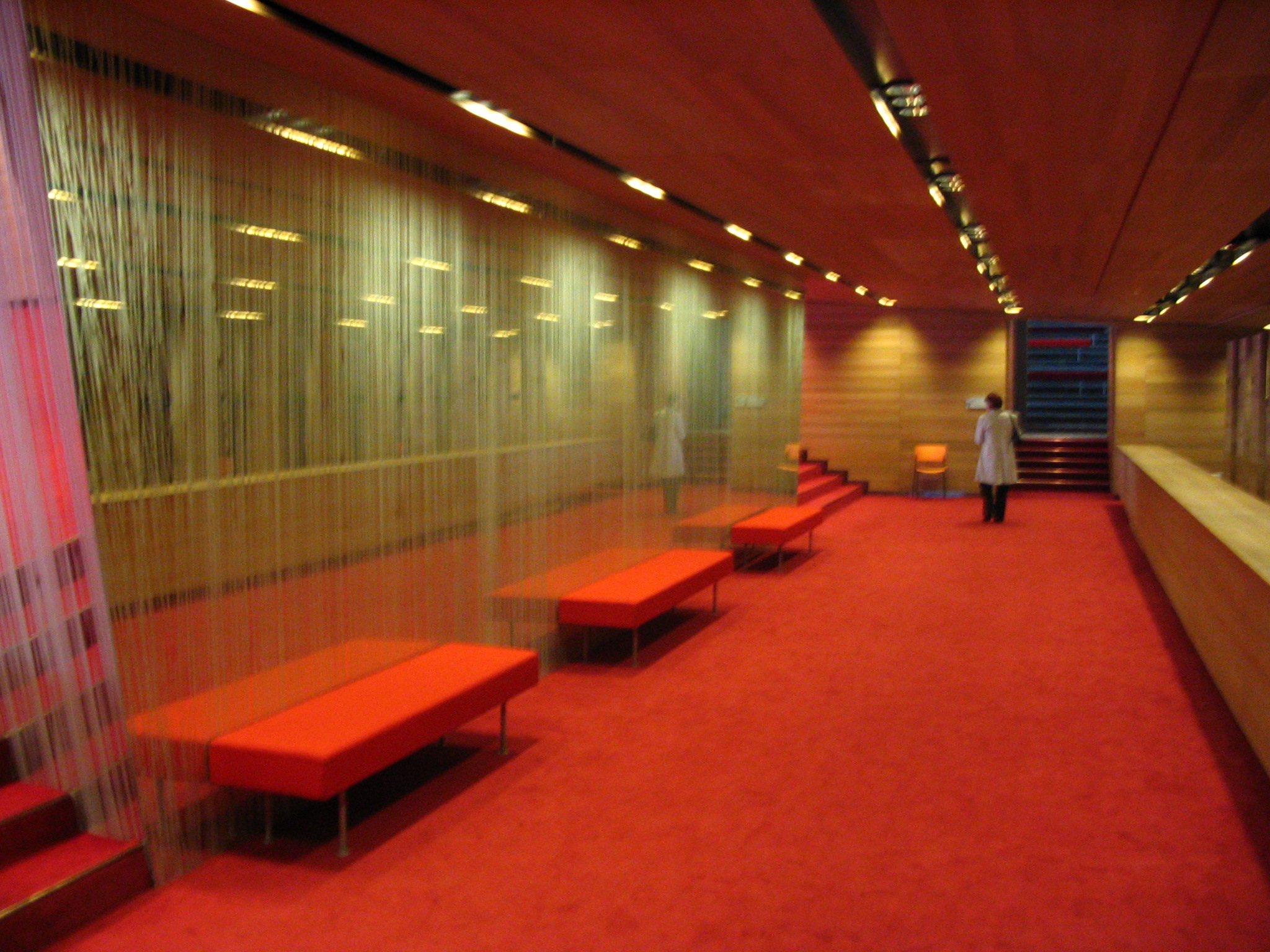
Interior of Müpa Budapest

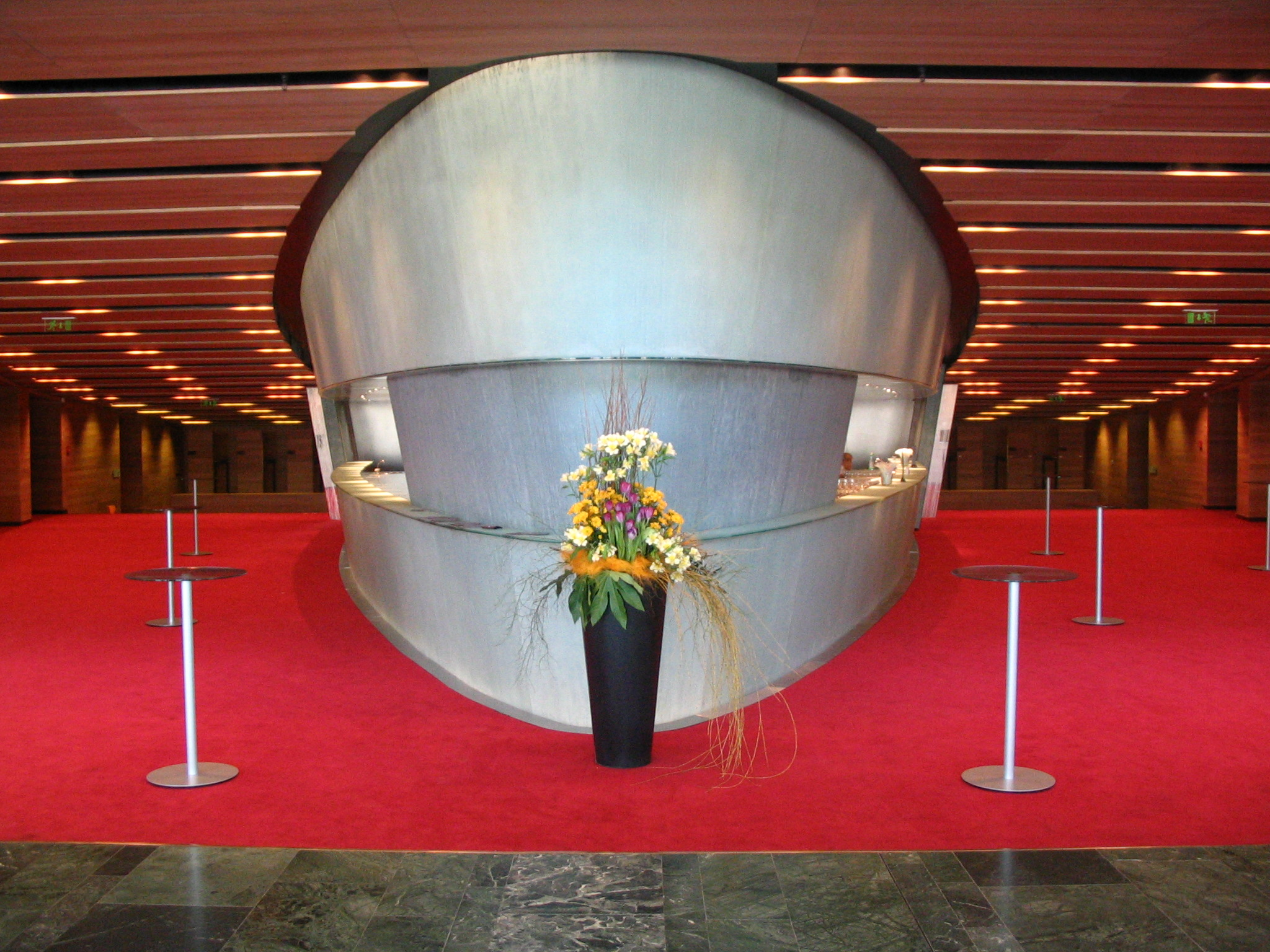
Interior of Müpa Budapest
