= Csaba Káel =

Hungarian film director and CEO (born 1961)

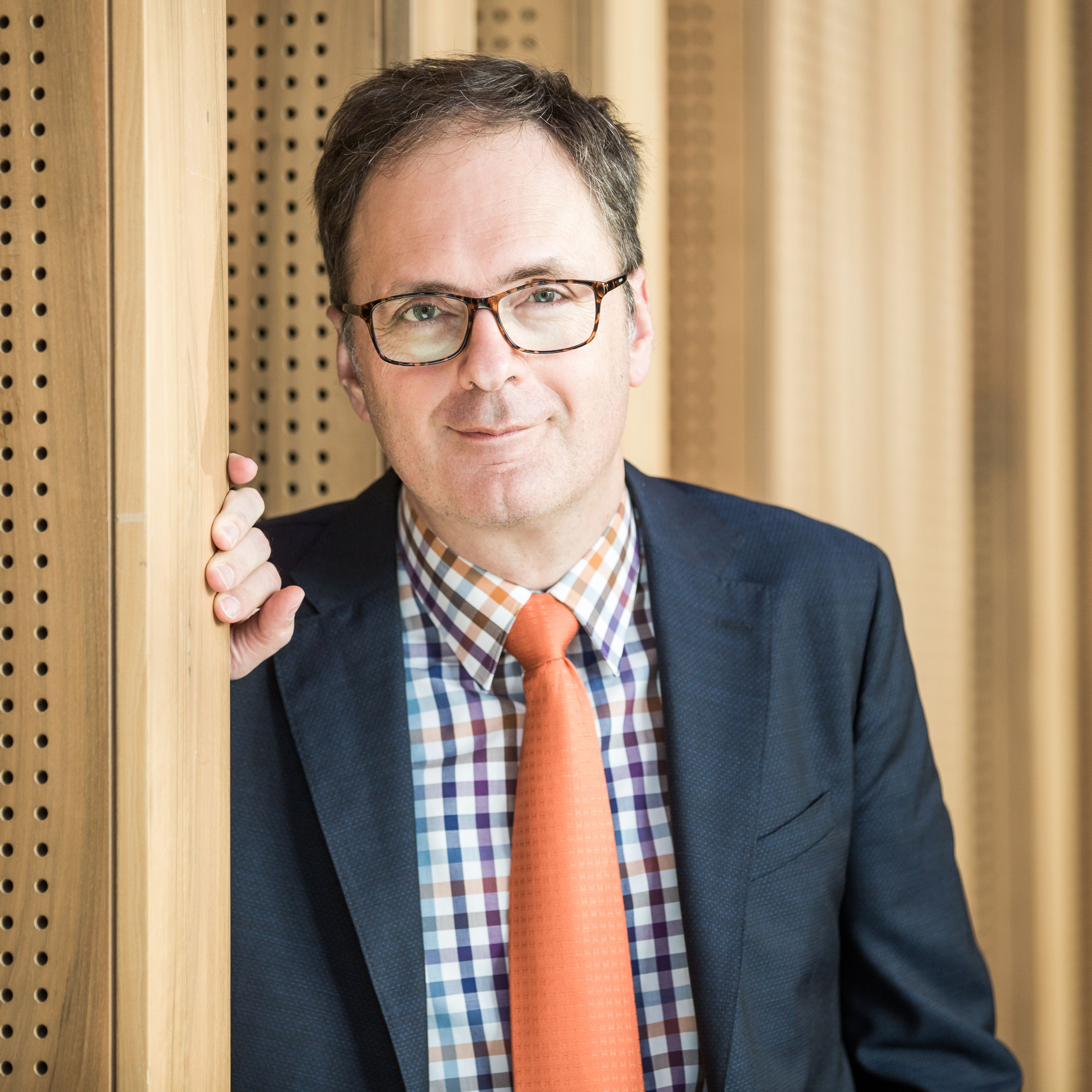
Káel, CEO of Müpa Budapest (2016)

Csaba Káel (born 8 June 1961 in Miskolc) is a Hungarian film director and CEO of Müpa Budapest. He was awarded the Kossuth Prize in 2020 and the Kálmán Nádasdy Prize in 2013.

== Career ==
Káel earned a degree in structural and architectural engineering in 1986 from the Technical University of Budapest's Department of Structural Engineering. In 1989, he graduated from Budapest's College of Theatre and Film Arts, where he studied film and television directing under teachers Károly Makk, István Szabó, Gyula Gazdag, Elemér Ragályi and György Illés.

After serving as a manager at the Balázs Béla Film Studio from 1989 and 1990, he went on to work at Novofilm Kft between 1990 and 1993. In 1990, he took part in the East-West Producers Seminar in London under the tutelage of Lynda Myles and David Puttnam. In 1990, he founded the Happy End Advertising Agency, later becoming its creative director. A member of the Association of Independent Hungarian Producers from 1995 to 1998, he became founder and executive director of Z+ Hungarian Music Television. In 2001 and 2002, he served as artistic advisor for the Millenéris Theatre and Television Studio, where he developed the core concept for that institution. Starting in 2002, he spent two years back at the (by then) University of Theatre and Film Arts working on his DLA before joining Müpa Budapest in 2005 as an artistic advisor responsible for putting together the institution's opera programmes. Following a stint at the Novus School of Art from 2006 to 2007, he has been teaching at the Werk Academy since 2008. He has been the CEO of Müpa Budapest since 17 March 2011, and between 2013 and 2020 he was appointed chairman of the body that runs both the Budapest Spring Festival and the CAFe Budapest Contemporary Arts Festival. Káel has been a member of the European Academy of Sciences and Arts since 2014 On 1 September 2019 he was appointed government commissioner for the advancement of the Hungarian cinema industry and the National Film Institute was founded under his leadership. In 2020 he was elected as a member of the International Academy of Television Arts & Sciences (IATAS), the organization which presents the International Emmy Awards, often described as the “Oscar of television industry”. In 2021 the Bartók Spring International Art Weeks and the Liszt Fest International Cultural Festival were founded with his direction.

== Filmography ==
- 1986 Fradika (documentary film about Ferencváros Football Club)
- 1987 Nem [Humdrum] (short film drama)
- 1987 Hagyományainkból [From Our Traditions] (dance film with the Kodály Dance Ensemble)
- 1988 A másik szoba [The Other Room] (television drama)
- 1989 Az új generáció választása [The Choice of the New Generation]
- 1991 What about H? (short Danish-Hungarian film drama)
- 1991–1993 Novomoda (fashion programme series broadcast on Hungarian television)
- 1993 Elindultam szép hazámból [I Left My Beautiful Homeland] (film portrait of opera singer Ilona Tokody)
- 1994 Kötéltáncos a szocializmusban [Walking the Tightrope in the Era of Socialism] (film portrait of Tibor Liska)
- 1995 Szól a világ [The Sound of the World] (dance film of Béla Bartók's Romanian Folk Dances)
- 2000 Film on Hungary at Hungary's pavilion at the Hannover World's Fair
- 2003 Bánk bán (film drama)
- 2005 Bartók 2005 (documentary film on Béla Bartók)
- 2006 Orgona Ünnep – Párizs [Organ Celebration – Paris] (documentary film on the Paris organ festival)
- 2006-2007 Szalon [Salon] (cultural fashion series broadcast on Duna Television)
- 2007 Mester és a tanítványok [The Master and his Apprentices] (six-part documentary film series on camera operator György Illés and his students)
- 2008 Mert én itt születtem [Because I Was Born Here] (documentary film)
- 2008 Kézjegy [Hallmark] (film portrait of composer László Dubrovay)
- 2010 Image film for the Hungarian pavilion at the Shanghai World Expo
- 2013 Munkácsy (two-part documentary film about Mihály Munkácsy)
- 2015 Gyurika – Egy pólós vallomásai [Gyurika – Confessions of a water polo player] (film portrait of water polo player György Kárpáti)
- 2026 Hungarian Wedding
- 1987-2010 More than 600 film trailers
- 1987-2010 28 music video clips

== Festivals ==
His creative works have been screened and performed at events in the following cities and towns: Los Angeles, New York, Chicago, Palm Springs, Portland, Minneapolis, Cleveland, Philadelphia, Washington, D.C. (USA); Palić (Serbia); Jerusalem (Israel); Singapore; Łódź (Poland); Calcutta, Mumbai, Madras, Pune, Trivandrum (India); Istanbul (Turkey); Dhaka (Bangladesh); Barcelona (Spain); Lima (Peru); Tokyo (Japan)

== Prosaic and musical theatre works ==
- 1999 Mozart: Così fan tutte (Budapest Castle District Hilton Hotel, Dominican Court)
- 2000 Haydn: L’infedeltá delusa (Infidelity Outwitted) (Hungarian State Opera)
- 2001 Levente Gyöngyösi: The Stork Caliph (Millenáris Theatre)
- 2001 Pinsuti: Mattea Corvino (Millenáris Theatre)
- 2001 Europe Opera Gala (Hungarian State Opera)
- 2002 Ferenc Erkel: Bánk Bán (Hungarian State Opera)
- 2002 New Year's Opera Gala with Jose Cura (Hungarian State Opera)
- 2003 Mozart: Die Entführung aus dem Serail (Hungarian State Opera)
- 2005 Monteverdi: L’Orfeo (Müpa Budapest, inaugural performance of the Festival Theatre)
- 2005 Charpentier: Acteon
- 2005 Purcell: Dido and Aeneas (Müpa Budapest, Festival Theatre)
- 2006 Mozart: The Magic Flute (Müpa Budapest, Béla Bartók National Concert Hall)
- 2006 Verdi: La traviata (Müpa Budapest, Béla Bartók National Concert Hall)
- 2007 Verdi: Il trovatore (Müpa Budapest, Béla Bartók National Concert Hall)
- 2007 Rameau: Pygmalion (Miskolc International Opera Festival)
- 2007 Verdi: La Forza di Destino (Müpa Budapest, Béla Bartók National Concert Hall)
- 2008 Puccini: Madama Butterfly (Müpa Budapest, Béla Bartók National Concert Hall)
- 2008 Mascagni: Cavelleria Rusticana, Leoncavallo: Pagliacci (National Theatre of Győr)
- 2008 Puccini: La bohème (Müpa Budapest, Béla Bartók National Concert Hall)
- 2008 Puccini: La fanciulla del West (Müpa Budapest, Béla Bartók National Concert Hall)
- 2008 The Three Tenors – Opera Gala (Miskolc International Opera Festival)
- 2009 Andrea Rost – Opera Gala (Müpa Budapest, Béla Bartók National Concert Hall)
- 2009 Purcell: The Faerie Queene (Müpa Budapest, Béla Bartók National Concert Hall)
- 2009 Ferenc Erkel: László Hunyadi (National Theatre of Győr)
- 2010 Marlowe: Dr. Faustus (Budapest Chamber Tivoli Theatre)
- 2010 Donizetti: L'elisir d'amore (Müpa Budapest, Béla Bartók National Concert Hall)
- 2011 Mozart: The Magic Flute (Iseum Open-Air Festival, Szombathely)
- 2012 Bizet: Carmen (National Theatre of Győr)
- 2012 Handel: Hercules (Müpa Budapest, Béla Bartók National Concert Hall)
- 2012 Mozart: Die Entführung aus dem Serail (Royal Opera House, Muscat)
- 2012 Donizetti: Don Pasquale (Veszprém Festival)
- 2012 Mozart: The Marriage of Figaro (Iseum Open-Air Festival, Szombathely)
- 2012 Ramón Vargas Opera Gala (Müpa Budapest, Béla Bartók National Concert Hall)
- 2012 Tchaikovsky: Onegin (Müpa Budapest, Béla Bartók National Concert Hall)
- 2013 Ibn Battuta, the Prince of Travellers (Bahrain National Theatre, Manama)
- 2013 Verdi: Attila (Shanghai Grand Theatre, Shanghai; Müpa Budapest, Béla Bartók National Concert Hall)
- 2013 Donizetti: Don Pasquale (Opera on Wheels) (Hungarian State Opera)
- 2014 Verdi: La traviata (Iseum Open-Air Festival)
- 2014 Handel: Alexander's Feast (Lithuanian National Opera and Ballet Theatre, Vilnius; Müpa Budapest, Béla Bartók National Concert Hall)
- 2015 Károly Goldmark: Die Königin von Saba (Margaret Island Open-Air Theatre, Hungarian State Opera)
- 2016 Donizetti: Don Pasquale (Erkel Theatre, Budapest)
- 2016 Bartók: Bluebeard's Castle (CAFe Budapest Contemporary Arts Festival; Shanghai China International Arts Festival)
- 2016 Rossini: The Barber of Seville (Iseum Open Air Festival, Szombathely; Zemplén Festival, Tokaj; Müpa Budapest, Béla Bartók National Concert Hall)
- 2018 Péter Eötvös: Senza sangue / Bartók: Bluebeard's Castle (Müpa Budapest, Béla Bartók National Concert Hall)
- 2018 Bartók: Bluebeard's Castle (Lithuanian National Opera, Vilnius)
- 2018 Franz Lehár: Das Land des Lächelns (Shanghai Opera House; Müpa Budapest, Béla Bartók National Concert Hall)
- 2018 Operettgála Kálmán Imre emlékére (Bolsoj Színház, Moszkva)
- 2019 Puccini: Le Villi; Crisantemi (Müpa Budapest, Béla Bartók National Concert Hall; Kodály Centre)
- 2019 Jenő Kenessey: The Gold and the Woman; István Örkény – Tóth Péter: The Tót Family (Hungarian State Opera, Eiffel Art Studios)
- 2019 Puccini: Le Villi (65th Festival Puccini, Torre del Lago)
- 2019 Károly Goldmark: Die Königin von Saba (Tel Aviv Performing Arts Center; a production of Hungarian State Opera)

== Work as an opera director ==
Káel has worked with such artists as José Cura, Leo Nucci, Éva Marton, Ruggerio Raimondi, Renato Bruson, Erika Miklósa, Andrea Rost, Roberto Scandiuzzi, Joseph Calleja, Giuseppe Sabbatini, Ildiko Komlósi, Michaela Kaune, Elena Mosuc, Roberto Saccà, Marcello Giordani, Kurt Rydl, Ramón Vargas, Yevgeny Nesterenko, Pier Giorgio Morandi, Deborah Voigt, Christoph Eschenbach, Ferruccio Furlanetto. He has staged several pre-classical operas in productions by the Purcell Chorus and Orfeo Orchestra conducted by György Vashegyi, including Monteverdi's L’Orfeo, the inaugural performance at Müpa Budapest's Festival Theatre.

== Events and other works ==
- 1992, 1993, 1994 Postabank Tennis Gala, Budapest Sports Arena (principal director)
- 1999 Ceremony marking the transfer of the Holy Crown of Saint Stephen to the parliament building (principal director)
- 1999, 2000, 2001 Remembrance Day, November 4., Saint Stephen's Basilica (director)
- 2000 Millennial Fireworks (concept, principal director)
- 2000 Inauguration ceremony for the president of the Republic of Hungary (principal director)
- 2000 Show ringing in the new millennium, Budapest (director)
- 2000 The Hungarian Millennium at the Olympics – Cultural Festival in Sydney
- 2001 IAAF World Youth Championships, opening gala, Debrecen (director)
- 2001 An Evening of Hungarian Culture, Folger Shakespeare Library, Washington, D.C.
- 2005 Mozart Fashion Show, Müpa Budapest, Budapest
- 2007 Sziráczky Fashion Show, Millenáris, Budapest
- 2008 BlackRock Tennis Classics, László Papp Budapest Sports Arena, Budapest
- 2009-2010 Tennis Classics, László Papp Budapest Sports Arena, Budapest
- 2009 Event celebrating the 800th anniversary of the founding of the Franciscan Order, Müpa Budapest (director)
- 2009 Beethoven's Symphony No. 9, Miskolc International Opera Festival, Ice Arena
- 2010 Concert by the organist of the Cathedral of Notre Dame de Paris, Müpa Budapest (director)
- 2010 European Capital of Culture, Pécs 2010, opening ceremony, Pécs (director)
- 2016 Concert of Plácido Domingo, László Papp Budapest Sports Arena, Budapest (director)
- 2016 Polish–Hungarian Cultural Season, opening ceremony, Teatr Polski, Warsaw (director)
- 2017 17th FINA World Championships, opening and closing ceremony, Budapest (director) / Bea World 2017 – Best Events Award: Live Entertainment 1st Prize, Opening/Celebration 2nd Prize
- 2021 Hungary, the Land of Virgin Mary (52nd International Eucharistic Congress, Budapest)

== Awards ==
- Award for Music Video of the Year – Bonanza Banzai (1991)
- Golden Frog Award – Camerimage Film Festival, Łódź (2003)
- Béla Bartók Memorial Prize (2008)
- Award for Hungarian Arts (2011)
- Tony Curtis Award (2011)
- Pro-Turizmo Award (2012)
- Kálmán Nádasdy Award (2013)
- Meritorious Artist of Hungary (2017)
- Culture and Tourism Ambassador of Budapest (2018)
- Commander's Cross of the Order of Merit of the Hungarian Republic (civil division) (2018)
- Chevalier of the Legion of Honour (2018)
- Kossuth Prize (2020)
