= Márta Kurtág =

Hungarian pianist and teacher (1927–2019)

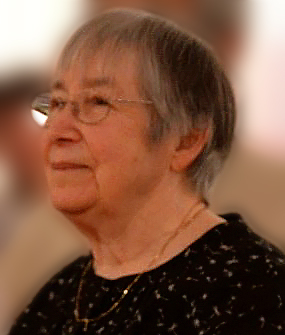
- in 2014
- Born: Márta Kinsker; 1 October 1927; Esztergom, Hungary
- Died: 17 October 2019 (aged 92); Budapest
- Occupations: Classical pianist; Academic piano teacher
- Organization: Franz Liszt Academy of Music
- Spouse: György Kurtág (m. 1947)

Márta Kurtág (Hungarian: [ˈmaːrtɒ ˈkurtaːɡ]; née Kinsker; 1 October 1927 − 17 October 2019) was a Hungarian classical pianist and academic piano teacher. She was the wife of György Kurtág, with whom she performed for 60 years, including at international festivals. They often played from his collection Játékok, which they also recorded together.

== Life ==
Márta Kurtág was born in Esztergom. She studied piano with András Mihály and Leó Weiner. She met her future husband, György Kurtág, in Budapest, where he had moved in 1946 to study at the Franz Liszt Academy of Music. They married in 1947, and their son György was born in 1954. György Kurtág received his degree in composition in 1955. Márta Kurtág taught at the Béla Bartók Music High School in Budapest from 1953 to 1963.

Following the Hungarian uprising in 1956, the couple lived in Paris from 1957 to 1958, where he studied with Max Deutsch, Olivier Messiaen, and Darius Milhaud. She taught music pedagogy at the Franz Liszt Academy from 1972.

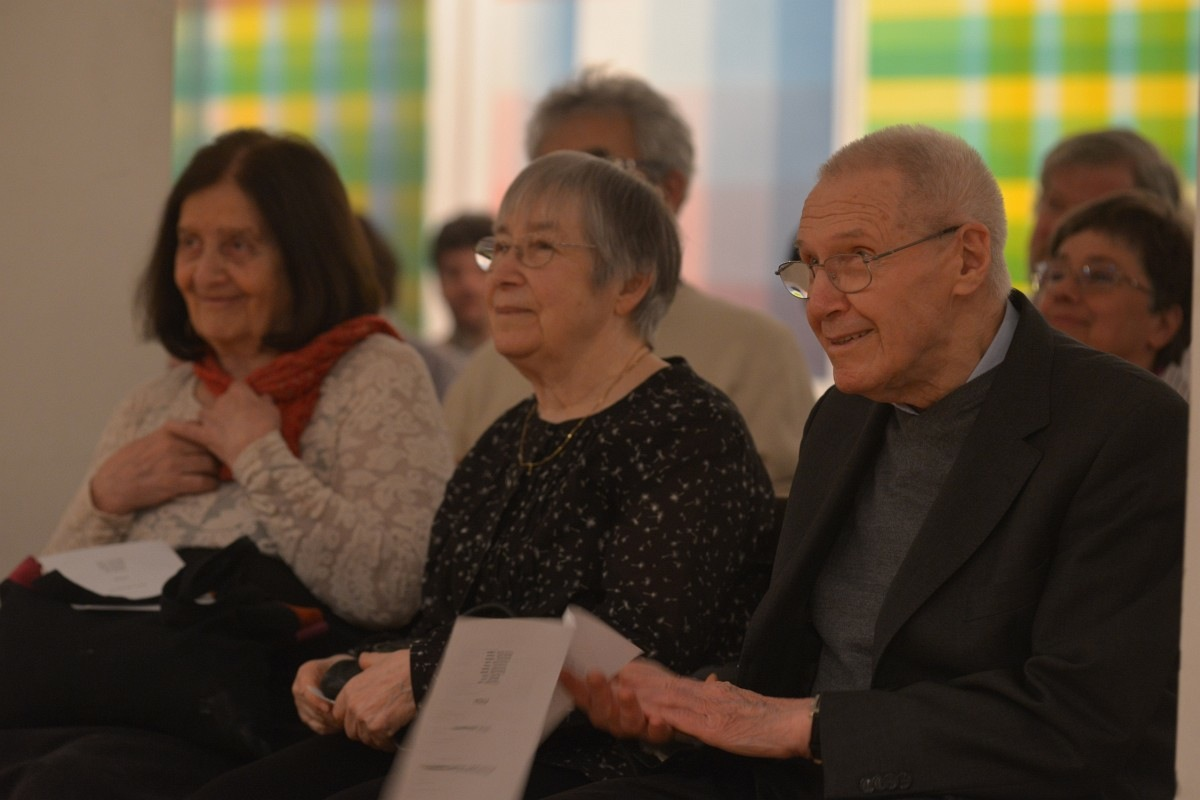
Left to right: Sári Gerlóczy, Márta Kurtág, and György Kurtág in 2014

Márta Kurtág was described as "of decisive significance in every field" of her husband's life, as a pianist with whom he performed and "as the first listener and critic of his compositions in gestation". They performed together for 60 years, in concert, for radio, and in recordings. They often played from his Játékok (Games), a collection of miniature pieces for two and four hands, including transcriptions of works by Johann Sebastian Bach. Later volumes of Játékok are subtitled Diary Entries and Personal Messages. When her husband was the featured composer of the Rheingau Musik Festival in 2004, she played with him from Játékok in a concert. They gave concerts at the 2008 Aldeburgh Festival, with violinist Hiromi Kikuchi and pianist Pierre-Laurent Aimard at The Maltings. A review noted that

... their performance embodies a lot about the Kurtág ethos of simplicity and understatement. They sit before a humble upright piano, just as if they were at home, in private, playing for their own enjoyment. One key to appreciating Kurtág's miniatures is to understand how personal and intimate they are. ... Játékok means 'games'. Kurtág is playing with new ideas, letting the pieces fall together in different ways, like a child playing with building bricks.

They also played from the collection in the Zankel Hall at New York City's Carnegie Hall in 2009, in Paris at the Festival d'Automne and the Festival le Piano aux Jacobins, the Théâtre du Jeu de Paume in Aix-en-Provence, the Library of Congress in Washington, D.C., and the Tonhalle, Zürich, among others. When György Kurtág received the gold medal from the Royal Philharmonic Society in London in 2013, they played together at the Queen Elizabeth Hall in London. A reviewer from The Guardian observed:

Some of Kurtág's duets interlace the players' hands so that one person must stretch across the other in a game of musical Twister; in this familiar embrace, husband and wife played them with beautiful understatement. They included some of Kurtág's duet transcriptions of Bach which, often underpinned by bass lines chuntering quietly at the extreme bottom of the keyboard, sounded affectionate, quirky and wholly delightful.

Márta Kurtág died on 17 October 2019 in Budapest.

== Recordings ==
In 1997, Játékok / György Kurtág, Márta Kurtág was released by ECM Records, including Bach transcriptions such as the Sonatina from Bach's Gottes Zeit ist die allerbeste Zeit, BWV 106. In 1999, she recorded Beethoven's Diabelli Variations for BMC and later noted:

The story with the Diabelli Variations is also a little like the story of my life. In 1951 I began to study this work. I played the variations for the first time in 1952 for the concert concluding my degree in artistic studies. I was the first one to do it in Hungary after the war. I don't know why, but at that time it was not in the concert repertoire and there weren't even any recordings by major pianists. There was no model to follow and we had to fend for ourselves. I always say "we" when it comes to music because I married György Kurtág during our university years, in 1947, and we have worked together for all of our married life.

In 2015, the couple recorded Marta & Gyorgy Kurtág: In Memoriam Haydée, with pieces from Játékok and transcriptions, including again Bach's Sonatina from Actus Tragicus. A recording with pieces from Játékok and a Suite for Four Hands was issued in 2017, a collection of recordings made for Magyar Rádió between 1955 and 2001.
