= Endre Szervánszky =

Hungarian composer (1911–1977)

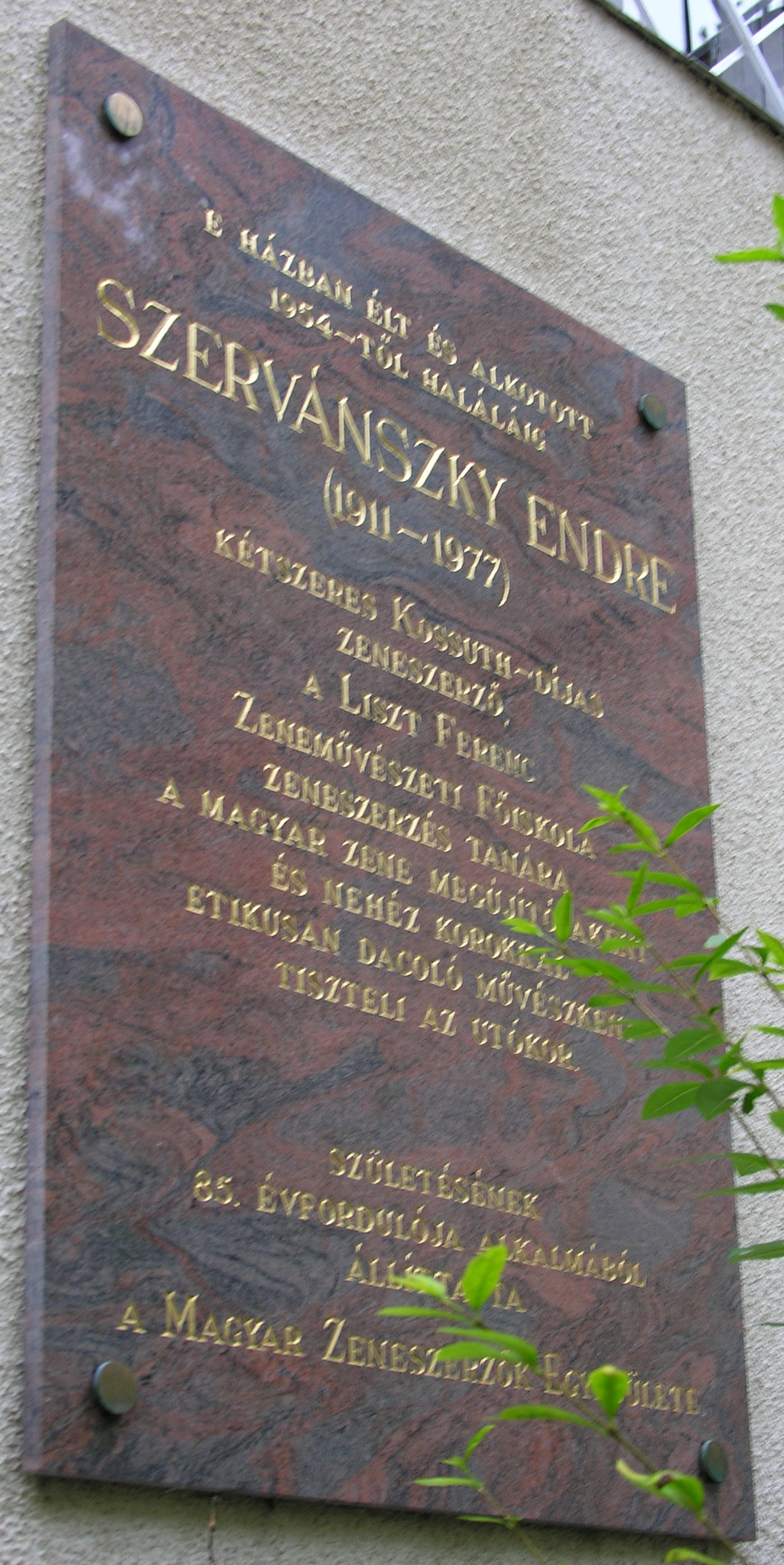
Plaque dedicated to Szervánszky in the 2nd district of Budapest, Hungary

Endre Szervánszky (27 December 1911 – 25 June 1977) was a Hungarian composer.

== Biography ==
Szervánszky was born in Kistétény and studied the clarinet at the Budapest Academy of Music (1922–27). He played in various orchestras before returning to the academy to study composition with Albert Siklós (1931–36). He then worked as an orchestrator for the Hungarian Radio and taught musical theory. He was appointed professor of composition at the Budapest Academy in 1948.

Szervánszky first came to public attention with his First String Quartet (1936–38) and his works of this period were influenced by his compatriots, Zoltán Kodály and Béla Bartók. Works for this time include the Clarinet Serenade (1950) and the Flute Concerto (1952–53).

From the early 1950s Szervánszky embarked on a series of larger compositions, one of the longest being the Concerto for Orchestra in memory of Attila József. Each of the concerto's five movements is based on a quotation from József. The fourth has folk music elements and the whole demonstrates the influence of Bartók. Both the String Quartet no.2 (1956–57) and the Wind Quintet no.2 (1957) also demonstrate the composer's increasing interest in serialism.

For his Six Orchestra Pieces, composed in 1959, Szervánszky employed 12-note serialism and the piece is particular in its use of percussion. Szervánszky did not compose another major work until 1963 – the oratorio Requiem – Dark Heaven, based on a text by János Pilinszky which takes the concentration camp of Auschwitz as its theme. Works which followed include the Variations for Orchestra (1964) and the Clarinet Concerto (1965).

Endre Szervánszky was given the "Righteous Among the Nations" award by the State of Israel to honour non-Jews who risked their lives to save Jews from the Nazis.

== Family ==
He was the brother of artist Jenö Szervánszky and violinist Peter Szervánszky (who gave the Hungarian premiere of Bartók's Second Violin Concerto) and the uncle of pianist Valeria Szervánszky.

He died in Budapest.

== Notable students ==
- Ákos Rózmann

== Works ==
=== Stage and vocal works ===
- Napkeleti mese – “Oriental Tale”, (a "dance play") 1948–9
- Népdalszvit – “Folksong Suite”, 1949
- Honvédkantáta – “Soldier’s Cantata”, 1949
- Tavaszi Szél – “Spring Breeze” (cantata), 1950
- 8 Petőfi Songs, 1951
- 3 Petőfi Choruses, 1953
- 3 Songs, 1956–7
- 3 Male Choruses (ancient China), 1958
- Requiem – “Dark Heaven” to words by János Pilinszky (oratorio), 1963
- Az éj – “The Night” (cantata), 1974–5

=== Orchestra ===
- 3 divertimentos, 1939, 1942, 1943
- Serenade, strings, 1947–8
- Rhapsody, 1950
- Serenade for clarinet and orchestra, 1950
- Flute Concerts, 1952–3
- Concerts for Orchestra, 1954
- 6 Orchestral Pieces, 1959
- Variations, 1964
- Clarinet Concerto, 1965

=== Chamber ===
- String Quartet no.1, 1936–8
- 20 Little Duos for 2 violins, 1941
- Sonata for violin and piano, 1945
- 25 Duos for 2 violins, 1946
- Trio for flute, violin and viola, 1951
- Sonatina for flute, and piano, 1952
- Wind Quintet no.1, 1953
- 5 Koncert etűd – “5 Concert Etudes” for flute, 1956
- Suite for 2 flutes, 1956
- String Quartet No.2, 1956–7
- Wind Quintet no.2, 1957
- 2 Duos for 2 flutes, 1972
- 7 Studies for flute, 1974–5

=== Piano ===
- Folksong Suite, 4 hands, 1935
- Little Suite, 1939
- Sonatina, 1941
- Sonatina, 4 hands, 1950

=== Films ===
- For Whom the Larks Sing, 1959
- Be True Until Death, 1960
