= György Kurtág =

Hungarian composer and pianist (born 1926)

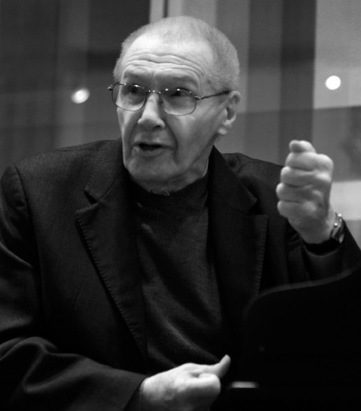
- Kurtág in 2014
- Born: 19 February 1926 (age 100); Lugoj, Romania
- Occupations: Composer; pianist
- Works: List of compositions
- Spouse: Márta Kurtág (m. 1947; died 2019)
- Awards: Kossuth Prize; Ernst von Siemens Music Prize; Pour le Mérite; Sonning Award; Golden Lion; Royal Philharmonic Society's Gold Medal

György Kurtág (Hungarian: [ˈɟørɟ ˈkurtaːɡ]; born 19 February 1926) is a Hungarian composer of contemporary classical music and pianist. According to Grove Music Online, his style draws on "Bartók, Webern and, to a lesser extent, Stravinsky", and "his work is characterized by compression in scale and forces, and by a particular immediacy of expression". In 2023 he was described as "one of the last living links to the defining postwar composers of the European avant-garde".

Kurtág was an academic teacher of piano at the Franz Liszt Academy of Music from 1967, later also of chamber music, and taught until 1993. For decades, Kurtág and his wife Márta gave recitals on one piano of selections from his ten-volume collection Játékok and his Bach transcriptions.

== Life and career ==
György Kurtág was born on 19 February 1926 in Lugoj, Romania, to Jewish Hungarian parents. He spoke Hungarian, Romanian, and German early. From the age of 14, he took piano lessons from Magda Kardos and studied composition with Max Eisikovits in Timișoara. He moved to Budapest in 1946 and became a Hungarian citizen in 1948. There, he began his studies at the Franz Liszt Academy of Music, where he met his wife, Márta Kinsker, as well as composer György Ligeti, who became a close friend. His piano teacher at the academy was Pál Kadosa. He studied composition with Sándor Veress and Ferenc Farkas, chamber music with Leó Weiner, and theory with Lajos Bárdos, and graduated in piano and chamber music in 1951. He married Márta in 1947 and their son György was born in 1954. He received his degree in composition in 1955, with a viola concerto that received the Erkel Prize.

Following the Hungarian uprising in 1956, Kurtág planned to emigrate, like Ligeti, but was hindered by circumstances. He was able to live in Paris between 1957 and 1958, a time of critical importance for him, studying with Max Deutsch, Olivier Messiaen, and Darius Milhaud, discovering the plays by Samuel Beckett and scores by Anton Webern. He suffered from severe depression, saying: "I realized to the point of despair that nothing I had believed to constitute the world was true", and that he "felt like a cockroach trying to become human". Kurtág received therapy from art psychologist Marianne Stein, who encouraged him to work from the simplest musical elements, extremely small tonal connections arranged in mosaic-like patterns, musical gestures like a breath or a sigh, using "economical, compressed, essential" cells. The encounter revivified him and stimulated his artistic development.

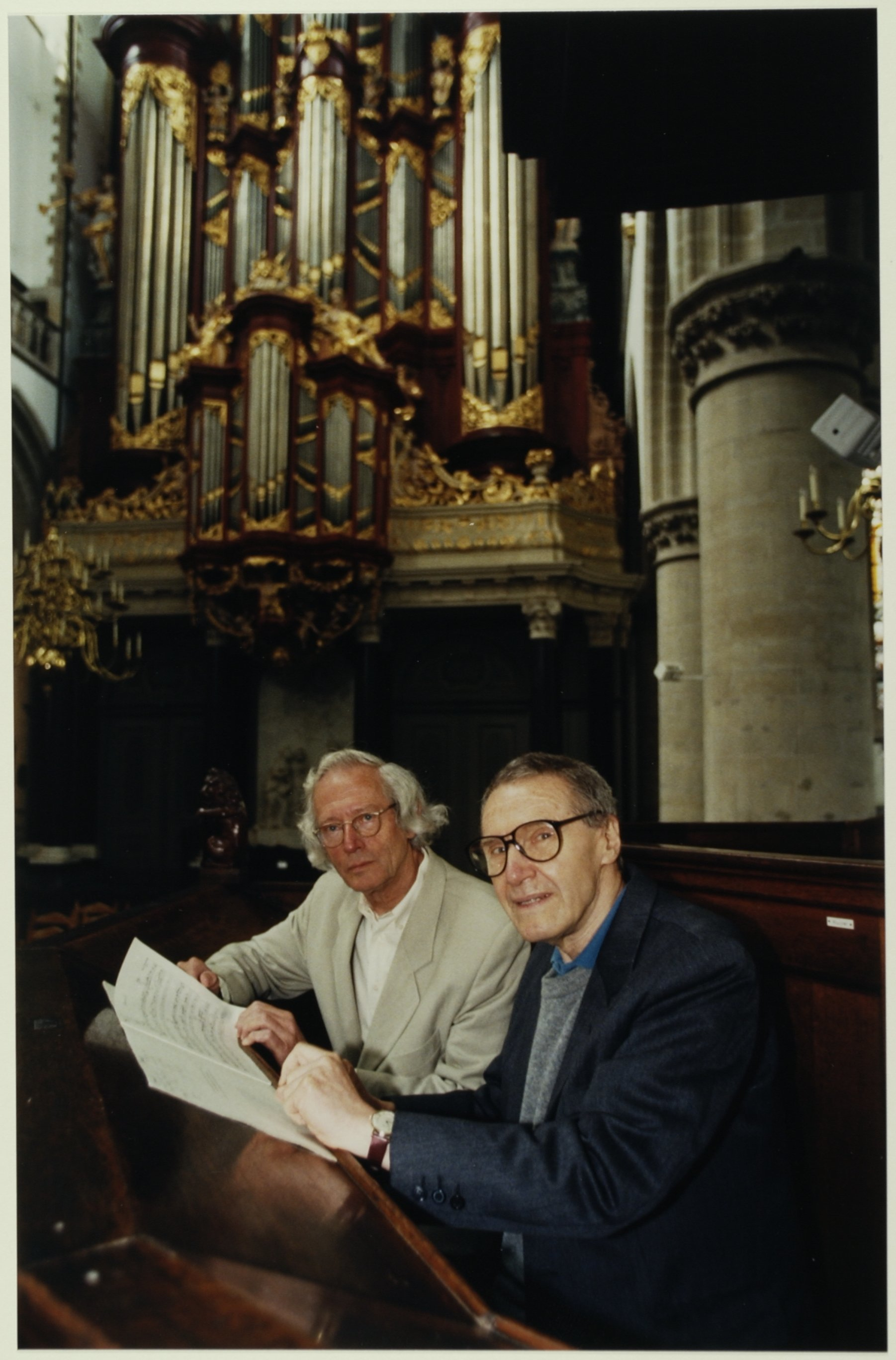
Kurtág and Piet Kee, 1997

Travelling home, Kurtág listened in Cologne to Ligeti's Artikulation and Stockhausen's Gruppen. The string quartet he composed in 1959 after his return to Budapest marks a crucial turning point; he calls it his Opus 1.

Kurtág worked as a répétiteur at the Bartók Music School (1958–63) and at the National Philharmonia in Budapest (1960–68). In 1967, he was appointed professor of piano and later also of chamber music at the Franz Liszt Academy, where he taught until 1993. During this time his students included Zoltán Kocsis and András Schiff.

Kurtág's first international opportunity for recognition was in 1968 when his largest work to date, The Sayings of Peter Bornemisza, was performed by Erika Sziklay and Lóránt Szűcs at the Darmstadt Summer Courses for New Music. The critical response was not positive, and it was overshadowed by Stockhausen's Musik für ein Haus. Kurtág's international recognition began to grow in 1981 with the premiere in Paris of Messages of the Late Miss R.V. Troussova for soprano and chamber ensemble.

Kurtág has written a few orchestral works, such as Stele for the Berlin Philharmonic and Messages, but his primary forms of expression are fragments, bagatelles, moments, games, and splinters. He composed an opera, Fin de partie to a libretto he derived from Beckett's Endgame, which premiered at La Scala in Milan on 15 November 2018, eight years after the original commission.

Kurtág has held master classes in chamber music. Since the early 1990s, he has worked abroad with increasing frequency: he was composer in residence at the Berlin Philharmonic (1993–95) and the Vienna Konzerthaus Society (1995). He then lived in the Netherlands (1996–98), again in Berlin (1998–99) and upon invitation by Ensemble intercontemporain, Cité de la Musique, and Festival d'Automne, in Paris (1999–2001).

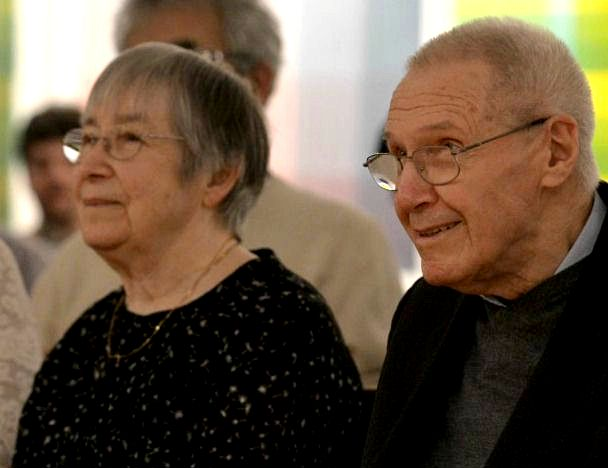
Márta and György Kurtág, 2014

Kurtág and his wife lived near Bordeaux from 2002 to 2015, when they moved back to Budapest. They performed together for 60 years, in concert, for radio, and in recordings. The couple played a selection of pieces for two- and four-hand piano from Kurtág's ten-volume collection Játékok and Bach transcriptions. They appeared in 2004 when Kurtág was the featured composer of the Rheingau Musik Festival. When he received the gold medal from the Royal Philharmonic Society in London in 2013, they played at the Queen Elizabeth Hall in London. A reviewer for The Guardian wrote:

Some of Kurtág's duets interlace the players' hands so that one person must stretch across the other in a game of musical Twister; in this familiar embrace, husband and wife played them with beautiful understatement. They included some of Kurtág's duet transcriptions of Bach which, often underpinned by bass lines chuntering quietly at the extreme bottom of the keyboard, sounded affectionate, quirky and wholly delightful.

Márta died in October 2019.

== Music ==
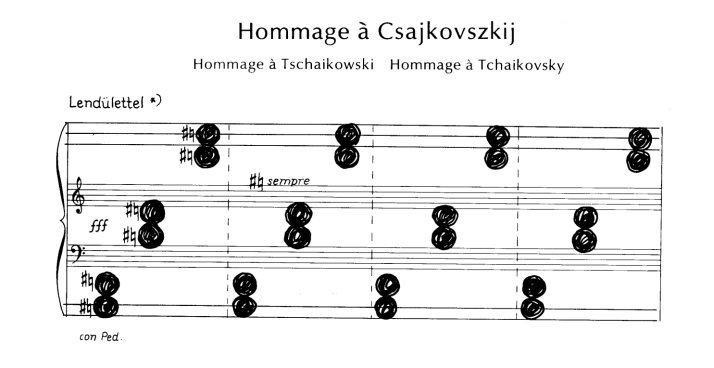
The beginning of the piece "Hommage à Tchaikovsky" from Játékok, parodying the opening of Tchaikovsky's First Piano Concerto. Kurtág uses special notation in some of the pieces. In the score above, the large black dots mean "play with both palms laid side by side".

According to scholar Rachel Beckles Willson, "Kurtág composes painstakingly and haltingly: in 1985, when he was 59, his output had reached only Op. 23, and several works remained unfinished or had been withdrawn for revision."

Kurtág's compositions are often made up of many very brief movements. Kafka Fragments, for instance, is an approximately 55-minute song cycle for soprano and solo violin made up of 40 short movements, setting extracts from Franz Kafka's writings, diaries, and letters. Music journalist Tom Service wrote that Kurtág's music "involved reducing music to the level of the fragment, the moment, with individual pieces or movements lasting mere seconds, or a minute, perhaps two." Most extreme of all, his piano piece "Flowers We Are, Mere Flowers", from the eighth volume of Játékok ("Games"), consists of just seven notes. Because of this interest in miniatures, Kurtág's music is often compared to Webern's.

Until Stele, Op. 33, written for the Berlin Philharmonic and Claudio Abbado, Kurtág's compositions were mainly vocal solo and choral music and instrumental music ranging from solo pieces to works for chamber ensembles of increasing size. Since Stele, a number of large-scale compositions have premiered, such as Messages, Op. 34, New Messages, Op. 34a, and the double concerto …concertante…, Op. 42.

Beginning in the late 1980s, Kurtág wrote several works in which the spatial distribution of instruments plays an important role. His … quasi una fantasia… for piano and ensemble (1988) is the first piece in which he explores the idea of music that spatially embraces the audience.

Kurtág's music has been called a dialogue with poets such as Beckett, Kafka, and Anna Akhmatova and composers such as Bach, Beethoven, and Berg, to whom he has alluded and for whom he wrote homages in appreciation of their art and worldviews.

Most of Kurtág's music is published by Editio Musica Budapest, some by Universal Edition, Vienna, and some by Boosey & Hawkes, London.

== Recognition ==
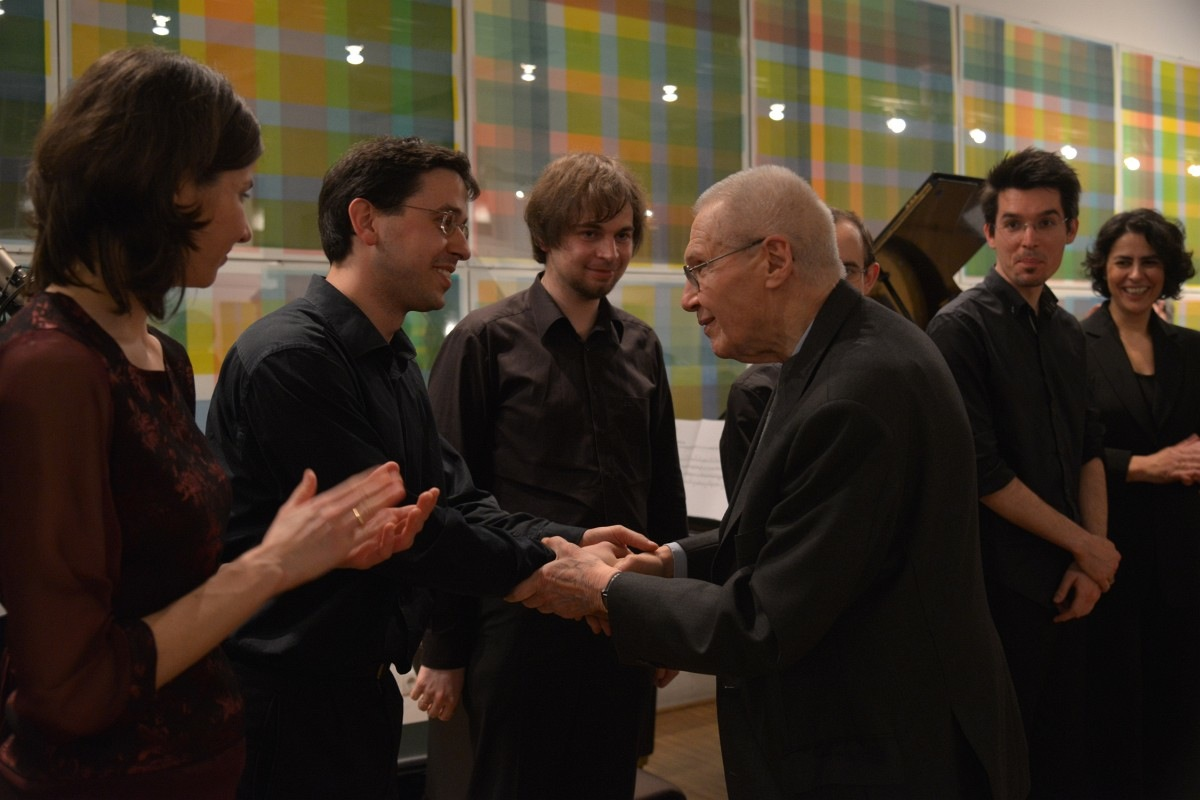
Kurtág with students, 2014

Kurtág has received numerous awards, including Officier of the Ordre des Arts et des Lettres in 1985, the Kossuth Award of the Hungarian government for his life achievement in 1973, the Austrian Ehrenzeichen in 1996, and the Ernst von Siemens Music Prize in 1998. He is also a member of the Bavarian Academy of Fine Arts, Munich, and of the Akademie der Künste, Berlin (both since 1987), and was named an Honorary Member of the American Academy of Arts and Letters in 2001. In 2006, he received the Grawemeyer Award for his composition …concertante…, Op. 42, for violin, viola and orchestra.

In 2024 Kurtág received the Wolf Prize, an international award granted in Israel, "for his contribution to the world's cultural heritage, which is fundamentally inspirational and human".

Kurtág received the 2014 BBVA Foundation Frontiers of Knowledge Award in the category of Contemporary Music for, in the view of the jury, its "rare expressive intensity". "The novel dimension of his music", the citation continues, "lies not in the material he uses but in its spirit, the authenticity of its language, and the way it crosses borders between spontaneity and reflection, between formalism and expression."

The Ensemble Modern and soloists performed his works Opp. 19, 31b and 17. On the occasion of his 80th birthday in February 2006, the Budapest Music Centre honoured him with a festival in his hometown.

On 19 February 2026, Kurtág turned 100. A festival of his music was held in Budapest, including the world premiere of his second opera, Die Stechardin, dedicated to his wife, in his presence.

== Awards ==
- Erkel Prize in 1954, 1956 and 1969
- Kossuth Prize in 1973 and 1996
- UNESCO's International Rostrum of Composers (1983)
- Music Prize of the Prince Pierre of Monaco Foundation (1993)
- International Antonio Feltrinelli Prize (1993)
- Composers Award of the State of Austria (1994)
- Denis de Rougemot Prize of the European Festivals Association (1994)
- Kossuth Prize for Lifetime Achievement (1996)
- Austrian Decoration for Science and Art (1997)
- Ernst von Siemens Music Prize (1998)
- Honorary Prize for Art and Science of the Institute for Advanced Study Berlin (1999)
- Pour le Mérite for Science and Art (1999)
- Foundation for Contemporary Arts Grants to Artists Award (2000)
- John Cage Award (2003)
- Sonning Award (2003; Denmark)
- Grand Cross of Merit of the Republic of Hungary (2006)
- University of Louisville Grawemeyer Award for Music Composition (2006; U.S.)
- Honorary member of the Union of Composers and Musicologists from Romania (2008)
- Golden Lion of the Venice Biennale for lifetime achievement (53rd International Festival of Contemporary Music; 2009)
- Zürich Festival Prize (2010)
- Royal Philharmonic Society Gold Medal (2013)
- BBVA Foundation Frontiers of Knowledge Award in Contemporary Music (2014)
- Fellow of the American Academy of Arts and Sciences (2015)
- Rolf Schock Prize (2020)
- The Wolf Prize (2024)

=== Honorary doctorates ===
- Franz Liszt Academy of Music (2026)
