= List of minimalist composers =

The following is a list of minimalist composers:

== By country ==
=== Australia ===
- Anne Boyd
- Andrew Chubb
- Robert Davidson
- Matthew Hindson
- Phillip Houghton
- Kate Moore
- Nigel Westlake

=== Belgium ===
- Frans Geysen
- Karel Goeyvaerts
- Wim Mertens

=== Canada ===
- Kyle Bobby Dunn (based in the United States)
- Peter Hannan
- Ann Southam

=== Denmark ===
- Hans Abrahamsen

=== Estonia ===
- Arvo Pärt

=== Finland ===
- Petri Kuljuntausta
- Erkki Salmenhaara

=== France ===
- Éliane Radigue
- Renaud Gagneux
- Yann Tiersen
- Pascal Comelade

=== Georgia ===
- Giya Kancheli (based in Belgium)

=== Germany ===
- Peter Michael Hamel
- Hauke Harder
- Hans Otte
- Ernstalbrecht Stiebler
- Wolfgang Voigt
- Walter Zimmermann

=== Hungary ===
- Zoltán Jeney
- László Melis
- László Sáry
- Tibor Szemző
- László Vidovszky

=== Italy ===
- Roberto Carnevale
- Luciano Cilio
- Ludovico Einaudi
- Lucio Garau
- Giovanni Sollima
- Ezio Bosso

=== Japan ===
- Joe Hisaishi
- Jo Kondo
- Yoshi Wada (based in the United States)
- Yasunori Mitsuda

=== Latvia ===
- Pēteris Vasks

=== Netherlands ===
- Louis Andriessen
- Douwe Eisenga
- Simeon ten Holt

=== Poland ===
- Henryk Górecki
- Zygmunt Krauze
- Hania Rani
- Tomasz Sikorski

=== Russia ===
- Vladimir Martynov
- Anton Batagov
- Alexandre Rabinovitch-Barakovsky
- Kirill Richter

=== Serbia ===
- Vladimir Tošić

=== South Africa ===
- Kevin Volans

=== South Korea ===
- Jung Hee Choi

=== Spain ===
- Juan Hidalgo Codorniu
- Carles Santos
- Eduardo Polonio
- Llorenç Barber
- Pep Llopis
- Joan Valent

=== Sweden ===
- Catherine Christer Hennix (based in the United States)

=== Switzerland ===
- Ralph Zurmühle
- Walter Fähndrich
- Nik Bärtsch

=== Ukraine ===
- Lubomyr Melnyk

=== United Kingdom ===
- Gavin Bryars
- Joe Cutler
- Brian Eno
- Roger Eno
- Graham Fitkin
- Malcolm Galloway
- John Godfrey (composer)
- Orlando Gough
- Rob Haigh
- Christopher Hobbs
- Michael Parsons
- Max Richter
- Howard Skempton
- Dave Smith
- Steve Martland
- Anna Meredith
- Michael Nyman
- Mike Oldfield
- Andrew Poppy
- Simon Rackham
- John Tavener

=== United States ===
- La Monte Young
- Tony Conrad
- Terry Riley
- Steve Reich
- Philip Glass
- Charlemagne Palestine
- Phill Niblock
- Pauline Oliveros
- Terry Jennings
- Dennis Johnson
- John Adams
- Julius Eastman
- Henry Flynt
- James Tenney
- John Luther Adams
- Laurie Anderson
- William Basinski
- Barbara Benary
- David Borden (and his ensemble Mother Mallard's Portable Masterpiece Company)
- Glenn Branca
- Harold Budd
- Alvin Lucier
- David Behrman
- Joseph Byrd
- Lawrence Chandler
- Richard Chartier
- Rhys Chatham (based in France)
- Anna Clyne
- Philip Corner (based in Italy)
- Kurt Doles
- Arnold Dreyblatt (based in Germany)
- Jon Gibson
- Daniel Goode
- Annie Gosfield
- Michael Harrison
- Rafael Anton Irisarri
- Scott Johnson
- Tom Johnson (based in France)
- Sarah Kirkland Snider
- Catherine Lamb
- Hannah Lash
- Douglas Leedy
- Angus MacLise (died in Nepal)
- Kali Malone
- Ingram Marshall
- Richard Maxfield
- Meredith Monk
- Robert Moran
- Tim Risher
- Arthur Russell
- Andrew Shapiro
- Caroline Shaw
- Wayne Siegel (based in Denmark)
- Stars of the Lid (Adam Wiltzie & Brian McBride)
- Michael Torke
- David Toub
- Lois V. Vierk
- Michael Waller
- Shelley Washington
- John White (born in the UK)
- Julia Wolfe

== By movement ==
=== Mystic minimalists ===
A number of composers showing a distinctly religious influence have been labelled the "mystic minimalists", or "holy minimalists":

- Henryk Górecki
- Alan Hovhaness (the earliest mystic minimalist)
- Giya Kancheli
- Kali Malone
- Hans Otte
- Arvo Pärt
- John Tavener
- Pēteris Vasks

=== Precedent composers ===
Other composers whose works have been described as precedents to minimalism include:

- Jakob van Domselaer, whose early-20th century experiments in translating the theories of Piet Mondrian's De Stijl movement into music represent an early precedent to minimalist music.
- Alexander Mosolov, whose orchestral composition Iron Foundry (1923) is made up of mechanical and repetitive patterns.
- George Antheil, whose 1924 Ballet Mecanique is characterized by much use of motoric and repetitive patterns, as well as an instrumentation made up of multiple player pianos and mallet percussion.
- Erik Satie, seen as a precursor of minimalism in much of his music. For example, his score for Francis Picabia's 1924 film Entr'acte consists of phrases, many borrowed from bawdy popular songs, ordered seemingly arbitrarily and repetitiously, providing a rhythmic counterpoint to the film.
- Alan Hovhaness
- John Cage
- Colin McPhee, whose Tabuh-Tabuhan for two pianos and orchestra (1936) features the use of motoric, repetitive, pentatonic patterns drawn from the music of Bali (and featuring a large section of tuned percussion).
- Carl Orff, who, particularly in his later theater works Antigonae (1940–1949) and Oedipus der Tyrann (1957–58), utilized instrumentations (six pianos and multiple xylophones, in imitation of gamelan music) and musical patterns (motoric, repetitive, triadic) similar to the later music of Steve Reich and Philip Glass
- Yves Klein, whose Monotone Symphony (formally The Monotone-Silence Symphony, premiered in 1960, synonym conceived in 1947–1948) is an orchestral 40-minute piece whose first movement is an unvarying 20-minute drone and the second and last movement a 20-minute silence, predating by several years both the drone music works of La Monte Young and the "silent" 4'33" of John Cage.
- Morton Feldman, whose works prominently feature some sort of repetition as well as a sparseness.
- Anton Webern, whose economy of materials and sparse textures led many of the minimalists who were educated in serialism to turn to a reduction of means.
- Alphonse Allais is the author of the earliest known example of a completely silent musical composition. His Funeral March for the Obsequies of a Great Deaf Man of 1897 consists of twenty-four blank measures. The fact that this is his one and only composition makes him all the more a precursor of minimalism in music.
