= Tibor Szemző =

Hungarian composer and performer

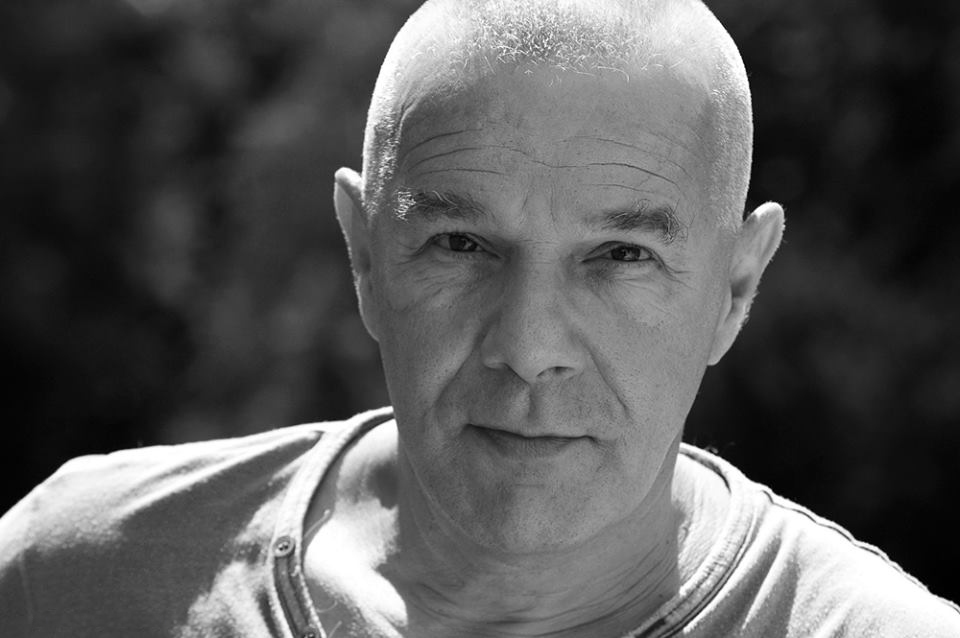
Tibor Szemző

Tibor Szemző (born 1955, Budapest, Hungary) is a Hungarian composer, performer, media artist. His pieces often include spoken texts, film and other media. He creates installations and composes music for his own and others’ films. Ever since the beginning of his career, he has been performing actively and widely in Hungary and abroad as well.

== Biography ==
Szemző was born in Budapest, into a middle-class family, declassed as a result of World War II and socialism. His family originates from former Upper Hungary. His musical training was conducted in accordance with the Kodály method. He attended an elementary school that specialised in music. Originally he studied fine mechanics at high school that he abandoned at the age of 17 to dedicate all of his time to instrumental studies. He completed the Béla Bartók Conservatory in two years and later studied at the Liszt Ferenc Academy of Music (1976–79). He earned a Media Design degree at the Moholy-Nagy University of Art and Design (2014) and pursued a DLA from the Hungarian Academy of Fine Arts (2017).

In 1973, he founded the Szemző Quartet (originally a trio) playing improvised chamber music, which later merged into Group 180.

Group 180 was founded in 1979 and was active until 1989. It was started by Szemző and his fellow students, friends (László Melis, András Soós, László Gőz). Group 180 played a prominent role in the distribution of international contemporary repetitive music in Hungary and disseminated Hungarian contemporary music abroad. The group achieved a remarkable domestic and international career. (During the ten years of its existence, the Group worked with such major figures of the genre as Frederic Rzewski, Steve Reich, Terry Riley, Alvin Curran, Phill Niblock, Arnold Dreyblatt, Peter Kotik or László Vidovszky.)

In addition, Szemző began his solo career in 1983. Besides his pieces composed for Group 180 in this period, he created Water Wonder, a piece involving live electronics.

From 1987 to 2003, London-based Leo Records released his recordings, occasionally in co-operation with Hungary-based Bahia Records. His first solo release was Snapshot from the Island in 1987.

His interest in cinematography was inspired by his ever-lasting collaboration with media artist Péter Forgács (Group 180's former narrator) and started with the compositions written for Forgács's films. Szemző began to create individual, music-based films in 1985, which is constantly present in his activity.

In 1986/87 he founded Fodderbasis, an open music ensemble. The group's projects were partly multimedia events. They produced some publications, in connection with Forgács's films.

In 1996, Szemző launched the Gordian Knot Creative Music Laboratory, which operated until 2007.

His highly successful and award-winning film was made about the life of Sándor Kőrösi Csoma, pilgrim, linguist and tibetologist. The film, titled A Guest of Life – Alexander Csoma de Kőrös (1999-2006) is an intermix animation film and 8mm footage. Both the movie and its stage version are starred by actresses Susannah York and Mari Törőcsik. The direct antecedents of the film were the Invisible Story (1996-2000) based on Béla Hamvas’ prose and The Other Shore (Japan, 1996). Other prominent pieces in Szemző's oeuvre are Tractatus based on Ludwig Wittgenstein’s Tractatus Logico-Philosophicus (1991-1995), the film Free Fall (1996), the Free Fall Oratorio (CD, 1999), and »K«Engravings, a multimedia-series on Franz Kafka, covering the ten-year cycle between 2008 and 2018.

His regular co-operating partners include the Agon Orchestra from Prague, the Moyzes Quartet from Bratislava, Jenő Oláh's and János Sándor's Folk Ensemble, the Amadinda Percussion Group, the Moving House Company, the Moments Notice Trio, the Danubius Quartet, the Polish Teatr Ósmego Dnia association, the Opus Posth from Moscow and the Polish Camerata Vistula chamber music ensemble.

Since the early 80s, according to the typical art practice of the era, Szemző's musical activity has been open to other arts (especially literature and fine arts, besides cinematography and theatre), often experimented with the boundaries of different art forms. He has taken part in or created numerous performances. He also creates installations. He regularly worked together with the members of the Vajda Lajos Studio of Szentendre, and with János Szirtes, with whom he was also a member of the New Modern Acrobatics performance group (1987-1991). Szemző often worked with fine and oboe artist Gábor Roskó, as well as with fine artist Tamás Waliczky in the early 90s. In his creations, verbality, speech sound, multilingualism, and motion picture play an essential role in a close unity.

== Music Compositions, Multimedia Pieces ==
- Kafka Islands 2025 – sound and film installation, Sound Dome, House of Music Hungary
- 2nd Sketch – Seems Like Kailash 2002/2024 for low flutes with electronics & big band with film
- Memory Shards – The Story of a True Love on The Island of Ada Kaleh in the Cigarette Factory During the Slow Flooding 2024 – cinematographic concerto for musicians, films and TJ
- Csoma Kaleidoscope 2023 – sound and film installation, Sound Dome, House of Music Hungary
- Two Morsels 2022 – for harp and saxophone - at the request of Duo Sera
- Memory Shards – Hommage á W.G. Sebald, In Memoriam MPÖ 2021 Two compositions for human voice, contra-alto flute and percussions with additional sounds
- Silverbird and the Cyclist – Alexander Csoma Arboretum 2020 cinematographic concert with narrator, vocal and instrumental soloist
- FLOW 2019 –
- »K«Engravings 2008-2018 Nineteen Multimedia Composition for human voices, various instruments, and films (text by Franz Kafka)
- Earth Time 2017 installation for film and video projectors, human voices, and music (text by Danilo Kiš)
- Early Sorrows 2015 piece for radio, text by Danilo Kiš, script: Gábor Németh, requested by the Hungarian Radio
- Hourglass 2014 text by Danilo Kiš, for instruments and human voices
- Stonewall Cake 2013 cinematic music performance
- The Message – dr Kafka's Last Love 2013 cinematic theater performance script: András Forgách, requested by the Palace of Arts Budapest
- An Imperial Message – 2010/11 piece for radio, text by Franz Kafka, script: András Forgách, requested by the Hungarian Radio
- CSOMA – a cinematic opera 2008 for human voices, storyteller and chamber orchestra, with film screening, text by László Sári, requested by ERA New Horizons (Wroclaw, Poland) and Palace of Arts Budapest
- Hamlet 2007 chamber opera for three voice and small ensemble (text: W. Shakespeare) requested by National Theater, Szeged, Hungary
- What Do You See? 2005 for chamber ensemble and the voice of Géza Ottlik, requested by the Hungarian Radio
- Csoma-Legendry (script by László Sári) 2004 for chamber ensemble and human voices (requested by the Hungarian Radio)
- Danube Exodus: The Rippling Currents Of The River 2002 with Péter Forgács, Getty Museum, Los Angeles
- Arboretuum 2002 for chamber ensemble and voices (requested by Off Dance Company)
- South Of No North – The Children of the Kosovo War 2001, ten movements for various instruments and human voices
- The Invisible Story 1996-2000 7 sketches for the text of Béla Hamvas 1996-2000 for mixed ensemble and human voice
- The Other Shore 1997 multimedia performance for narrators, chamber ensemble and films (shooting of The Other Shore)
- Free Fall with Péter Forgács 1996 video-oratorio
- Way Through? 1996 for 8mm phone, voice and bass flute, with moving pictures
- Symultan 1995-96 for human voices and various sounds
- Tractatus 1991-95 for human voice, musicians and narrators
- 33 Movements For String Quartet And Other Instruments 1994 for string quartet and various instruments
- Snap Two 1993 for bass flute, voice and electronics
- Gull 1992 choral variation for string quartet and tabla
- Quintet 1992 for table acrobat and string quartet
- Wittgenstein Tractatus 1991-92 with Péter Forgács 7 video movements
- Doppelkonzert 1989-91 installation-concerto for two performers, computer-driven synthesizers and radios requested by Soros Center/Budapest, Museum Moderner Kunst/Vienna
- Skullbase Fracture No.2. 1989 music / installation for 5 performers, Gypsy band, narrator and TV, cameraman and video (requested by Ars Electronica Festival ’89)
- Private Exits 1988-89 soundscapes for six performers and home movies, premiered at the Wiener Festwochen ’89 / Töne und Gegentöne, Vienna
- Private Hungary 1988 for 8mm phone, voice, flute and electronics, and home movies premiered at the Ars Electronica ’88 Festival (Linz Austria) with Péter Forgács
- Optimistic Lecture (In Memoriam Miklós Erdély) 1988 concertino for record-player and mixed ensemble
- Poisoned Idyll 1987 music installation for five Gypsy band
- Snapshot From The Island 1986 for bass flute and voice, tapes and electronics (with the home movies of Private Film Archive, Budapest)
- Watermusic 1985 installation for Gypsy band in small rowboats on the City Lake of Budapest
- Skullbase Fracture (text by P.Havliček) 1984 for narrator and TV, chamber ensemble and Gypsy band
- Traintrip 1983 for 21 instruments
- Water-Wonder 1982-83 for flutes and tape delay
- The Sex Appeal Of Death (In Memoriam T. Hajas) 1981 for chamber ensemble and child narrator

== Films ==
- 2nd Sketch – Seems Like Kailash 20’ (8mm / video) Fodderbasis 2002/2024
- The Story of a True Love on The Island of Ada Kaleh in the Cigarette Factory During the Slow Flooding 2024 – 50’ (8mm / video) Fodderbasis 2023
- Double Waves 15' (8mm / video) with János Sugár – Fodderbasis 2021
- Distance Predica 7 (8mm / video, BW) – Fodderbasis 2021
- Substance of a Dream 15' (8mm / video) – Fodderbasis 2021
- Swier Batfilm 9' (8mm / video, BW) – Fodderbasis 2017
- We'd Laugh Together, Fool Around And Go Swimming 25’ (8mm / video) Budapest Film 2014
- The Tip Of The Iceberg 17' (8mm / video) – Gordioso Film / Duna Műhely 2011
- The Sex Appeal Of Death 12' (video) – Gordioso Film / Duna Műhely 1990/2010
- Invisible Story 27' (8mm / video) – Gordioso Film / Duna Műhely 2009
- A Guest Of Life - Alexander Csoma de Körös 78' (8 / 35mm, color) – Mediawave 2000 Kft. 2006
- What There Is 11' (8mm / video, BW) – Kép-Árnyék 2005
- In Memoriam Nikolai Dimitriev 5' (8mm / video, BW) – Fodderbasis 2004
- Cseke-clip 9' (8mm / video, BW) – Fodderbasis 2003
- The Csoma Story – First Sketch 7' (8mm / video) – Gordioso Film 2001
- The Other Shore 20' (8 / 35mm, color) – BBS / Duna Műhely 1998
- CUBA 32' (8 / 16mm, BW) – Balázs Béla Stúdió 1993
- Skullbase Fracture 20'1985 20’ (video) – Balázs Béla Stúdió 1985

== Installations ==
- Kafka Islands 2025 – sound and film installation, Sound Dome, House of Music Hungary
- Csoma Kaleidoscope 2023 – film and sound installation, Sound Dome, House of Music Hungary
- Earth Time 2017 - National Museum, Oulu, Finland
- »K«engravings 2017 - Kassák Múzeum, Budapest
- K1 – Danilo Kiš Memorial Space 2014 multimedia installation, Moholy-Nagy University, Budapest
- Invisible Story 2008 film and sound installation for the request of WRO Art Center, Wroclaw, Poland
- Late Mutant Reels 2005 for the request of Ernst Museum, Budapest
- Loop 1998 film and sound installation for the St Pölten Sound Tower, for the request of Klangturm, St Pölten, Austria
- Another Shore – Engelspfad 1998 Sound installation for the Graben Plague Tower, Vienna, for the request of CBB / Easterfest '98, Vienna
- Transit 1993 installation for pocket radios (Kassel, Germany)
- Slow Light Seeking Darkness 2021 Corona Quartet, Klagenfurt A
- UH Fest, Turbina Budapest 2021 concert with Ábris Gryllus
- Accurate as the Atomic Clock 2019 New Modern Acrobatics, Miskolc
- The Hobby of The Woodcutter 2015 with József Tasnádi and Gábor Roskó, Budapest
- SZJ60 2014 with János Szirtes, László feLugossy, Beatrix Simkó, Zsolnay Quarter, Pécs, Hungary
- Barrels 2013 with András Böröcz at Vylyan Cellar, Villány, Hungary
- Stone-Bread 2009 with András Böröcz, Petőfi Literary Museum, Budapest
- Sunyi 1992 with Károly Minyó Szert at Ujlak / Budapest
- Trio 1992 with László feLugossy and János Szirtes at Helsinki / Finland
- Conversations / Interactive Sound And Picture 1991 with Tamás Waliczky at Étampes/France, Szkéné/Budapest (1992)
- Bones 1990 with János Szirtes and Péter Magyar at Hungarian Institut Sofia/Bulgaria
- Deathful Delay 1989 with Iván Angelus at Budapest, Salzburg, Berlin East/West
- Private Hungary 1988 with Péter Forgács at Ars Electronica ’88/Austria
- Comecon 1985 with Péter Forgács
- Iron Age 1985 with Péter Forgács at Ernst Museum
- Echo 1985 at Műcsarnok/Budapest, with Wolfgang Ernst and János Szirtes and 5 violin players
- Wonder Stag 1984 at Planum Festival, Budapest with János Szirtes and Jenő Menyhárt
- Free Style Swimming 1984 Kossuth Klub/Budapest with János Szirtes
- Plant 1983 with János Szirtes at Budapest and Breitenbrunn/Austria
- Avanti 1983 with János Szirtes
- Passing Sickness 1981 with János Szirtes at KEK/Budapest

== Music for Theatre ==
- Hamlet 2007 chamber opera for three voice and small ensemble requested by National Theater, Szeged, Hungary, directed by Péter Horváth)
- Arboretuum 2002 for chamber ensemble and voices (requested by Off Dance Company)
- Cekhov: The Gull 1992 theater piece (dir. István Bálint)
- Another Snap 1988 for dance performance (Elisa Monte Dance Company / NYC)
- Let's Go Out And Dance 1985 for shadowplay (Iván Angelus)
- Mirrors 1982 for dance theater (Iván Angelus)

== Discography ==
- Invisible Story Mini LP 2023 Fodderbasis FOB68
- SNAP #2 LP 2022 Fodderbasis FOB67
- ARBO X LP 2021 Fodderbasis FOB66
- Snapshot from the Island LP 2020 Fodderbasis FOB65
- CSOMA LP, 2019 Fodderbasis FB 063
- »K«engravings LP + films, 2018 Fodderbasis FB 062
- A Guest of Life-Alexander Csoma de Körös DVD 2008, Fantasy Film
- South Of No North CD 2003, Leo Records/Kbazovsky House CD LR 361
- The Danube Exodus CD 2002, Leo Records/Kbazovsky House CD LR 352
- Invisible Story CD 2001, Leo Records CD LR 311
- Sunset on Left CD 2000, Bahia Music CDB 071
- Another Shore CD (Angels as Pilots Anthology) 2000 Angel Lab, Austria
- Free Fall Oratorio CD 2000, author's edition, Fodderbasis FOB 021
- The Other Shore CD 1999, Leo Records, London/Bahia Music CD LR 281
- Snapshot from the Island CD 1999 Leo Records/Bahia Music CD LR 277
- Tractatus Lullaby 1999 Schrattenberg Anthology, Austria
- Water Wonder CD (Gergely Ittzés: Solos) 1999 Hungaroton HCD 31785
- Relative Things CD 1998, Leo Records, London CD LR 250
- Symultan CD 1997 (Hungarian Soundscapes) Hungarian Radio, HEAR 101
- Tractatus CD 1995, Leo Records, London CD LR 227
- The Sex Appeal Of Death/Airy Wedding CD 1994 (Musicworks Magazine insert) Toronto, Canada
- The Last Hungarian Vinyl SP 1994, Takarmánybázis (Fodderbasis)
- Duo with Martin Groeneweld CD 1984 (Growthrings Anthology) Hermit Foundation, Czech Republic
- The Conscience: Narrative Chamber Pieces CD 1993, 1999 Leo Records/BBS/Bahia Music, London/Budapest CD LR 185
- Ain't Nothing But A Little Bit Of Music For Moving Pictures CD 1992 TomK Records/BBS, Prague, Czechoslovakia
- Sub-Carpathia CD (Looking East/Electronic East) 1981 Erdenklang, West-Germany
- Meteo/The Dreams of Eckermann LP 1990 Hunnia (with János Másik)
- Private Exits LP 1989 HPS
- Snapshot from the Island LP 1987, CD 1999 Leo Records, London
- Water Wonder No.1. LP, CD (Group 180) 1983 Hungaroton, SLPX HCD 12545

== Actor ==
- Tiszta lap / Clean Slate – Lord's Voice (directed by László feLugossy, János Szirtes, 2002)
- Aranymadár / Golden Bird – Narrator (directed by István Szaladják, 1999)
- Önuralom /Self-Control (directed by László feLugossy,1988)

== Selected events ==
- Transparent Sound Festival 2024
- Csoma Kaleidoscope 2023
- O.Z.O.R.A - AMBYSS 2022
- Silverbird and the Cyclist 2022
- Opera Nova Festival, Prague 2019
- Budapest Music Center 2013-2019
- A38 Ship, Budapest 2003-2020
- Palace of Arts Budapest 2008-2019
- Buddhist International Film Festival 2009, Barbican Center, London
- Kolkata International Film Festival 2007, India
- Tribeca Film Festival, NYC 2007
- Getty Museum, Los Angeles, 2002
- Alternativa 2001, Moscow
- San Francisco Jewish Film Festival
- Angelica 2000, Bologna, Italia
- Prague New Music Marathon ’96,’98, 2000
- Unsung Music '96 and 2000, Queen Elizabeth Hall, London
- Warsaw Autumn Festival '95, Poland
- Music Now from Hungary '94, Yokohama, Japan
- Ars Electronica '88 and '89, Linz, Austria
- Wiener Festwochen '88
- New Music America '86, Houston
- Festival d'automne à Paris 1981
