= Hungarian pavilion =

Venice Biennale national pavilion

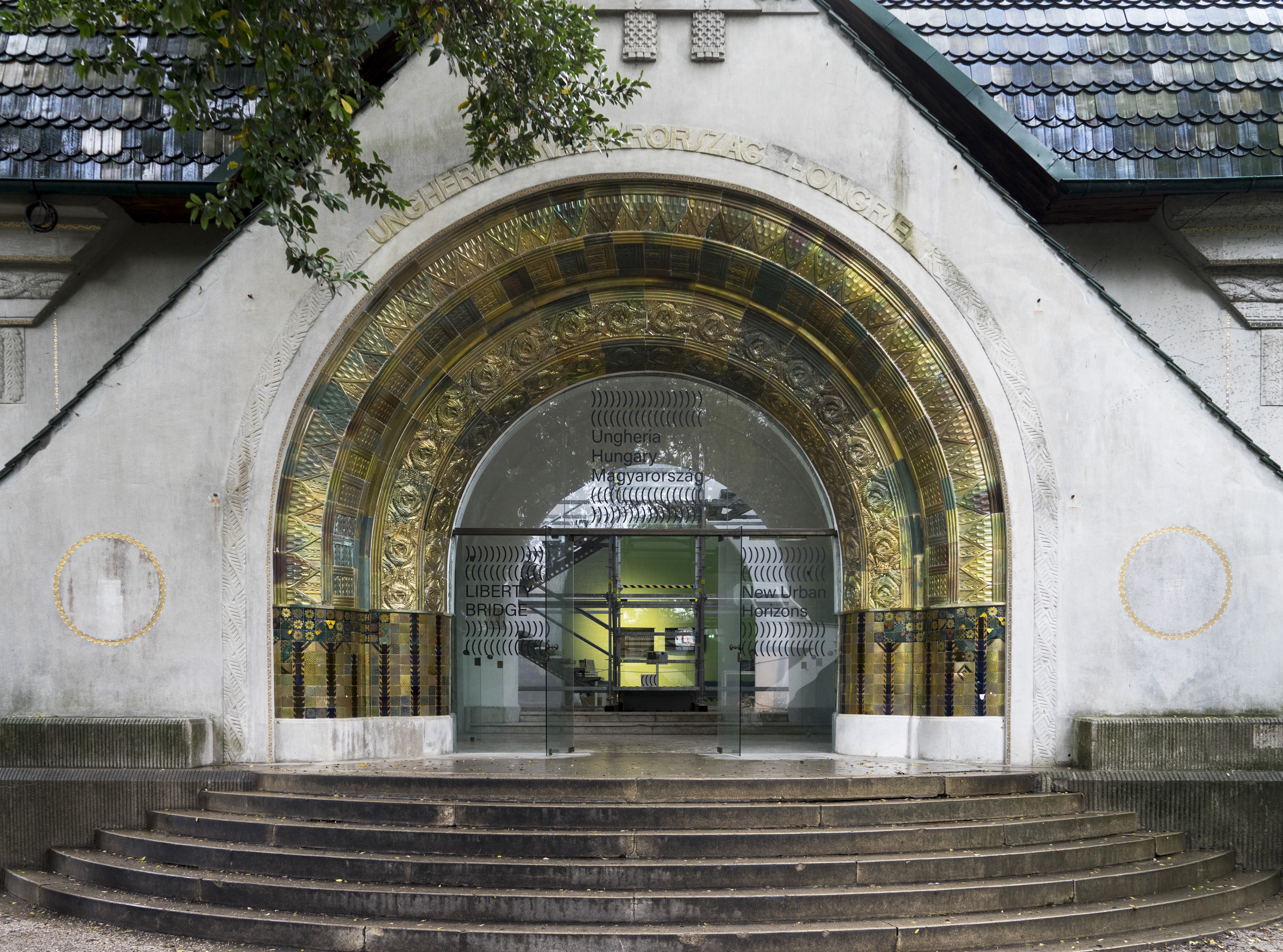
The Hungarian pavilion's entrance

The Hungarian pavilion houses Hungary's national representation during the Venice Biennale arts festivals.

== Background ==
The Venice Biennale is an international art biennial exhibition held in Venice, Italy. Often described as "the Olympics of the art world", participation in the Biennale is a prestigious event for contemporary artists. The festival has become a constellation of shows: a central exhibition curated by that year's artistic director, national pavilions hosted by individual nations, and independent exhibitions held throughout Venice. The Biennale's parent organisation also runs regular festivals in other arts: architecture, dance, film, music and theatre.

Outside the central international exhibition, individual nations produce their own shows, known as pavilions, as their national representation. Nations that own their pavilion buildings – such as the 30 housed in the Giardini – are responsible for their own upkeep and construction costs as well. Nations without dedicated buildings create pavilions in venues throughout the city.

== Organization and building ==
Hungary has been a participant of the Venice Biennial right from its beginnings in 1895. After the Italian and the Belgian, the Hungarian national pavilion was the third to be built at the Giardini. Designed by Géza Rintel Maróti, 1909 (restored by Ágost Benkhard, 1958, and György Csete 1998–2000). The Ludwig Museum – Museum of Contemporary Art took over the Venice selection process from 2015.

The Hungarian pavilion was designed in 1906 by artist-architect Géza Rintel Maróti and built through 1909. The building is influenced by Hungarian architecture and art traditions. It was twice restored: in 1958 by Ágost Benkhard, who added a courtyard and a flat roof, and in 1991–2000 by Gyorgy Csete. Only the entrance and some decoration are retained from Maróti's original building. The Ludwig Museum – Museum of Contemporary Art took over the Venice selection process from 2015.

== Representation by year ==
=== Art ===
- 1958 — Béla Czóbel, Gyula Derkovits, Noémi Ferenczy, Bertalan Pór, Margit Kovács, Ferenc Medgyessy and others (Commissioner: Lajos Vayer)
- 1960 — Gyula Derkovits, Lajos Szentiványi, Jenő Kerényi, Sándor Mikus (Commissioner: Lajos Vayer)
- 1962 — János Kmetty, Aurél Bernáth, István Gádor, Ferenc Martyn (Commissioner: Lajos Vayer)
- 1964 — Jenő Barcsay, Kálmán Csohány, György Segesdy (Commissioner: Lajos Vayer)
- 1966 — Miklós Borsos, Gyula Feledy (Commissioner: Lajos Vayer)
- 1968 — Ignác Kokas, Béla Kondor, Tibor Vilt (Commissioner: Lajos Vayer)
- 1970 — Gyula Hincz, József Somogyi (Commissioner: Lajos Vayer)
- 1972 — Endre Domanovszky, András Kiss Nagy (Commissioner: Lajos Vayer)
- 1980 — Jenő Barcsay, Endre Bálint, Dezső Korniss, Ferenc Martyn, Menyhért Tóth, Béla Kondor, Pál Deim, János Fajó, Árpád Szabados, Gábor Zrínyifalvi, Imre Bukta, László Fehér, Erzsébet Schaár, Tibor Vilt (Commissioner: Géza Csorba)
- 1982 — Erzsébet Schaár (Commissioner: Géza Csorba)
- 1984 — Imre Varga, György Vadász (Commissioner: Géza Csorba)
- 1986 — Imre Bak, Ákos Birkás, Károly Kelemen, István Nádler (Commissioner: Katalin Néray)
- 1988 — Imre Bukta, Sándor Pinczehelyi, Géza Samu (Commissioner: Katalin Néray)
- 1990 — László Fehér (Commissioner: Katalin Néray)
- 1993 — Joseph Kosuth, Viktor Lois (Commissioner: Katalin Keserü)
- 1995 — György Jovánovics (Commissioner: Márta Kovalovszky)
- 1997 — Róza El-Hassan, Judit Herskó, Éva Köves (Commissioner: Katalin Néray)
- 1999 — Imre Bukta, Emese Benczúr, Attila Csörgö, Gábor Erdélyi, Mariann Imre (Commissioner: János Sturcz)
- 2001 — Antal Lakner, Tamás Komoróczky (Commissioner: Julia Fabényi)
- 2003 — Little Warsaw (András Gálik, Bálint Havas) (Curator: Zsolt Petrányi, Commissioner: Julia Fabényi)
- 2005 — Balázs Kicsiny (Commissioner: Zsolt Petrányi, Curator: Péter Fitz)
- 2007 — Andreas Fogarasi (Commissioner: Zsolt Petrányi, Curator: Katalin Timár)
- 2009 — Péter Forgács (Commissioner: Zsolt Petrányi, Curator: András Rényi)
- 2011 — Hajnal Németh (Commissioner: Gábor Gulyás, Curator: Miklós Peternák)
- 2013 — Zsolt Asztalos (Commissioner: Gábor Gulyás, Curator: Gabriella Uhl)
- 2015 — Szilárd Cseke (Commissioner: Mónika Balatoni, Curator: Kinga German)
- 2017 — Gyula Várnai (Commissioner: Julia Fabényi, Curator: Zsolt Petrányi)
- 2019 — Tamás Waliczky (Commissioner: Julia Fabényi, Curator: Zsuzsanna Szegedy-Maszák)
- 2022 — Zsófia Keresztes (Commissioner: Julia Fabényi, Curator: Mónika Zsikla)
- 2026 — Endre Koronczi (Commissioner: Julia Fabényi, Curator: Luca Cserhalmi, Composer: Máté Balogh)

== Bibliography ==
- Russeth, Andrew (April 17, 2019). "The Venice Biennale: Everything You Could Ever Want to Know". ARTnews.
- Volpi, Cristiana (2013). "Hungary". In Re Rebaudengo, Adele (ed.). Pavilions and Garden of Venice Biennale. Rome: Contrasto. p. 168. ISBN 978-88-6965-440-4.
