= Klimo =

Klimo is a surname. Notable people with the surname include:

- György Klimó (1710–1777), bishop of Pécs, founder of press and public library
- Károly Klimó (born 1936), Hungarian artist

== Fictional characters ==
- "Klimo", a fictional eccentric detective in A Prince of Swindlers by Guy Boothby
