= Máté Balogh =

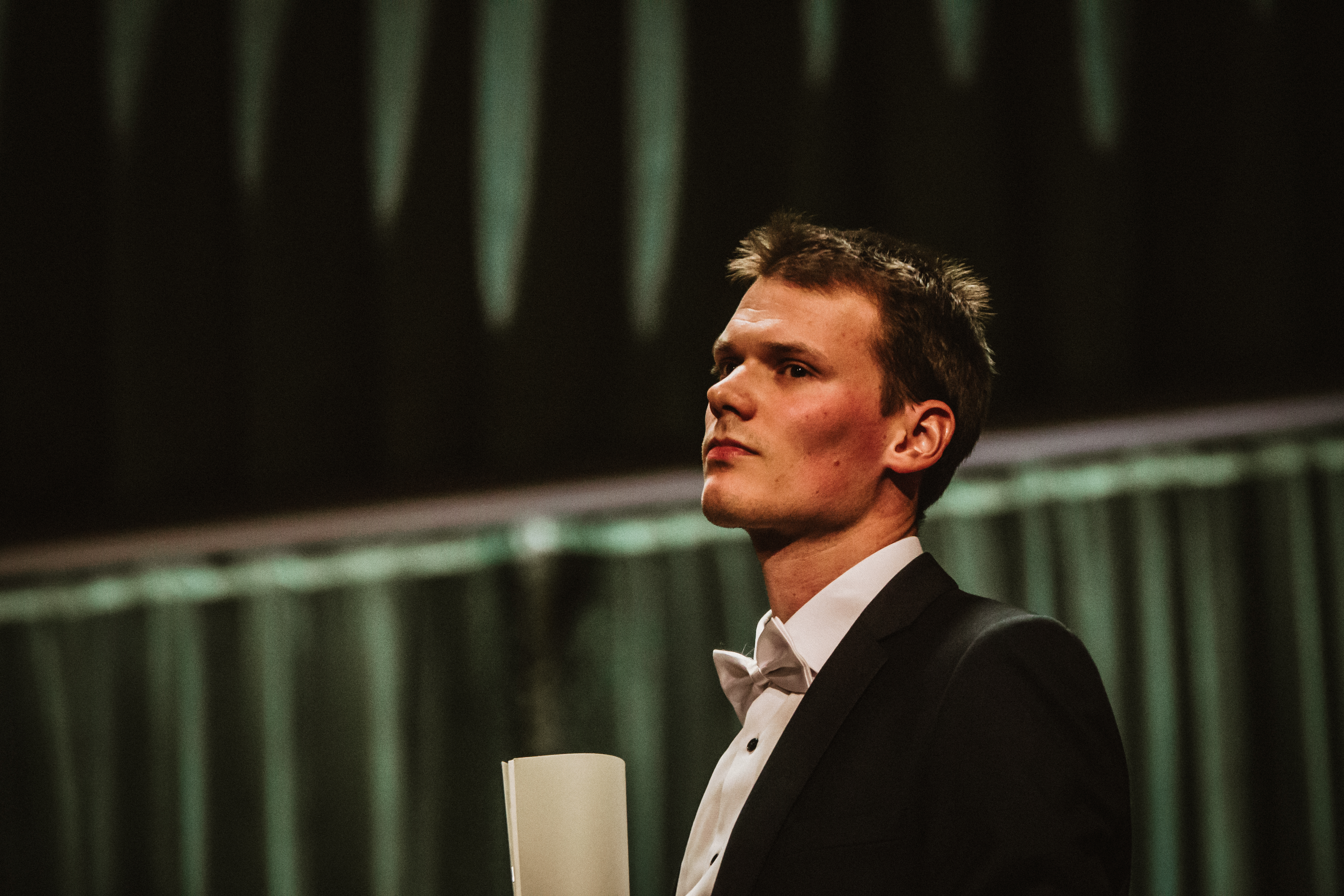

Background information
- Born: 9 November 1990 (age 35); Győr, Hungary
- Genres: Contemporary music
- Occupation: Composer
- Years active: 2010–present
- Website: baloghmate.com

Máté Balogh (born 9 November 1990 in Győr) is a Hungarian composer, performer and assistant professor at the Franz Liszt Academy of Music in Budapest and at the University of Szeged. His works have been performed internationally at contemporary music festivals and concert series in Europe, Asia, Africa and North America, and he has received composition awards in a range of competitions and artistic programmes all over the world.

== Early life and education ==
Balogh was born in Győr, Hungary, in 1990 and raised up in the industrial town of Dunaújváros, formerly known as Stalin City. He studied composition at the Franz Liszt Academy of Music in Budapest, where he was a student of Zoltán Jeney. During his studies, he spent an academic year at the Conservatorio di Musica Giuseppe Tartini in Trieste, Italy, studying with Fabio Nieder. He later was the mentee of Péter Eötvös and also attended the masterclasses of György Kurtág, Louis Andriessen, Christian Wolff, Heinz Holliger, Philip Glass and Toshio Hosokawa.

== Composer's career ==
His pieces have been performed throughout Europe as well as in China, Japan, Taiwan, Turkey, Azerbaijan, Ethiopia, South-Africa, Canada and the United States of America. Additionally, his music has been included at many international festivals, such as: Manifeste (Paris), MicroFest (Prague), ECCO Concert Series (Brussels), Milano Musica (Milan), Corti, chiese e cortili (Bologna), Opus Amadeus (Istanbul), Kurtág & Ungarn (Bern), Open Recorder Days (Amsterdam), Listening to China (Shanghai), Ostrava Days and Janáček May (Ostrava), Axes Kraków (Kraków), New Music Forum (Ljubljana), Music Tribune (Osijek), Secret Kiss (Tokyo), RenMus (Budapest, Bratislava, Prague, Warsaw).

A recurring aspect of his compositional work is the engagement with non-Western musical traditions. Several of his compositions have been written for or incorporate elements of East Asian musical practice, including works composed for traditional Chinese orchestra and performances in East Asia.

He had been resident composer of the Győr Philharmonic Orchestra in the 2021–22 season, where he composed his 1st Symphony as a grotesque homage to J. Haydn.

He is the composer of the Hungarian Pavilion of the 61. Venice Biennale. He created a sound-sculpture on Endre Koronczi's metal objects.

Balogh composed the music for the feature film One Day (directed by Zsófia Szilágyi, 2018). The film was awarded the FIPRESCI Prize at the Cannes Film Festival, bringing international attention to its artistic achievements. Later he was invited to compose the score to Szilágyi's film January 2, which was premiered at La Biennale di Venezia in 2024.

His scores are published by the Universal Music Publishing Editio Musica Budapest, Universal Edition (Vienna), Impronta Edition (Mannheim), and the Helvetia Verlag.

== Academic career ==
Alongside his compositional activity, Balogh teaches music theory and classical form theory at the Franz Liszt Academy of Music in Budapest and at the University of Szeged. He has been involved in international educational and artistic projects and gave academic lectures at the Conservatorio di Trieste, University of Music and Theatre in Leipzig, Stanisław Moniuszko Academy of Music in Gdańsk, The Estonian Academy of Music and Theatre in Tallinn, the Shanghai Conservatory of Music and the University of Alabama in Huntsville.

He received a Doctor of Liberal Arts degree from the Liszt Academy of Music in 2019 and has become habilitated doctor in 2025.

== Works (selection) ==
- 2012: Luca Marenzio in Salzburg (for string orchestra) - awarded by ECSA
- 2015: Kikaku&Basho (for soprano sax and harp) - on a zen-buddhist koan
- 2015: 7 Ant(hem)s (for cello and piano) - Hommage to Péter Esterházy
- 2016: Jam Quartet (for flute, triangles, piano and cello)
- 2017: Odes (for traditional Chinese orchestra) - commissioned by the Ministry of Culture of the People's Republic of China
- 2018: Kipling's Speech (for recitation and chamber group) - commissioned by the Karl-Amadeus-Hartmann Gesellschaft, Munich
- 2019: One Hundred Famous View of Edo (for bass-instruments and 12 gongs) - on the 150th Anniversary of Japanese-Hungarian Diplomatic Relations
- 2019: Alabama March (for symphony orchestra) - dedicated to the bicentennial of State Alabama.
- 2019: Bahnmusik (for string orchestra) - commissioned by the Hungarian Radio.
- 2022: Symphony Nr. 1 - commissioned by the Győr Philharmonic Orchestra
- 2023: Horn Speech 2023 (for solo horn) - awarded at the MicroFest Prague
- 2024: Thoreau Second Hand (for chamber orchestra) - commissioned by the UMZE Ensemble
- 2025: Timpani Speech - (for 5 timpani) - awarded at the Résonance Infinity, Lyon.

== Awards, prizes (selection) ==
- 2010: 1st Prize – Chanson Competition of the University of Theatre and Film Arts (Budapest) for the chanson entitled "Women and Men", composed for soprano and piano
- 2011: 1st Prize – The Composer Competition of the Hungarian National Choir (Budapest) for the piece entitled 'The Four Parts of the Year' composed for 8-part mixed choir
- 2011: 1st Prize – Composer Competition of the Liszt Academy (Budapest) for the piece 'Seven Words' for soprano and bass-clarinet
- 2013: 3rd Prize – UMZF Composer Competition (Budapest) for the piece entitled 'Notturni a L'
- 2013: Winner of the ‘Out at S.E.A.’ Opera Competition of the Péter Eötvös Foundation (Budapest-Paris-Milan-Riga) with his composition of the role of 'Thin' of Mrozek's play Out at Sea
- 2015: 2nd Prize- UMZF Composer Competition (Budapest) for the orchestral piece ‘Quintet’
- 2015: 1st Prize – UMZF Composer Competition (Budapest) for the ensemble-piece ‘Melodiemusik’
- 2015: Honorary Award – GENERACE Composer Competition (Ostrava) for the ensemble piece ‘The Labyrinth of the World and the Paradise of the Heart’
- 2015: Winner of the ECCO Competition of the European Composers’ and Songwriters’ Alliance (Bruxelles) with his piece for three string quartets called 'Luca Marenzio in Salzburg'
- 2016: Artisjus Prize (Budapest) 'The Best Junior Classical-Composer of the Year'
- 2017: 1st Prize – UMZF Composer Competition (Budapest) for the wind orchestral piece 'Pseudomarsch'
- 2018: Honorable Mention – Composer Competition of the Central European String Quartet (Budapest) for the piece 'Lerchenquartett'
- 2018: Junior Prima Prize (Budapest) awarded for outstanding achievement in composition
- 2018: 2nd Prize – ‘Beethoven in Buda’ Composer Competition (Budapest) for the chamber piece 'Game'
- 2019: Fidelio 50 Prize (Budapest) Given by Fidelio.hu in Classical Music Category
- 2020: Salvatore Quasimodo Prize awarded for incorporating literature into music (for the piece 'Ami marad')
- 2020: ‘Support Excellence’ Award – Composer Competition of the Central European String Quartet (Budapest) for the piece 'Recitativo prosecco'
- 2020: 3rd Prize – GENERACE Composer Competition (Ostrava) for the string orchestral piece Bahnmusik
- 2021: 5th Prize – Gilgamesh Composer Competition (Los Angeles) for the chamber piece ‘Gilgamesh-Recitations’
- 2021: 3rd Prize – II. Impronta Composer Competition (Mannheim) for the string quartet ‘Der Rhein am Tomasee’
- 2022: 3rd Prize – Fanfare Competition of the Veszprém Cultural Capital of Europe Program for the piece Fanfara Gisella
- 2022: Franz Erkel Prize (Budapest) prestigious award for composition by the Hungarian State
- 2023: Honorable Award – Free Range Composer Competition (London) for his piece 'Bahnmusik'
- 2023: One of the four winners of RenMus Project (Warsaw – Prague – Bratislava – Budapest) with his piece 'Thoreau Second Hand' associated with renewability and sustainability
- 2023: Artisjus Prize (Budapest) The Piece of the Year, with ‘Sinfonia No.1’
- 2023: 1st Prize – ’MicroFest Prague’ Composer Competition (Prague) for the piece Horn Speech 2023 - Hommage a Gy. Ligeti
- 2023: One of the winners of ’Fifteen-Minutes-Of-Fame’ (Washington D.C.) with the chamber piece Satmar Song
- 2024: 1st Prize – ’Friedrich Schiller’ Composer Competition (Trieste) with the song 'An Emma'
- 2024: One of the winners of Das Rucksack Project (Austria) with his piece Seepferdchen und Flugfische
- 2024: One of the winners of Music Madness Project (Durham, NC) with the piece Der Rhein am Tomasee
- 2025: One of the winners of ‘Ragazze e ragazzi’ Composer Competition (Bologna) with his piece 'La fontana malata'
- 2025: 3rd Prize – ‘Begüm Aslan’ Composer Competition (Frankfurt a. M.) with his piece 'Du, du, du'
- 2025: ‘Coup de Pouce’ Award – Festival Résonance Infinity (Lyon, France) with the piece Timpani Speech
- 2026: 1st Prize - Edwin Schulhoff Composer Competition (Vienna, Austria) with the piece Dadamusik
