= Széchenyi Academy of Literature and Arts =

The Széchenyi Academy of Literature and Arts (Hungarian: Széchenyi Irodalmi és Művészeti Akadémia, pronounced [ˈseːt͡ʃeːɲi ˈirodɒlmi ˈeːʃ ˈmyːveːsɛti ˈɒkɒdeːmijɒ]) was created in 1992 as an academy associated yet independent from the Hungarian Academy of Sciences. It is intended to be the national academy of artists and writers, who could be elected to the HAS until the 1949 reforms. The president is Károly Makk, film director. Earlier it was László Dobszay (resigned on April 20, 2011).

== Notable members ==
- Eva Haldimann, swiss literary critic and translator from Hungarian into German
- Gyula Csapó, composer
- László Dobszay, music historian
- Miklós Jancsó, film director
- Zoltán Jeney, composer
- Ferenc Juhász, poet
- Károly Klimó, painter, graphic
- Zoltán Kocsis, pianist-conductor
- György Konrád, writer
- György Kurtág, composer
- Dora Maurer, visual artist
- Péter Nádas, writer
- György Spiró, writer
- István Szabó, film director
- Magda Szabó, writer
- László Vidovszky, composer

== See also ==
- Hungarian Academy of Arts (Magyar Művészeti Akadémia)
