= Eva Haldimann =

Swiss literary critic and translator (1927–2019)

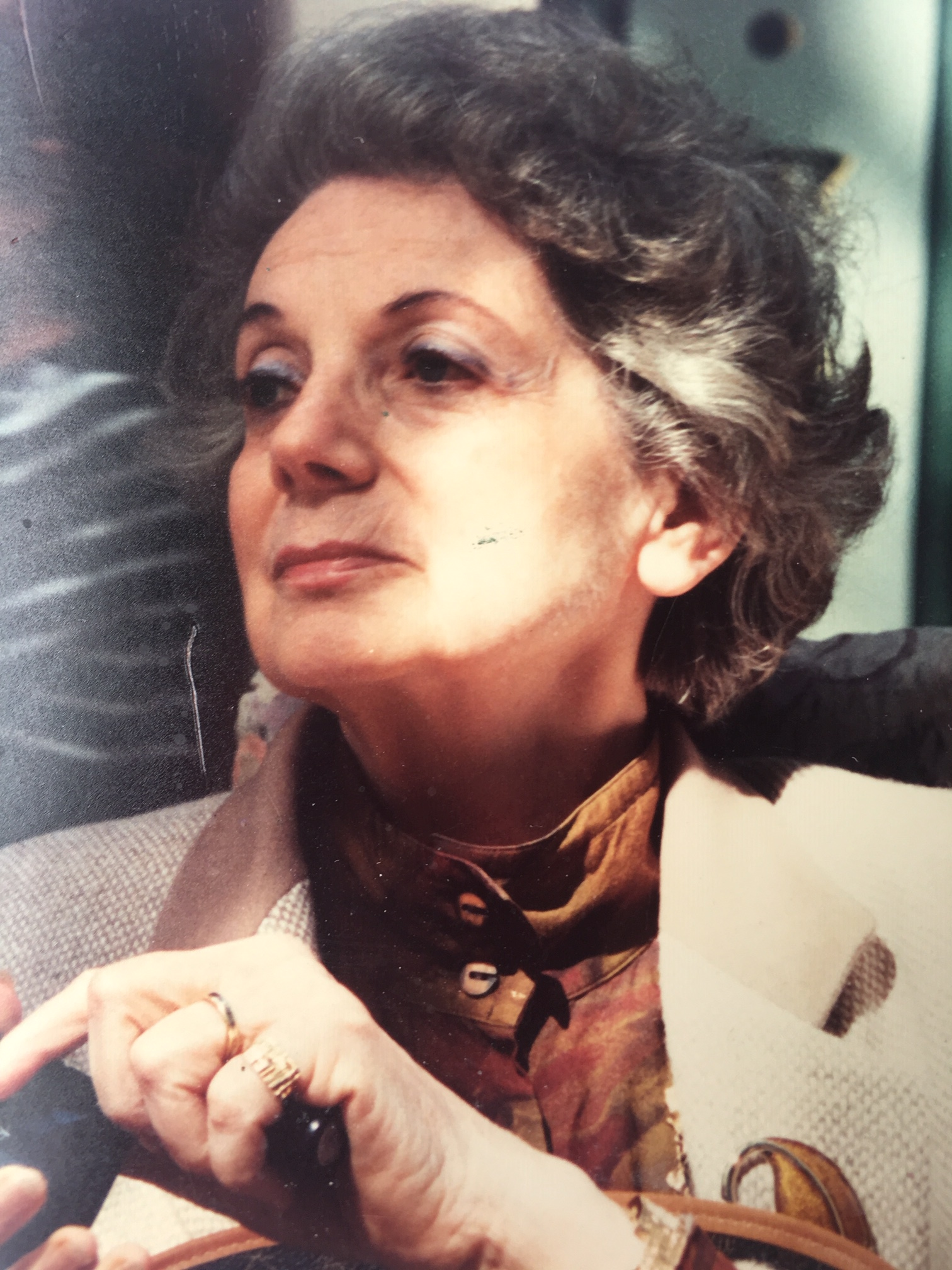
- Born: Román; 8 March 1927
- Died: 15 September 2019 (aged 92)
- Known for: Letter to Eva Haldimann

Eva Haldimann (née Román; 8 March 1927 – 15 September 2019) was a Swiss literary critic and translator from Hungarian into German.

== Biography ==
=== Education ===
Eva Haldimann received her PhD from the University of Zurich in 1956. Her thesis subject was about critical studies of translations of William Shakespeare.

=== Literacy critic ===
She started a career as a literary critic in 1963 in the Swiss German newspaper Neue Zürcher Zeitung, particularly on contemporary Hungarian literature. She wrote more than 300 reviews and her credo was: See what Hungarian literature has to offer, in terms of quality, it can compete with the great European literature.

On 19 March 1977 she wrote a literary review of the novel Fatelessness by the Hungarian writer Imre Kertesz, describing it as the "novel of a desperate man" that helped to make it known in the West. Imre Kertész discovered by chance criticism in an abandoned newspaper in a Budapest swimming pool and a correspondence between literary critic and the writer began, also accompanied by several personal encounters. Imre Kertesz's letters were published in 2009 under the title Letters to Eva Haldimann.

Eva Haldimann was also a translator from Hungarian into German of several novels by the writer Magda Szabo.

== Prize ==
1991: Order of Merit of the Republic of Hungary in recognition of its activity in the popularization of Hungarian literary works abroad

1992: Honorary member of the Széchenyi Academy of Literature and Arts,
