= László Sáry =

Hungarian composer, pianist and music educator (1940–2026)

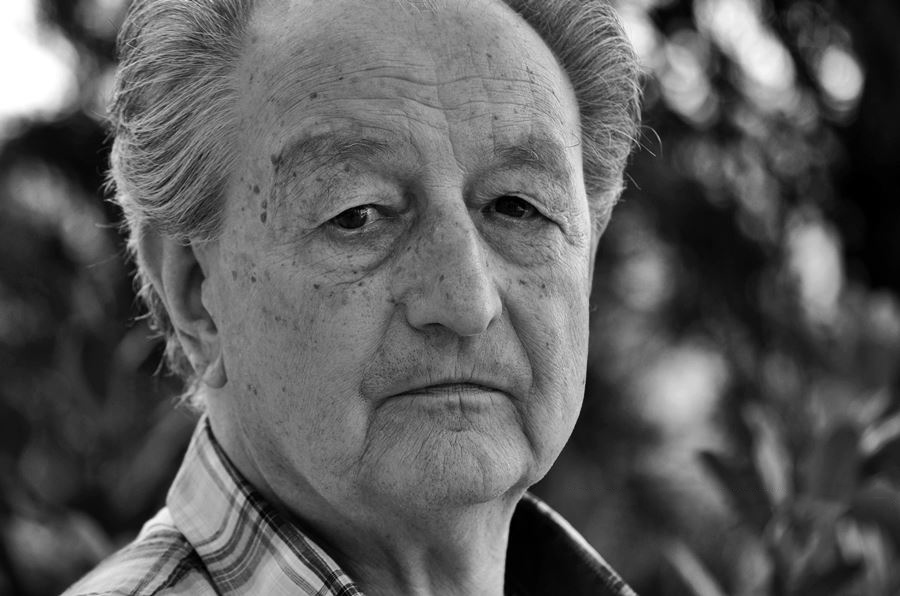
- Photo by Gáspár Stekovics
- Born: 1 January 1940; Győr, Hungary
- Died: 13 November 2026 (aged 86)
- Education: Franz Liszt Academy of Music
- Occupations: Composer; Pianist; Academic teacher
- Organizations: Budapest New Music Studio; József Katona Theatre; University of Theatre and Film Arts in Budapest
- Notable work: Pentagram; Studies for Steam Engines; Locomotive Symphony; Creative Music Activities
- Awards: Ferenc Erkel Prize; Bartók–Pásztory Award; Merited Artist of Hungary; Excellent Artist of Hungary

László Sáry (1 January 1940 – 13 November 2026) was a Hungarian composer, pianist and music educator. He was a founding member of Új Zenei Stúdió (Budapest New Music Studio) and developed the Creative Music Practice pedagogical method, teaching it as professor of the University of Theatre and Film Arts in Budapest and on international workshops. He composed operas, orchestral works, chamber music and vocal works, mostly for traditional instruments but including "the sounds of everyday life, rhythm, repetition, silence and chance". He was open to experimenting and collaborative creation. He and his works achieved several awards.

== Life and career ==
=== Early life and education ===
László Sáry was born in Győr on 1 January 1940, and grew up in a railway service apartment in a village near Pannonhalma, where his father worked as a stationmaster. He experienced the noise of the locomotives, leading to an "enduring love of rhythm and sounds". From 1961 to 1966, he studied composition with Endre Szervánszky at the Franz Liszt Academy of Music in Budapest. His teacher introduced him to works by Guillaume de Machaut, Johannes Ockeghem and Jacob Obrecht among others, and their "linear way of thinking" influenced his composing.

=== Budapest New Music Studio and compositional style ===
Sáry's early works drew on the style of Béla Bartók, before shifting toward the techniques of Pierre Boulez and Karlheinz Stockhausen. In 1970, at the initiative of Albert Simon, Sáry co-founded Új Zenei Stúdió (Budapest New Music Studio) with Zoltán Jeney, László Vidovszky, Péter Eötvös, Zoltán Kocsis, György Kurtág and György Kurtág jr., among others. Between 1972 and 1990, the ensemble premiered over 600 contemporary works in Hungary and abroad, with Sáry participating as both composer and performer. His work with the studio included group improvisation and collective compositions, such as Pentagram (1982).

In 1972, Sáry attended the Darmstädter Ferienkurse on a scholarship, where he met American composer Christian Wolff and studied scores by Wolff, John Cage, Earle Brown, and Steve Reich. Until then he had heard "astonishingly little Western music".

Following this visit, he composed Sounds for... (Hangok, 1972), moving away from traditional European harmonic and structural conventions. During the 1970s and 1980s, his compositions frequently used repetitive patterns, chordal sequences (A Continuity of Rotative Chords, 1982), scale groupings (Ludus Cromaticus, 1987), and pitch permutations (Fives Repeated, 1985, constructed from 120 permutations of five pitches). Working with electronics and musique concrète, he composed the tape piece Studies for Steam Engines (Etűdök gőzmozdonyokra, 1996), which placed third at the seventh International Rostrum of Electroacoustic Music in Vienna in 1998.

His publisher summarised that he "sought new kinds of order capable of being developed in music", using controlled randomness and non-musical interconnections such as mathematical systems to organise sounds and rhythms. He wrote mostly for traditional instruments, but also included "the sounds of everyday life, rhythm, repetition, silence and chance". He was open to experimenting and collaborative creation.

=== Pedagogy ===
In the mid-1970s, Sáry began developing a pedagogical system titled Creative Music Practice (Kreatív zenei gyakorlatok, also referred to as the "Sáry Method"), consisting of exercises focused on improvisation, concentration, and ensemble listening. He published the methodology as a book in 1999. Sáry taught as professor of music performing practice at the University of Theatre and Film Arts in Budapest from 1990, using his exercises. He also conducted workshops of them for music teachers in Japan, the United Kingdom, France, Italy, Belgium, and Estonia. Starting in 1994, he participated in Yehudi Menuhin's MUSE educational program for disadvantaged children.

=== Film and theatre ===
From the early 1980s, Sáry composed incidental music for theatre and film. In 1990, he became the music director of the József Katona Theatre in Budapest. In 1996, he spent three months in Tokyo on a Japan Foundation fellowship studying traditional Japanese theater, dance, and music. His Studies for Steam Engines achieved a third prize at the International Rostrum of Electroacoustic Music. He became a member of the Széchenyi Academy of Literature and Arts in 1999.

=== Personal life ===
Sáry's brother was composer József Sári. His son Bánk Sáry (b.1973) is also a composer.

Sáry died on 13 November 2026, at the age of 86.

== Compositions ==
Sáry's compositions include:

=== Stage and vocal ===
- I. Kantáta (1968)
- Hold-ének (1982)
- Adorjánok és Jenők, opera (1994)
- Theomachia, oratorio drama (2002)
- Négerek, opera (2004)
- Ének a kőszívű királyról, chamber opera (2006)
- Finnugor oratórium (2016)

=== Orchestral and ensemble ===
- Canzone solenne for symphony orchestra (1970)
- Musica per 24 archi e 24 fiati (1977)
- Concerto Classico for chamber orchestra (1980)
- Hüperion sorsdala (Hyperion's Song of Destiny) for string orchestra (1986)
- Concerto obligát szaxofonokra (1993)

=== Chamber, solo, and electroacoustic ===
- Sounds for... (Hangok), for unspecified instruments (1972)
- Kotyogó kő egy korsóban (Pebble rattling in a pot) (1978)
- Pentagramm (1982)
- Egy akkordsor forgatókönyve (A Continuity of Rotative Chords) (1982)
- Ismétlődő ötös (Fives Repeated) (1985)
- Ludus Cromaticus (1987)
- Tánczene (Dance Music) (1989–2000)
- Etűdök gőzmozdonyokra (Studies for Steam Engines), tape (1996)
- Locomotive Symphony, tape (1997)

== Books ==
- Kreatív zenei gyakorlatok (Creative Music Activities), Jelenkor Kiadó (1999)

== Honours and awards ==
- 1979 – Kassák Award
- 1986 – Ferenc Erkel Prize
- 1993 – Bartók–Pásztory Award
- 1998 – 3rd Prize, Seventh International Rostrum of Electroacoustic Music (Vienna)
- 1999 – Elected full member of the Széchenyi Academy of Literature and Arts
- 2000 – Merited Artist of Hungary
- 2008 – Excellent Artist of Hungary
- 2016 – Artisjus Award for classical composition of the year
