= Group 180 =

Group 180 (Hungarian: 180-as Csoport) was a Hungarian ensemble dedicated to the performance of new music, active from 1978 until 1990. The group achieved recognition for their performances and recordings of contemporary music in the minimal style. Group 180's membership included several young Hungarian composers (among them László Melis and Tibor Szemző), whose works formed an important part of the ensemble's repertoire. This brought the group prominence as one of the preeminent European new music ensembles, and brought international attention to the emerging trend of Hungarian minimalism.

In addition to works by Hungarian composers, Group 180 also performed works by minimal composers from other nations, such as Philip Glass, Roberto Carnevale, Steve Reich and Frederic Rzewski.

Group 180 released several recordings on the Hungaroton label.
