= Péter Forgács =

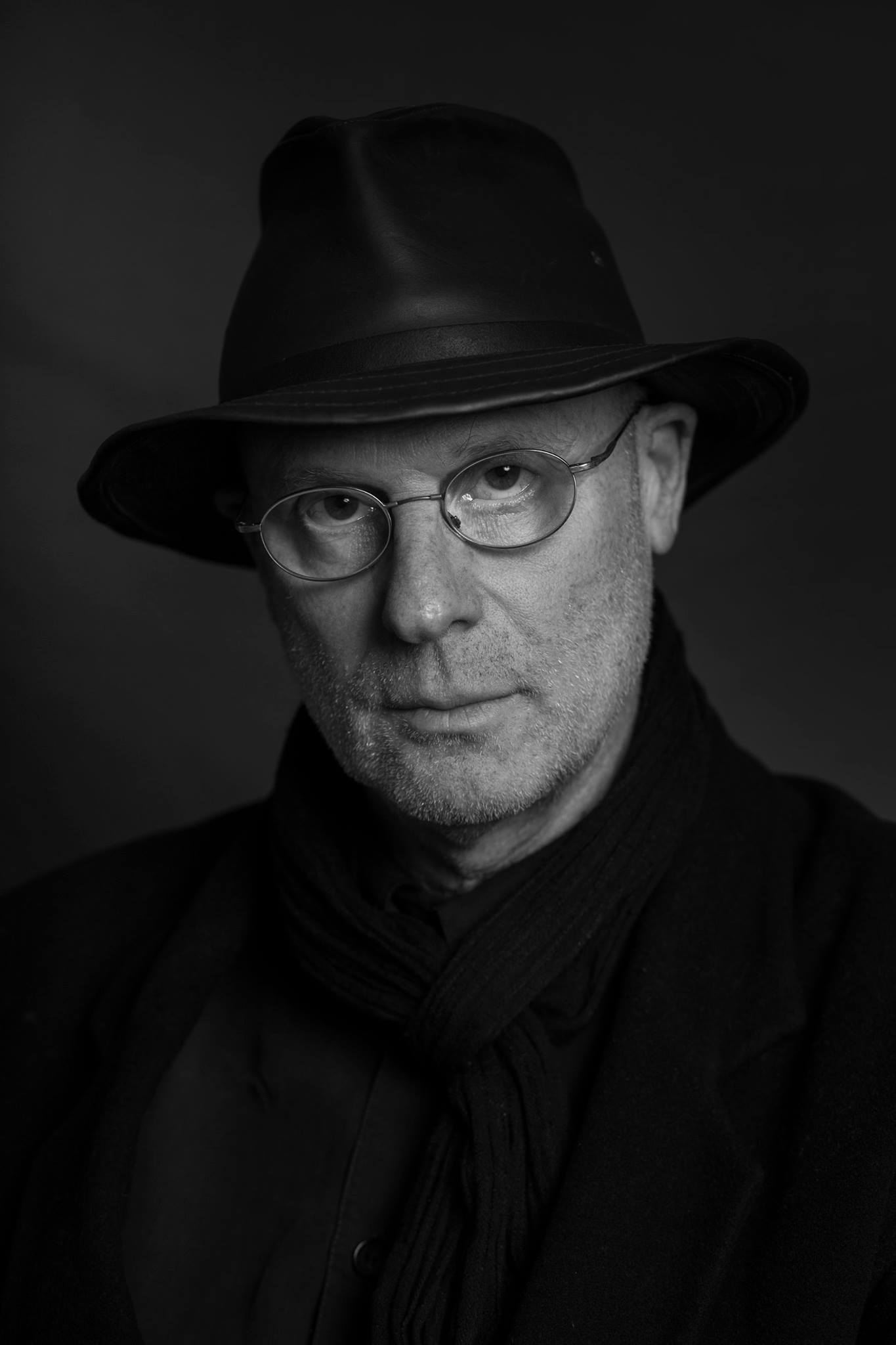
- Péter Forgács
- Born: 10 September 1950 (age 75)
- Known for: art, film
- Notable work: Private Hungary Series, El Perro Negro, Miss Universe 1929, Wittgenstein Tractatus, The Maelstrom, The Danube Exodus

'Péter Forgács (born 10 September 1950) Hungarian media artist and filmmaker. Best known for his "Private Hungary" series of award-winning films based on found-footage home movies from 1930s to the 1970s, which document ordinary lives that were soon to be ruptured by an extraordinary historical trauma that occurs off-screen.

== Biography ==
Since 1976 Péter Forgács has been active in the Hungarian art scene as media artist/filmmaker. In the late 1970s and '80s he collaborated with the contemporary music ensemble Group 180, at the same time he started to work in the Béla Balázs Filmstudio. Forgács established the Private Photo & Film Archives Foundation (PPFA, 1983) in Budapest, a unique collection of amateur film footage from the '920, and has made this material "the raw data" for his unique postmodern re-orchestrations of history. In 2000-2002, created The Danube Exodus: Rippling Currents of the River installation,Getty Center https://www.getty.edu/, The Getty Museum and Research Institute later exhibited in New York, San Francisco, Brussels, Budapest, Helsinki, Berlin, Ulm, Kolozsvár-Cluj. His international film debut came with the Bartos Family (1988), which was awarded the Grand Prix at the World Wide Video Festival in The Hague (1990). Since Forgács has received several international festival awards in Budapest, Lisbon, Marseille, San Francisco International Film Festival, the Documentary Golden Gate Award 1998, Tribeca Film Festival 2005; and received the Prix Europe, Berlin European TV Documentary of the Year Award 1997. Forgács received the 2007 Erasmus Prize, which is "awarded to a person or institution which has made an exceptionally important contribution to culture in Europe." In 2009 Forgács represented Hungary at the Venice Biennale, exhibiting the Col Tempo - The W. Project installation. In 2013 Forgacs created the ″Letters to Afar″ video installation at Museum of the History of Polish Jews in Warsaw with The Klezmatics Group; and at EYE Netherlands Filmmuseum Amsterdam the "Looming Fire - Stories from The Dutch East Indies 1900-1940" installation.

== Filmography ==
Filmography
- 2017 Kemény 80 Picturesque Epochs II. 70 min HD video
- 2016 Venom HD Video 30 min. novel and narration by Zsófia Bán
- 2015 - Mária Gánóczy Painter - Picturesque Epochs I.
- 2011 - GermanUnity@Balaton-Honeyland - produced by Lumen Film, Amsterdam / Uj Budapest Film / ZDF/ARTE - HD video
- 2009 - Video Active - documentary - for Video Active EU TV online archive promo - web version
- 2009 - Hunky Blues - The American Dream - produced by Filmpartners Ltd. - HD CAM
- 2008 - I am Von Höfler - Private Hungary 15 (video)
- 2007 - Own Death - fiction film - novel by Péter Nádas (HD video)
- 2006 - Miss Universe 1929 - Lisl Goldarbeiter - a Queen in Wien (HD video)
- 2005 - El Perro Negro - Stories from the Spanish Civil War (HD video)
- 2004 - Do You Really Love Me? (video)
- 2004 - Mutual Analysis (video)
- 2003 - Der Kaiser auf dem Spaziergang - light & image project (Installation and HD video)
- 2002 - The Bishop’s Garden - Private Hungary 14 (video)
- 2001 - A Bibó Reader - Private Hungary 13 (35mm film and video)
- 1999 - Angelos’ Film (video)
- 1998 - The Danube Exodus (video )
- 1997 - The Maelstrom - A Family Chronic (video)
- 1997 - Kádár’s Kiss - Private Hungary 12 (video)
- 1997 - Class Lot - Private Hungary 11 (video)
- 1996 - Free Fall - Private Hungary 10 (video)
- 1996 - The Land of Nothing - Private Hungary 9 (video)
- 1994 - Meanwhile Somewhere 1940-43... (video)
- 1994 - The Notes of a Lady - Private Hungary 8 (video)
- 1994 - Hungarian Totem (video)
- 1993 - Conversations on Psychoanalysis - documentary series 5/5
- 1993 - Simply Happy - with Albert Wulffers (35mm film and video)
- 1993 - Culture Shavings (video)
- 1992 - Bourgeoisie Dictionary - Private Hungary 7 (video)
- 1992 - Wittgenstein Tractatus - INTERLUDE series (video)
- 1991 - Arizona diary - with poet György Petri (video)
- 1991 - Photographed by László Dudás - Private Hungary 6 (video)
- 1991 - D-FILM - Private Hungary 5 (video)
- 1991 - Márai Herbal - INTERLUDE series (video)
- 1990 - The Diary of Mr. N. - Private Hungary 4 (video)
- 1989 - Either - Or - Private Hungary 3 (video)
- 1989 - Dusi & Jenő - Private Hungary 2 (video)
- 1988 - The Bartos Family - Private Hungary 1 (video)
- 1987 - Episodes from the Life of Professor M.F. (video)
- 1986 - The Portrait of Leopold Szondi (video)
- 1985 - Spinoza Rückwertz (35mm film)
- 1978 - I See That I Look (video)

== Installations and performances ==
- 2013 - Forgacs created the ″Letters to Afar″ video installation at the Museum of the History of Polish Jews, Warsaw with The Klezmatics Group;
- 2013 - "Looming Fire - Stories from The Dutch East Indies 1900-1940" installation. at EYE Netherlands Filmmuseum Amsterdam the
- German Unity @ Balaton - Deutsche Einheit am Balaton – Die private Geschichte der deutsch-deutschen Einheit • media installation with Gusztav Hamos • Collegium Hungaricum Berlin • 2009 • Dortmund • 2010 • Vaszary Villa - Balatonfüred/Hungary • 2010
- Col Tempo - The W. Project • installation • 53rd Venice Biennale • Hungarian Pavilion • curator András Rényi • • 2009 •

- Rembrandt Morphs • installation • Newcastle UK. 2006
- Danube Exodus, The • installation • 2002 The Getty Museum and Research Institute CAL. LA.
- Der Kaiser auf dem Spaziergang • video installation • Light and Image • Aegina • 1996
- The Case of My Room, • video installation • 1994 Laing Art Gallery *
- Dixi & Pixi • video performance with Dixi, Group 180, L. Lugo Lugosi • 1982
- Dream Inventory • installation • 1995 Kiscell Municipal Museum, Budapest.
- Free Fall • Oratorio • Film • 1997 • Music Tibor Szemző • Prix Europe • Berlin - The Documetary Film of the Year 1997
- Educational Cinema • installation • 2005 Kunsthalle, Budapest
- The Hung Aryan, • Video Installation • 1997 • Budapest Gallery
- Hungarian Totem • installation • 1995
- Hungarian Video Kitchen Art • video installation • 1991
- INAUGURATION • video performance • 1978
- Monomotapa & The Game (the "Kempelen" installation video - with György Jovánovics • 2007) Kunsthalle Budapest, ZKM-Karlsruhe
- New York - BUDAPEST • paintings-photos with L.Lugó Lugosi • 1984
- Paintings & photographs • One man show - Fotohof Salzburg • 1987
- Pre Morgue • video installation • 1993 • The Batterfly Effect Exhibition Kunsthalle Budapest
- Private Exits • performance with Szemzõ • 1985
- Saloon, and Then! • installation • 1997
- SIGHT • photo installation • 2004
- Snapshot from the Island • performance with Tibor Szemző • 1984
- Stanley & Livingston • performance • 1979
- Thee á' El Greco • video Installation • 1991
- Two Nests and Other Things • video installation • 1991
- Visit, The • installation • 2004
- Work Desk • video performance and installation with Tibor Szemzõ • 1985

== Awards ==
Awards
- 2020 Dragon of Dragons Award • Lifetime Achievement Award • Cracow International Film Festival, Kraków, Poland
- 2009 I am von Höfler • Hungarian Film Critics Special Award
- 2008 Own Death • Best Experimental Film Prize, 39th Hungarian Film Festival, Budapest
- 2008 I am von Höfler • Creative Documentary Film Prize, 39th Hungarian Film Festival, Budapest
- 2007 Erasmus Prize • Praemium Erasmianum Foundation, Amsterdam The Erasmus Prize is an annual prize awarded by the board of the Praemium Erasmianum Foundation.
- 2006 El perro negro • Documentary Film Grand Prize, 37th Hungarian Film Festival, Budapest
- 2005 El perro negro • The Maysles Brothers Documentary Film Grand Prize, Denver International Film Festival, United States
- 2005 El perro negro • Feature Length Documentary, Grand Prize, Tribeca International Film Festival, New York
- 2001 A Bibó Reader • Official selection Quinzaine des Réalisateurs, Cannes Film Festival, France
- 2001 A Bibó Reader • Best Director Prize of Short & Experimental Film, 33rd Hungarian Film Festival, Budapest
- 2000 Angelos' Film • Documentário Longa Grand Prize, XI Encotros Internacionalis De Cinema Documental, Portugal
- 1999 The Maelstrom • Grand Prize, Out of That Darkness International Film Competition, London
- 1999 Angelos' Film • Documentary Golden Gate Award, the Golden Spire, San Francisco International Film Festival, United States
- 1999 The Maelstrom • The Best Documentary Film Award, Jerusalem International Film Festival, Israel
- 1999 The Danube Exodus • Silver Dragon prize and FIPRESCI prize, Kraków Int. Doc. & Short Film Festival, Poland
- 1999 The Danube Exodus • Documentary Film Grand Prize, 30th Hungarian Film Festival, Budapest
- 1998 The Balázs Béla Film Award, Hungarian Republic, Budapest
- 1999 Free Fall • The Best Documentary-Fiction and the Best Film Music Prize, Hungarian Film Critics Prize, Budapest
- 1997 Free Fall • PRIX EUROPA, Best Non-Fiction Program of the Year, Berlin
- 1997 Free Fall • Grand Prize & CNC "Image de la culture" special award, Marseilles International Documentary Film Festival, France
- 1997 Free Fall • Short & Experimental Film, Grand Prize, Budapest 28th Hungarian Film Festival, Budapest
- 1995 Meanwhile Somewhere • "Lattücht" Prize Dokument, ART 95 Festival, Neubrandenburg, Germany
- 1994 Wittgenstein Tractatus • Grand Prize, Montecattini, Terme, Italy
- 1993 Culture Shavings • St. Germaine de Geneva Prize, 5th Semaine Internationale de Video, Switzerland
- 1993 Wittgenstein Tractatus • Video Grand Prize, VIPER Film & Video Festival, Lucerne, Switzerland
- 1993 Wittgenstein Tractatus • Sound Base Arts Video Festival, Grand Prize, Wrocław, Poland
- 1992 The Private Hungary series • Best Hungarian Documentary Film Prize, Hungarian Film Critics, Budapest
- 1991 Dusi and Jenő • Grand Prix, European Document Film Biennial, Marseilles, France
- 1990 The Bartos Family • Grand Prize, World Wide Video Festival, The Hague, Netherlands

== Works in Public Collections ==
Works in Public Collections
- Museum of Fine Art Budapest · Modern Collection·
- Australian Centre for the Moving Image (ACMI) CINEMEDIA, Melbourne
- C3 Media Art Center, Budapest
- Centre National du Cinématographe, Paris
- Centre Pompidou & Musée d'Art Moderne, Paris
- Getty Museum, Special Collection, Los Angeles
- Harvard College Library, Cambridge, Massachusetts USA
- Haus der Dokumentarfilm collection, Stuttgart
- Hungarian National Gallery, Budapest
- KIASMA Contemporary Art Museum, Helsinki
- Ludwig Contemporary Art Museum, LUMU, Budapest
- Moffitt Library UC Berkeley, California USA
- MOMA, Film and Video collection, New York
- Montreal Cinematheque, Permanent Collection
- Museum of Fine Arts, 20th century Collection, Budapest
- Nederland Filmmuseum, Amsterdam
- New York University, Bobst Library NYU N.Y. USA
- Open Society Archive, CEU, Budapest
- Pacific Film Archives, Berkeley CA USA
- Samlung Oppenheim, Bonn
- Stanford University Library, Green Library, USA
- UIAH Helsinki University Art Department collection
- University of Southern California Film School - Annenberg Center for Communications, Los Angeles
- Yad Vashem, The Visual Center, Jerusalem
- Zentrum für Medien Kunst, ZKM collection, Karlsruhe

== Secondary literature ==
*Cinema’s Alchemist. The Films of Péter Forgács, ed. by Bill Nichols and Michael Renov, Minneapolis, Minn.[etc.] : University of Minnesota Press, 2011
