= Károly Klimó =

Hungarian artist (born 1936)

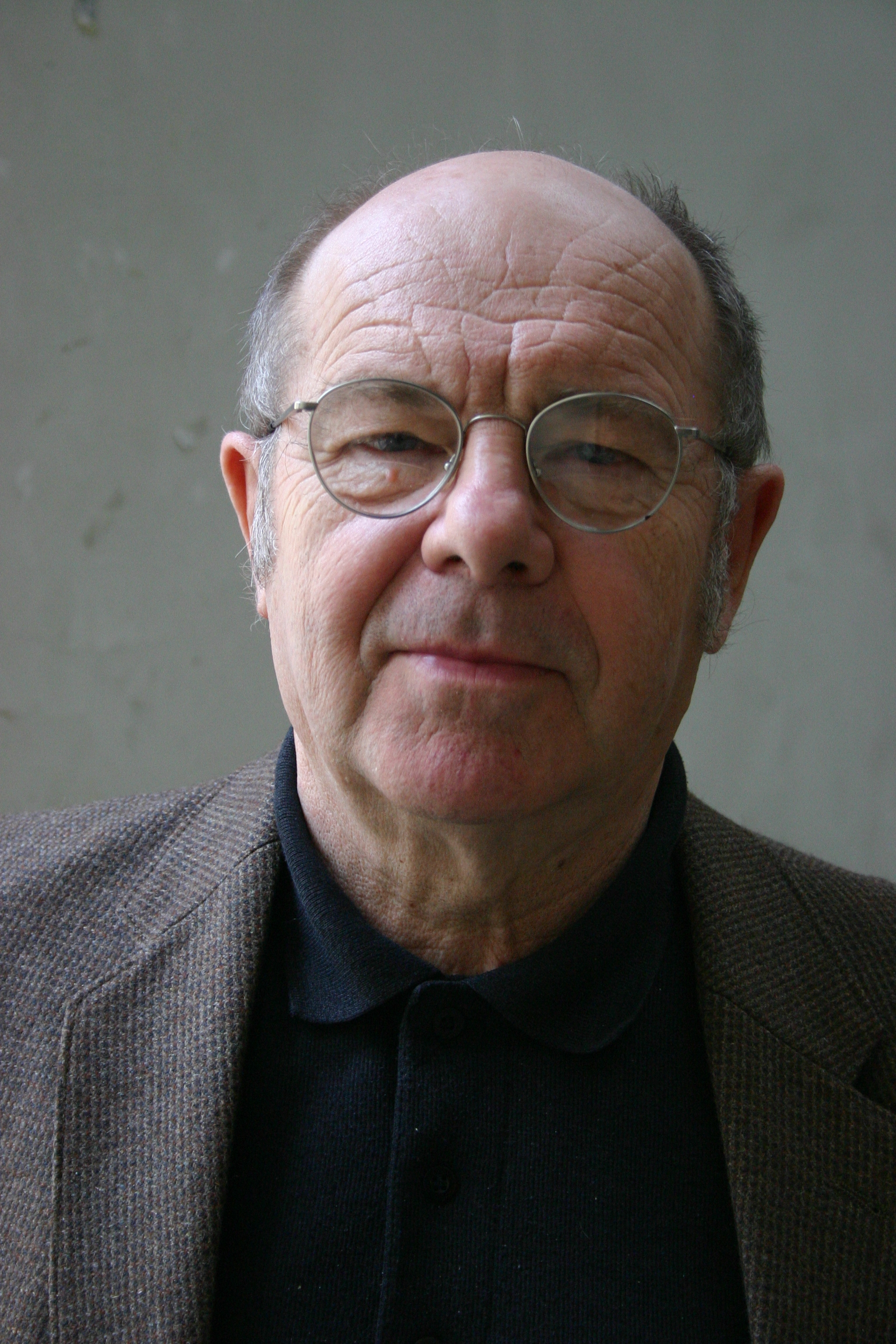
Photograph of the artist

Károly Klimó (Hungarian pronunciation: [ˈkaːroj ˈklimoː]; born 17 May 1936) is a Hungarian artist, one of the best known Hungarian artists of the present day. He is a non-figurative artist, member of the Széchenyi Academy of Literature and Arts.

Born in Békéscsaba, he studied art from 1956 to 1962 at the Hungarian University of Fine Arts, and had his first solo exhibition in 1977 in Budapest. Thereafter, he undertook numerous trips abroad to study in several European countries, the United States, Iran, and South Korea. In 1990, he became a professor at the Academy of Art in Budapest. He currently lives and works in Budapest in the area of the Disk Lake, as well as making frequent stays in Germany and Austria. His work has been exhibited in dozens of solo and group exhibitions around the world, and some of his works are collected at, among other places: the State Art Gallery in Mannheim, Germany, the Albertina in Vienna, the Seoul Art Museum, and the Hungarian National Gallery in Budapest.

== Gallery ==
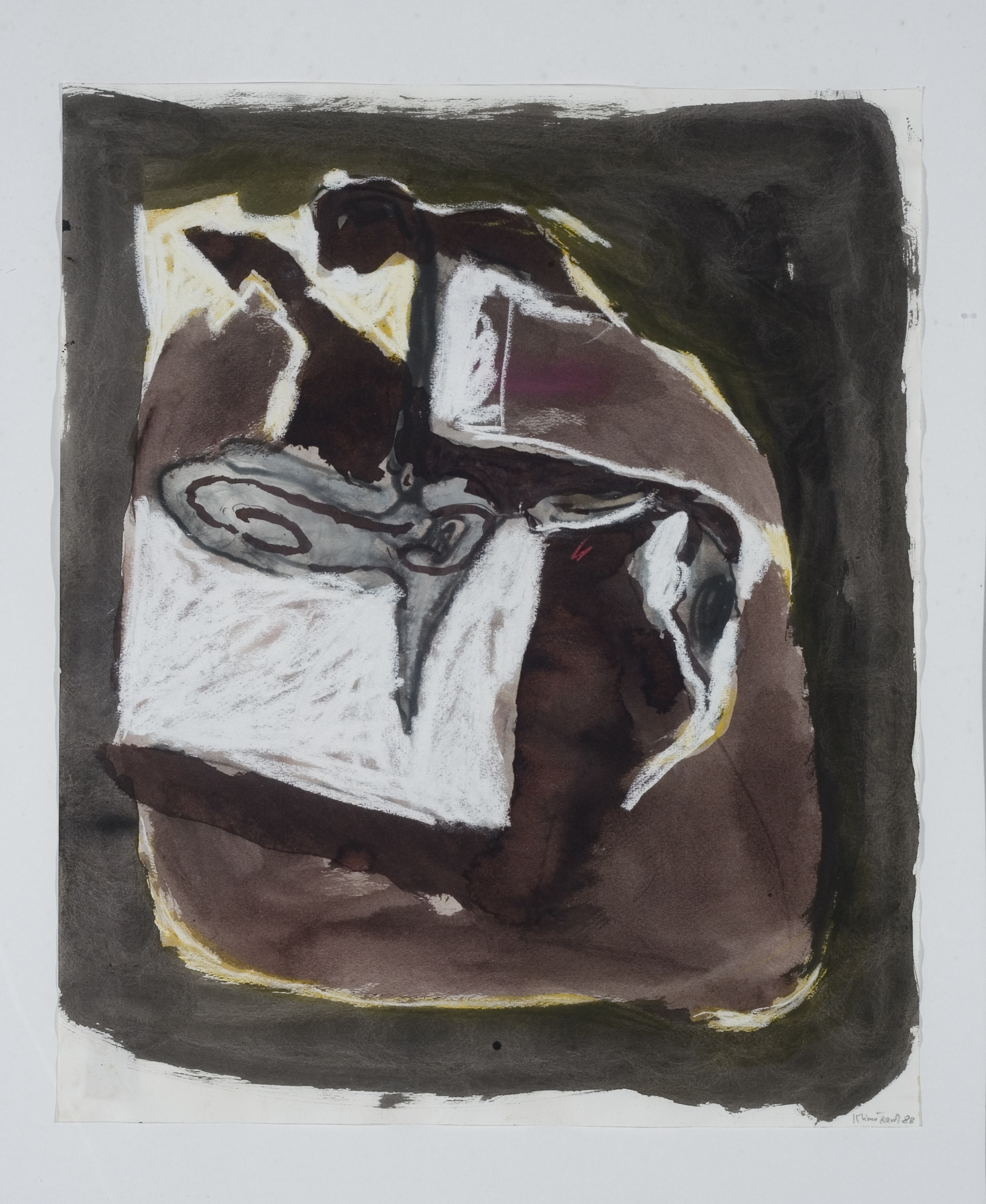
Man and Shadow (1988)

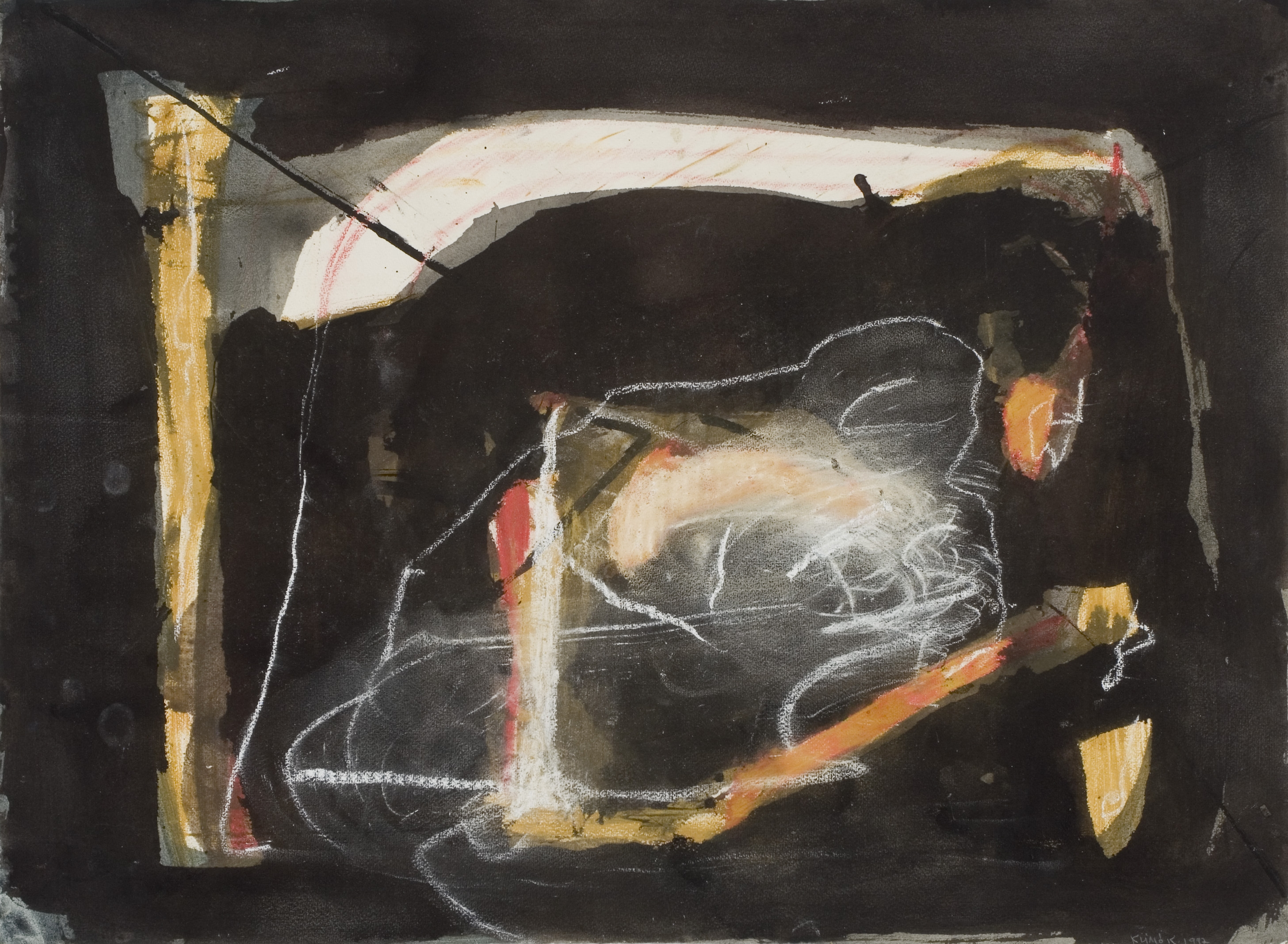
Tangled lights (1997)

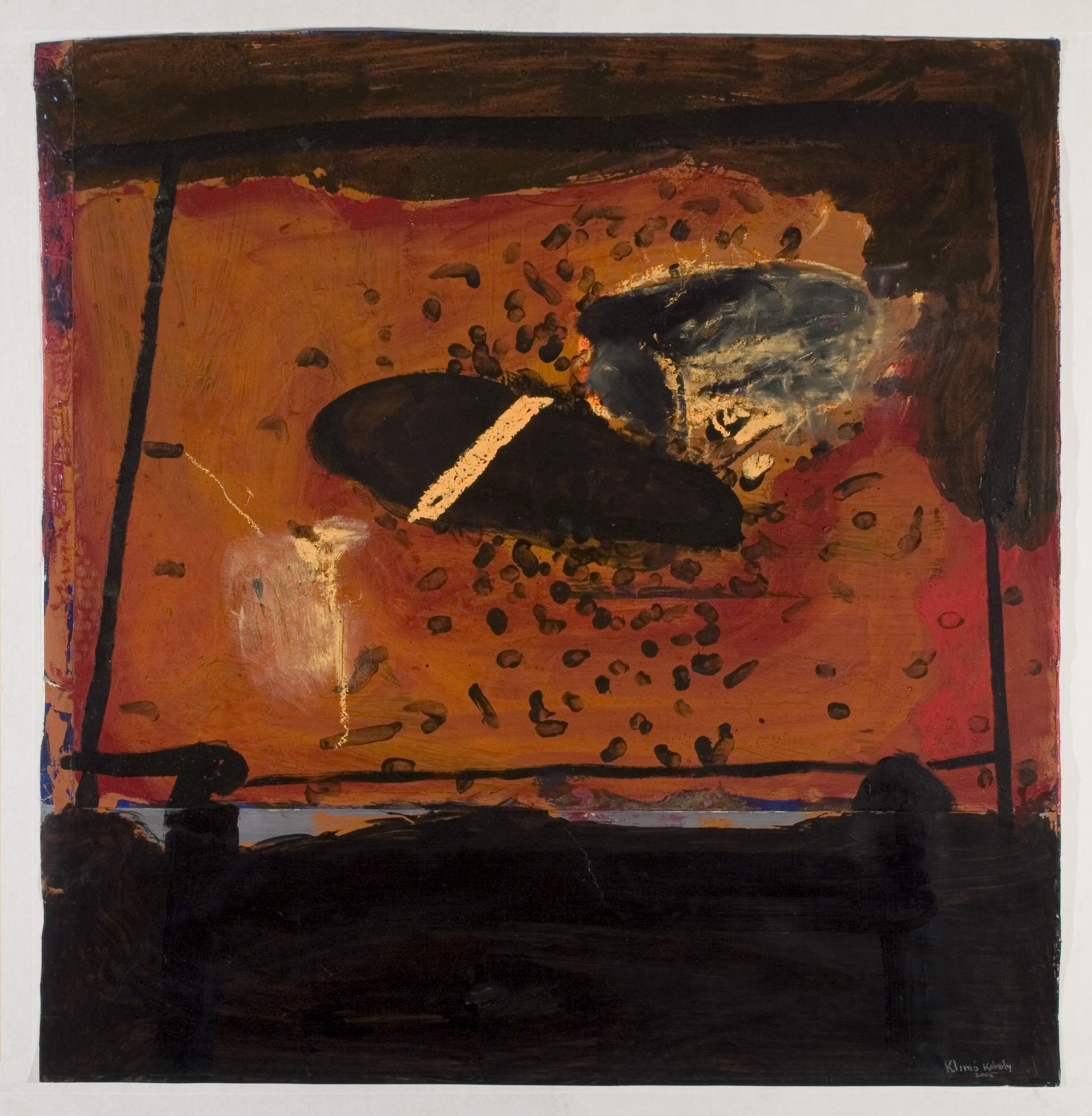
Still Life with bugs (2005)

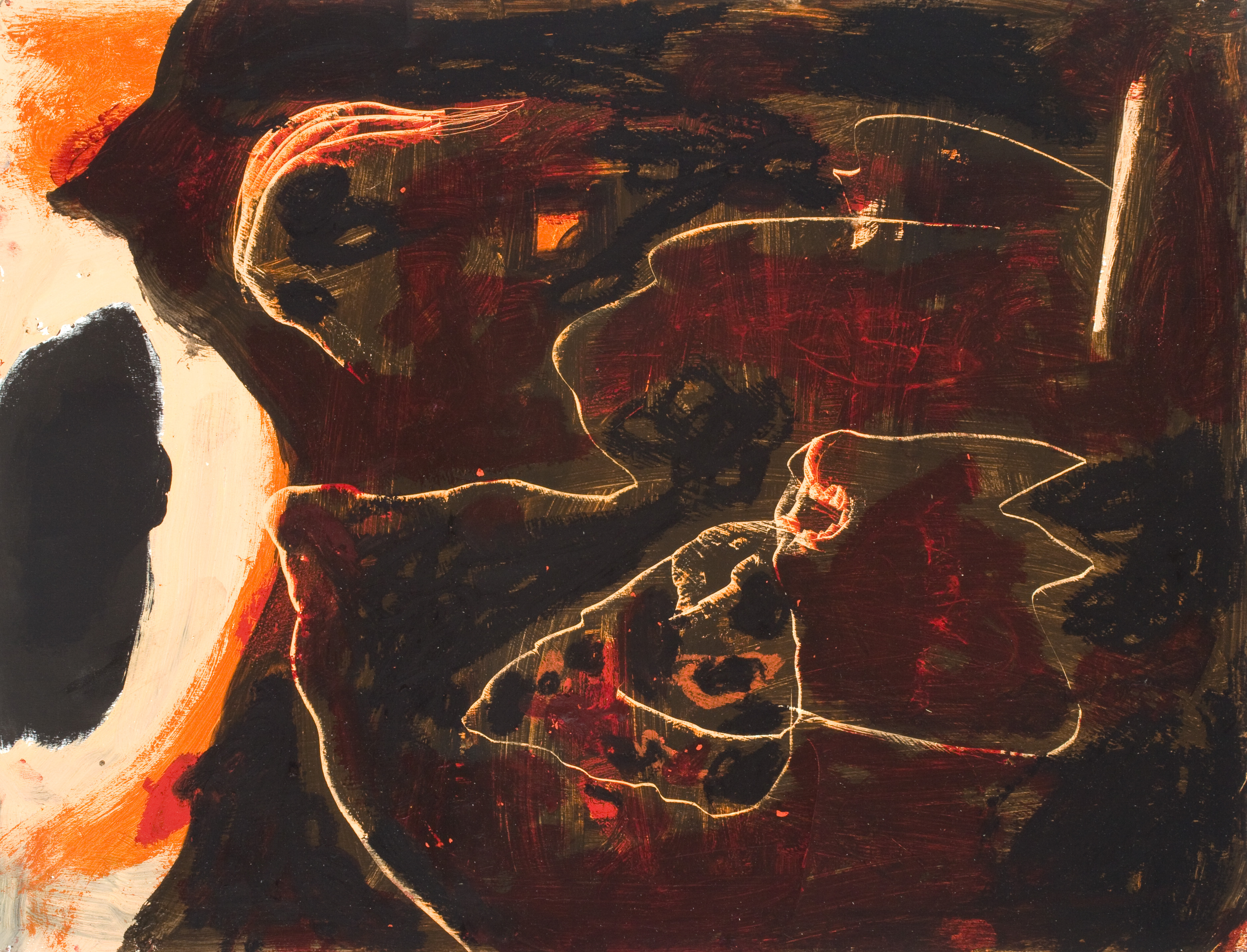
Modern cave drawings (2010)

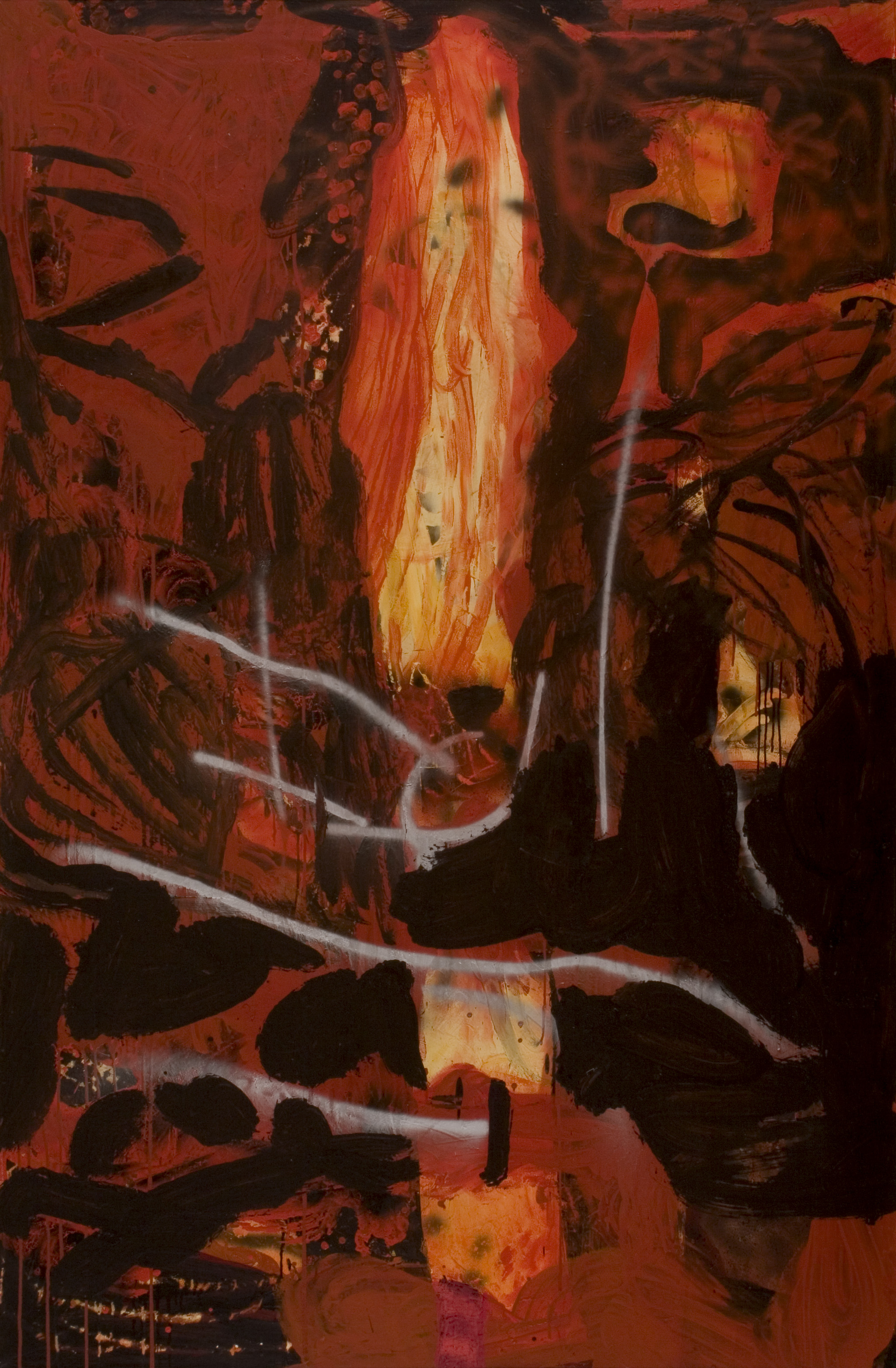
Remote areas (2008)

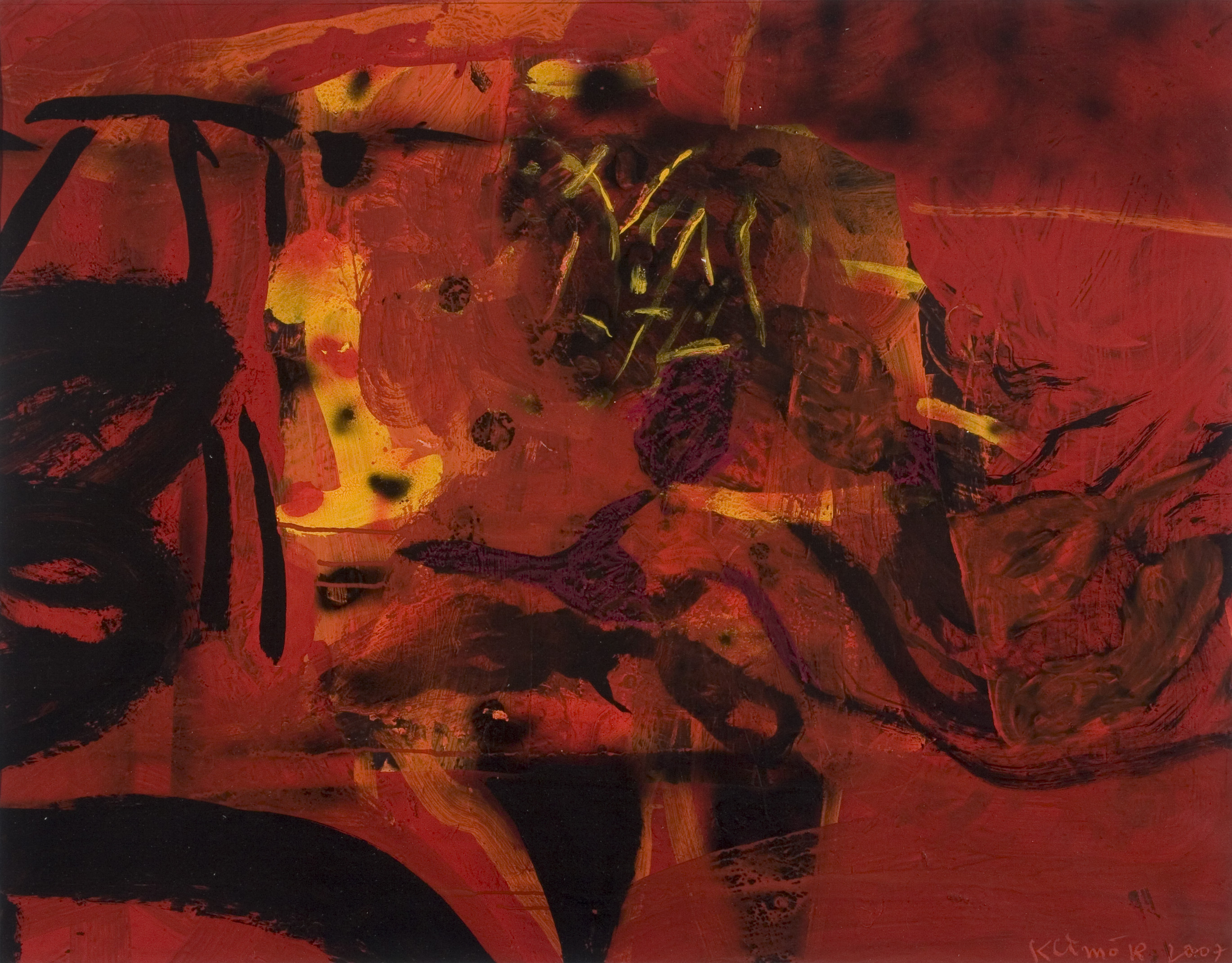
Small flames (2008)

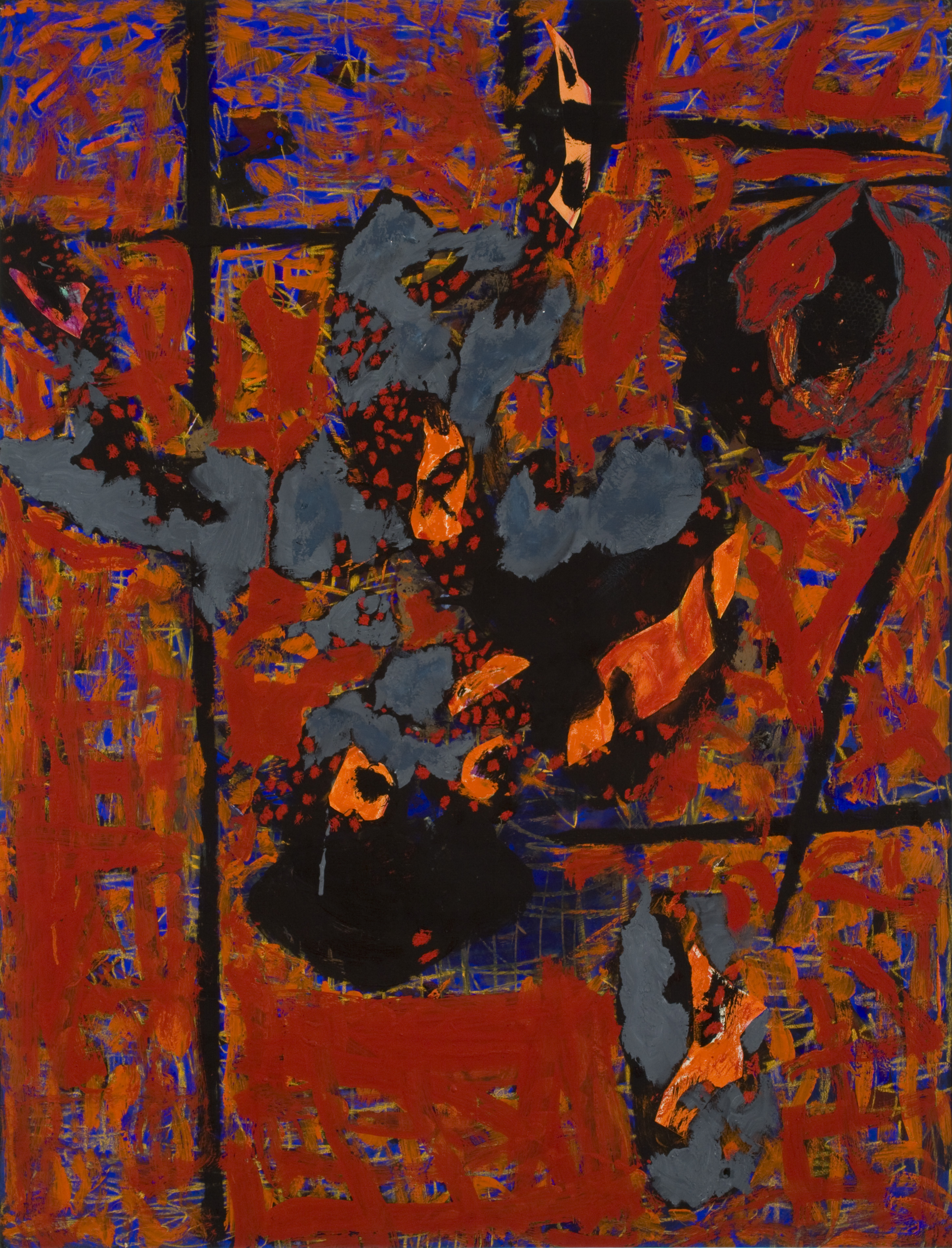
Wildfire

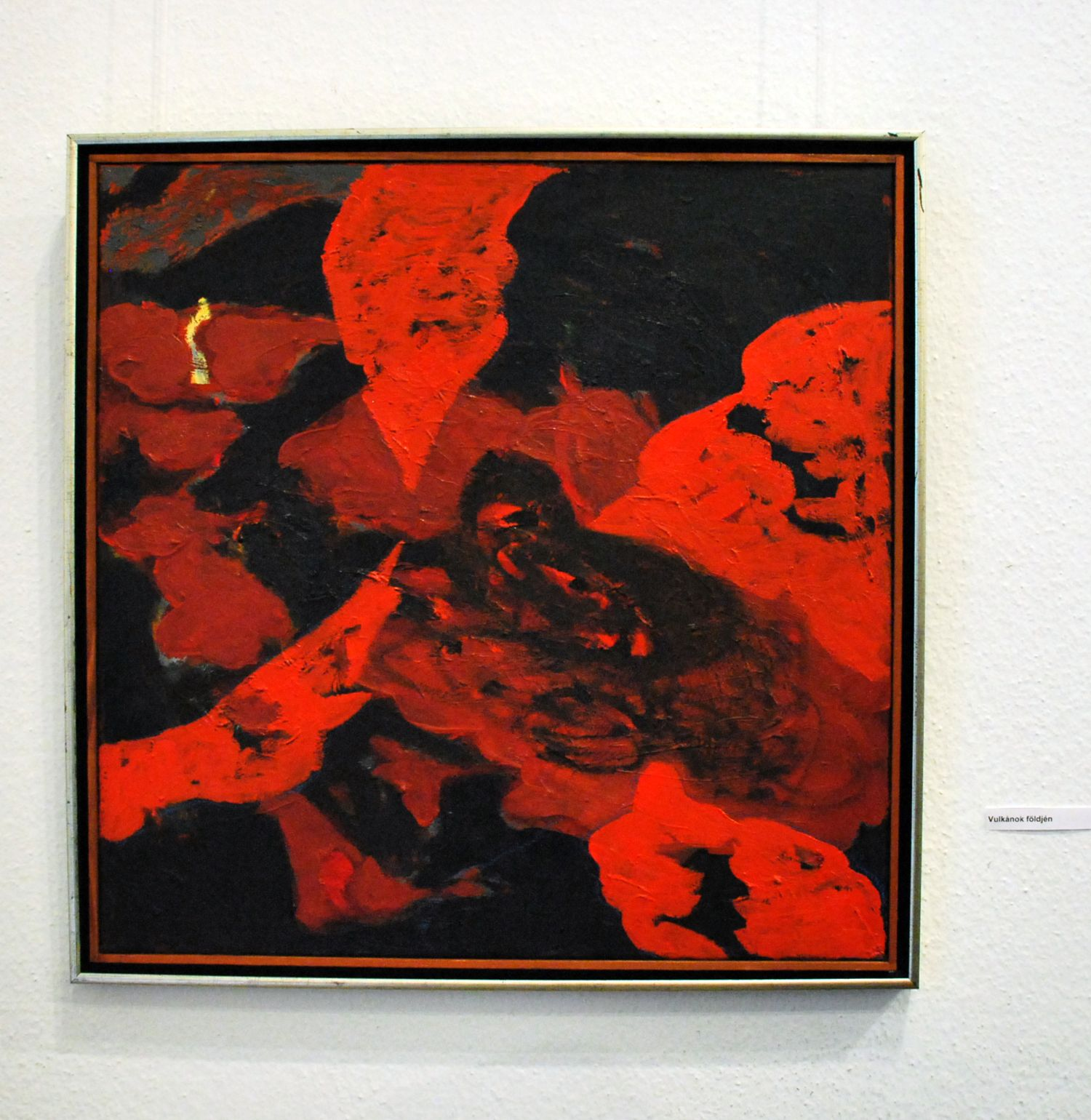
Fires in the landscape (2011)

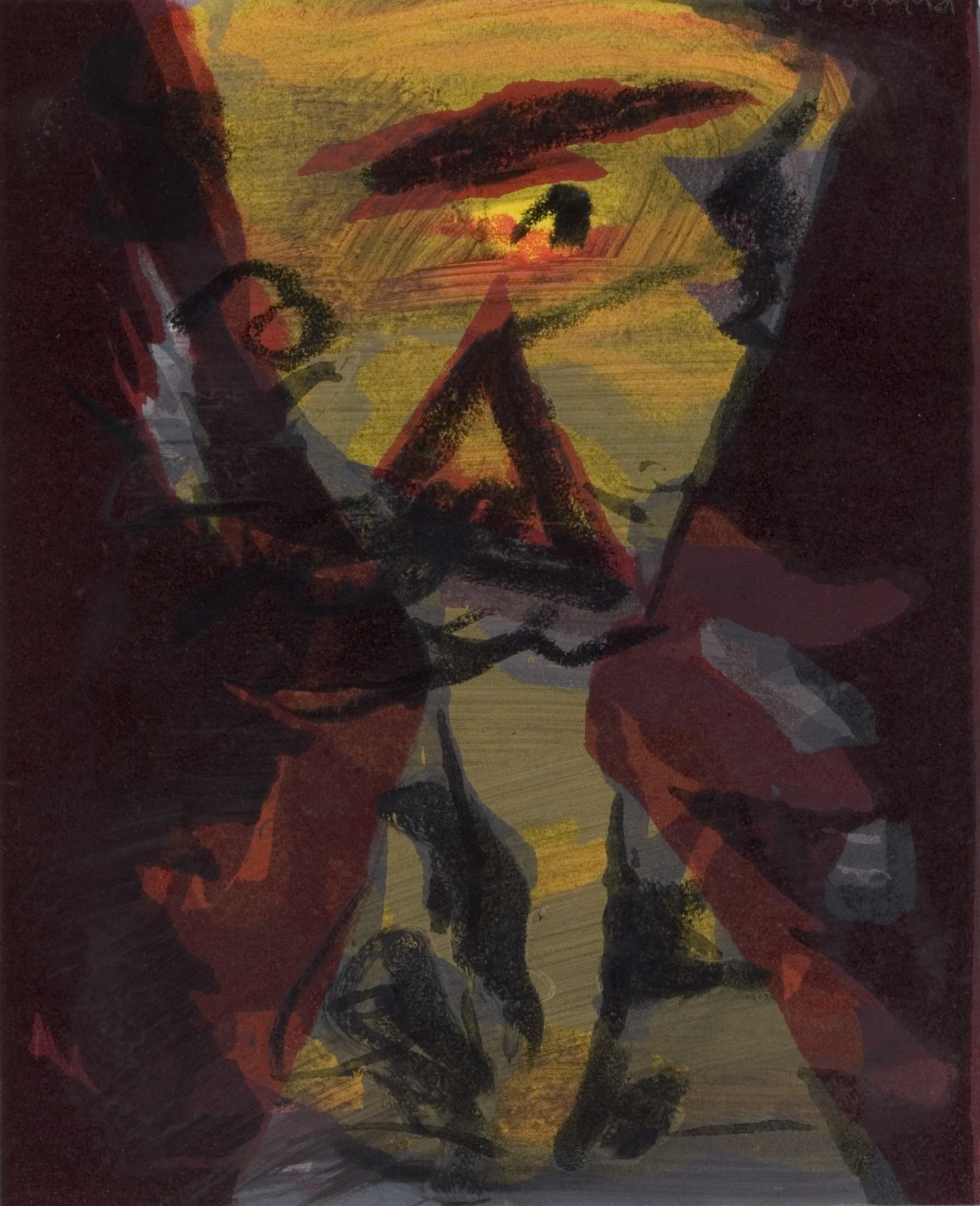
Smoke (2008)

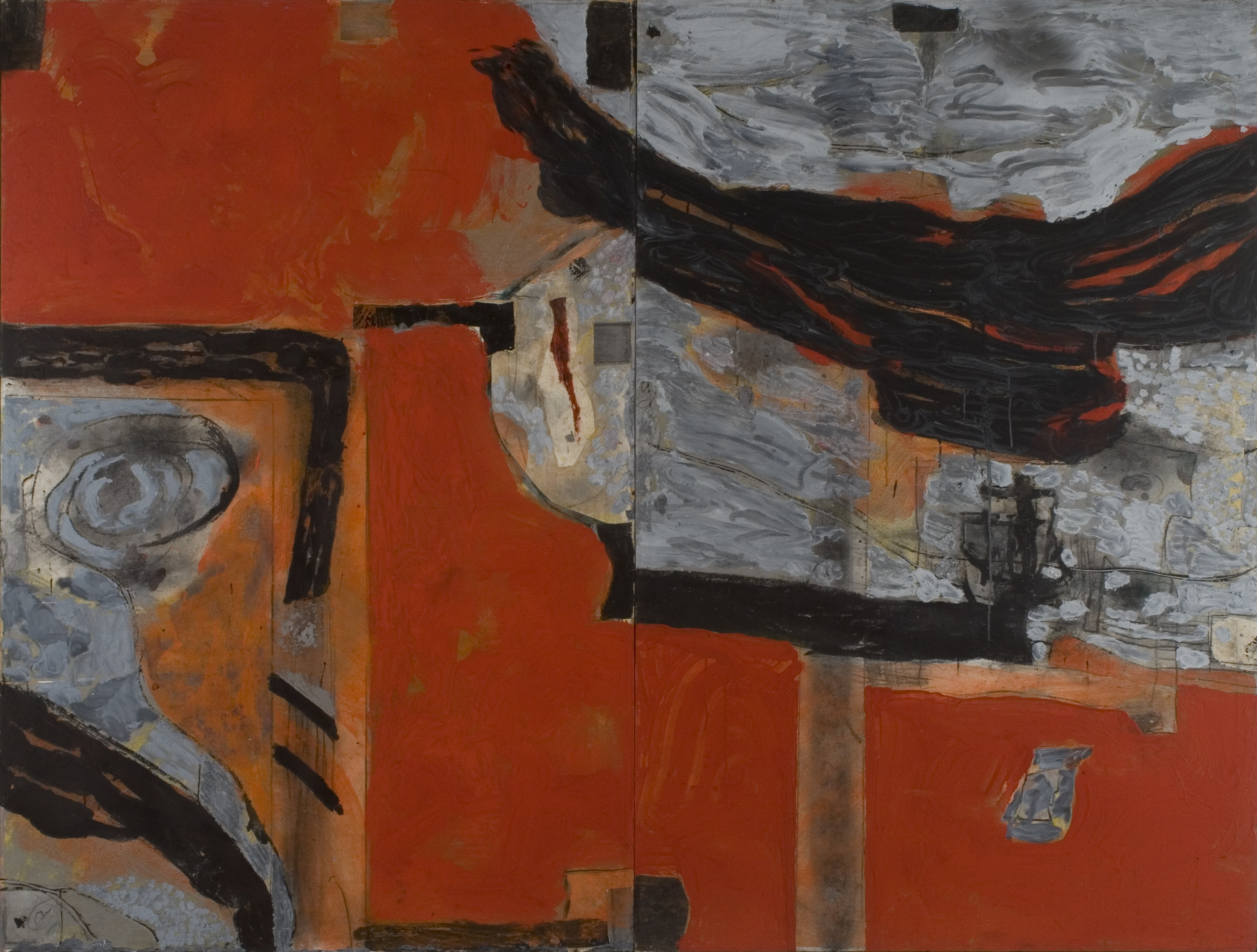
Smog (2009)

== Awards (selection) ==
- Mihály Munkácsy Award (1972)
- Merited Artist (1998)
- Herder Prize (2005)
