= Erzsébet Schaár =

Hungarian sculptor (1905–1975)

- Tibor Vilt and Erzsébet Schaár
- Born: July 29, 1905; Budapest, Hungary
- Died: August 29, 1975 (aged 70); Budapest, Hungary
- Known for: Sculpture
- Spouse: hu:Tibor Vilt

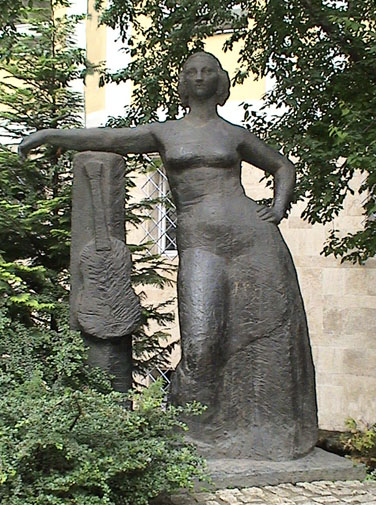
Erzsébet Schaár, statue of Déryné Széppataki Róza, outside the National Theatre of Miskolc

Erzsébet Schaár (29 July 1905, in Budafok – 29 August 1975, in Budapest) was a Hungarian sculptor.

== Life ==
She studied with Zsigmond Kisfaludi Strobl. In 1932, she was awarded the Young Artist Award for the Szinyei Prize. In 1935, she married Tibor Vilt, a sculptor.

Her first solo exhibition was in 1932 in Budapest. In the 40s, she made small wooden reliefs, similar to the Giacometti statues, At the same time, she also patterned several reclining figures. Architectural elements were also employed; since then it has used lightweight styrene, which has created life-size spaces, such as knife-cut, easy-to-saw materials.

In 1970, she had a retrospective exhibition at the Műcsarnok, and two years later she was exhibited in Antwerp and Geneva. In 1977, the Wilhelm Lehmbruck Museum in Düsseldorf held a retrospective.

There are several public statues exhibited in Budapest, Kecskemét, Miskolc, Pécs, Tihany and elsewhere. Much of his estate is in St. Stephen's King Museum in Székesfehérvár.
