= Wayne Siegel =

American classical composer

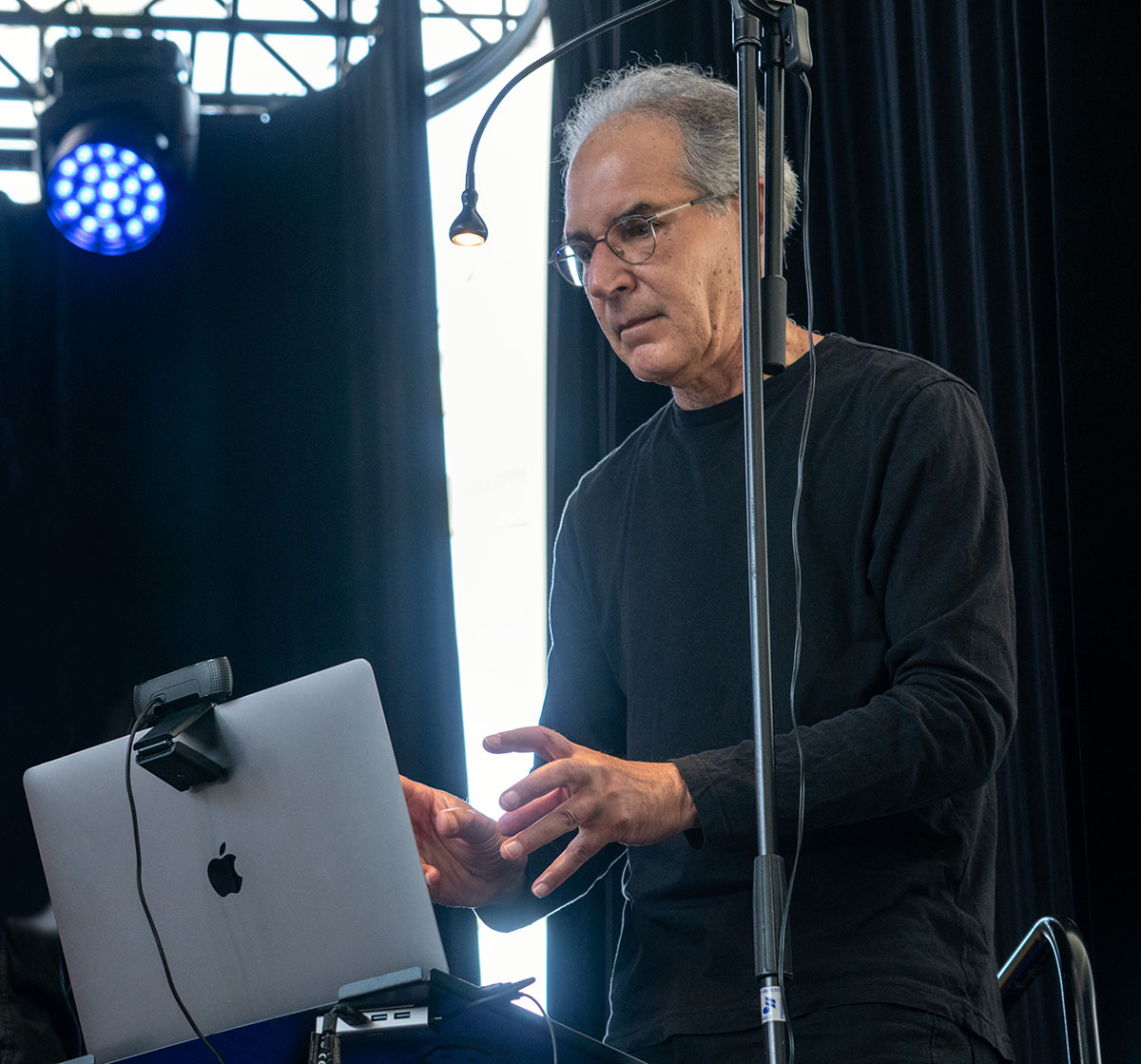
Wayne Siegel

Wayne Siegel (b. Los Angeles, California, 14 February 1953) is an American composer living in Malling, Denmark.

From 1971 to 1974 Siegel studied composition and philosophy at the University of California, Santa Barbara. After three years there he decided to complete his Bachelor of Arts degree in Århus, Denmark, where he studied with the noted Danish composer Per Nørgård. Remaining in Århus, in 1977 he received his degree in composition from the Royal Academy of Music in Århus.

In 1978 Siegel was awarded a three-year grant in composition from the Danish Art Council, working as a free-lance composer in the years that followed. After two years as administrative director of the West Jutland Symphony Orchestra and its affiliated chamber ensemble, the Esbjerg Ensemble, he was in 1986 appointed director of the newly founded national electronic music center, DIEM (The Danish Institute of Electroacoustic Music) in Århus. In 1994 he chaired the 19th International Computer Music Conference (ICMC) in Århus. From 1996 to 1998 he served as chairman of the two music committees of the Danish State Arts Foundation. In 2003 DIEM became part of the Royal Academy of Music in Aarhus, and Siegel was appointed professor of electronic music.

Siegel's works show the influence of minimalism (particularly the pulse-based work of Steve Reich), as well as folk, blues, and rock music.

His works have been commissioned by the Kronos Quartet, Evelyn Glennie, Harry Sparnaay, Singcircle, and the Safri Duo.
