= László Melis =

Hungarian composer and violinist

László Melis (14 August 1953 – 12 February 2018) was a Hungarian composer and violinist.

== Style and career ==
He writes primarily in the minimal style and his compositions are often characterized by a propulsive, bouncy quality. Melis was a founding member of the Hungarian new music group Group 180, which during its existence (1978–1990) performed and recorded five of his compositions.

Melis has composed music for film, winning the Award for Best Music for his work in the animated pieces, A szél ("The Wind") and Gyurmatek ("Clay Play") at the 2nd Kecskemét Animation Film Festival. He composed the score for the award-winning film Son of Saul. He has also worked extensively in theater, creating incidental music for theatrical productions. His compositions have been recorded by the BMC and Hungaroton labels.
