= László Vidovszky =

Hungarian composer and pianist

László Vidovszky (born Békéscsaba, Hungary, 25 February 1944) is a Hungarian composer and pianist. During the 1970s he began composing works in a minimal style. His music has been influential on the music of György Kurtág and other modern composers.

Vidovszky studied composition with Géza Szatmári at the Szeged Conservatory in 1959, and with Ferenc Farkas at the Budapest Academy of Music from 1962 to 1967. In 1970–71, he studied in Paris, attending courses organized by the Groupe des Recherches Musicales as well as composition classes of Olivier Messiaen.

In 1970, Vidovszky co-founded (together with Zoltán Jeney, László Sáry, Péter Eötvös, and Albert Simon) the Budapest New Music Studio and has been an active member ever since, both as composer and as performer.

Vidovszky taught music theory at the Teachers’ Training College of the Budapest Academy of Music from 1972 to 1984. In 1984 he was appointed director of the music department at the University of Pécs in southern Hungary, a position which he held until 1988. In 1996 he was appointed as the first Dean of the recently founded Faculty of Fine and Performing Arts at the same university.

Vidovszky was awarded the Erkel Prize (1983), the Bartók-Pásztory Prize (1992) and the Kossuth Prize (2010). He was named Merited Artist of the Hungarian Republic in 1996.

== Major works ==
- 2011 Reverb – piano and string quartet
- 2007 Páros – vln. and cello
- 2007 ASCH – string sextet
- 2005 The Death in my Viola – viola and chamber ensemble
- 2000 Zwölf Streichquartette – string quartet
- 1997 Black Quartet – covered perc. instruments
- 1995 Ady: Black Piano – disklavier and orchestra
- 1992 Music for the Hungarian Pavilion at Sevilla world Expo with Zoltán Jeney
- 1990 NaNe audio-video games – for Atari ST computer and synth
- 1989 Studies for MIDI piano
- 1989 Twelve Duos – vln. and viola
- 1981 Narcissus and Echo – opera in one act
- 1980 Sound-Colour-Space, with Ilona Keserü – 127 coloured pipes
- 1980 Encounter – tragedy in one act, text by Péter Nádas
- 1975 Schroeder's Death – for piano and 2–3 assistants
- 1975 Hommage à Kurtág – collective work with Péter Eötvös, Zoltán Jeney, Zoltán Kocsis and László Sáry
- 1974 Undisturbed – collective work with Zoltán Jeney and László Sáry
- 1972 Autokoncert – audiovisual work
- 1972 Kettős (Double) – 2 prepared pianos
