= Tamás Waliczky =

Hungarian artist (born 1959)

- Born: 1959 (age 66–67); Budapest, Hungary
- Known for: visual art, animation
- Movement: New Media Art

Tamás Waliczky(born in 1959, in Budapest) is a Hungarian artist and animator, known for his new media art.

== Biography ==
Tamás Waliczky started out by creating cartoon films (1968–1983), whilst working as a painter, illustrator and photographer. He began working with computers in 1983. He was artist-in-residence at the Zentrum für Kunst und Medientechnologie (ZKM) in 1992, and subsequently a member of the Institute's research staff (1993–1997). He later took up a guest professorship at the Hochschule der Bildenden Künste Saar (HBK Saar) in Saarbrücken from 1997 to 2002.

Institute of Advanced Media Arts and Sciences (IAMAS) in Gifu, Japan, chose Waliczky as artist-in-residence for 1998 to 1999.

From 2003 until 2005, he was professor at Institut für Mediengestaltung (IMG), Fachhochschule Mainz. From 2005 to 2010, he was at HBK Saar, this time as a full-time professor. As of 2010, he is a professor at the School of Creative Media at the City University of Hong Kong.

His works have won international awards, including the 1989 Golden Nica at the Prix Ars Electronica in Linz for Gramophone. His work has been shown internationally, including at the Lyon Biennale, the ICC Gallery in Tokyo, and the Multimediale Karlsruhe. His works are held in public collections including the Centre Pompidou in Paris and the Ludwig Museum – Museum of Contemporary Art in Budapest.

Tamas Waliczky has been selected to represent Hungary at the 58th Venice Biennale, in 2019.

== Notable work ==
This is a select list of notable work by Waliczky, in order by date completed.

- Imaginary Cameras (computer graphic series and computer animations), 2016–2019
- Reflections (video installation), 2014
- Micromovements in Snapshots (video installation), 2014
- Wheels (installation with real-time simulation), 2013
- Homes (interactive installation), 2012, 2015
- Adventures of Tom Tomiczky (computer animation), 2011
- Marionettes (computer animation, video installation), 2007
- The fisherman and his wife (computer animation), 2000
- Focus (interactive installation), 1998
- Sculptures (video installation), 1997
- Landscape (computer animation, video installation), 1996
- The way (computer animation, video installation), 1994
- The Forest (computer animation, video installation, interactive installation), 1993
- The Garden, 21st Century Amateur Film (computer animation, video installation), 1992
- Conversation (with Tibor Szemzo, audio-visual performance), 1990
- Memory of Moholy-Nagy (with John Halas, computer animation), 1990
- Is there any room for me here? (computer animation), 1988
- Pictures (computer animation), 1988

== Public collections ==
- Centre Pompidou, Musee National D'Art Moderne, Paris, France
- Museum Ludwig, Budapest, Hungary
- ZKM, Karlsruhe, Deutschland
- Tokyo Photographic Art Museum, Tokyo, Japan
