= Zoltán Jeney =

Hungarian composer (1943–2019)

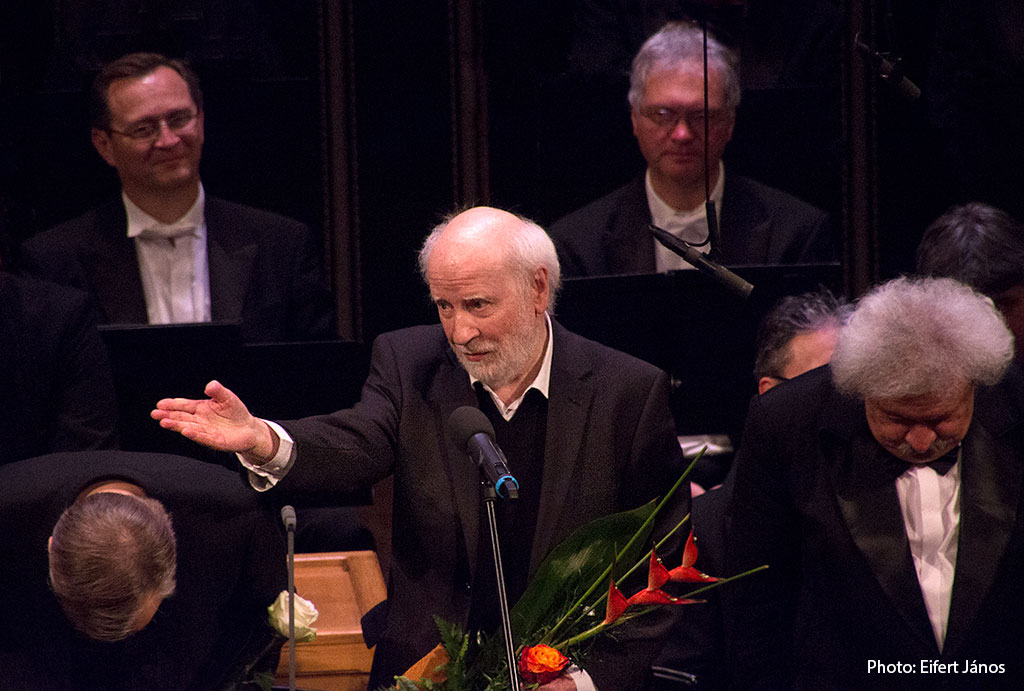
Jeney in 2017

Zoltán Jeney (4 March 1943 – 28 October 2019) was a Hungarian composer.

Jeney was born in Szolnok, Hungary. He first studied piano and attended Zoltán Pongrácz's composition classes at the Debrecen Secondary Music School, later continuing composition studies with Ferenc Farkas at the Liszt Ferenc Academy of Music in Budapest (1961–66), and pursuing postgraduate studies with Goffredo Petrassi at the Accademia Nazionale di Santa Cecilia in Rome (1967–68). In 1970, as part of a group of leading Hungarian composers, he cofounded the Budapest New Music Studio.

Jeney's earliest compositions exhibit the influences of Béla Bartók, Luigi Dallapiccola, Anton Webern, Alban Berg, the new Polish school, György Kurtág, and Zsolt Durkó. In the late 1960s, he began to take an interest in Pierre Boulez's theories, Karlheinz Stockhausen's compositions, and oriental philosophy—a direction intensified as a result of his contact with John Cage's philosophy. In the 1970s Jeney began composing music in the minimal style, and his works are often characterized by an extremely spare and static quality.

From 1986 onwards, Jeney was a professor at the Liszt Ferenc Academy of Music where, since 1995, he served as head of the Department of Composition. He was a research professor at Columbia University in New York, and held a one-year visiting professorship on the music faculty of Northwestern University in Chicago. Several of his compositions have been released on the Hungaroton label.

== See also ==
- Music of Hungary
