= Péter Korniss =

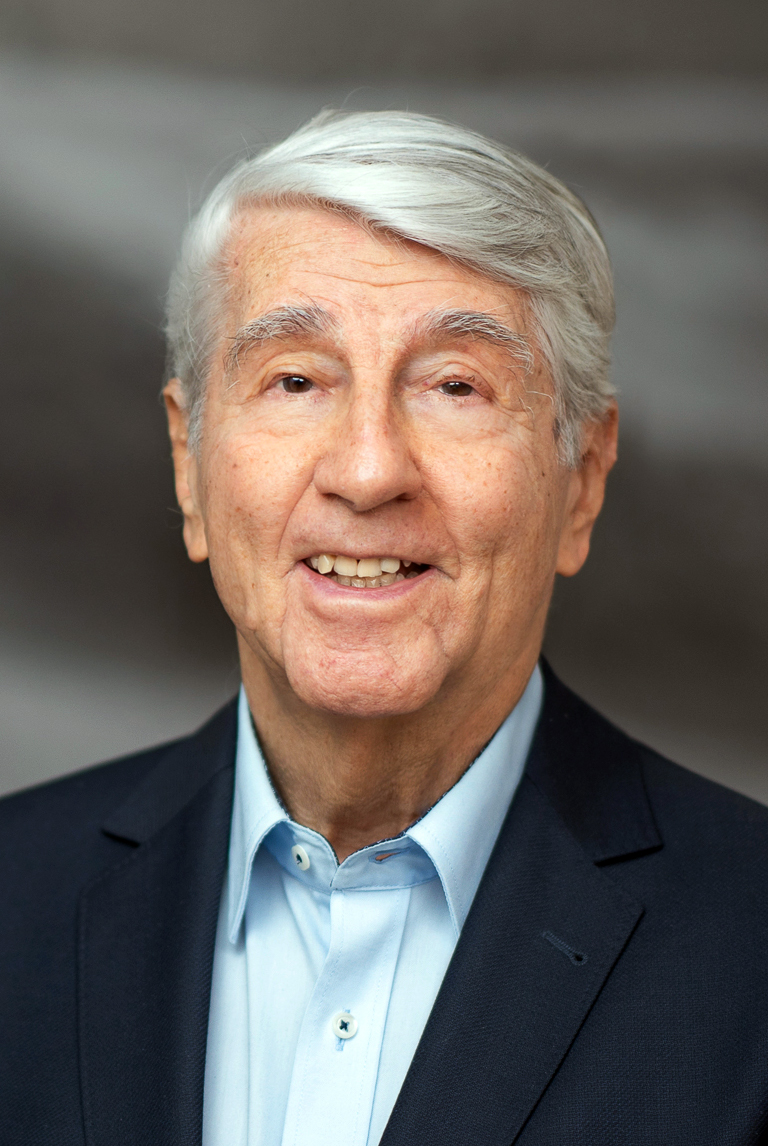
- Korniss in 2023
- Born: August 4, 1937 (age 89); Cluj, Kingdom of Romania
- Occupations: Photographer, photojournalist
- Website: https://korniss.webdesign.hu/en

Péter Korniss (born August 4, 1937) is a Hungarian photographer and photojournalist. For several decades he was working for Nők Lapja (a Hungarian weekly women's magazine) as a photojournalist and photo editor. His documentary work focused on the disappearing peasant life of Transylvania and Hungary. He is also known for his album The Guest Worker, in which he captured the life of a commuting guest worker over a ten years period.

From the 1990s onwards, he began to work with posed portraits as well. In the early stage of his career, he made only black and white photographs, but since the 1990s he has also exhibited colour photographs. He was the first photographer to win the Kossuth Prize in 1999.

== Life ==
Born into an upper-middle-class family, to Pál Korniss and Veronika Czillér, he spent his childhood in Transylvania. His ancestors were factory and department store owners, wholesalers, building contractors and landowners. His family moved to Budapest in 1949 where he attended secondary school and graduated from high school in 1955. He was subsequently admitted to the Faculty of Law and Political Sciences of Eötvös Loránd University. During the Hungarian Revolution of 1956, he was a member of the revolution committee of the university, therefore he was expelled from the institution and worked in various unskilled jobs. From 1958 he worked at the Photographers’ Cooperative of Budapest, and from 1959, after passing the examination in photography, he started to work as a professional photographer. From 1961, he worked at the editorial office of Nők Lapja, initially as an intern, later as a photojournalist, and from 1986 as the magazine's art editor until 1991. Then he continued his career as picture editor at the magazine Színház. Since 1999 he has been a freelance photographer, and also has been teaching at the University of Theatre and Film Arts of Budapest.

He became active in several professional organisations: in 1966 he became a member of the Association of Hungarian Photographers; between 1977 and 1980 he was a member of the jury of World Press Photo, one of the most important press photography exhibitions; and from 1983 he was invited to join its international advisory board. In 1982, he was elected to the advisory board of the Eugene W. Smith Foundation in the United States.

His first exhibition in Hungary opened in 1974 at the Kunsthalle Budapest. He has had solo exhibitions in sixteen countries (e.g. Helsinki, Paris, Prague, Copenhagen, Amsterdam, Munich, Quito, New York) and his photos were published in National Geographic, GEO, in addition to Nők Lapja. He worked for the Déryné Theatre, the Ballet of Pécs, János Bihari Dance Ensemble, the Hungarian State Folk Ensemble, Honvéd Dance Theatre and for many years in Amsterdam for the International Folkloristisch Danstheater. In addition to his work as a photojournalist, he has made several television programmes on photography (Let's take photos! 1965; Telephotograph, 1977; Photography, 1982). In 1999 he was elected a member of the Hungarian Academy of Arts and became its full member after it turned into a public body; later he resigned due to the activities of its president, György Fekete. In 2023, the academy reinstated him as a new (full) member with the title of Artist of the Nation.

== Photography ==
Documentary photography accounts for the most significant part of his œuvre: documenting events realistically. He likes to return to the same location again and again. His works are characterised by their monochrome nature. Until 2010 he exhibited only black and white images. His colour photographs were published in magazines and books.

His work as a photojournalist started with photographing ballet companies and folk dance ensembles, and later continued with alternative theatre performances of the 25th Theatre. In 1961, he met choreographer Ferenc Novák, who first took him to a Transylvanian dance event (táncház) in 1967. It was then that he began to work with traditional peasant culture, and the disappearing peasant world of Transylvania, Moldavia and Hungary became the main motif of his work. He became known for his reportage from these regions, returning several times to the same villages. In the Kádár-era, these works were considered a speciality in Hungary.

In 1978 he began to study the lives of commuter workers travelling from the countryside to Budapest and working in the capital. He met András Skarbit from Tiszaeszlár, who commuted to Budapest and worked there as a road construction worker, and followed him for a decade, until Skarbit's retirement. Korniss published his photographs from this period in the album The Guest Worker in 1988. In the 1990s, Korniss began to work in posed photography, which he had not done before, reviving poses and settings that had long disappeared. His pictures from this period show a combination of tradition and modernity. In 1999, he became the first photographer to be awarded the Kossuth Prize, Hungary's highest art award. In 2008, he published an album titled Attachment, which summarises his 40-year career as a photographer. In 2012, he had an exhibition titled Continuation at Várfok Gallery, and since then the gallery has been representing him in the art world. In 2017, the Hungarian National Gallery in Budapest and Várfok Gallery organised an extensive exhibition of his works, which was followed by exhibitions abroad at venues such as the Museo di Roma in Trastevere, the Museum of Fine Arts in Cluj-Napoca, the National Museum of Art of Romania in Bucharest.

In 2020, Peter Korniss donated his archive encompassing his entire œuvre, to the Museum of Fine Arts in Budapest. The collection, under the name of Péter Korniss Archive, is kept in the Central European Research Institute for Art History, an affiliate of the museum. In 2023, Korniss organized an exhibition titled The Long Road – Sic 1967-2022 at Várfok Gallery, along which a photo album with the same title was published by Bookart Publishing House.

== Publications ==
- Heaven's Bridegroom (1975)
- Passing Times (1979)
- The Land of Red Cloud (1982)
- The Land of Ancient Caravan Roads (1985)
- Amsterdam (1987)
- The Guest Worker (1988)
- Het International Danstheater (1991)
- Hungary – in the Heart of Europe (1996)
- From Clear Mountain Springs – with Ferenc Novák (1997)
- Inventory. Transylvanian Pictures (1998)
- Balaton (2000)
- Jászság – Land and People (2001)
- Bright and Splendid Hungary (2004)
- Whose People are you? (2006)
- Nativity Play (2006)
- Attachment 1967–2008 (2008)
- Clear voices. Music by János Bródy, photographs by Peter Korniss, text by Zoltán Zubornyák (2010)
- „Giving You Golden-Rod” – with Zoltán Kallós (2011)
- Gypsies in a Row - Twenty-four Hungarians of Today - with Pál Závada (2011)
- Continued, Várfok Gallery (2012)
- From Mezőség to Moldva. The Journey of Zoltán Kallós; written by Bálint Ablonczy, photographs by Péter Korniss (2013)
- The World of Zoltán Kallós; written by Bálint Ablonczy, photographs by Péter Korniss (2016)
- Continuing Memories (2017)
- Photographs 1959–2017 (2020)
- The Long Road – Sic 1967–2022 (2023)

== Awards ==
- Béla Balázs Award (1975)
- Grand Prize of the UN Competition (1976)
- Artist of Merit of Hungary (1983)
- National Confederation of Hungarian Trade Unions Prize (1990)
- Csaba von Ferenczy Prize (1994)
- "Pro Hungarian Art" Prize (1995)
- Award for Budapest (1998)
- Berzsenyi Prize (1998)
- Kossuth Prize (1999)
- Joseph Pulitzer Memorial Prize (2004)
- My Homeland Prize (2005)
- Hungarian Heritage Award (2010)
- Kölcsey Memorial Medal (2013)
- Artist of the Nation of Hungary](2014)
- Czech Press Photo Lifetime Achievement Award (2014)
- Prima Primissima Prize (2018)
- Kriterion Wreath (2020)
- Lifetime Achievement Award of the Hungarian Academy of Arts (2022)
- Honorary Citizen of Budapest (2024)
