= Kossuth Prize =

Award in Hungary

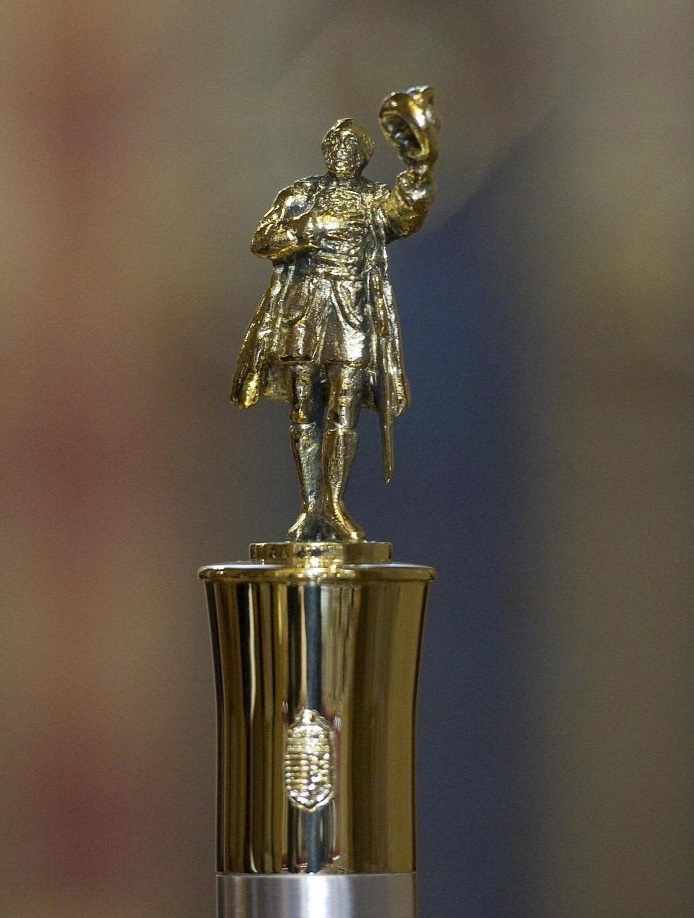
Kossuth Prize after 1990

The Kossuth Award (Hungarian: Kossuth-díj, pronounced [ˈkoʃudːiːj]) is a state-sponsored award in Hungary, named after the Hungarian politician and revolutionist Lajos Kossuth. The Prize was established on 15th March 1948, on the occasion of the centenary of the 1848 revolution, by the Hungarian National Assembly, to acknowledge outstanding personal and group achievements in the fields of science, culture and the arts, as well as (during the Hungarian People's Republic) in the building of socialism in general.

Since 1963, the domain has been restricted to culture and the arts. Today, it is regarded as the most prestigious cultural award in Hungary, and is awarded by the President.

== Recipients ==
Note: This is not a complete listing.

- Aladár Rácz (1948)
- Zoltán Kodály (1948)
- István Csók (1948 and 1952)
- Ferenc Erdei (1948 and 1962)
- Milán Füst (1948)
- Ferenc Medgyessy (1948 and 1957)
- Gizi Bajor (1948)
- Pál Turán (1948 and 1952)
- Géza Zemplén (1948)
- Béla Balázs (1949)
- Jenő Egerváry (1949)
- Annie Fischer (1949, 1955, 1965)
- József Marek (1949)
- Ferenc Mérei (1949)
- Ági Mészáros (1949, 1954)
- Hilda Gobbi (1949)
- Józsi Jenő Tersánszky (1949)
- Sándor Veress (1949)
- Fódor Gábor Bela (1950)
- László Kalmár (1950)
- Kálmán Latabár (1950)
- Péter Veres (1950, 1952)
- Leó Weiner (1950, 1960)
- János Görbe (1951)
- László Heller (1951)
- László Lajtha (1951)
- Rózsa Péter (1951)
- Dezső Winkler (1951)
- Klári Tolnay (1951 and 1952)
- Zoltán Földi (1952)
- Margit Dajka (1952)
- Sándor Jávorka (1952)
- Tibor Szele (1952)
- Éva Szörényi (1952)
- Margit Dajka (1952)
- Miklós Gábor (1953)
- Mária Gyurkovics (1953)
- Hanna Honthy (1953)
- Ferenc Bessenyei (1953 and 1955)
- Andor Ajtay (1954)
- Jenő Barcsay (1954)
- Endre Csatkai (1954)
- Gyula Gózon (1954)
- Péter Kuczka (1954)
- Lajos Bárdos (1955)
- István Eiben (1955)
- Ferenc Ecker (1955)
- Zoltán Fábri (1955)
- Albert Fonó (1956)
- Lajos Hernádi (1956)
- Gyula Kaesz (1956)
- László Ranódy (1956)
- Jenő Ádám (1957)
- Miklós Borsos (1957)
- Manyi Kiss (1957)
- Antal Molnár (1957)
- László Németh (1957)
- Mária Sulyok (1957)
- Zimmermann Ágoston(1957)
- László Fejes Tóth (1957)
- Mór Korach (1958)
- Tátrai Quartet (1958)
- Éva Ruttkai (1960)
- Leo Weiner (1960)
- Iván Berend (1961)
- Antal Hidas (1962)
- Tibor Czibere (1962)
- István Vas (1962, 1985)
- Ákos Császár (1963)
- Dénes Kovács (1963)
- Alexander Radó (1963)
- Robert Ilosfalvy (1965)
- Pál Lukács (1965)
- László Nagy (1966)
- Imre Sinkovits (1966)
- Sándor Szokolay (1966)
- Irén Psota (1966 and 2007)
- Erzsébet Házy (1970)

- Péter Komlós (1970)
- György Kurtág (1973)
- Líviusz Gyulai (1973)
- Miklós Jancsó (1973), (2006)
- Ferenc Sánta (1973)
- Mari Törőcsik (1973, 1999 and 2019)
- Miklós Erdélyi (1975)
- Magda Szabó (1978)
- Iván Darvas (1978)
- Erzsébet Galgóczi (1978)
- Sándor Sára (1978 and 2018)
- Dezső Ránki (1978 and 2008)
- Zoltán Kocsis (1978)
- János Pilinszky (1980)
- Iván Markó (1983)
- László Márkus (1983)
- Géza Ottlik (1985)
- András Szőllősy (1985)
- Dezső Garas (1988)
- Iván Mándy (1988)
- Miklós Szentkuthy (1988)
- Sandor Marai (1989)
- György Cserhalmi (1990)
- Sándor Csoóri (1990)
- Ernő Dohnányi (1990)
- Imre Makovecz (1990)
- Ferenc Farkas (1991)
- István Gaál (1991)
- Sándor Szabó (1991)
- Elemér Ragályi (1991)
- Péter Nádas (1992)
- István Ágh (1992)
- Sándor Kányádi (1993)
- Sándor Reisenbüchler (1993)
- Ferenc Ban (1994)
- György Faludy (1994)
- Tamás Lossonczy (1994)
- Adrienne Jancsó (1995)
- Péter Esterházy (1996)
- József Király (1996)
- György Petri (1996)
- András Schiff (1996)
- Bartók String Quartet (1997)
- Péter Gothár (1997)
- Jenő Jandó (1997)
- Imre Kertész (1997)
- Ferenc Zenthe (1997)
- Éva Marton (1997)
- Géza Hofi (1998)
- Györgyi Szakács (1998)
- Dezső Tandori (1998)
- József Gregor (1999)
- János Kass (1999)
- Márta Sebestyén (1999)
- Károly Eperjes (1999)
- Péter Korniss (1999)
- József Soproni (1999)
- Lívia Gyarmathy (2000)
- Miklós Kocsár (2000)
- Gáspár Nagy (2000)
- Géza Böszörményi (2000)
- János Bródy (2000)
- Enikő Eszenyi (2001)
- Zoltán Jeney (2001)
- Margit Bara (2002)
- Péter Eötvös (2002)
- El Kazovsky (2002)
- Aladár Pege (2002)
- András Bálint (2003)
- Ádám Bodor (2003)
- Éva Janikovszky (2003)

- György Ligeti (2003)
- László Marton (2003)
- Béla Tarr (2003)
- Amadinda Percussion Group (2004)
- Gergely Bogányi (2004)
- Líviusz Gyulai (2004)
- László Krasznahorkai (2004)
- Andrea Rost (2004)
- Gyula Bodrogi (2005)
- Zoltán Kocsis (2005)
- György Szomjas (2005)
- Pál Závada (2005)
- Eszter Csákányi (2006)
- Iván Fischer (2006)
- János Herskó (2006)
- János Kulka (2006)
- György Spiró (2006)
- Erzsébet Szőnyi (2006)
- Zorán Sztevanovity (2006)
- Nelly Vágó (2006)
- László Gálffi (2007)
- Gábor Görgey (2007)
- András Kern (2007)
- Ferenc Kósa (2007)
- András Ligeti (2007)
- Miklós Perényi (2007)
- Ernő Rubik (2007)
- Tibor Szilágyi (2007)
- Ottó Tolnai (2007)
- Judit Elek (2008)
- János Fajó (2008)
- Ádám Fischer (2008)
- Zsuzsa Koncz (2008)
- Péter Kovács (2008)
- Dezső Ránki (2008)
- Mihály Balázs (2009)
- Gábor Máté (2009)
- László Rajk Jr. (2009)
- Pál Sándor (2009)
- Endre Tot (2009)
- Tamás Féner (2010)
- Gyula Maár (2010)
- Ferenc Rados (2010)
- László Vidovszky (2010)
- Agota Kristof (2011)
- István Nemeskürty (2011)
- István Orosz (2011)
- Judit Reigl (2011)
- Ferenc Rofusz (2011)
- György Szabados (2011)
- Ákos Kovács (2012)
- Éva Schubert (2013)
- Zoltán Gera (2013)
- Vera Pap (2013)
- Omega (2013)
- Ferenc Snétberger (2014)
- Kati Kovács (2014)
- Pál Mácsai (2014)
- János Németh (2014)
- Atilla Kiss B. (2014)
- Sándor Tímár (2014)
- Fecó Balázs (2016)
- László Nemes (2016)
- Ildikó Komlósi (2016)
- Géza Röhrig (2016)
- Sylvia Sass (2017)
- László Tahi Tóth (2017)
- Károly Frenreisz (2017)
- Cecília Esztergályos (2018)
- Teri Tordai (2018)
- Feró Nagy (2021)
- Gábor Harsányi (2021)
- Anna Adamis (2023)
