= Aladár Rácz =

Cimbalom player

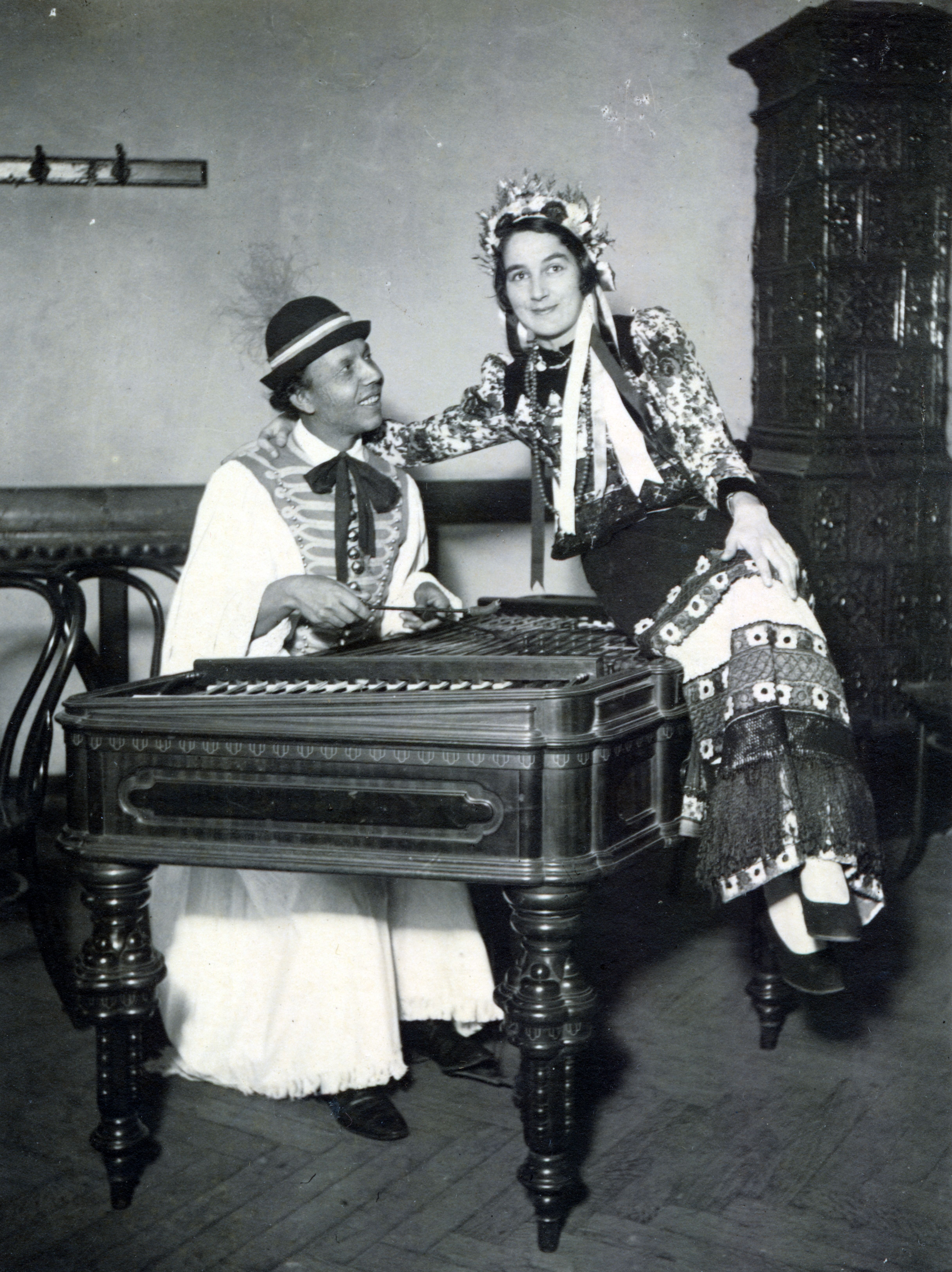
Rácz Aladár, 1931

Aladár Rácz (February 28, 1886 Jászapáti - March 28, 1958 Budapest) was a Hungarian cimbalom player known for adapting Baroque harpsichord and clavecin repertoire for the cimbalom, which is traditionally a Hungarian folk music instrument. He was the winner of the 1948 Kossuth Prize and influenced the composer Igor Stravinsky to incorporate the cimbalom into his compositions.

== Early life ==
Rácz was born into a Roma family; his father played the viola in a local orchestra in Jászapáti, while his mother was a vendor in the local market. He began cimbalom lessons with his father at age 3, and by age 10 he joined the local Hungarian folk music orchestra. Soon after he relocated to Budapest to continue his education on the instrument; apparently much of this early education was done through observation of professional players, since he had no income to pay for lessons.

== Music career ==
From the age of 16 to 24, Rácz apparently supported himself as a working musician in Hungarian folk music ensembles in Budapest. In 1910, following a folk ensemble on a tour, Rácz relocated to Paris and studied French music, language and philosophy, while continuing to support himself by playing his cimbalom in traditional music ensembles. In 1914 when the First World War began he was in Geneva. He stayed there for a time and played in a small café with a string ensemble, which is how he attracted the attention of some notables of the Swiss music world, including Igor Stravinsky, Ernest Ansermet, Jaques Dalcroze and Gustave Doret. His first meeting with Stravinsky at Maxim's Cafe in Geneva has often been described in memoirs and biographies; the composer was said to have run up to the instrument, demanded a solo, and attempted to transcribe what was being played. These figures convinced Rácz to give solo recitals in Geneva, and Stravinsky in particular was very impressed by the possibilities of this folk instrument and incorporated it into some of his future compositions. Among these were the ballet Renard, composed in 1915–16, and the chamber music piece Ragtime, composed in 1918. Other composers incorporated the cimbalom into their compositions in the years to come, such as Zoltán Kodály, who corresponded with Rácz about using the instrument in his opera Háry János (It was only later, in 1934, that Rácz became friends with Béla Bartók and advised him on incorporating the cimbalom correctly into his compositions.)

In 1926 Rácz gave a solo recital in Lausanne which was so successful that he brought it on tour around Europe; first to the Salle de Concert Gavot in Paris and then in Spain, Italy, and beyond. These performances consisted of cimbalom adaptations of Baroque harpsichord and clavecin pieces, as well as Rácz's own arrangements of Hungarian and other folk themes. It was during this time that Rácz met his second wife and future collaborator, Yvonne Barblan. She would accompany his cimbalom playing on the piano for most of the rest of his performances.

In 1938, the Hungarian ambassador in Rome, Baron Frederic Villani, saw Rácz perform there and was impressed enough that he convinced the heads of the Franz Liszt Academy of Music in Budapest to invite Rácz to return to Hungary and become a professor in their institution. However, his novel methods of teaching the cimbalom (apparently based around Bach violin pieces and without any written method) caused conflicts between him the main cimbalom teachers in Budapest as well as Ernő Dohnányi, head of the academy, although he managed to retain his post with the public support of Béla Bartók. Rácz taught at the music academy for the next two decades, until his death in 1958.

== Legacy ==
Rácz had a number of disciples who carried on his unique repertoire and techniques, including Ferenc Gerencsér, Zoth Elek and József Szalai. Gerencsér succeeded Rácz as cimbalom instructor at the academy; one of his students Márta Fábián, may be the most well known cimbalom player to continue playing classical repertoire on the instrument. There is also a music school named after Rácz in Budapest, the Rácz Aladár Zeneiskola.

In 1999 Rácz was posthumously awarded the Hungarian Heritage Award. He was nominated by Viktória Herencsár, a fellow cimbalom player and founder of the World Cimbalom Congress.
