= Gyula Ernyey =

Hungarian interior designer and historian (b. 1941)

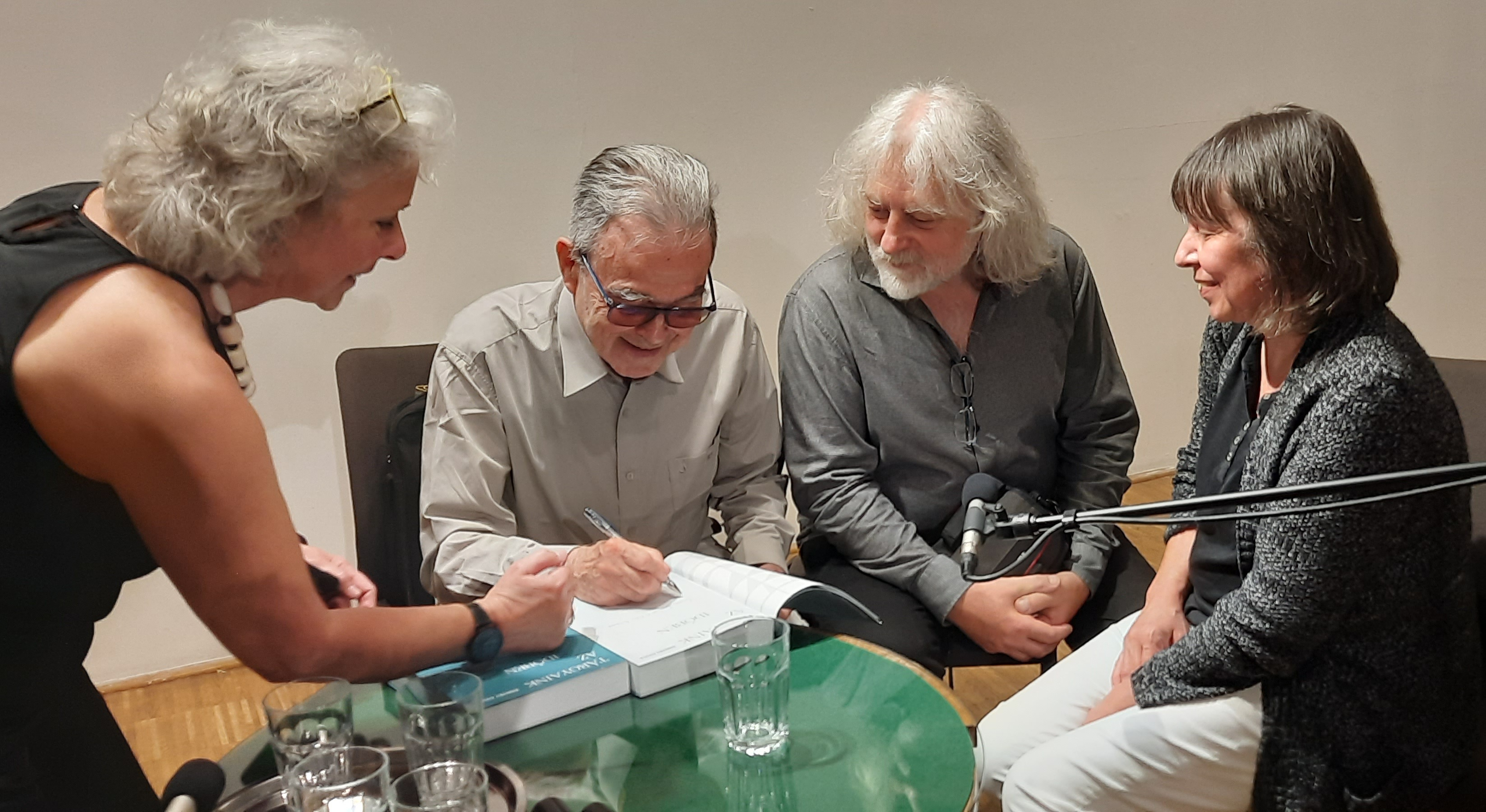
- Ernyey signs copies of his book Our Objects in Time. On the left is art historian Gabriella Balla, on the right are his former students Imre Jarosch and Erika Szóró, 2024
- Born: 19 January 1941 (age 85); Hódmezővásárhely, Hungary
- Occupations: Academic; interior designer; art and design historian
- Title: Doctor of the Hungarian Academy of Sciences
- Awards: Officer of the Hungarian Order of Merit (2011)

Academic background
- Education: Hungarian University of Craft and Design; Budapest University of Technology
- Thesis: Design. Design Theory and Product Design 1750–2010. (Design. Tervezéselmélet és termékformálás 1750–2010)
- Influences: György Szrogh; Frigyes Pogány

Academic work
- Era: 20th-21st centuries
- Discipline: Interior design
- Sub-discipline: Hungarian art history
- Institutions: Moholy-Nagy University of Art and Design (since 1993); Museum of Applied Arts (1975—1988)

Gyula Ernyey (born 19 January 1941) is a Hungarian interior designer and art and design historian. He is recognized as a founding figure in Hungarian design history research. Ernyey is professor emeritus at the Moholy-Nagy University of Art and Design and is an honorary doctor of the Hungarian Academy of Sciences.

== Academic career ==
He graduated in 1965 from the Hungarian University of Craft and Design (Magyar Iparművészeti Főiskola) as a student of architect György Szrogh. His research career was initiated by Professor Frigyes Pogány. In 1973, he completed a Doctorate in Engineering (DSc) at the Institute of Architectural History and Theory at the Budapest University of Technology (Budapesti Műszaki Egyetem Építészettörténeti és Elméleti Intézete), and in 1981 he obtained the Candidate of Art History degree (CSc), and in 2015 he was awarded the honorary title of Doctor of the Hungarian Academy of Sciences.

From 1967, he served as a university lecturer at the Hungarian University of Craft and Design, today's Moholy-Nagy University of Art and Design; initially as an assistant lecturer, then as an adjunct and associate professor, and finally from 1993 as a professor. He has been professor emeritus since 2011.

From 1965 to 1967, he was the industrial design consultant at the Secretariat of the Council of Applied Arts (Iparművészeti Tanács). From 1975 to 1988, he was deputy director general of the Museum of Applied Arts (Iparművészeti Múzeum), from 1988 to 1992, he was scientific advisor to Rubik Studio, and from 1992 to 1993, he was deputy head of department at the National Committee for Technological Development Industrial Design and Ergonomics Council Office (Országos Műszaki Fejlesztési Bizottság Ipari Formatervezési és Ergonómiai Tanács Irodája). From 1993 to 2004, he was the director of the Institute of Theory at the Hungarian University of Craft and Design (Magyar Iparművészeti Egyetem Elméleti Intézet), today the Moholy-Nagy University of Art and Design (MOME). From 2005 to 2011, he led the Program B in Theory of Applied Arts (Iparművészet-elmélet B program) at the Doctoral School of the university, and from 2008 to 2010, he headed the Department of Design and Art History at the Institute of Theory (Elméleti Intézete Design- és Művészettörténeti Tanszék), MOME.

As a designer he contributed to both domestic and international design exhibitions, including: Hungarian Art Nouveau traveling exhibition in the US, 1977–78; Éva Zeisel retrospective at the Museum of Applied Arts, 1988; Made in Hungary 1880–2010 Krakow, Warsaw, Riga, Tallinn, Vilnius, Prague, Timișoara, Bucharest, and Budapest 2010–2011). He is also the creator of series-produced plastic objects for the Miskolc Plastics Industry Company.

His research focuses on general and Hungarian design history and theory, with particular emphasis on the 20th century. His successful defense of the dissertation titled Design. Design Theory and Product Design 1750–2010 (Design. Tervezéselmélet és termékformálás 1750–2010) was the first doctoral defense in the field of design at the Hungarian Academy of Sciences. In addition to his research and teaching activities, he has also contributed to academic administration, professional associations, and the editing of scholarly journals.

== Professional public activities ==
- Member of the Művészeti Alap (Arts Fund) and the Magyar Alkotóművészek Országos Egyesülete (Association of Hungarian Creative Artists) (from 1965–)
- Member of the Magyar Képzőművészek és Iparművészek Szövetsége (Association of Hungarian Fine and Applied Artists) (from 1975–)
- Founding member of the editorial board of the journal Ipari Forma (Design) (1983–1994)
- Member of the Artistic Board of Trustees of the Budapest Fővárosi Tanács (Budapest Capital City Council), later Fővárosi Közgyűlés (Budapest General Assembly) (1984–1993)
- Founding member of the Magyar Mérnökakadémia (Hungarian Academy of Engineering) (from 1990–)
- Board of Trustees deputy president of the Magyar Mérnökakadémia (Hungarian Academy of Engineering) (from 1993–)
- Founding member of the editorial board of the journal Magyar Iparművészet (Hungarian Applied Arts) (1993–2023)
- Member of the Master’s Degree and Art Theory Expert Committee of the Hungarian Accreditation Committee (1993–2001)
- Founding President of the Doctoral Council of the Magyar Iparművészeti Főiskola (Hungarian University of Craft and Design) (1995–2001)
- Founding President of the Habilitation Committee of the Magyar Iparművészeti Főiskola (Hungarian University of Craft and Design) (1995–2001)
- President of the Magyar Képzőművészek és Iparművészek Szövetsége (Association of Hungarian Fine and Applied Artists) (2000–2004)
- Delegate of the International Association of Art, IAA/AIAP (2000–2008)
- Vice-president for Foreign Affairs of the Magyar Képzőművészek és Iparművészek Szövetsége (Association of Hungarian Fine and Applied Artists) (2004–2008)

== Published works ==
- Az ipari forma története Magyarországon. Budapest: Akadémiai Kiadó, 1974. 86 p. (Művészettörténeti füzetek 8.) [History of Design in Hungary]
- Az ipari forma története. Budapest: Corvina Kiadó, 1983. 209. p. [History of Design in Hungary]
- Made in Hungary: the Best of 150 Years in Industrial Design. Budapest: Rubik Innovation Found, 1993. 155. p.
- Tárgyvilágunk, 1896–1996: iparművészet-történeti és -elméleti vázlatok. Budapest; Pécs: Dialóg Campus Kiadó, 1998. 318 p. [Our World of Objects, 1896–1996: Outlines of the History and Theory of Applied Arts]
- (ed.) Britain and Hungary: Contacts in Architecture and Design during the Nineteenth and Twentieth Centuries. Essays and Studies. (Vol. 1) Budapest: Hungarian University of Craft and Design, 1999. 291. p.
- Design: tervezéselmélet és termékformálás, 1750–2000. Budapest; Pécs: Dialóg Campus Kiadó, 2000. 350. p. [Design: Design Theory and Product Design, 1750–2000]
- (ed.) Britain and Hungary: Contacts in Architecture, Design, Art and Theory during the Nineteenth and Twentieth Centuries. Essays and Studies. (Vol. 2.) Budapest: Hungarian University of Craft and Design, 2003. 292. p.
- Made in Hungary 1900–2000. Budapest: Magyar Képzőművészek és Iparművészek Szövetsége, 2005. 80. p.
- (ed.) Britain and Hungary: Contacts in Architecture, Design, Art and Theory during the Nineteenth and Twentieth Centuries. Essays and Studies. Vol. 3. Budapest: Hungarian University of Craft and Design, 2005.
- (ed.) Breuer Marcell: elvek és eredmények: Marcel Breuer: principles and results. Pécs: Pro Pannonia Kiadó, 2008. 174. p. (Pannónia könyvek) (with English summary)
- Muchától Rubikig: Magyarország és Kelet-Közép-Európa 20. századi designtörténetéből: From Mucha to Rubik: highlights in the 20th century history of East-Central European design. Budapest: Ráday Könyvesház, 2010. 503 p. (with English summary)
- Design: tervezéselmélet és termékformálás, 1750–2010. Budapest: Ráday Könyvesház, 2011. 392. p. [Design: Design Theory and Product Design, 1750–2000]
- Bozzay Dezső és pályatársai 1912–1974: Ipari művészet és modernizáció Magyarországon. Budapest: FUGA, 2016. 243. p. [Dezső Bozzay and his fellow professionals, 1912–1974: Industrial art and modernization in Hungary]
- Iparművészet és design: Adalékok és építőelemek az Iparművészeti Múzeum design-gyűjteményéhez. Budapest: Iparművészeti Múzeum, 2022. 300.p. [Applied arts and design: Additions and building blocks for the Design Collection of the Museum of Applied Arts]
- Tárgyaink az időben: Tűnődések tárgykultúránkról, Budapest: MOME, 2023. 496. p. [Our Objects in Time: Reflections on our product culture]

== Awards ==
- Apáczai Csere János-díj (1997)
- Szent-Györgyi Albert-díj (2001)
- Officer of the Hungarian Order of Merit (2011)
- Dózsa-Farkas András-díj (2012)
- Ladislav Sutnar-díj (2013)
