= Ferenc Tóthárpád =

Hungarian poet and andragogist

- Born: 17 February 1958 (age 68); Szombathely, Hungary
- Occupations: Poet, editor, journalist
- Writing career
- Period: 1980s–present
- Genres: poetry, children's literature
- Notable works: Hajszálrepedések (Budapest, 2007)
- Notable awards: Mécs László Prize (2006)
- Website: totharpadferenc.com

Signature
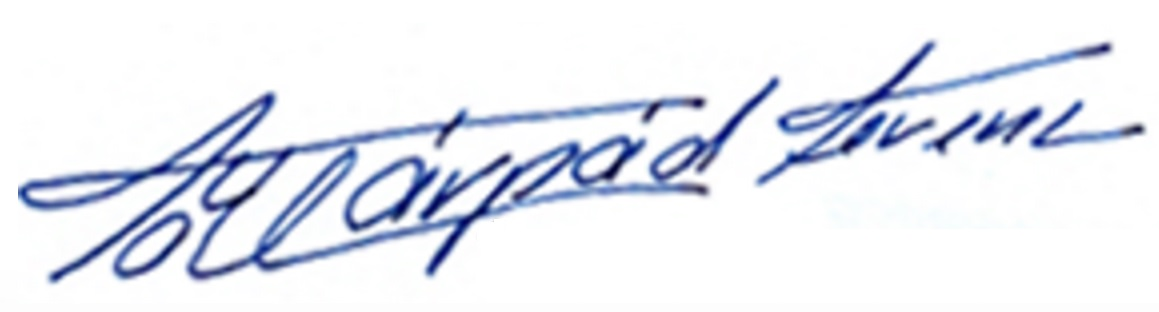

Ferenc Tóthárpád (Ferenc Tóth Árpád, Szombathely, 17 February 1958) is a Hungarian poet, writer, editor, journalist and andragogist, a well-known author of children's literature.

== Studies ==
He attended high school in Szombathely and earned a school-leaving examination certificate as a mechanist (1976) and textile technician (1989). Then he went on to become an auto electrician (1978. He obtained his first degree at Berzsenyi Dániel College specializing in andragogy (2000), and later at the University of Pécs as a cultural and adult education manager (2002, with highest honours). In 2008, he earned a degree in child and youth counselling at the Faculty of Health Sciences at the University of Pécs. In 2010, he passed an administrative competitive examination.

== Literary activities and publications ==
The Hungarian historian of literature, Endre Bakó summarized the characteristics of Tóthárpád's writing with two words: ”Care and modernity”. Ferenc Tóthárpád publishes poetry on a regular basis since the mid-1980s. He prefers classical forms. He puts great emphasis on making available contemporary literature to the Hungarian diaspora. Thus, pieces of his poetry and fiction have been featured in Óperencia Magazin (United States, Colorado), in Amerikai Magyar Napló, Panoráma'’ (New Zealand), Kispajtás, Fürkész and Cinkenapsi (Transylvania), in Jó Pajtás and Mézeskalács'’ (Serbia), and in various reviews published in Hungary (Tappancs, Nők Lapja, Breki Magazin, Mini Manó, Rejtvényiskola. A selection of his poetry written for adults has been featured in Duna-part, Hitel and Partium.

In November 2001, he was invited to Prague to take part in the reunion and discussion of the writers of children's literature of six European nations. He has received several awards in acknowledgement of his literary activities. He doesn't reckon himself among journalists, according to his own terms, he is just a man writing journals. In 2003, he became a contributor and later on a contributing editor of Kőszeg és vidéke. Then he was the founding editor-in-chief of Kőszegi Hírmondó until it ceased publication, becoming the responsible editor of Kőszeg és Vidéke, a position held for 7 years, after which he continued to be a contributor of the monthly review. He is the creator, editor of several ad hoc newspapers (Vadóc, Hétfőiek lapja, iSi-reader)

Among his collections of poetry and edited books we can come across publications related to literature, cultural theory and local history. He is a playwright as well. His play entitled Vadalma (Crabapple) was presented in 2016 by the Petőfi Theatre of Sopron. His poems and other pieces of writing are regularly performed by minstrels, choirs, folk singers and at poetry recitals, they also inspired paintings and works of art.

== Family ==
His parents were Ferenc Tóth (1931–2010) and Ilona Csüri (1938–1998). In 1980, he married Marianna Gréczy (1960). He is the father of two children: Adrienn (1983) and Balázs (1986).

== Other literary and artistic activities ==
In the 1980s, he took part in individual and collective exhibitions with his paintings. Occasionally, he accompanies on the guitar his poems set to music. His poems and pieces of music are featured on CDs and DVDs as well (Concordia-Barátság Choir, Katáng, Csalogató Band).

== Awards and decorations ==
- 2017: Pro Communitate (with the plaquette of Endre András Tornay)
- 2015: Award of the literary competition Meadow-saffron 21st century (bronze plaquette of Sándor Návay)
- 2013: Award for service, cultural division – General assembly of Vas County
- 2006: László Mécs Literary Prize
- 2002: Honours degree – University of Pécs
- 1989: honourable plaque of the Council of Ministers of the Hungarian People's Republic

== Collections of poetry, publications, edited volumes, anthologies ==
=== Major collections of poetry, publications, edited volumes ===
- 36. Flórián katonái - A Kőszegi Önkéntes Tűzoltó Egyesület 150 éves története / 1868 - 2018. The Association of the Volunteer Firemen of Kőszeg, Kőszeg, 2018.
- 35. A végtelen fragmentuma, Szülőföld Kiadó, Szombathely, 2018. (Illusztrated by Ildikó S. Horváth )
- 34. Dőzsöl az égen a Hold, "Családi versek és versdalok". With a CD of Rózsabors Műhely. Szülőföld Kiadó, Szombathely, 2017. (Illustrated by Tibor T. Takács)
- 33. Itt-Hon, Versek Vas megyéből (ed.), Szülőföld Kiadó, Szombathely, 2017. (Illustrated by Lajos Kamper)
- 32. Kíl, a kajla kiscsikó, tale, Szülőföld Kiadó, Szombathely, 2017.
- 31. Mi lehet – Kitalálós könyv, poetry, Trixi könyvek, Budapest, 2016. (Illustrated by Krisztina Kállai Nagy)
- 30. Mikromesék sorozat (Kőszeg/self-published) – I. Az élet kútja (2015); II. Jurisics vére (2015); III. A kincset rejtő Óház (2015)
- 29. Fordul az ég, poetry, Szülőföld Könyvkiadó, Szombathely, 2013.
- 28. Kőszeg 1532, tale in rhyme, Jurisics-vár Művelődési Központ és Várszínház, Kőszeg, 2013.
- 27. Szüretelnek Tücsökfalván, tale in rhyme, Trixi könyvek, Budapest, 2013 (Illustrated by Zoltán Őszi)
- 26. Nyílj, Meseország! poems, Trixi könyvek, Lajos Szilágyi, Budapest, 2013. (Illustrated by Rita Kelemen Czakó)
- 25. Színre visszük a nyarat – A Kőszegi Várszínház első harminc éve, Jurisics-vár Művelődési Központ és Várszínház, Kőszeg, 2012.
- 24. Olimpia Tücsökfalván, poetry. Trixi könyvek, Budapest, 2012. (Illustrated by Zoltán Őszi)
- 23. Bim-bam-busz, poems, ditties, Unicus Műhely, Budapest, 2011. (drawings by Gabriella Diós)
- 22. Cserkész 5. , DVD, Educational film in environmental studies, ReflektorFilm, 2011.
- 21. A Mikulás Tücsökfalván, tale in rhyme, Trixi könyvek, Budapest, 2011. (Illustrated by Zoltán Őszi)
- 20. Húsvéthétfő Tücsökfalván, tale in rhyme, Trixi könyvek, Budapest, 2011. (Illustrated by Zoltán Őszi)
- 19. Éltető mesék, Corvin Kiadó, Deva, Romania, 2010. (Illustrated by Erzsébet Szabó)
- 18. Tücsök Prücsök tüzet ugrik, tale in rhyme, Trixi könyvek, Budapest, 2010. (Illustrated by Zoltán Őszi)
- 17. Tücsök Prücsök, a csónakos, tale in rhyme, Trixi könyvek, Budapest, 2010. (Illustrated by Zoltán Őszi)
- 16. Óarany ének, poetry for children, Városkapu Kiadó, Kőszeg, 2009. (Illustrated by Nárcisz Varga)
- 15. Álomba ringató, poetry for children, Trixi könyvek, Budapest, 2009. (Illustrated by Krisztina Kállai Nagy)
- 14. Szivárványból vánkost, poetry for children in Latin script and in Runes, Budapest, 2008 (Illustrated by Nárcisz Varga)
- 13. Hajszálrepedések, poetry, Unicus Műhely, Budapest, 2007 (Illustrated by Szilvia Pállay-Kovács)
- 12. Történelmi és Művészeti Antológia Plusz (ed.: Tóthárpád Ferenc, bronze plaquette of Endre András Tornay on the cover) Városkapu Kiadó, Kőszeg, 2007.
- 11. Párversek – Anthology of Vas county poets (preface and edition.: Tóthárpád Ferenc, 1–100 numbered copies) Városkapu Kiadó, Kőszeg, 2005. (Cover by Zsolt Kamper using the work of Lajos Kamper)
- 10. Csillagigéző, poetry for children, epilogue by Sándor Sarkady, Kairosz, Budapest, 2005. (Illustrated by Éva Pápai – Bologna Illustrators Exhibition, 2006)
- 9. Kútkávára magot teszek, poems and ditties on birds, Kairosz, Budapest, 2005. (Illustrated by Éva Pápai – Bologna Illustrators Exhibition, 2006)
- 8. Szentjánosbogár – "Szemelvények" Lovassy Andor életéből, (ed.) Kőszeg, 2004 (Cover design by Klára Gy. Lovassy)
- 7. Madárszárnyon, poetry for children on birds, Bíró Family, Budapest, 2003. (Illustrated by Éva Pápai)
- 6. A Kőszegi Kaszinó 170 éve – Adalékok a Kőszegi Kaszinó(k) történetéhez (1832–2003), Kőszegi Várszínházért Alapítvány, Kőszeg, 2003. (Cover design by Péter Trifusz)
- 5. Versus, poetry and short fiction, preface by Katalin Györgypál, Uránusz, Budapest, 2001. (Cover design Péter Trifusz)
- 4. Pilletánc, poetry for children, Bába és Társai, Szeged, 1997, 2006. (Illustrated by Ágota Markovics)
- 3. Történelmi és művészeti antológia – TÉMA III. (ed.) Published on the occasion of the first millennium of the Hungarian kingdom. Kőszegi Várszínházért Alapítvány, Kőszeg, 2000.
- 2. Történelmi és művészeti antológia – TÉMA II. (ed.) Published on the occasion of the 150th anniversary of the Hungarian revolution and war of independence of 1848–1849. Kőszegi Várszínházért Alapítvány, Kőszeg, 1998.
- 1. Történelmi és művészeti antológia – TÉMA I. (ed.) Published on the occasion of the 1100th anniversary of the Hungarian conquest of the Carpathian Basin. Kőszegi Várszínházért Alapítvány, Kőszeg, 1996

=== Major anthologies ===
- 1. Vándor a dallam, OMLIT, 2015.
- 2. Édesanyámnak, Graph-Art, 2014.
- 3. A képzelet világa, Apáczai Kiadó, 2013.
- 4. Magyarok vagyunk Európában, Corvin Kiadó, 2013.
- 5. Peti és barátai, Szent István Társulat, 2013.
- 6. Medvecukor, Novum, 2013.
- 7. Sokunk karácsonya, Napkút Kiadó, 2011.
- 8. Jó kis hely az óvoda, Trixi Könyvek, 2010.
- 9. Farsang az óvodában, Trixi Könyvek, 2010.
- 10. Soproni füzetek (ed.: Sándor Sarkady) Sopron, on an annual basis since 2000.
- 11. Verses húsvéti színező, Trixi Könyvek, 2011.
- 12. Tarkabarka húsvét – Easter colouring book, Corvin Kiadó, 2011.
- 13. Óvodai ünnepek, TKK, 2008.
- 14. Évnyitótól évzáróig, TKK, 2008.
- 15. Álommanók jönnek, TKK, 2008.
- 16. Útnak indult Télapó, Corvin Kiadó, 2009.
- 17. Csillog-villog karácsony, TKK, 2009.
- 18. Télidő, Trixi Könyvek, 2010.
- 19. A tél ajándéka, TTK, 2010.
- 20. Süssünk, süssünk valamit... , Trixi Könyvek, 2010.
- 21. Négy évszak, TKK, 2003.
- 22. Karácsony fényében, Uránusz, 2003.
- 23. Idézetgyűjtemény, TKK, 1999.
