= Györgyi Szakács =

Hungarian costume designer

Györgyi Szakács is a Hungarian costume designer.

== Awards ==
- 1998: Kossuth Prize
- 1986: Jászai Mari Award
