= Miklós Erdélyi =

Hungarian conductor

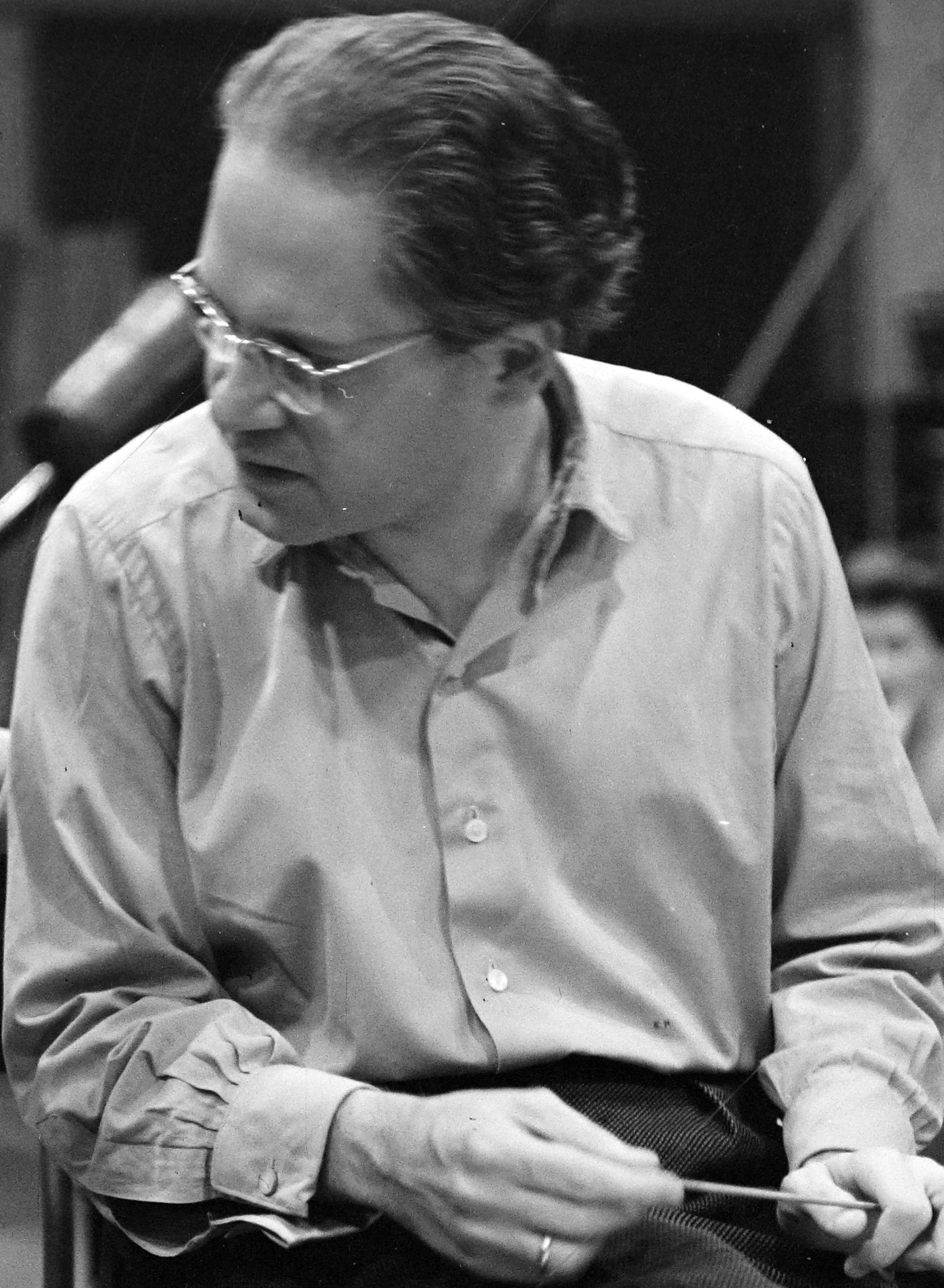
- Born: February 9, 1928; Budapest, Hungary
- Died: September 1, 1993 (aged 65); Budapest, Hungary
- Education: Budapest Franz Liszt Music Academy
- Occupation: Conductor
- Awards: Franz Liszt Prize (1960), Kossuth Prize (1975), Artist of Merit (1967), Outstanding Artist Award (1985)

Miklós Erdélyi (9 February 1928 – 1 September 1993) was a Hungarian conductor.

== Life ==
Miklós Erdélyi was born in Budapest and from 1946–1951 studied at the Budapest Franz Liszt Music Academy with János Ferencsik for conducting, Rezső Kókai for composition and Aladár Zalánfy for organ. He began his career as a conductor in Budapest in 1950–51 as deputy leader of the Hungarian Radio Choir. From 1949 to 1951 he was the Budapest Harmonia Concert Orchestra conductor.

In 1957 Erdélyi was appointed conductor of the state Operaház in Budapest and soon became highly respected as an opera conductor, later becoming manager of the opera, as well. His most outstanding achievement with the opera was performance of Mozart works, but he also worked to improve music presentations and conducted the premieres of some new operas. Works connected to his name include: András Mihály's Together and alone (1967) and György Ránki's The Tragedy of Man (1969). He also directed the Hungarian premiere of Monteverdi's Coronation of Poppea in 1968.

In 1969 Erdélyi recorded Prokofiev's War and Peace for Rome Radio, and from 1977 to 1982 served as a regular guest conductor with the Netherlands Radio Symphony Orchestra. In 1986 he worked with the Tokyo Yomiuri Nippon Symphony Orchestra.

Miklós Erdélyi's work was characterized by meticulous craftsmanship and musical lyricism and his recordings are widely available. He was recognized for professionalism, musicality, music history, and literary awareness, as well as the ability to conduct different styles of music. During the Hungarian period of artistic repression, he was considered an important figure in alternative theatre. In 1960 his work was recognized by the Franz Liszt Prize and in 1975 with the Kossuth Prize. In 1967 he received the Artist of Merit award and in 1985 the Outstanding Artist Award.

== Death ==
He died in Budapest.
