= Ferenc Bán =

Hungarian architect (born 1940)

Ferenc Bán (born 17 September 1940 in Tokaj, Hungary) is a Hungarian architect. Bán is one of the foremost in the progressive design movement and an emblematic figure of eastern Hungarian building. His Tokaj home is an icon of building in the countryside.

== Qualifications ==
- 1959–64 Budapest Technical University Faculty of Architecture
- 1973–75 Master class

== Career highlights ==
- 1966–90: Nyírterv
- 1990- "A" Studio Kft. (Nyíregyháza)
- Hungarian Builder's chapter area president
- Pécs University of Sciences esteemed teacher
- Master teacher at Master class

== Works ==
- MITÁSZ headquarters, Nyíregyháza (1974–78)
- Cultural House, Nyíregyháza (1979–81)
- City Hall, Mátészalka (1980–85)
- Union headquarters, Nyíregyháza (1986–88)
- Mátészalka Theatre (1983–85)
- Záhony baths(1987)
- National Theatre architectural competition first prize(1998)
- His holiday home in Tokaj (2000) Its geomorphic forms have been noted in various overseas publications.
- Campus Hotel, Debrecen (2005)
- Cultural centre, Nyírbátor (2006)

== Prizes ==
- Pro Urbe prize (1984)
- Ybl Miklós prize (1986)
- Kossuth Prize (1994)
- Pro Architectura prize (1997)
- Hungarian Republic Medal (2003)
- Molnár Farkas prize (2004)
- Prima Primissima prize(2004)
