= El Kazovsky =

Russian-born Hungarian painter (1948–2008)

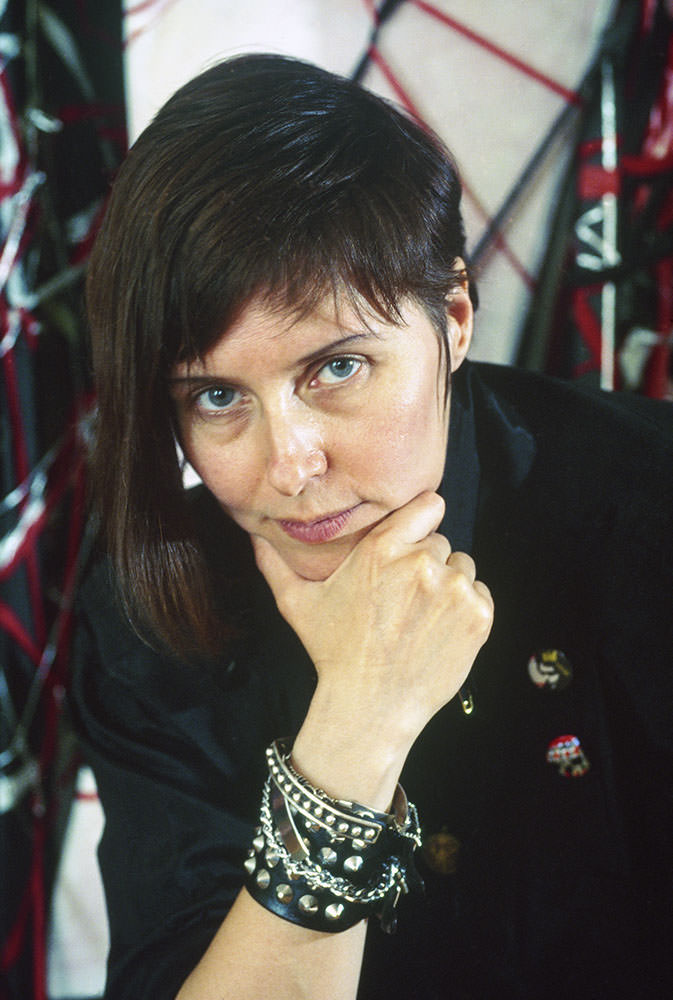
El Kazovsky

El Kazovsky (July 13, 1948 – July 21, 2008) was a Russian-born Hungarian painter, performer, poet and costume designer who was one of the leading Hungarian painters of his time.

== Personal life ==
El Kazovsky was born under the name of Elena Kazovskaya in Leningrad, Russia to Irina Putolova, an art historian, and Yefim Kazovsky, a physicist. He moved to Hungary in 1965, at the age of 15, and graduated in 1977 with a degree in painting from the Hungarian Academy of Fine Arts. El Kazovsky's masters were György Kádár and Ignác Kokas.

El Kazovsky was open about being a transgender man; he was born as a biological female and self-defining as an androphile man.

== Art ==
His art cannot be broken down into periods; all of his expressive paintings reveal the same mythological world that he created. Several recurring figures appear in many of his paintings, such as the long nosed dog or the ballet dancer figure. Besides paintings, his work includes stage designs, performances and installations.

== Awards ==
- Kossuth Award (2002)
- Mihaly Munkacsy Award (1989)
- Gyula Derkovits Scholarship (1980)

== Exhibitions ==
Solo shows:

- El Kazovsky: Encore—Várfok Gallery, Budapest, 2016
- The State Russian Museum—Marble Palace, St. Petersburg, 2005

Group shows:

- Mis-en Abyme (Kép a képben)—Várfok Gallery, Budapest, 2008
- Hungarian Art. Danubiana—Meulensteen Art Museum, Bratislava, 2007
- Re:embrandt—Contemporary Hungarian Artists Respond. Museum of Fine Arts - Budapest, Budapest, 2006
- Common Space—Ernst Museum Budapest, Budapest, 2006
- In Black and White—Graphic Art exhibition. Műcsarnok / Kunsthalle Budapest, 2001
- Millennial serie of exhibitions in the Mucsarnok—Mucsarnok Kunsthalle, Budapest, 2000

== Public collections ==
- Hungarian National Gallery (Magyar Nemzeti Galéria), Budapest, Hungary
- Ludwig Museum - Museum of Contemporary Art, Budapest, Hungary
- Institute of Contemporary Art, Dunaújváros, Hungary
- Muzeum Sztuki w Lodz, Lodz, Poland

== Books, monographies ==
- Forgacs, Eva: El Kazovszkij (monograph, 1996)
- Uhl, Gabriella: El Kazovszkij kegyetlen testszínháza (album, 2008)
