= József Soproni (composer) =

Hungarian composer (1930–2021)

- Born: 4 October 1930; Sopron, Kingdom of Hungary
- Died: 24 April 2021 (aged 90); Sopron, Hungary
- Occupation: Composer

József Soproni (4 October 1930 – 24 April 2021) was a Hungarian composer.

== Biography ==
After graduating from the Széchenyi István Gimnázium, Soproni entered the Franz Liszt Academy of Music in 1949. He graduated in 1956. He taught music theory and composition at Béla Bartók Music High School from 1957 to 1972. In 1992, he was a founding member of the Széchenyi Academy of Literature and Arts.

József Soproni died in Sopron on 24 April 2021 at the age of 90.

== Selected works ==
Stage

- Antigoné, Opera in 3 acts (1987)
- Aranylövés (Golden Shot), Opera in 1 act (2004)

Orchestral

- Divertimento for string orchestra (1951–1952)
- Concerto for string orchestra (1953)
- Symphony (Szimfónia) for string orchestra, brass and percussion (1961)
- Eklypsis for symphony orchestra (1969)
- Symphony No. 1 for orchestra (1975, revised 1980)
- Symphony No. 2 Seasons (Évszakok) for orchestra (1977)
- Symphony No. 3 Sinfonia de Requiem for soloists, mixed choir and orchestra (1979–1980)
- Comments on a Theme by Händel (Kommentárok egy Händel-témához) for orchestra (1985)
- 3 Pieces (Három darab) for orchestra (1988)
- Symphony No. 4 Találkozások Philipp Emanuel B.-vel (Encounters with Philipp Emanuel B.) for orchestra (1994)
- Symphony No. 5 for soprano and orchestra (1995); words by Rainer Maria Rilke
- 4 Short Movements (Négy kis tétel) for string orchestra (1995)
- Symphony No. 7 for orchestra (1999; withdrawn)
- Comments on a Theme by Haydn (Kommentárok egy Haydn-témához) for orchestra (2003)
- Symphony No. 6 for orchestra (2007)
- Symphony for orchestra (2011); uses material from the discarded Symphony No. 7

Concertante

- Concerto (Brácsaverseny) for viola and orchestra (1959)
- Concerto No. 1 In memoriam matris carissimae meae for cello and orchestra (1967)
- Chamber Concerto No. 1 for 12 instruments (1972)
- Concerto (Hegedűverseny) for violin and orchestra (1982–1983)
- Concerto No. 2 (Gordonkaverseny) for cello and orchestra (1984)
- Concerto No. 1 (Zongoraverseny) for piano and orchestra (1997)
- Chamber Concerto No. 2 for 12 instruments (1998)
- Concerto No. 2 (Zongoraverseny) for piano and orchestra (2000)
- Concerto (Oboaverseny) for oboe and string orchestra (2001)
- Concerto No. 3 (Zongoraverseny) for piano and orchestra (2001)

Chamber music

- String Quartet No. 1 (1957–1958)
- Sonatina for viola and piano (1958)
- String Quartet No. 2 (1960)
- Musica da Camera No. 1 for violin, cello and piano (1963)
- String Quartet No. 3 (1965)
- String Quartet No. 4 (1971)
- Sonata for flute and piano (1971)
- Musica da Camera No. 2 "Capricorn Music" for clarinet, violin, cello and piano (1976)
- Tre pezzi (3 Pieces) for flute and cimbalom (1976)
- Sonata for horn and piano (1976)
- 6 Bagatelles (Hat bagatell) for brass quintet (1977)
- Monologue (Monológ) for clarinet solo (1977)
- Late Summer Caprices (Nyárvégi capricciók) for violin, viola, cello and piano (1978)
- 4 Pieces (Négy darab) for saxophone and piano (1978)
- Sonata No. 1 for violin and piano (1979)
- Episodi ritornanti (Visszatérő epizódok) for 2 cimbaloms (1979)
- Sonata No. 2 for violin and piano (1980)
- Rapszódia (Rhapsody) for viola and piano (1984)
- String Quartet No. 5 (1988)
- Piano Quintet No. 1 (1990)
- String Quartet No. 6 Uxori meae (1993)
- String Quartet No. 7 (1993)
- String Quartet No. 8 (1994)
- String Quartet No. 9 (1994)
- String Quartet No. 10 (1994)
- String Quartet No. 11 (1999)
- String Quartet No. 12 (1999)
- Sonata for cello and piano (2008)
- Piano Quintet No. 2 (2009)
- Sonata No. 3 for violin and piano (2010)
- Piano Trio (2010); transcription of the Sonata No. 3 for violin and piano
- Sonata No. 4 for violin and piano (2010)
- Movement for Piano Trio (Zongoratrió-tétel) (2010)
- Sonata No. 5 for violin and piano (2011)
- Sonata No. 6 for violin and piano (2011)
- String Quartet No. 16 (2016)

Keyboard

- 30 Inventions (Harminc invenció) for piano (1951–1952)
- 4 Bagatelles (Négy bagatell) for piano (1957)
- Partita for harpsichord (1957)
- Meditazione con toccata for organ (1959)
- 7 Piano Pieces (Hét zongoradarab) (1962)
- 5 Little Pieces (Öt kis négykezes zongoradarab) for piano 4-hands (1971)
- Invenzioni sul BACH for piano (1971)
- Incrustations for piano (1973)
- Album Leaves I (Jegyzetlapok I) for piano (1974)
- Album Leaves II (Jegyzetlapok II) for piano (1975)
- 4 Intermezzo for piano (1976)
- Album Leaves III (Jegyzetlapok III) for piano (1977)
- Album Leaves IV (Jegyzetlapok IV) for piano (1978)
- Piano Sonata No. 1 (1996)
- Piano Sonata No. 2 (1996)
- Piano Sonata No. 3 (1996)
- Piano Sonata No. 4 (1997)
- Piano Sonata No. 5 (1997)
- Piano Sonata No. 6 (1997)
- Piano Sonata No. 7 (1997)
- Piano Sonata No. 8 (1998)
- Piano Sonata No. 9 (1998)
- Piano Sonata No. 10 (1998)
- Piano Sonata No. 11 (1998)
- Piano Sonata No. 12 (1999)
- Piano Sonata No. 13 (2000)
- Piano Sonata No. 14 (2001)
- Piano Sonata No. 15 (2002)
- Piano Sonata No. 16 (2002)
- Piano Sonata No. 17 (2003)
- Piano Sonata No. 18 (2003)
- Piano Sonata No. 19 (2004)
- Piano Sonata No. 20 (2004)
- Livre d'orgue, 10 Pieces for organ (1994)
- Piano Sonata No. 21 (2017)
- 12 Pieces (Tizenkét négykezes zongoradarab) for piano 4-hands (2017)
- Piano Sonata No. 22 (2018)
- Emléklapok, 22 Pieces for piano (2018–2020)

== Awards ==
- Ferenc Erkel Prize (1974)
- Meritorius Artist of Hungary (1981)
- Béla Bartók - Ditta Pásztory Award (1987, 2002)
- Great Artist of Hungary Award (1990)
- Kossuth Prize (1999)
- Artisjus Award (2008)
- National Artist Award (2020)
