= Judit Szántó =

Hungarian performance artist

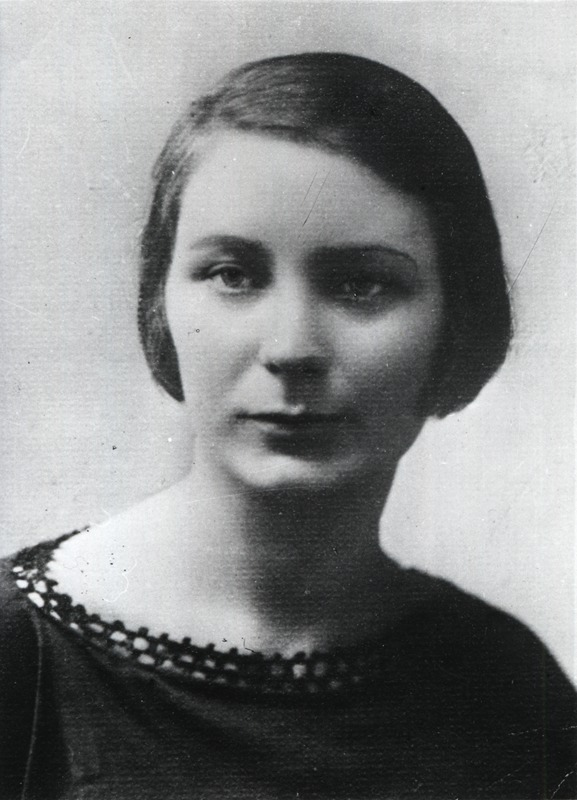
Judit Szántó, circa 1930

Judit Szántó (1903–1963) was a Hungarian performance artist, poet and museologist. She was married to the poet Antal Hidas between 1921 and 1925 (they had one child, Éva Szántó), and dated the poet Attila József between 1929 and 1935.
