= Istvan Banyai =

Hungarian illustrator and animator

Istvan Banyai (27 February 1949 – 15 December 2022) was a Hungarian illustrator and animator.

== Biography ==
He was born in suburban Budapest and received his BFA from Moholy-Nagy University of Art and Design. He moved to France in 1973, then to the United States in 1981.

In 1995, Banyai produced his first wordless children's book, Zoom. Honored as one of the best children's books of the year by The New York Times and Publishers Weekly, Zoom was soon published in 18 languages. He went on to author four more books and illustrate many more in collaboration with other writers and poets. "It's refreshing to encounter a group of virtually wordless books that invite children to consider their world from a point of view they may not have otherwise considered. The most stunning is Zoom, written—or, rather, imagined and then illustrated—by Istvan Banyai."

Banyai also produced illustrations for The New Yorker, Playboy, Rolling Stone, Time and The Atlantic Monthly; cover art for Sony and Verve Records; and animated short films for Nickelodeon and MTV Europe. He described his art as "an organic combination of turn-of-the-century Viennese retro, interjected with American pop, some European absurdity added for flavor, served on a cartoon-style color palette... no social realism added."

Having moved from Budapest to live in Paris, Los Angeles, and New York, Banyai later lived in rural Connecticut. He and his wife, Kati, had a son.

Banyai died from lung cancer at a hospital in West Harrison, New York, on 15 December 2022, at the age of 73.

== Books ==
- Zoom (New York: Viking, 1995)
- Re-Zoom (New York: Penguin Group, 1998)
- REM: Rapid Eye Movement (New York: Viking, 1998)
- Delzell, Tom. The Slang of Sin (Merriam Webster, 1998)
- Sandburg, Carl. Poems for Children: Nowhere near Old Enough to Vote (Random House, 1999)
- Minus Equals Plus introduction by Kurt Andersen (New York: Abrams, 2001)
- The Other Side (Chronicle Books, 2005)
- Wiedemann, Julius, ed.Illustration Now! (Köln: Taschen, 2005)
- Park, Linda Sue. Tap Dancing on the Roof (Clarion Books, 2007

== Awards ==
- Ten Best Books of the Year, New York Times Book Review,1995
- International Reading Association (IRA) Children's Choices Award,1997
- Publishers's Weekly, Best Books, 1995
- American Illustration Cover, No18, November 1999
- "Professor Emeritus", Moholy Nagy Academy of Art, Budapest, 2005
- The Society of illustrators, Best illustrated childrenbook, "The Other Side", Gold Medal, 2007
- 3x3, magazine of contemporary illustration, Silver Medal, 2008
- Notable Children’s Books, Committee of the Association for Library Service to Children.

== Articles ==
- Mark Vallen, "Illustrating War," Foreign Policy in Focus, 18 March 2009
- Patricia McCormick, "All Things Considered" 12 November 1995, The New York Times
- Sean Kelly, "Spring Children's Books: Stuff and Nonsense" 16 May 1999, The New York Times
- School Library Journal
- Step Inside Design
- "Hungary: an open book"

== Exhibitions ==
- "Stranger in a Strange Land", Retrospective solo exhibition in the Norman Rockwell Museum, Massachusetts, 2013.
- "Artists Against The War," Society of Illustrators, New York, January 2008
- "Illuminare" Design Week Budapest. Hungary, 2005
- Wordless book Festival, Kyoto, Japan, 2005
- “America Illustrated” or the Best Contemporary American Illustrators, Teatrio association together with the Italian Foreign Affairs Department and the Embassy of the United States of America. Catalogue Cover Art, Published by Associazione Culturale Teatrio. Italy, 2000
- Eastern European illustrators for The New York Times "Op-Ed". SVA, New York, 1998
