= Sándor Tímár =

Hungarian choreographer and dancer (1930–2026)

- Born: 2 October 1930; Szolnok, Hungary
- Died: 19 June 2026 (aged 95)
- Education: University of Theatre and Film Arts in Budapest
- Occupations: Choreographer, dancer

Sándor Tímár (2 October 1930 – 19 June 2026) was a Hungarian choreographer and dancer. A member of the Hungarian Academy of Arts, he was a recipient of the Kossuth Prize (2014).

Tímár died on 19 June 2026, at the age of 95.
