= Tamás Lossonczy =

Hungarian abstract painter

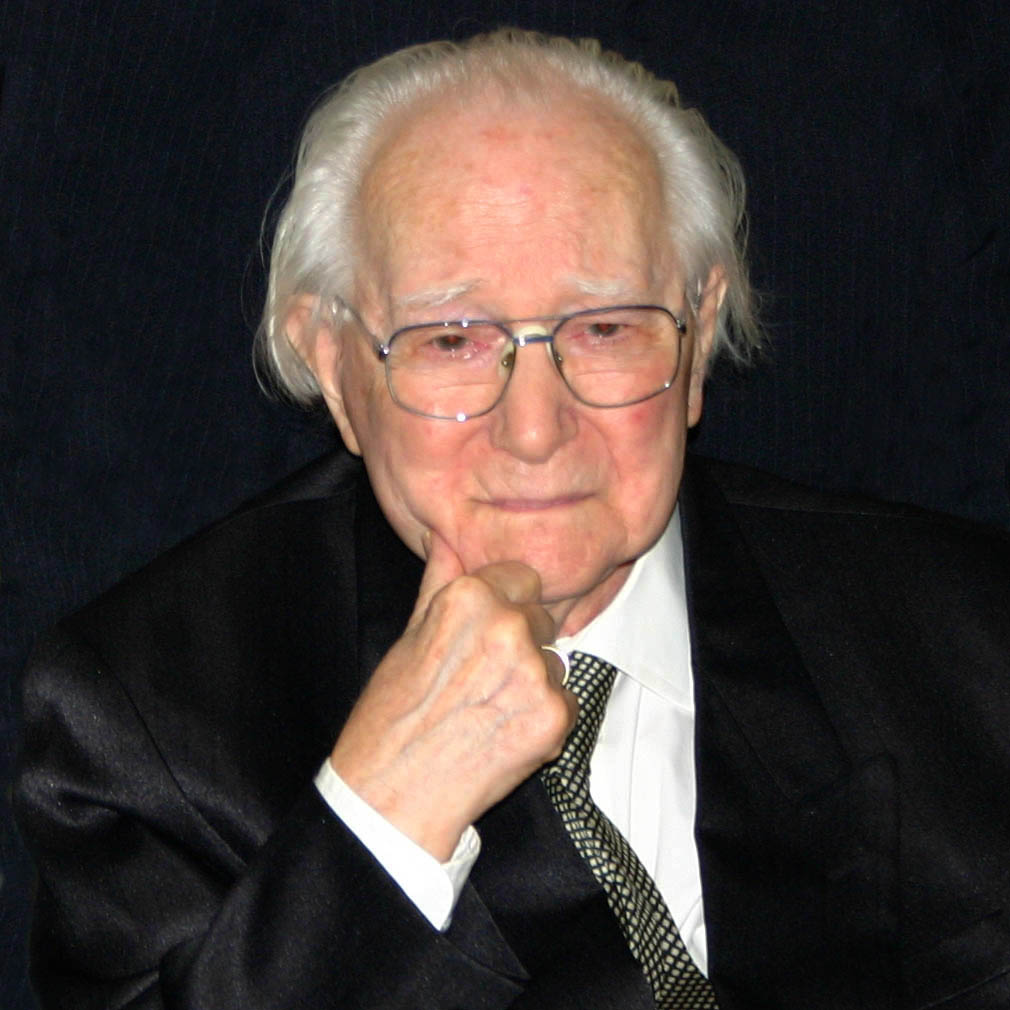
- Born: 12 August 1904; Budapest, Hungary
- Died: 3 November 2009 (aged 105); Budapest, Hungary
- Occupation: Abstract painter
- Website: lossonczy.com

Tamás Lossonczy (12 August 1904 – 3 November 2009) was a Hungarian abstract painter. He is considered by many critics to be one of the leading figures of modern art in Hungary of the 20th century.

After graduation from secondary school, Lossonczy began law studies, but soon afterward took an entrance examination to the Hungarian Academy of Fine Arts and was accepted. During the 1920s, he traveled frequently to Paris, where he befriended several prominent artists of the period. Upon his return to Hungary, he studied interior design at the Hungarian Academy of Applied Arts, where his interests temporarily shifted from painting to architecture.

In 1934, Lossonczy became a member of the Group of Socialist Artists. In 1938, he married Ibolya, a fellow art student. The couple exhibited many of their artworks in their home, but these pieces were destroyed when the house was bombed toward the end of World War II. Lossonczy was a member of the European School, the Avant-garde Artists of the Danube Valley, and the Hungarian Group of Concrete Art. From 1957 to 1968, he taught drawing at an industrial school in Budapest. In 1970, he had a small solo show at the Adolf Fényes Gallery, and in 1979 an exhibition of his work was held at Kunsthalle Budapest.

Lossonczy is a founding member of the Széchenyi Academy of Letters and Arts, established by the Hungarian Academy of Sciences in 1992. Among his best known works is his large-scale mosaic at the EUR-Magliana metro station in Rome, Italy, which was inaugurated in 1998. Another work, Great Storm Cleanses, is in remembrance of the 1956 Hungarian revolution.

== Personal life ==
In 1994 he received the Kossuth Prize. After the death of his first wife, Lossonczy remarried. In 2003, his second wife, Éda Pál, opened the Paris Blue Salon in Budapest, a gallery devoted to his paintings. He died in 2009, aged 105.
