= Moholy-Nagy University of Art and Design =

University in Budapest, Hungary

Coordinates: 47°31′02″N 18°59′23″E

- Moholy-Nagy Művészeti Egyetem
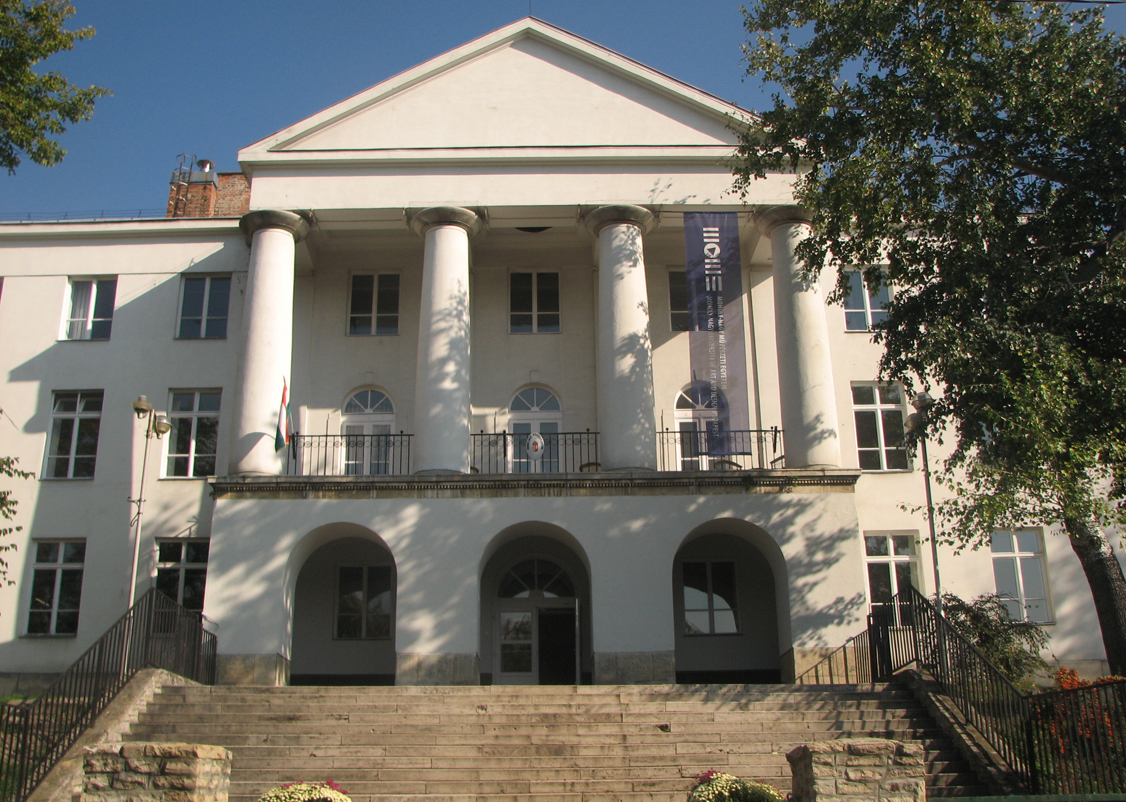
- Former names: National Royal Hungarian School of Applied Arts (1880–1946); Academy of Applied Arts (1946–1948); College of Applied Arts (1948–2000); University of Applied Arts (2000–2005)
- Established: 1880; 146 years ago
- Rector: Pál Koós (1 August 2024 –)
- Location: Zugligeti út 9, 1121, Budapest, Hungary
- Website: mome.hu/en/
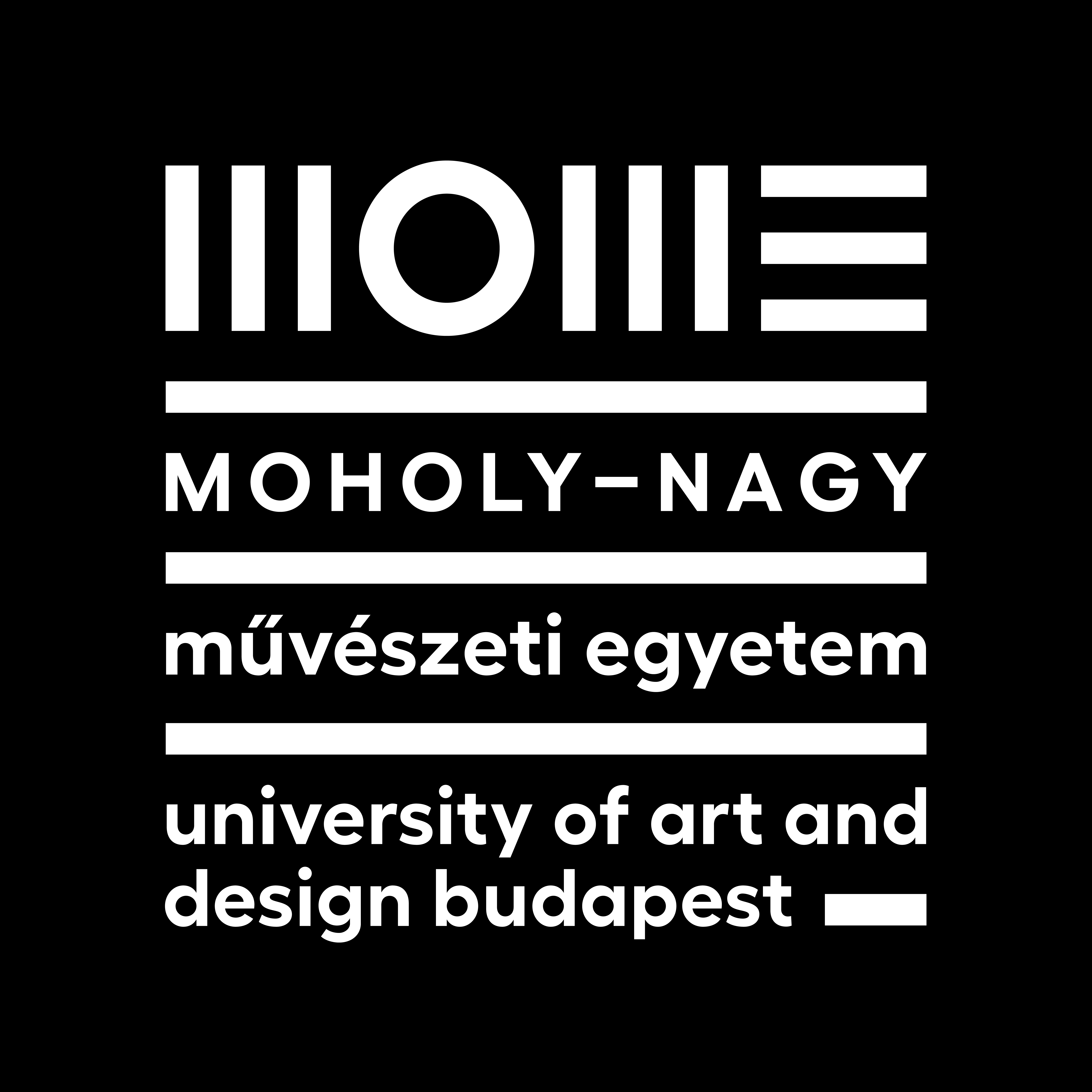

The Moholy-Nagy University of Art and Design (Hungarian: Moholy-Nagy Művészeti Egyetem [ˈmoholi ˈnɒɟ ˈmyːveːsɛti ˈɛɟɛtɛm], MOME), former Hungarian University of Arts and Design, is located in Budapest, Hungary. Named after László Moholy-Nagy, the university offers programs in art, architecture, designer and visual communication.

== History ==
The predecessor of the Moholy-Nagy University of Art and Design, the Hungarian Royal National School of Arts and Crafts, was founded in 1880 and operated under this name until 1944. Like other European Art Colleges, it evolved from a handicraft industry school, the Model Drawing School. Its founder and first director, Gusztáv Kelety declared the ‘educational support of a more artistic wood and furniture industry’ the aim of the new institution. The spirit of the school was fundamentally influenced by the Arts and Crafts Movement of Britain, as well as by Hungarian folklore.

At first there was only one department, in which architectural drawing and design were taught. Goldsmithing, xylography, and decorative carving classes started in 1883, while decorative painting and copperplate engraving classes began in 1884. (Enameling and jewelry design were added under the goldsmithing department in 1895.) The decorative sculpture class, uniting small sculpture and wood-carving, was established in 1885, along with a statuette carving class. In 1899, an interior design course was added.

In 1887 the school reorganized, changing the training program from a three-year course to a five-year course (with two years of foundational classes), and charging tuition for the first time, though poor students and those with scholarships could still attend free of charge. In 1896, the school, which had been scattered in different parts of Budapest, moved to the same building as the new Museum of Applied Arts, and came under the directorship of Kamill Flitter. The number of registered students at that time was 120.

In the early 20th century further courses were added in carpet (1907), lacework (1907), and ceramics (1909), and in 1910 the woodcarving and copperplate engraving courses were combined under the new heading of graphic design. Women were allowed to take courses at the school officially beginning in 1911, and general education classes were introduced that year as well.

During World War I a hospital operated out of the school, set up by teachers, students, and staff. By 1924 the school housed seven departments: interior design, decorative painting, decorative sculpture, graphic design, ceramics, goldsmithing and enameling, and textile design.

The idea of converting the school into a college arose in the early 1940s, but the rigours of the war years prevented any steps from being taken. During World War II the International Red Cross occupied to school building. Following the repair of damage suffered in the Second World War, teaching resumed in March 1945, and preparations to reorganise the school continued. In 1946 the ministry decided to elevate the school's rank; thus the College of Arts and Crafts was established.

In 1950 there were already six degree courses, and the number of students in 1952 rose to 280. In 1954 parts of the college moved to the present location in Zugligeti Street, into a building designed by Zoltán Farkasdy, but some of the workshops remained in the Kinizsi Street annex of the Museum of Applied Arts. In 1955 another reorganisation occurred: with the termination of the theatre stage design course, four degree courses remained: interior decoration, decorative painting, decorative sculpture and textile design. The industrial design degree course was initiated in 1959.

The appointment of Frigyes Pogány to the head of the college in 1964 ushered in a new era of reforms, coinciding with the growing appreciation of the social role of applied arts. In 1971 the college was granted university rank, but remained a college in name. In 1982, under István Gergely, a new series of reforms were introduced: the departments were changed into institutes, allowing students to earn college and university degrees in the incremental educational system. In the mid-1980s, the range of courses was extended with the establishment of photography, video and art management courses. The official gallery of the college, Tölgyfa Galéria, opened its doors to the public in Henger Street in 1987. With the appointment of the renowned ceramic artist Imre Schrammel to the head of the college, uniform university training was introduced, and the departments were re-established. In 1997, because of economic restrictions, the structure of the institution was modified again.

The university was accredited in 1998.

Since 1999, textile designer Judit Droppa has served as president of the university. In 2002 a far-reaching development plan was devised, the first phase calling for the removal of the Tölgyfa Gallery from Henger Street and the renovation of the main building of the university in the same year. The current rector of the university is József Fülöp.

In March 2006 the Hungarian University of Arts and Design announced its new name as Moholy-Nagy University of Art and Design.

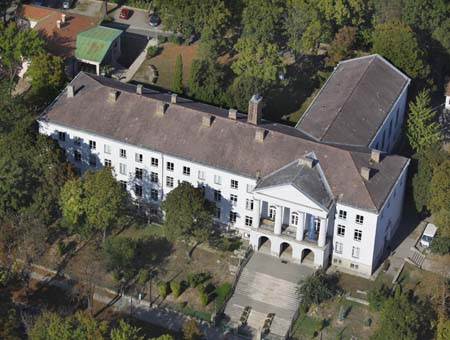

=== Departments ===
- Architecture
- Product Design
- Silicate Design
- Textile Design
- Media (graphic design, media design, animation, photography)

Others:

- Teacher Training
- Manager Training
- Doctoral Studies

=== Notable faculty and alumni ===
- Istvan Banyai
- Sándor Bortnyik
- Gyula Ernyey
- László Moholy-Nagy
- István Orosz
- Gábor Megyeri
- Ernő Rubik, the inventor of Rubik's Cube.
- János Németh
- Sándor Móga, goldsmith and sculptor
