= Sándor Móga =

Hungarian artist

Sándor Móga (March 1, 1927 – January 30, 2022) was a Hungarian sculptor, painter, and goldsmith.

== Life ==
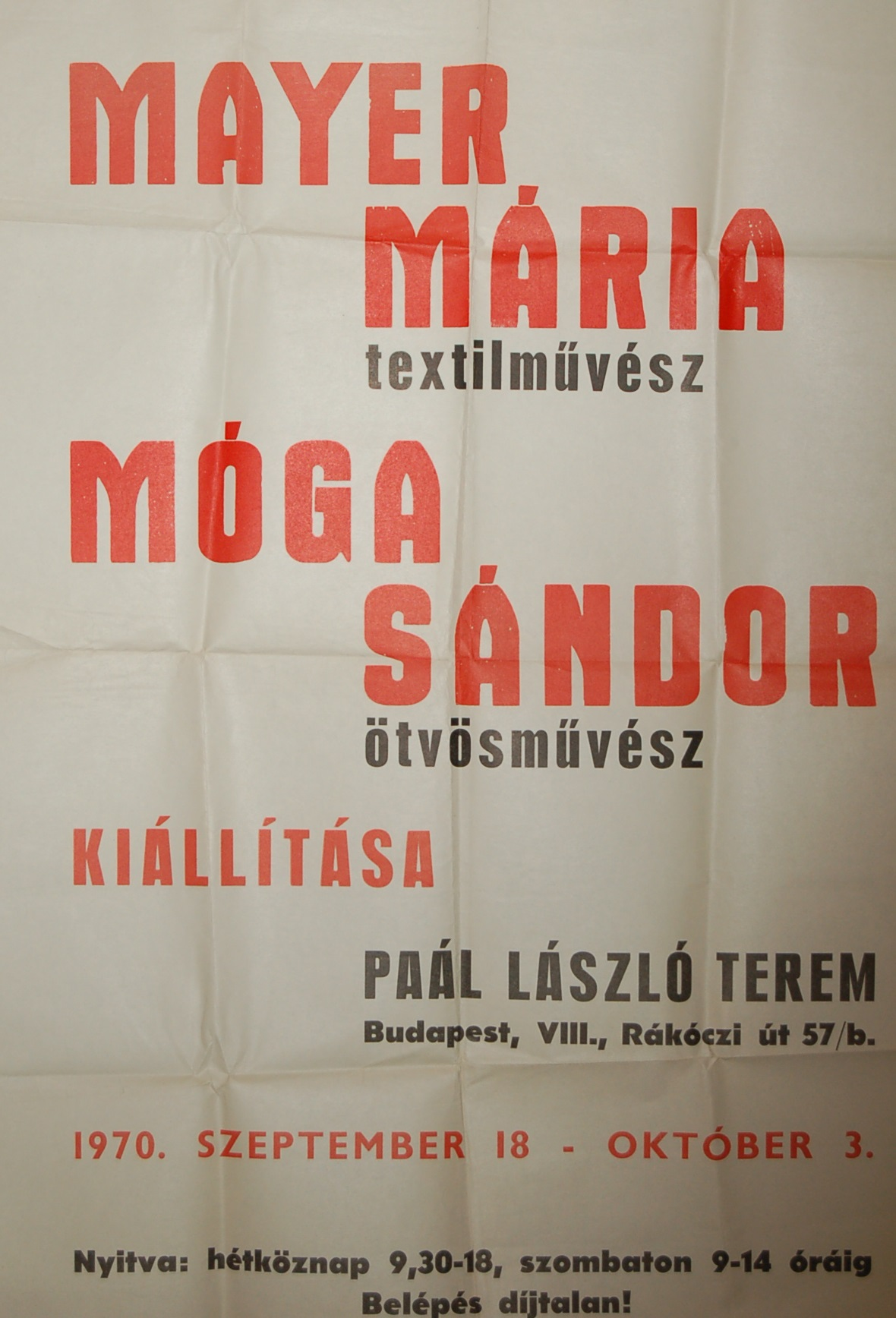
Poster of a joint exhibition in 1970

Sándor Móga was born on March 1, 1927, in Budapest's 8th district, as the youngest child of a middle-class family with three children. His father was Sándor Móga, a postal inspector, and his mother was Piroska Spannberger; his sisters were Emma Móga and Piroska Móga. He lost both of his parents early, by the age of 20.

He completed his primary education in Budapest, his secondary education in Košice, and later again in Budapest. Formative childhood experiences included summers regularly spent with his family in Fadd, from which his organic and nature-based inspirations also originate. Art engaged him from an early age; during his secondary-school years he modeled in the Rákospalota-based "Nagybányai Nagy Zoltán Artists' Circle."

In 1947 he began his studies at the College of Applied Arts (at present: Moholy-Nagy University of Art and Design) as a student of goldsmith Lajos Pál, sculptor Miklós Borsos, and painter Pál Miháltz. It was there that he formed a close friendship with sculptor Imre Szebényi. As a student, he was a member of the early MEFESZ (the Hungarian Association of University and College Students). On April 14, 1948, while still at the College, he was among the winners of a competition held by the National Hungarian Society of Applied Arts with his work (a flower-holder vase).

Although he completed his studies with distinction, he (together with several fellow students) became a victim of the paranoid atmosphere that developed at the College from 1948 around the person of their fellow student, namely the wife of Mr. Mátyás Rákosi: after two years he found himself outside the institution. Thereafter, alongside earning a living, he did not break off his connection with art: he attended the artists' circle led by sculptor Sándor Szandai, carving stone and modeling.

His wife and creative partner for 70 years was Éva Juliánna Szegedi (1928–2021), who herself was first a textile artist and later a goldsmith-trained applied artist.

He was a member of the Art Fund, and after its dissolution became a member of the National Association of Hungarian Creative Artists. From 1990 onward, he was also concurrently a member of the newly established Association for the Representation of Visual and Applied Artists' Interests.

== Artistic career ==
His artistic activity was not confined to jewelry goldsmithing; his primary focus was on the creation of art objects in metal. His attraction to sculpture was combined with his interest in goldsmithing. He produced outdoor sculptures carved from stone, small sculptural cast works, and sculptures created from metal using goldsmith techniques. His creative work culminated in the refinement of stylistic features—organic in nature and born of abstraction—most evident in small-series interior design objects (decorative trays, sculptures, caskets, small sculptural forms). These characteristics make his artworks distinctive even in the eyes of his contemporaries. In terms of materials, bronze, copper, and silver predominated in his early period, later supplemented by the use of vitreous enamel. The works presented at his first exhibition included sculptures made of bronze, lead, and stone.

After 1965 he worked full-time as a goldsmith, marking the beginning of a particularly productive period of his career.

As a special initiative, on December 17, 1967, a one-year exhibition series was launched at the Thorma János Museum, within the framework of which he reintroduced himself with his goldsmith artworks. Subsequently, he was given opportunities to appear in several further exhibitions.

His principal domestic commissioner was the Képcsarnok Company (the National Art Gallery State Enterprise); in addition, he sold numerous decorative objects abroad (e.g. to the GDR and Venezuela). His goldsmith works intended for sale are identified by the unmistakable "Móga" artist's proof mark (a hammered mark with a horizontal underline), in two versions (a smaller and a larger signature).

Toward the end of his artistic career, he experimented with modern artistic solutions. As part of a further search for new directions, he turned toward exploiting the broader possibilities of electrochemical techniques (electroforming, electroplating), combining these technological solutions with traditional handcraft methods such as manual forming of materials, welding, soldering, punching, repoussé, embossing, chasing, surface treatment and alloying, colored patination, and vitreous enameling. Particularly valuable are his patinated wall-mounted decorative plates made of red copper—sometimes also incorporating vitreous enamel inlays—often with themes of cultural anthropology or organic forms (figurative sheet-metal sculpture). These are unique works or produced in small series. In his later creative years, he also engaged in oil and watercolor painting.

In 1991, he participated with detailed plans (based on "motifs of Hungarian mythology") in the design competition announced by the Hungarian National Bank for the new forint coins of the Republic of Hungary.

In exceptional cases, he also undertook the restoration of metal artworks (for example, in 1995 the decorative chandelier of the church in Egervár, a work created in 1916 by István Németh).

In his own words:

It is now the fifth year since I became a goldsmith again. Since then I have been a member of the Art Fund, and my works have been embraced by my patron—the general public. I work a great deal, but happily. I cannot claim any particular honors, but my objects are known and appreciated not only at home but abroad as well. My aim is an artistic one: to express everything I can with my own distinctive tools and voice, in both small and large formats alike.

— Sándor Móga, Text of exhibition invitation card (László Paál Hall, Budapest, 1970).

== Critical reception ==
Prof. János Gróh, 1983:

Sándor Móga began his career as a sculptor, and with no small measure of talent, as evidenced by the success of his early work shown at numerous exhibitions. (...) He achieved significant results in exploring the possibilities inherent in materials; particularly noteworthy are the harmonious combinations of different metals—white and colored alike—for which, unfortunately, there are scarcely any precedents in Hungary. His aspirations were fortunate in that they ran in an inner parallel with the most valuable tendencies of modern artistic movements. (...) In his work, material and tool—that is, the mode of processing—are subordinated to the order of human perception, thereby acquiring a humanistic value and becoming imbued with human gestures; this is where their fullness is realized. Sándor Móga therefore belongs among those applied artists who have set themselves a high goal.

— Opening speech by János Gróh painter and professor, Solo Exhibition, László Paál Hall, Budapest, 1983

Művészet Art Journal, 1970:

Clear criticism of these works is offered by both domestic and international audiences when they willingly purchase them: goldsmith objects that testify to thorough professional preparation and contain an honorable concentration. What engages me, however, are those works by Sándor Móga—who started as a sculptor but made his living as a goldsmith—that stretch the goldsmith genre toward sculpture, at times transgressing "generic" boundaries. Our sculptor, disciplined by the technical rigor of goldsmithing, is not left in peace by the demand for expression. His intention is for his works to proclaim his thoughts, emotions, and his committed aspiration—written in forms—to improve humankind. [...] Sándor Móga most fully finds his sculptural self where, even as a goldsmith, he gives the most: in his compositions Human Pair and Mother with Child. In the clearly perceptible refinements of the taut, disciplined forms of these works, the message and confession of the person shaping metal—the shaper of matter—about the possible beauty is manifested with commanding dignity.

— Gyula Kovács, art historian, Művészet (Art Journal), 1970/12, p. 39.

Thorma János Museum, 1967:

The inclusion of county-level visual artists and nationally renowned sculptors in the exhibitions resulted in significant public success.

— Annual Report of the Thorma János Museum, 1967

Képes Újság, 1970:

The works seen at the exhibition testify to a purposeful artist with an individual voice.

— Képes Újság (Journal), October 24, 1970, p. 8.

Prof. Ákos Koczogh, 1977:

There are no groups or schools in contemporary metal art; each artist follows the path they have found for themselves. Many of our artists have not yet developed a fully formed style, but especially among the younger generation, bold initiative is characteristic. [...] In Sándor Móga's work, an essentially romantic outlook (dripped applications) negotiates with a constructive approach manifested in strong compositional ability.

— Ákos Koczogh, art historian and university professor, Metallurgy. (Budapest, 1977, Fine Arts Fund Publishing Company, pp. 31–33, ISBN 978-963-336-073-6)

Noémi Ferenczy Award, 2016:

The persistent creative work carried out over nearly sixty years—evident in decorative trays, sculptures, caskets, small sculptural forms, and interior design objects—culminated in the refinement of organic stylistic features complemented by vitreous enamel. These characteristics render his artworks exceptionally distinctive, even in the eyes of his peers.

— Nomination for the Ferenczy Noémi Award, 2016

== Exhibitions ==
=== Solo Exhibitions ===
- 1970, Budapest – László Paál Hall, Képcsarnok Company (September 1970 – 63 works exhibited)
- 1983, Budapest – László Paál Hall, Képcsarnok Company (September 1–15, 1983)

=== Selected Group Exhibitions ===
- 1957, Miskolc – 3rd National Fine Arts Exhibition in Miskolc, Ottó Herman Museum
- 1962, Budapest – 9th Hungarian Fine Arts Exhibition, Hall of Art (April 29 – June 30, 1962)
- 1967–1968, Kiskunhalas – Thorma János Museum (as part of an exhibition series)
- Szeged
- 1990, Budapest – Csontváry Hall, Collective Exhibition (Képcsarnok Company and Association for the Representation of Visual and Applied Artists' Interests, July 19–28, 1990)
- 1990, Budapest – István Csók Gallery, Collective Exhibition (Képcsarnok Company and Association for the Representation of Visual and Applied Artists' Interests, July 19–28, 1990)
- 2022, Paris-Versailles – Salon international d'art contemporain, Paris Expo Porte de Versailles (Pavillon 5, January 2022).

== Further sources ==
- Műgyűjtő (Journal) 1970/2. 58. p. and 1971/1. 56. p.
- Koczogh Ákos: Fémművesség/Metallurgy, Budapest: Fine Arts Fund Publishing Company, pp. 31–33 (1977)
- Bakonyvári M. Ágnes: Kortárs ötvösművészet/Contemporary Goldsmith Art (National Association of Hungarian Creative Artists, 2001)
