= János Németh (sculptor) =

Hungarian sculptor (1934–2026)

- Born: 16 March 1934; Zalaegerszeg, Hungary
- Died: 22 June 2026 (aged 92)
- Education: Moholy-Nagy University of Art and Design
- Occupation: Sculptor

János Németh (16 March 1934 – 22 June 2026) was a Hungarian sculptor. He was a recipient of the Kossuth Prize (2014).

Németh died on 22 June 2026, at the age of 92.
