= Hanna Honthy =

Hungarian opera singer and actress

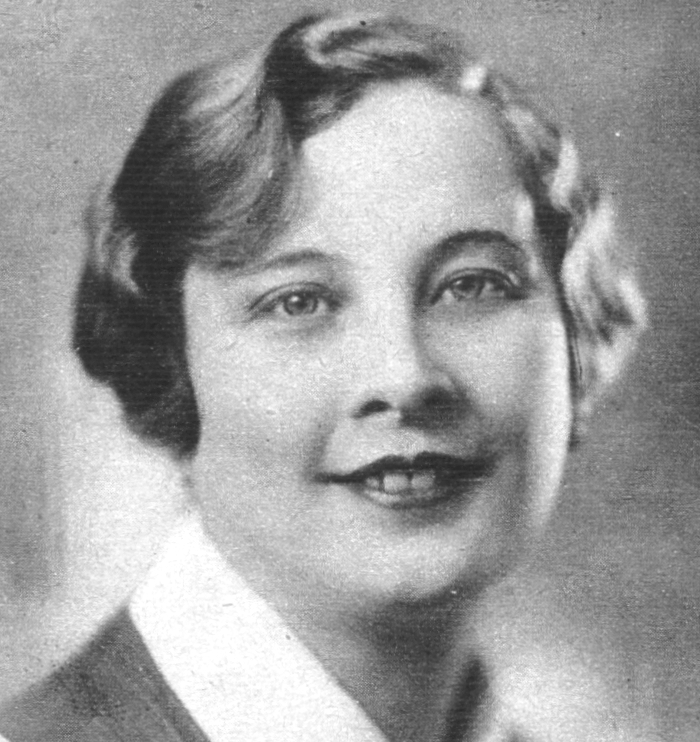
- Honthy in 1930
- Born: Hajnalka Hügel; 21 February 1893; Budapest, Austria-Hungary
- Died: 30 December 1978 (aged 85); Budapest, Hungary
- Occupations: Operetta singer; actress

Hanna Honthy (born Hajnalka Hügel; 21 February 1893 – 30 December 1978), was a Hungarian operetta singer and actress.

== Career ==
Hügel was born on 21 February 1893, in Budapest. From age 10, she was a ballet student at the Opera. She finished her training as a private student and learned acting with Szidi Rákos between 1914 and 1915, then from Ödön Bárdi between 1915 and 1917, and singing from renowned tenor Georg Anthes. After appearing as an actress in Pozsony, Fiume, and Szombathely by the name of Hanna Honthy, she returned to Budapest in 1920. In Budapest her first success came in the Blaha Lujza theatre. She appeared in numerous theaters during her career including the Vígszínház, Városi Színház, achieving fame as a 'prima donna'. Her critically acclaimed voice and acting talent bore fruit for many years. She was the member of the Fővárosi Operettszínház [Budapest Operetta] between 1925-1927 and 1949. She also appeared in film. She was awarded the Kossuth Prize in 1953.

== Filmography ==
=== Movies ===
- Budapesti hangos filmkabaré (1931)
- Régi nyár (1941)
- Déryné (1951)
- Díszelőadás (1955)
- Bástyasétány '74 (1974)

=== TV movies ===
- Csárdáskirálynő (1963)
- Nyolcvanéves Cecília

== Gallery ==
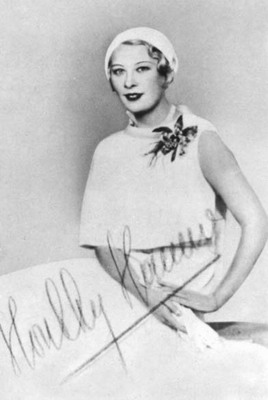
Hanna Honthy

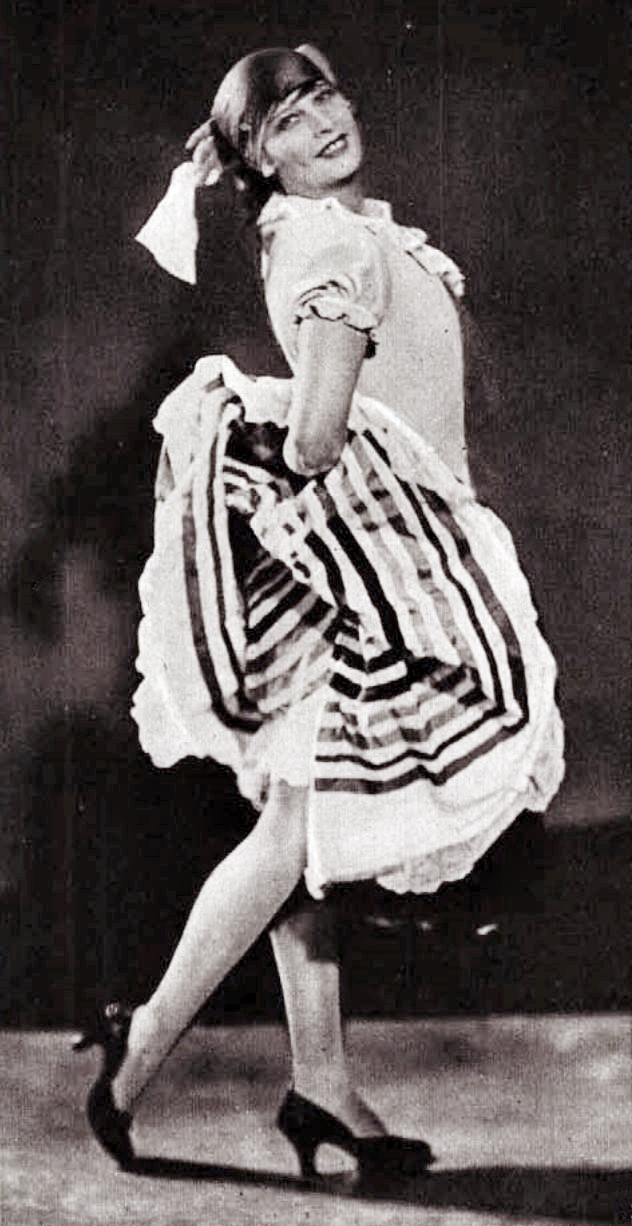
Hanna Honthy in performance

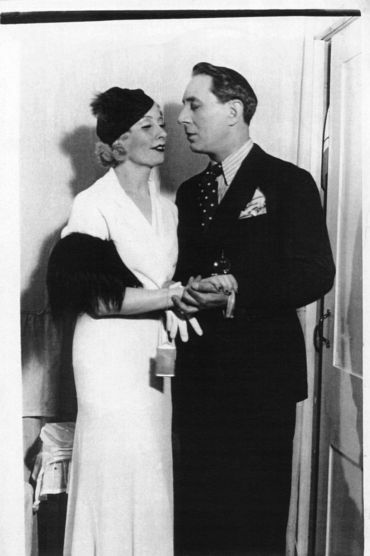
Hanna Honthy and Jenő Törzs

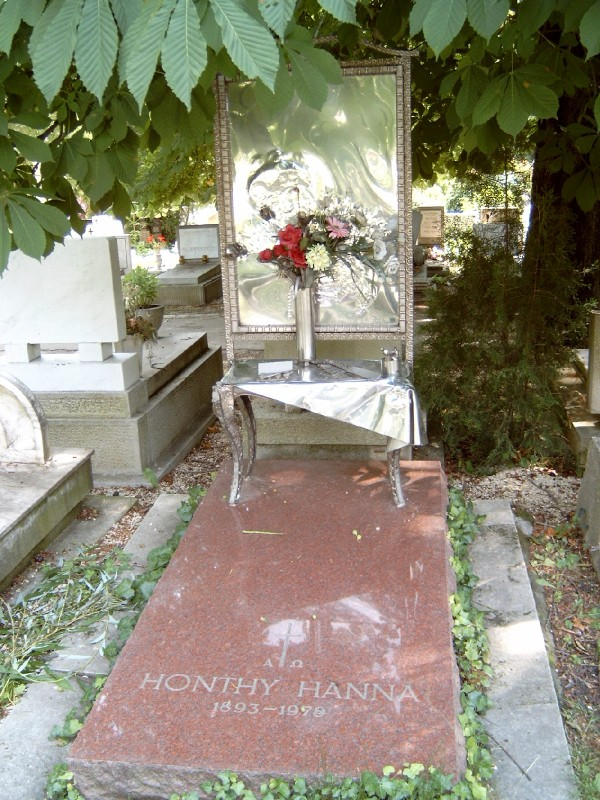
The grave of Hanna Honthy at the Farkasréti Cemetery in Budapest

== Sources ==
- Gál Péter Molnár. Honthy Hanna és kora Budapest: Magvető, 1997. ISBN 978-963-14-2066-1.
- Hanna Honthy in the Hungarian Biographical Lexicon freely available online at mek.niif.hu
