= Antal Hidas =

Hungarian poet (1899–1980)

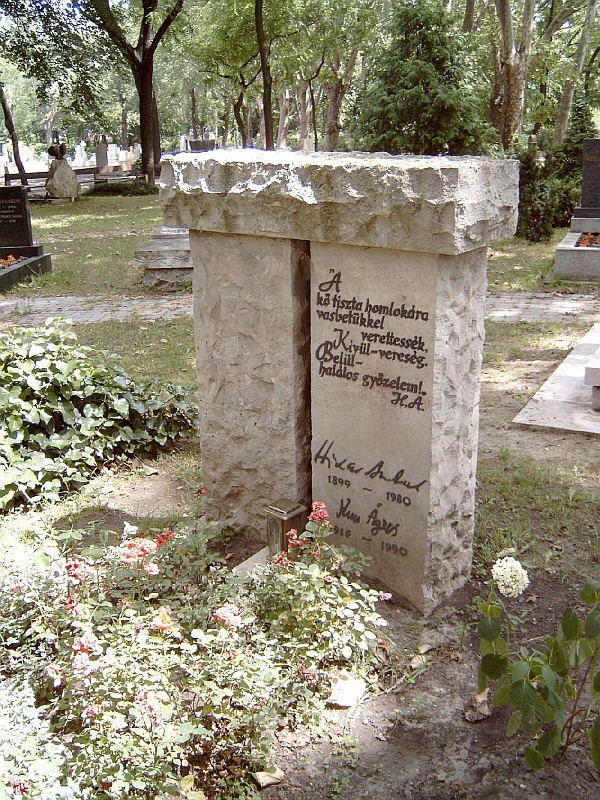
Hidas' grave

Antal Hidas (18 December 1899 – 22 January 1980) was a Hungarian communist writer, poet and translator.

In 1921, following the defeat of the Hungarian Soviet Republic, he and his future wife Judit Szántó emigrated to Czechoslovakia, where their child, Éva Szántó, was born. They returned to Hungary in 1924 and divorced the following year.

In 1926 he emigrated again, to the Soviet Union, where he married Ágnes Kun, Béla Kun's daughter.

Hidas was arrested in January 1938 during the Great Purge (seven months after his father-in-law Béla Kun's arrest), but survived the Gulag and returned to Hungary in 1959.

He won the Kossuth Prize in 1962.

Hidas died of cancer in 1980. He is buried with his wife Ágnes Kun in the Fiume Road Graveyard in Budapest.
