= Mór Korach =

Mór Korach or Maurizio Korach (8 February 1888 − 27 November 1975) was a Hungarian chemical engineer, founder of technical chemistry in Hungary, and a full member of the Hungarian Academy of Sciences. Residing in Italy between 1912 and 1952, he was internationally recognized for his ceramic engineering researches, significantly developing the Italian ceramic industry.

He was born in Miskolc, Hungary, and studied at the Budapest University of Technology until 1911, then migrated to Italy in 1912 for political reasons. From 1916 until 1932 on he was a teacher in the art school of International Museum of Ceramics in Faenza, also directed the research laboratory of the museum. After 1925 he was the chairman of the technical chemistry department at the University of Bologna. During World War II he joined the Italian Communist Party and took part in the resistance movement. Called by the Hungarian government he moved back to Hungary in 1952. He assisted to the foundation of the Central Research Institute for Construction Materials of which he was the first director between 1953 and 1957. From 1960 until 1968 he was acting as founder director of the Research Institute of Technical Chemistry in Budapest.

His main research field was the technical chemistry of ceramic manufacture, chemical processing of ceramics. In 1928 he was the first to invent and construct an electric tunnel kiln, later on he worked out a new ceramics firing method (what he named 'sandwich firing'). In addition to this he also made extensive researches on thermal insulators and technology of glazed tile manufacture. During the late period of his career he put down the theoretical fundamentals of technical chemistry and successfully adapted mathematical models (e.g. graph theory) to describe chemical processes.

He was a corresponding (1956), then a full member (1958) of the Hungarian Academy of Sciences. In Italy he was a popular writer under the name of Marcello Cora; he collaborated to prestigious review La Ronda and wrote novels such as Il figliuol prodigo (1933). He died in Budapest, Hungary.

== Works ==
- Elementi di tecnologia ceramica I–III. Faenza, Museo delle ceramiche, 1928, 51 + 48 + 83 p.
- On methodological problems of technology. in: Periodica Polytechnica 1958. 145–171.
- Általános kémiai technológia. [General chemical technology.] Budapest, Tankönyvkiadó, 1967, 327 p.

== See also ==
- A Magyar Tudományos Akadémia tagjai 1825–2002 II. [Members of the Hungarian Academy of Sciences 1825-2002.] Budapest, 2003, pp. 667.
- Carmine Di Biase - Maurizio Korach(Marcello Cora): la Ronda e la letteratura tedesca, Napoli, Societa' editrice napoletana, 1978.
