= György Szrogh =

- Born: György Szrogh; 23 January 1915; Csömör, Austria-Hungary
- Died: 29 November 1999; Budapest, Hungary
- Education: Royal Joseph Polytechnic University, Budapest
- Occupation: Architect
- Buildings: Piszkéstető Station

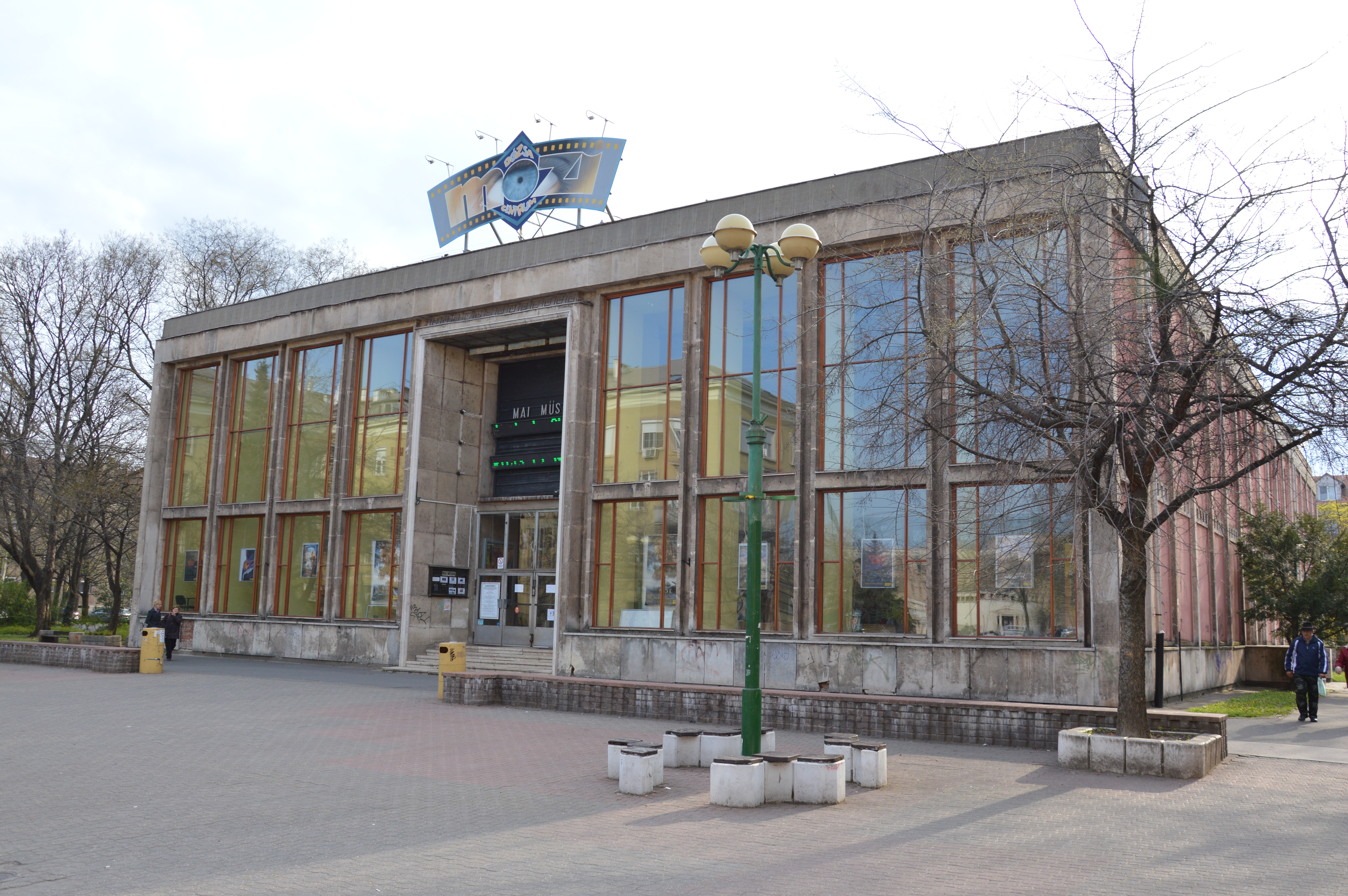
Exterior of Dózsa Cinema in Dunaújváros. Built in 1952-53

György Szrogh (January 23, 1915 – 29 November 1999) was a Hungarian architect and professor. He graduated in 1938 from Royal Jozsef Nador Technical University. After finished his studies, he worked in several places, such as the Louis Hidas studio, MÉMOSZ Construction Company, City Building Research Institute (VATI) and Residential Building Design Bureau (LAKÓTERV). He had participated in the UNESCO foreign exchange program between 1966 and 1967. At that time he was in England, Mexico and United States of America, when he learned new principles and methods of design. From 1966 he was professor at the Hungarian College of Applied Arts and led the Department of Architecture from 1966 to 1984.

Regarding his way of design, Szrogh began in the spirit of neoclassicism, but soon his approach became near the modernism of Bauhaus, and his focus turned to functional and technological aspects. His buildings were characterized by well-organized and clean designs. Some important works are: Mémosz Headquarters (which were a team work inside MÉMOSZ Construction Company and is famous as one of the latest modernist buildings in Budapest); the main building of the Konkoly Observatory’s Piszkéstető Station; the dome of the 60/90 cm Schmidt Telescope in the early 1960s; and the Hotel Budapest (1967) at the Buda hillside, which is a symbol of the late 1960s architecture in Hungary.

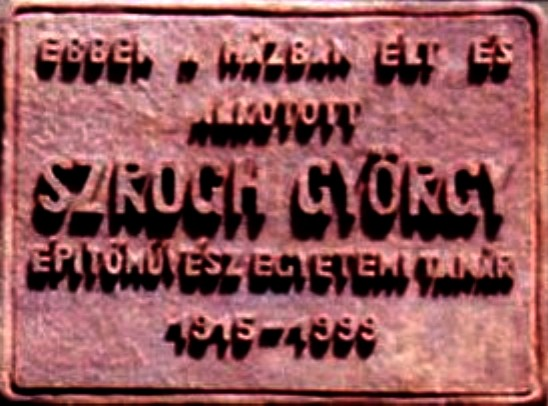
György Szrogh commemorative plaque in Budapest District III, Szépvölgyi Street No 1/c
