= Márta Fábián =

Márta Fábián (born 1946 in Budapest) is a Hungarian cimbalom player and soloist.

== Early life and education ==
Fábián began playing at the age of 8. Since 1956 she has been a member of the Broadcast Children Choir. She received a diploma at the Cimbalom Department of the Béla Bartók Musical Secondary School in 1964 and at the Pedagogy Department of the Ferenc Liszt Academy in 1967.

== Work ==
She was the cimbalom player of the Budapest Dance Ensemble from 1967 to 1973, among many other activities. She plays contemporary music with lyrics in modern and classical style, and she also plays for films. To have enough time to prepare and make her first solo record (CIMBALOM RECITAL Hungaroton SLPX 11686), she left the ensemble. She signed with Komische Oper in Berlin, where she played from 1973 to 1975 in the Háry János (opera composed by Zoltán Kodály), directed by Walter Felsenstein. After that she worked with András Mihály, György Kurtág. She played three compositions on that record and received the first prize of the French Disc Academy in 1977.

Starting in 1974, she was a soloist for the National Philharmony for twenty years. She is connected with several composers, including Kurtág, R. Maros, Kocsár, Ránki, Láng, Szokolay, Petrovics, Hidas, L. Sáry, Vántus, Balassa, Hollós, Vajda, M. Maros, Eötvös and others. Foreign composers she has worked with include B.A.Zimmermann, Henri Dutilleux, Pierre Boulez, Holliger, D. Schnebel, K. Huber, J. Petric, André Bon, R. Wittinger, Liza Lim and others. She has 10 records of her own and plays on more than 20 records.

She is a returning guest of European festivals such as Holland Festival, Warsawian Autumn, Biennales of Berlin, Venice, Zagreb, Helsinki, München, Wien Modern, Salzburger Festspiele, Bartók Seminary in Szombathely, Avignon, Festival d’Automne (Paris), Proms (London), I.G.M.M. Festival in Graz, Athens; Welfmusiktage (Essen), Mondsee Festival, György Kurtág Festival, Milano etc. She performed duets with guitar and with cimbalom, played in trios with flute and guitar, flute and cello. She was a member of the Budapest Chamber Ensemble throughout its existence.

She played with the Ensemble Intercontemporain and for more than 10 years with the Ensemble Modern (Frankfurt). She received the Liszt-prize in 1979, she is meritorious artist in 1988. She performed in Mexico, the United States, Iceland, in Egypt, in Israel and in almost all European countries. She played in the World Exposition of Sevilla. Fábián worked with Doráti, with Claudio Abbado in the Gustav Mahler Jugend Orchester. She performed with the Berliner Philharmonie, with Boulez and Eötvös beside the E. Intercontemporain and E. Modern. She performed with other orchestras, including the Junge Deutsche Philharmonie, Süddeutsche R.O., K.R.S.O.( Köln ), O.R.F. Symphonie Orchestra, BBC Symphony Orchestra, Radio Kamer Oukest ( Hilversum ), Chamber Orchestra of Europe, Monnaie Orchestra (Bruxelles. She worked with well-known conductors, such as Eric Leinsdorf, R. Frühbeck de Burgos, K. Meller, L. Hager, T. Vásáry, Z. Kocsis, E. Imbal, W. Ashkenazy, J. Ferencsik, Gy. Lehel, H. Zender, I. Metzmacher, J. Nott, M. Caridis, M. Stenz, O. Sallaberger, J. P. Saraste, Neeme Jarvi and Olivier Cuendet. She gives master-courses for young musicians.

== Discography ==
- 1974 Cimbalom Recital (Hungaroton SLPX 11686)
- 1977 Cimbalon Music from Hungarian Countries (Qualiton Records SLPX 10140)
- 1978 Contemporary Hungarian Cimbalom Music (Hungaroton SLPX 11899)
- 1979 Contemporary Hungarian Cimbalom Music, Vol.2 (Hungaroton SLPX 12012)
- 1979 Baroque Music (with others, Hungaroton 12117)
- 1979 Musica Da Camera No.2 / Three Pieces For Flute And Cimbalom / Four Intermezzos / Sonata For Horn And Piano / Concerto Da Camera (with others, Hungaroton SLPX 12061)
- 1979 Hungarian Cimbalom Music (Hungaroton SLPX 18062)
- 1981 Bach: French Suites BWV 813, 814, 816 (with Ágnes Szakály, Hungaroton SLPX 12309)
- 1983 György Ránki: Symphony No.1 / Cimbalom Concerto / Viola Concerto (with others, Hungaroton SLPX 12434)
- 1986 Messages Of The Late R.V. Troussova / Scenes From A Novel (with others, Hungaroton SLPX 12776)
- 1988 Baroque Music for Cimbalom (White Label HRC 097)
- 1988 Cimbalom Concertos by Contemporary Hungarian Composers (Hungaroton)
- 1990 All That Music: A Cimbalom Recital by Márta Fábián (Hungaroton SLPX 31120)
- 2001 Psy - Charm of the Cimbalom (Hungaroton HCD 32015)

== Eötvös ==
Peter Eötvös composed Psychokosmos for her, combining a cimbalom solo with the orchestra. Her collaboration with Eötvös spanned 30 years, including many performances with the Budapesti Fesztivál Zenekar.
