= Pál Závada =

Hungarian writer (born 1954)

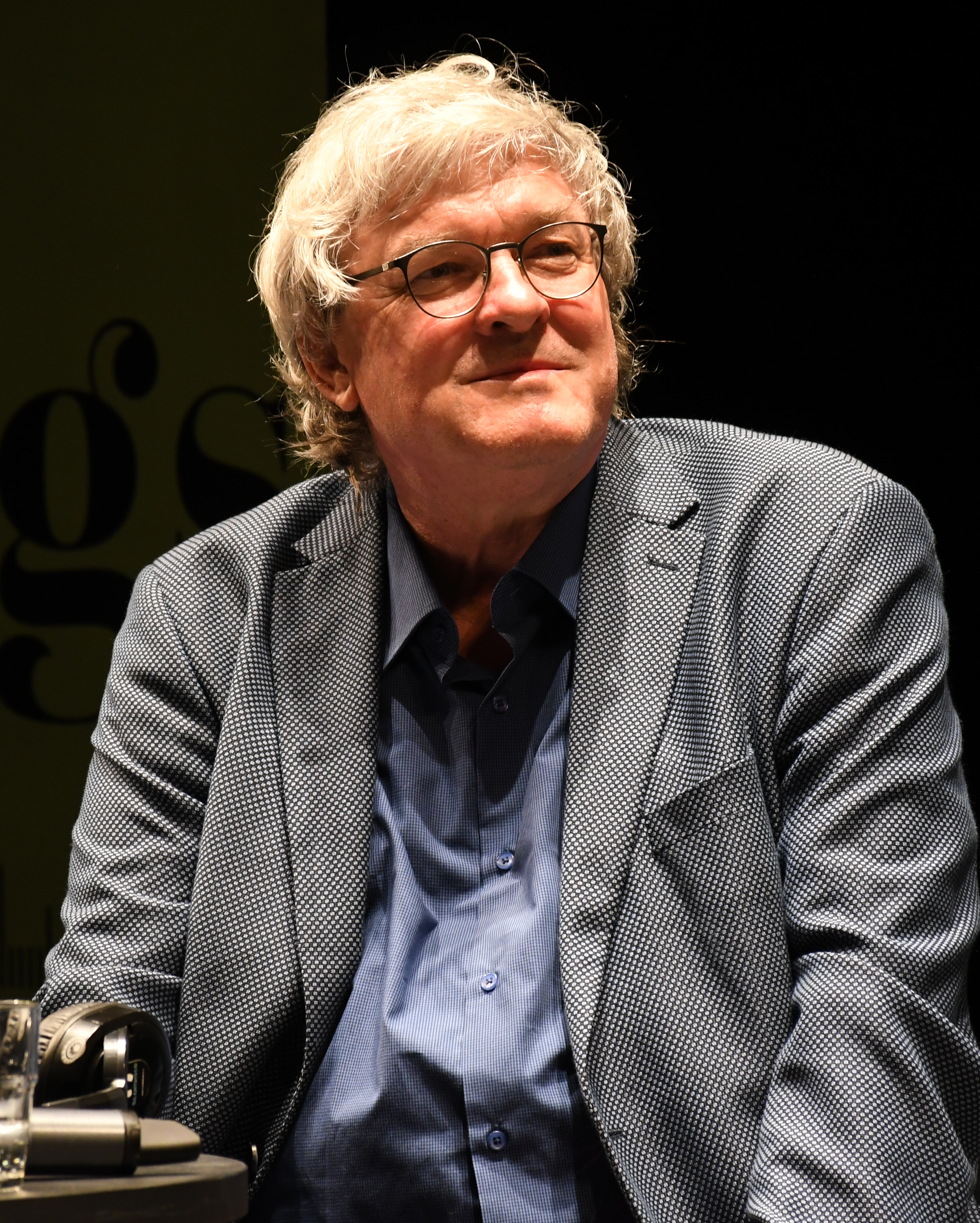
Závada in 2020

Pál Závada (born 14 December 1954 in Tótkomlós, Hungary) is a Hungarian writer. He is a member of the Slovak minority in Hungary, but he writes in Hungarian.

His elder son, Péter Závada, is a poet and rapper of the underground hip-hop duo, Akkezdet Phiai.

== Books ==
- Kulákprés. Család- és falutörténeti szociográfia. Tótkomlós, 1945–1956 (1991)
- Mielőtt elsötétül (1996)
- Jadviga párnája (1997)
- Milota (2002)
- A fényképész utókora (2004)
- Idegen testünk (2008)
- Harminchárom szlovák népmese (2010)
- Egy sor cigány. Huszonnégy mai magyar (2011)
- Janka estéi (2012)
- Természetes fény (2014)
- Hajó a ködben (2019)
