= Nők Lapja =

Hungarian weekly women's magazine

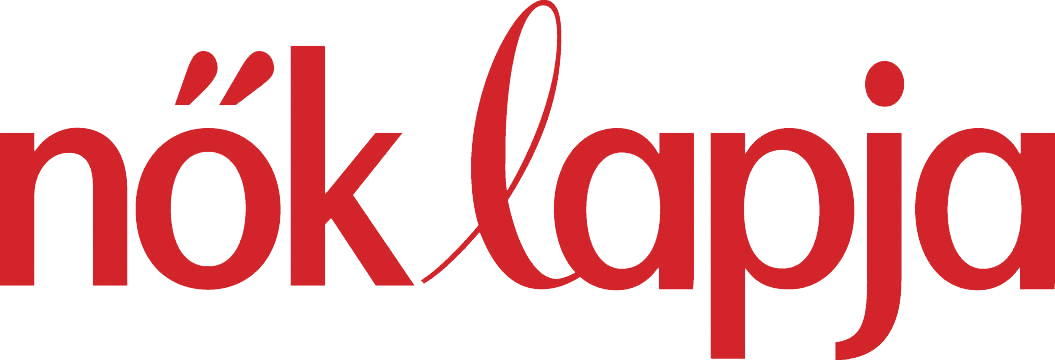
- Editor-in-chief: Andrea Vékási
- Categories: Women's
- Frequency: Weekly
- First issue: 20 October 1949
- Company: Central Médiacsoport Zrt.
- Country: Hungary
- Based in: Budapest
- Language: Hungarian
- Website: noklapja.nlcafe.hu
- ISSN: 0029-0963

Nők Lapja (Hungarian pronunciation: [ˈnøːk ˈlɒpjɒ], "Women's Magazine") is a Hungarian weekly women's magazine currently published by Central Médiacsoport Zrt.. Established in 1949, it remains one of the leading weekly magazines in Hungary. As of 2020, its editor-in-chief is Andrea Vékási.

== History ==
The magazine's predecessor was titled Asszonyok ("Women" or "Ladies"), which was first published in June 1945 by the Democratic Association of Hungarian Women (MNDSZ), with the support of the Hungarian Communist Party. On 1 October 1949, the magazine ceased publication. Shortly, Asszonyok was replaced by Nők Lapja, with its first issue published on 20 October 1949.

On 21 October 2011, Andrea Vékási replaced Gabriella Molnár as editor-in-chief.
