= Aristid von Würtzler =

Hungarian-American harpist (1925–1997)

Aristid von Würtzler (born as Würtzler Arisztid) (September 20, 1925, Budapest – November 30, 1997, Debrecen) Hungarian-American harpist, composer, leader of the New York Harp Ensemble.

== Biography ==
Aristid von Würtzler was born into a middle-class family. His father was a violinist, a music critic and composer, who had devoted much attention to his sons’ musical education. His older brother, Béla Würtzler also became a musician. Aristid received his education at the Lutheran High School in Aszód and at the Franz Liszt Academy of Music in Budapest.

Initially Aristid studied piano and cello, and then switched to harp at the age of 12–13 years. His first teacher was Henrik Rohmann. At the academy he studied harp with Miklós Rékai and composition with Zoltán Kodály. Würtzler was expelled from the academy once because he had not attended lectures on Marxism. But he was taken back by the intervention of Director Ede Zathureczky. Of his teachers he remembered Zoltán Kodály with pleasure. He considered him his mentor and invited him later to the USA.

Würtzler's last performance in Hungary took place on 22 November 1956, in the Opera House when he was substituting for the bedridden Rékai.

When the revolution began he left Hungary with Béla. Although he did not take part in the events of the Hungarian revolution, nevertheless he was afraid of retribution. However he believed that a harpist's career could reach its full potential only in a freer world. He went first to Vienna and then established his residence in the United States. Speaking no English he took a number of odd jobs; he even collected waste empty bottles. For a time he lived in a house occupied by prostitutes, who kindly loaned him the money to buy his first harp.

In 1958 Würtzler began his new career as the first harpist of the Detroit Symphony Orchestra and then the New York Philharmonic. Leonard Bernstein (musical director) auditioned him; Aristid played, inter alia, Smetana's Vltava, Debussy's Prelude to the Afternoon of a Faun, and Bartók's Concerto for (Piano and) Orchestra. Béla remained in Detroit and only later joined the Boston Symphony Orchestra.

The International Harp Contest, held in Israel, was the first harp competition in the world. It was launched in 1959 by A. Z. Propes. Three years later, in 1962, Pierre Jamet, the French virtuoso and professor of harp founded the International Association of Harpists and Friends of the Harp,

These events inspired Würtzler to become an active member of the American harp community. From 1963 he served as a professor of Harp at the University of Hartford where he established annual Harp Master Classes. He invited famous foreign musicians to join his master classes, e.g. the above-mentioned Pierre Jamet; Hans Joachim Zingel, the renowned expert of harp-literature from Cologne; the Belgian and Soviet harpists Mireille Flour and Vera Dulova; and Khachaturian, the Armenian composer.

In 1969, Würtzler organized the first international harp competition ever held in the United States thought his primacy is contested by some. During this time he had had many confrontations with others, so, in 1970, he moved on. He served as a professor at New York University, Hofstra University, Queens College of the City University of New York and Bridgeport University in Connecticut.

Also in 1970, Würtzler formed his own band, a group of four harps, internationally known as the New York Harp Ensemble (NYHE). As an established composer and an arranger he created for the group a repertoire of almost two hundred pieces. There were four women in the group; his wife, the Polish-born Barbara Pniewska was also a founding member.

With the ensemble and also as a soloist Würtzler performed in over sixty countries, made numerous compact discs and had several invitations to play at the White House during the Carter, Reagan, Bush and Clinton administrations. He was also invited to perform for Pope John Paul II at the Vatican in 1985. The NYHE hit their prime in the 1970s and 1980s.

In his other pursuits, Würtzler served as a member of the Jury at the Harp Contests in Israel, Switzerland and Italy. He also presided at Harp Master Classes in Germany.

In spite of his international acclaim, in his heart Würtzler remained passionately devoted to his native Hungary and he returned regularly from the mid-seventies. Although he was embittered by the situation of music- and especially harp education, he devoted his energies to the musical life of his country. He established annual Harp Master Classes and gave several concerts in Budapest, in Szombathely and in the Helikon Castle in Keszthely. He performed with Éva Marton on several occasions and some of his (latest) records were issued by Hungaroton.

Besides his teaching he also found time to add to and extend harp-literature. He called upon famous composers (e.g. Bernstein, Karlheinz Stockhausen, György Ligeti, etc.) to write pieces for harp and he himself composed many original pieces, transcriptions and adaptations.

Würtzler died on November 30, 1997, of a heart attack while touring in Hungary, where he was appearing as a conductor. He was cremated and his ashes were returned to his native Budapest. Carl Swanson harp-maker, his former Hartford pupil wrote an obituary for him. He noted in another of his writings that Würtzler's bisbigliando was magical; nobody else could do it better.

== Orchestras ==
- Hungarian State Orchestra (Hungary), 1951–56
- Detroit Symphony Orchestra (USA), 1957–58
- New York Philharmonic (USA), 1958–61

== Education ==
- Hartt College of Music, University of Hartford (USA), 1963–70
- New York University (USA), 1970–87
- Hofstra University (USA), 1970–72
- University of Bridgeport (USA), 1974–78
- Aaron Copland School of Music, Queens College, City University (USA), 1982–1997

== Harp competition and master courses ==
- Hartt College of Music, University of Hartford (USA), 1963–1970
- New College, Sarasota, Florida - Summer Festival (USA), 1970, 1971
- State University of New York - Planting Fields (USA), 1970
- Sion (Switzerland), Heimbach (Germany) and Gitta de Castello, (Italy) 1972–78
- Shanghai, Beijing (China), 1982
- Cairo Conservatoire (Egypt), 1985
- Franz Liszt Academy of Music (Hungary), 1987
- Szombathely (Hungary), 1988
- Keszthely (Hungary), from 1990

== Jury ==
- International Harp Competition (Switzerland), 1964, 1974
- International Harp Competition (Israel), 1965 (honorary member)
- International Harp Competition (USA), 1969
- International Harp Competition (Italy), 1978, 1980

== Works, compositions ==
=== Commissioned pieces ===
- Concert Improvisation - Hartt College of Music (USA), 1969
- Little Suite - Nimura Harp Ensemble (Japan), 1970
- Modern Sketches - Rhine Chamber Orchestra (Germany), 1972

=== Harp solos ===
- Bartók, Béla Vol. I. for Solo Harp (Lyra Music, International Music Service)
- Brilliant Romantic Etude (General Music Publication)
- Capriccio for Solo Harp. Memory of Salzedo (Lyra Music, International Music Service)
- Concert Improvisation (Lyra Music, International Music Service)
- Donizetti, Gaetano - von Würtzler: Lucia di Lammermoori. Paraphrase (General Music Publication)
- Händel, George Friedrich - von Würtzler: Concerto in F Major with Cadenza by von Würtzler (General Music Publication)
- Lullaby (Lyra Music, International Music Service)
- Menuet (Lyra Music, International Music Service)
- Modern Sketches (Southern Music Publication)
- Old Dance (Lyra Music, International Music Service)
- Puppet Dance (Lyra Music, International Music Service)
- Variations on a theme of Corelli (General Music Publication)
- Vivaldi, Antonio - von Würtzler: Concerto in D Major (General Music Publication)

=== Original works ===
- Canto Amoroso (F. C. Publishing Co.)
- Caprice de Concert (F. C. Publishing Co.)
- Little Tale (F. C. Publishing Co.)
- Meditation (Salvi International Corp.)
- Paraphrase on a Theme from Rigoletto (F. C. Publishing Co.)
- Tale for the Boys (Salvi International Corp.)
- Three Miniatures for Violin and Harp (Salvi International Corp.)
- Vivaldi, Antonio: Concerto (F. C. Publishing Co.)

=== Covers, transcripts ===
- Bach, Christian: Concerto „God Save the King”. Cadenza: von Würtzler (Salvi International Corp.)
- Bartók, Béla: Rumanian Folk Dances for Solo Harp (Salvi International Corp.)
- Bartók, Béla: Vol. II. for Solo Harp (Salvi International Corp.)
- Chinese folk song: Amid Flowers Beside the River Under the Spring (Salvi International Corp.)
- Franck, César: Agnus Dei for Solo Harp (F. C. Publishing Co.)
- Kodály, Zoltán: Gyermektáncok (Salvi International Corp.)
- Kodály, Zoltán: Intermezzo from Háry János (Salvi International Corp.)
- Kodály, Zoltán: Székely nóta, Hungarian Songs (3) (Magyar parasztdalok)
- Landscape in Sunset. Original work from China, edited by von Würtzler. (Salvi International Corp.)
- Marcello, Benedetto: Adagio for Solo Harp (F. C. Publishing Co.)
- Noon. Edited by von Würtzler (Salvi International Corp.)
- The Cherry Blossoms. Original work from China, edited by von Würtzler. (Salvi International Corp.)
- The Voice of Youth. Original work from China, edited by von Würtzler. (Salvi International Corp.)
- Vivaldi, Antonio: D Major Concerto PVW 209 with Cadenza (F. C. Publishing Co.)
- Vivaldi, Antonio: Largo from Concerto in D Major PVW 209 (F. C. Publishing Co.)
- XVIII Century Hungarian Dances (Salvi International Corp.)

=== Invitations ===
- Bernstein, Leonard (USA): Chorale and Meditation
- Chiti, Gianopaulo (Italy): Breakers
- Creston, Paul (USA): Olympia Rhapsody for Harp
- Damase, Jean-Michel (France): Concertino
- Dello Joio, Norman (USA): Bagatella
- Durkó Zsolt (Hungary): Serenata Per Quatro Arpas
- Flagello, Nicolas (USA): Arismo II. for 4 Harps, Island of Mysterious Bells
- Hanuš, Jan (Czechoslovakia): Introduzione E Toccata
- Hidas Frigyes (Hungary): Hungarian Melodies
- Hovhaness, Alari (USA) - Stuart Colidge: Spirituals in Sunshine and Shadow
- Kasilag, Lucrecia R. (Philippines): Diversions II for 4 Harps
- Ligeti György (Hungary/Germany): Continuum
- Maayani, Ami (Israel): Arabesque for 4 Harps
- Mchedelov, Mikhail (Soviet Union): Song Procession for 4 Harps and Drum
- Montori, Sergio (Italy): Iron Garden
- Saygun, Ahmed Adnan (Turkey): Three Preludes for Four Harps, Three Melodies for Four Harps
- Serly Tibor (Hungary/USA): Canonic Prelude for 4 Harps
- Takemitsu, Toru (Japan): Wavelength
- Wha, Lin (China): Amid Flowers Beside the River
- Wiłkomirski, Josef (Poland): Concerto for Four Harps

== Records ==
- Vivaldi: Concerto (with New York Philharmonic, conductor: Leonard Bernstein, Columbia)
- New York Harps Ensemble/CRS 4130 Golden Crest Quadrophonic
- New York Harp Ensemble/CRS 4121 Golden Crest Quadrophonic
- 18th Century Concerti and Strings, Musical Heritage Society 3320
- 18th Century Concerti Stereo Cassette MHC 5320
- XVIII Century Music for Harp Ensemble MHS 3239
- XVIII Century Stereo Cassette MHC 5239
- Contemporary Music for Harp Ensemble MHS 1184
- Contemporary Stereo Cassette MHC 2100
- Contemporary Music for Harp and Strings MHS 3370 (Solo: von Würtzler)
- American Cavalcade MHS 3307
- Romantic Music for Harp Ens. and Solo Harp MHS 3611 (Solo: von Würtzler)
- Romantic Music Stereo Cassette MHC 5611
- Musical Memories, Vol. I. MHS 3670
- Musical Memories, Vol. I. Stereo Cassette MHC 5670
- Christmas with New York Harp Ensemble MHS 3483 (Solo: von Würtzler)
- Christmas with New York Harp Ensemble Stereo Cassette MHC 5483
- An Evening with the New York Harp Ensemble MHS 3890 (Solo: von Würtzler)
- Musical Memories Vol. II. MHS 4259 (Solo: von Würtzler)
- Musical Memories, Vol. II. Stereo Cassette MHC 6259 (Solo: von Würtzler)
- Rhapsody for Harp and Orchestra, MHS 4387 (Solo: von Würtzler)
- Mostly Concertos, MHS 4260 (Solo: von Würtzler)
- The New York Harp Ensemble, Hungaroton SLPX 12726
- The New York Harp Ensemble, Hungaroton, MK 12726
- The New York Harp Ensemble, Hungaroton Stereo HCD 12726
- A Pastorale Christmas, MusicMasters, MMD 20098A
- A Pastorale Christmas, MusicMasters Stereo Cassette, MMC 40098Z
- A Pastorale Christmas, MusicMasters Compact Disc. CD MMD 60098Y
- A Pastorale Christmas with NYH Ensemble MHS 4610 Digital-Stereo
- A Pastorale Christmas with NYH Ensemble Digital-Stereo Cassette 6611
- Weinachtiiche Harfenmusik NYHE and Pro Arte Chamber Orchestra, conductor: Aristid von Würtzler, Orfeo, Stereo-Digital-S 122 841 B
- Éva Marton with the New York Ensemble, Hungaroton SLPD 12939
- Éva Marton with the New York Harp Ensemble, Hungaroton MK 12939
- Éva Marton with the New York Harp Ensemble, Hungaroton HDC 12939
- Hungaroton Highlights, 1987–88, Hungaroton, HCD 1661

== Awards ==
- London College of Applied Science (USA), honorary doctorate, 1968
- Order of Merit of the Republic of Hungary

== Bibliography ==
- Előd Juhász - István Kaposi Kis: Beszélő hárfa. Aristid von Würtzler. Idegenforgalmi Propaganda és Kiadó Vállalat, Budapest, 1990.
