= List of compositions by Péter Eötvös =

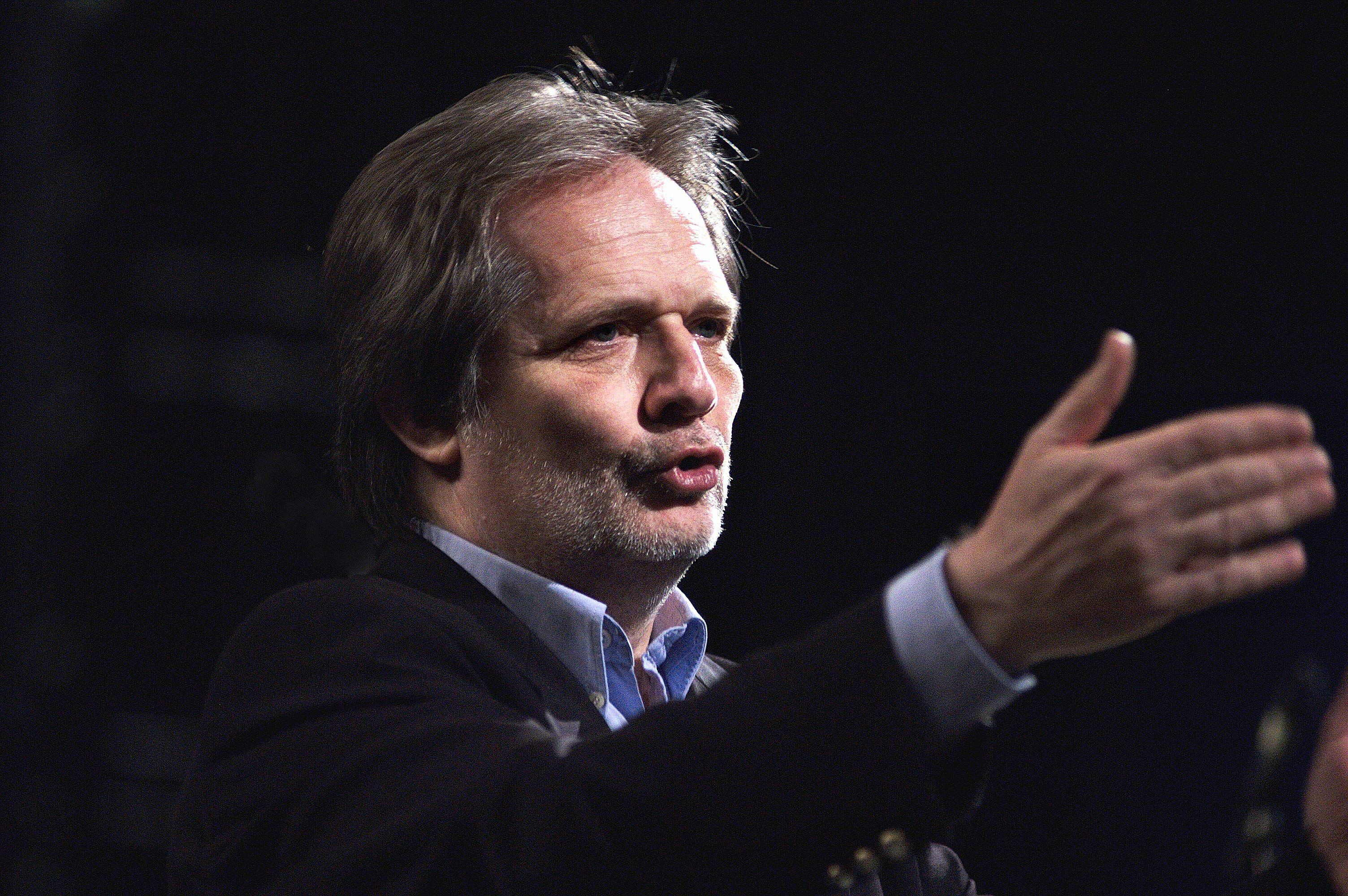
Péter Eötvös by Istvan Huszti

The following is a list of compositions by the Hungarian composer, conductor and academic teacher Péter Eötvös. Music by Eötvös was published by Durand, Editio Musica Budapest, Ricordi and especially by Schott.

== Stage works ==
- Harakiri, opera (1973)
- Radames, chamber opera (1975/97)
- Three Sisters, opera (1996–97)
- As I Crossed a Bridge of Dreams, opera (1998–99)
- Le Balcon, opera (2001/02)
- Angels in America, opera (2002–2004)
- Lady Sarashina, opera (4 March 2008, Opéra de Lyon)
- Love and Other Demons, opera (10 August 2008, Glyndebourne Festival)
- The Tragedy of the Devil (Die Tragödie des Teufels), opera (22 February 2010, Bavarian State Opera)
- Paradise Reloaded (Lilith) (2012/13)
- Der goldene Drache, opera (2013/2014, for Ensemble Modern)
- Senza sangue, opera (2015 Cologne, 2016 Festival d'Avignon)
- Sleepless, opera (2021 Berlin State Opera, 2022 Grand Théâtre de Genève, 2024 Graz Opera)
- Valuska, opera (2023 Hungarian State Opera, 2024 Theater Regensburg)

== Orchestra works ==
- Chinese Opera (1986)
- Psychokosmos, Zymbalon Concerto (1993)
- Atlantis, for solo baritone, boy soprano, zymbalom, virtual choir and orchestra (1995)
- Replica, Viola Concerto (1998) – recorded by Kim Kashkashian on ECM Records
- Two monologues, for baritone and orchestra (1998)
- zeroPoints (1999)
- IMA, for soloists, choir and orchestra (2002)
- Jet Stream, Trumpet Concerto (2002)
- CAP-KO, concerto for piano, keyboard and orchestra (2005)
- Seven, Violin Concerto No. 1 (2006)
- Konzert für zwei Klaviere (2007)
- Levitation, for two clarinets and string orchestra (2007)
- Cello Concerto Grosso, for cello and orchestra (2010–11)
- The gliding of the eagle in the skies (2011)
- DoReMi, Violin Concerto No. 2 (2012)
- Speaking drums, Percussion Concerto (2012–13)
- Hommage à Domenico Scarlatti, for horn soloist and string chamber orchestra (2013)
- Halleluja – Oratorium balbulum, four fragments for mezzo-soprano and tenor solo, narrator, choir and orchestra (2015)
- Dialog mit Mozart (2016)
- Alla vittime senza nome (2017)
- Multiversum, for organ, Hammond organ and orchestra (2017)
- Reading Malevich (2017–18)
- Per Luciano Berio (2018)
- Alhambra, Violin Concerto No. 3 (2018)

== Ensemble works ==
- Windsequenzen (1975/1987)
- Intervalles-Interieurs, ensemble and electronics (1981)
- Windsequenzen, for ensemble (1975/1987)
- Steine, for ensemble (1985–90)
- Brass – The Metal Space, actions for 7 brass players and 2 percussionists without conductor (1990)
- Triangel, for percussionist and ensemble (1993)
- Psy, first version for harp, alto flute/piccolo and viola; second for harp, alto flute/piccolo and violoncello (1996)
- Shadows, for flute, clarinet and ensemble (1996)
- Paris–Dakar, for trombone solo, brass and percussion (2000)
- Snatches of a conversation, for double-bell trumpet solo and ensemble (2001)
- Sonata per sei, for two pianos, three percussion and one sampler keyboard (2006)
- Octet for flute, clarinet, 2 bassoons, 2 trumpets, 2 trombones (2008)
- Dodici, for 12 cellos (2013)
- da capo (Mit Fragmenten aus W. A. Mozarts Fragmenten), for cimbalon or marimba and ensemble (2014)
- Secret kiss, melodrama for narrator and 5 instruments (2018)

== Vocal music ==
- Solitude / Egyedül, for children or women's choir, in memoriam Kodály (1956/2006)
- Drei Madrigalkomödien, for 12 voices:

- "Moro Lasso" (1963–72)
- "Hochzeitsmadrigal" (1963–76)
- "Insetti galanti" (1970–90)

- Octet Plus, for soprano, flute, clarinet, 2 bassoons, 2 trumpets, 2 trombones (2008)
- Schiller, energische Schönheit, for 8 singers, 8 wind instruments, 2 percussion and accordion (2010)
- Herbsttag, for female choir (2011)
- Die lange Reise, for soprano and piano (2014)
- Goretsch! Goretsch!, for mezzo-soprano solo (2017)

== Chamber music and solo works ==
- 5 Klavierstücke, piano solo (1959/60/61)
- Kosmos, solo or two pianos (1961/99)
- Korrespondenz, for string quartet (1992)
- Thunder, solo timpani (1993)
- Psalm 151, for percussion (1993)
- Derwischtanz, for 1 or 3 clarinets (1993/2001)
- Zwei Promenaden, percussion, keyboard and tuba (1993/2001)
- Two poems to Polly, solo cello (1998)
- Erdenklavier-Himmelklavier nr. 1., piano solo (2003)
- Erdenklavier-Himmelklavier nr. 2., piano solo (2003/2006)
- Un taxi l´attend, mais Tchékhov préfère aller à pied., piano solo (2004)
- Encore, string quartet (2005)
- Natasha, soprano, violin, clarinet and piano (2006)
- Cadenza, flute solo (2008)
- Dances of the Brush-footed Butterfly, piano solo (2012)
- New Psalm, percussion solo (2012/13)
- Lectures différentes, saxophone quartet (2014)
- a Call, violin solo (2015)
- O rose!, piano solo (2015)
- para Paloma, violin solo (2015)
- Molto Tranquillo, trio for piccolo doubling alto-flute, cello and piano (2015)
- The sirens cycle, soprano and string quartet (2015/16)
- "Now, Miss!", for violin and cello, based on Samuel Beckett's "Embers" (2016)
- Sentimental, for trumpet in E-flat doubling flugelhorn (2017)
- Joyce, for clarinet and string quartet (2017)
- Joyce, for clarinet solo (2018)
- désaccord 2, for 2 violas, in memoriam B.A. Zimmermann (2018)
- Lisztomania, for piano four hands (2018)

== Electronic music ==
- Mese (Märchen /Tale/Conte), tape (1968)
- Cricketmusic, tape (1970)
- Music for New York (1971)
- "Now, Miss!" violin, synthesizer with tape (1972)
- Elektrochronik, tape (1974)
- Psy, tape (1996)

== Incidental music and film music ==
- Sean O'Casey: Az ezüst kupa – The Silver Tassie (1961)
- Büchner: Leonce és Léna – Leonce and Lena (1961)
- Károly Esztergályos: Ötödik pozicióban – In fifth position (1962)
- Pál Gábor: A megérkezés – The Arrival (1962)
- Pál Gábor: Prometeusz – Prometheus (1962)
- János Rózsa: Tér – Space (1962)
- István Bácskay-Lauro: Igézet – Spell (1963)
- Zoltán Fábri: Nappali sötétség – Darkness at noon (1963)
- Pál Gábor: Aranykor – Golden Age (1963)
- O'Neill: Amerikai Elektra – Mourning becomes Electra (1963)
- Tennessee Williams: Üvegfigurák- The Glass Menagerie (1963)
- Twist Oliver – Oliver Twist (1963)
- Iván Lakatos: Mozaik – Mosaic (1964)
- István Szabó: (1964)
- Pirandello: Hat szerep keres egy szerzöt – Six characters in search of an author (1964)
- Lermontov: Hóvihar – The Storm (1964)
- Madách: Az ember tragédiája – Tragedy of Man (1964)
- Anouilh: Becket (1965)
- Ellopott bejárat – Stolen Entrance (1965)
- Hét szem mazsola – Seven Raisins (1965)
- Gábor Oláh: Három kivánság (1965)
- János Szücs: Szomjuság – Thirst (1965)
- Foltos és Fülenagy – Spotty and Bigears (1966)
- Katona: Bánk bán (1968)
- Shakespeare: Athéni Timon – Timon of Athens (1969)
- Shakespeare: Téli rege – The Winter´s Tale (1969)
- Zoltán Huszárik: Amerigo Tot (1969)
- János Tóth: Aréna – Arena (1969)
- Ferenc Kardos: Egy örült éjszaka – A Crazy Night (1969)
- Mihály Szemes: Az alvilág professzora – The professor of inferno (1969)
- Károly Makk: Macskajáték – Cat´s play (1974)
- Sándor Sára: Tüske a köröm alatt – Thorn under the Nail (1987)
- Judit Elek: Tutajosok - Memories of a River (1990)
- Sándor Sára: Könyörtelen idök – Relentless Times (1991)

== Portrait-film and documentary film ==
- The seventh door
- En souvenir de Trois Soeurs
- Talentum
- Trois Soeurs – opera film
- Le Balcon – opera film
- Angels in America – opera film

== Withdrawn compositions ==
- Endless Eight I. for ensemble (1981)
- Pierre Idyll (1984)
- Endless Eight II. for ensemble – Apeiron musikon (1988–89)
- Der Blick, tape (1997)
- 600 Impulse (2000)
- désaccord – pour deux altos (2001)
