= New York Harp Ensemble =

New York Harp Ensemble (NYHE), classical music ensemble founded by Aristid von Würtzler and his wife, Barbara Pniewska harpists. It has been operating between 1969 and 1997.

== Background ==
Aristid von Würtzler emigrated from Hungary into the United States in 1956. Initially, he played in orchestras (e.g. between 1958 and 1961 in the New York Philharmonic Orchestra), then he began his solo career. After a while he noticed that as a male performer he could not break into television in America. So he decided to establish his own harp ensemble that can display more spectacular and colorful shows. He took Mireille Flour's Belgian band as an example though tried to learn from their rapid fall which was due to the constant rivalry between the harpists.

He met his future wife in Geneva during a harp contest in 1969. The young and reclusive artist in the bud represented Poland. After the contest Würtzler offered the girl a scholarship in University of Hartford, where he was himself a professor. Barbara also came from a musical family, his father was a renowned violist in Warsaw. She started piano at six then switched to harp, and in 1964 graduated from the Academy of Music in Warsaw in the harp department.

== History ==
The group worked for 28 years. They gave thousands of concerts in more than 60 countries worldwide, and made several television, radio and LP/CD recordings. In addition to the couple the harp ensemble featured two additional members who changed with time. Over the decades they played with Sandra Bittermann, Pattee Cohen, Coleen Cooney, Elizabeth Etters, Rebecca Flannery, Monika Jarecki, Eva Jaslar, Sylvia Kowalczuk, Dagmar Platilova and Dorell Maiorescu. Some of them after leaving the band became renowned harpists and professors of the harp.

The International Association of Harpists and Friends of the Harp was founded by Pierre Jamet French professor and virtuoso in 1962 and the Israeli government organized the first International Harp Competition in the same year. Würtzler became an active member of the American harp community and served as a member of the Jury at the Harp Contests.

The group made their own compositions and transcriptions, as well as by calling upon famous composers (Leonard Bernstein, Karlheinz Stockhausen) to write pieces for harp. Special emphasis was placed on Polish and Hungarian authors' works (Franz Liszt, Béla Bartók, Zoltán Kodály, György Ligeti, Zsolt Durkó, Frigyes Hidas, Tibor Serly) and also those of the host countries. The NYHE's repertoire consisted of almost two hundred pieces from baroque style through romantic to modern melody (Marcel Tournier, Carlos Salzedo, Marcel Grandjany). Würtzler paid great attention to meet the needs of the audience, therefore always maintained three complete programs, from which the host could choose the most suitable one. What is more, besides playing classical music pieces, they were among the first to stage a spectacular crossover-style show. In one of their scherzo they played as campaigners in canvasser hats. In another they presented a tipsy bar scene with jazz music. In a third one Liszt Hungarian Rhapsody No. 2 was performed in the characteristic style of several nations, like making an imaginary journey, every minute alternating between the styles of music. (Würtzler was a man with a great sense of humor; he often called his group "my harem", even in public interviews.)

The group was invited to the White House by presidents Jimmy Carter, Ronald Reagan, George H. W. Bush and Bill Clinton and played there five times. They were also invited to perform for Pope John Paul II at the Vatican City in 1985. They visited the Bogotá presidential palace in 1977 and went to Honduras and the Philippines in 1979.

From the second half of the eighties they regularly returned to Hungary. The band toured in Szombathely, Sopron and Kőszeg in 1988, and later gave a very successful concert at the Budapest Congress Center. In 1985 Hungaroton released their Baroque recording which was made earlier in New York, and then they made further recordings, sometimes with other harpists, e.g. Éva Marton.

Many times they played in conditions, such as in South America, where due to high humidity the harps sounded very strange. They toured in many countries and shared their experiences with other harpists and harp makers.

Würtzler tried to create circumstances to ensure the success of the band (program, costume, advertising and media). However, he admitted that Barbara took a big part from the beginning in organizing, and some of the transcripts were her work. Therefore, she played an equal role with her husband in the life of the band, although from behind the scenes.

The group disbanded in 1997 after Würtzler's death.

== Compositions for New York Harp Ensemble ==
- Bernstein, Leonard (USA): Chorale and Meditation
- Chiti, Gianopaulo (Italy): Breakers
- Creston, Paul (USA): Olympia Rhapsody for Harp
- Damase, Jean-Michel (France): Concertino
- Dello Joio, Norman (USA): Bagatella
- Durkó Zsolt (Hungary): Serenata Per Quatro Arpas
- Flagello, Nicolas (USA): Arismo II. for 4 Harps, Island of Mysterious Bells
- Hanus, Jan (Czechoslovakia): Introduzione E Toccata
- Hidas Frigyes (Hungary): Hungarian Melodies
- Hovhaness, Alan (USA) – Stuart Colidge: Spirituals in Sunshine and Shadow
- Kasilag, Lucrecia R. (Philippines): Diversions II for 4 Harps
- Ligeti György (Hungary/Germany): Continuum
- Maayani, Ami (Israel): Arabesque for 4 Harps
- Mchedelov, Mikhail (Soviet Union): Song Procession for 4 Harps and Drum
- Montori, Sergio (Italy): Iron Garden”
- Saygun, Ahmed Adnan (Turkey): Three Preludes for Four Harps, Three Melodies for Four Harps
- Serly Tibor (Hungary/USA): Canonic Prelude for 4 Harps
- Takemitsu, Toru (Japan): Wavelength
- Wha, Lin (China): Amid Flowers Beside the River
- Wiłkomirski, Josef (Poland): Concerto for Four Harps

== Records ==
- New York Harps Ensemble/CRS 4130 Golden Crest Quadrophonic
- New York Harp Ensemble/CRS 4121 Golden Crest Quadrophonic
- 18th Century Concerti and Strings, Musical Heritage Society 3320
- 18th Century Concerti Stereo Cassette MHC 5320
- XVIII Century Music for Harp Ensemble MHS 3239
- XVIII Century Stereo Cassette MHC 5239
- Contemporary Music for Harp Ensemble MHS 1184
- Contemporary Stereo Cassette MHC 2100
- Contemporary Music for Harp and Strings MHS 3370 (Solo: von Würtzler)
- American Cavalcade MHS 3307
- Romantic Music for Harp Ens. and Solo Harp MHS 3611 (Solo: von Würtzler)
- Romantic Music Stereo Cassette MHC 5611
- Musical Memories, Vol. I. MHS 3670
- Musical Memories, Vol. I. Stereo Cassette MHC 5670
- Christmas with New York Harp Ensemble MHS 3483 (Solo: von Würtzler)
- Christmas with New York Harp Ensemble Stereo Cassette MHC 5483
- An Evening with the New York Harp Ensemble MHS 3890 (Solo: von Würtzler)
- Musical Memories Vol. II. MHS 4259 (Solo: von Würtzler)
- Musical Memories, Vol. II. Stereo Cassette MHC 6259 (Solo: von Würtzler)
- Rhapsody for Harp and Orchestra, MHS 4387 (Solo: von Würtzler)
- Mostly Concertos, MHS 4260 (Solo: von Würtzler)
- The New York Harp Ensemble, Hungaroton SLPX 12726
- The New York Harp Ensemble, Hungaroton, MK 12726
- The New York Harp Ensemble, Hungaroton Stereo HCD 12726
- A Pastorale Christmas, MusicMasters, MMD 20098A
- A Pastorale Christmas, MusicMasters Stereo Cassette, MMC 40098Z
- A Pastorale Christmas, MusicMasters Compact Disc. CD MMD 60098Y
- A Pastorale Christmas with NYH Ensemble MHS 4610 Digital-Stereo
- A Pastorale Christmas with NYH Ensemble Digital-Stereo Cassette 6611
- Weinachtiiche Harfenmusik NYHE and Pro Arte Chamber Orchestra, conductor: Aristid von Würtzler, Orfeo, Stereo-Digital-S 122 841 B
- Éva Marton with the New York Ensemble, Hungaroton SLPD 12939
- Éva Marton with the New York Harp Ensemble, Hungaroton MK 12939
- Éva Marton with the New York Harp Ensemble, Hungaroton HDC 12939
- Hungaroton Highlights, 1987–88, Hungaroton, HCD 1661

== Bibliography ==
- Előd Juhász – István Kaposi Kis: Beszélő hárfa. Aristid von Würtzler. Idegenforgalmi Propaganda és Kiadó Vállalat, Budapest, 1990.
