= List of Hungarian composers =

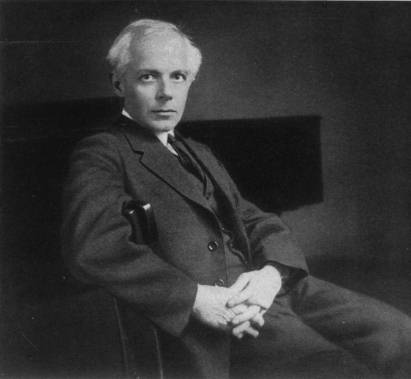
Bartók

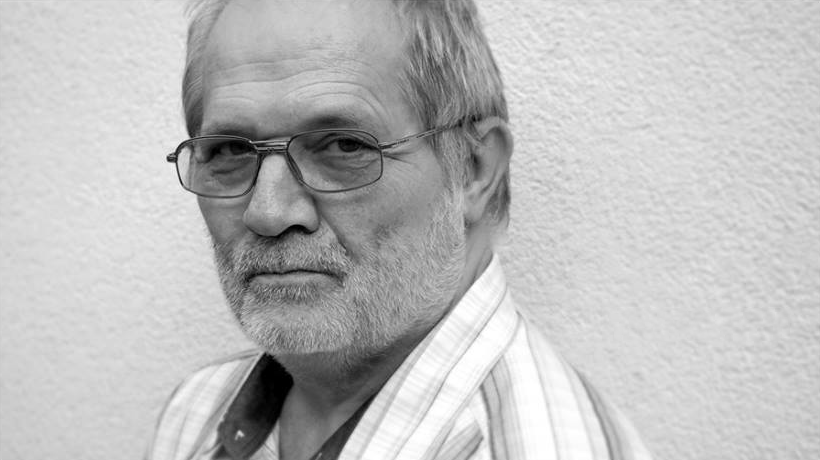
Péter Eötvös

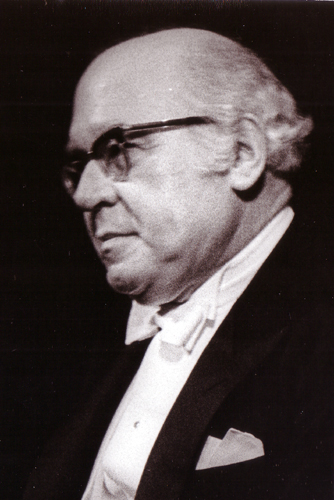
Ferenc Farkas

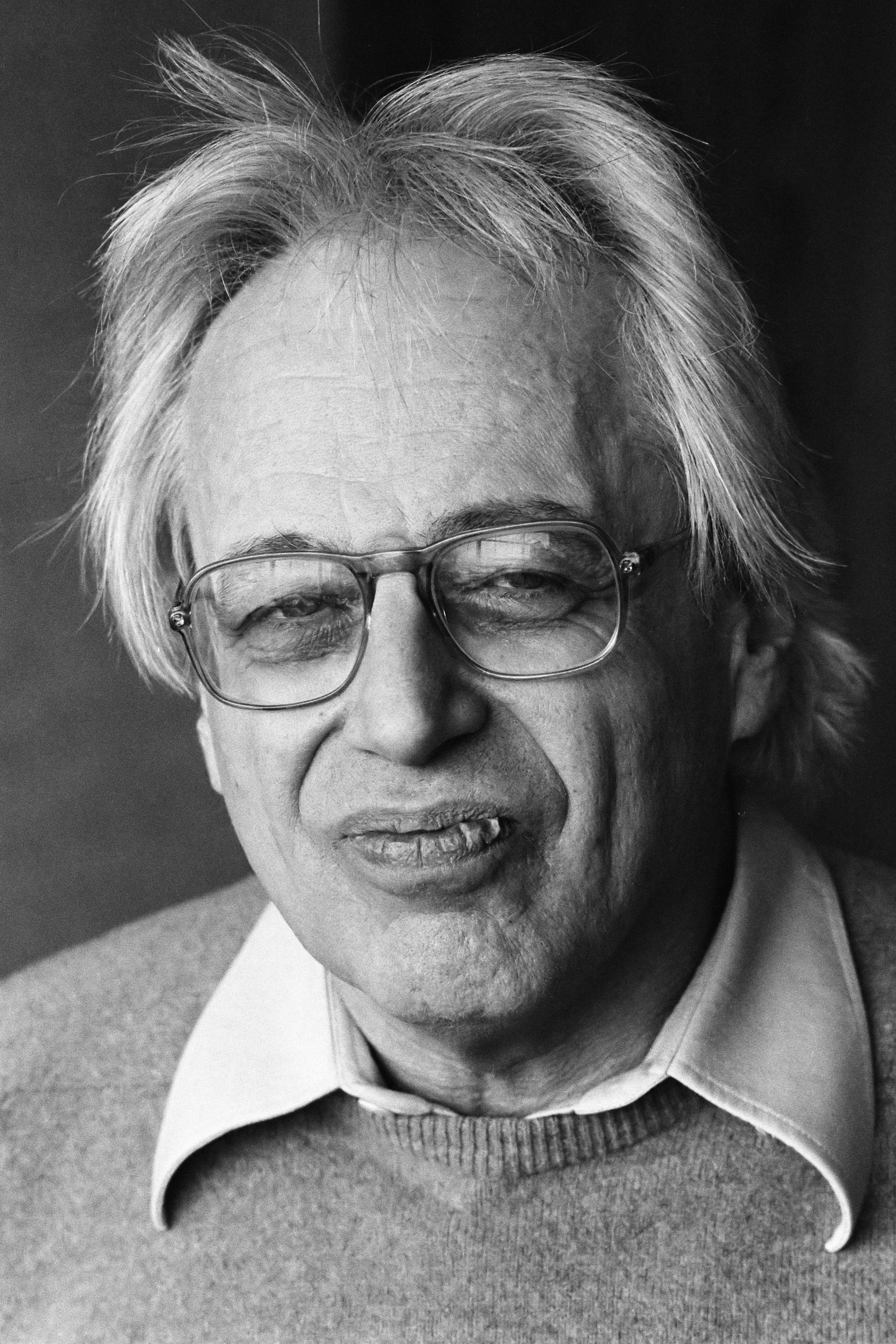
Ligeti

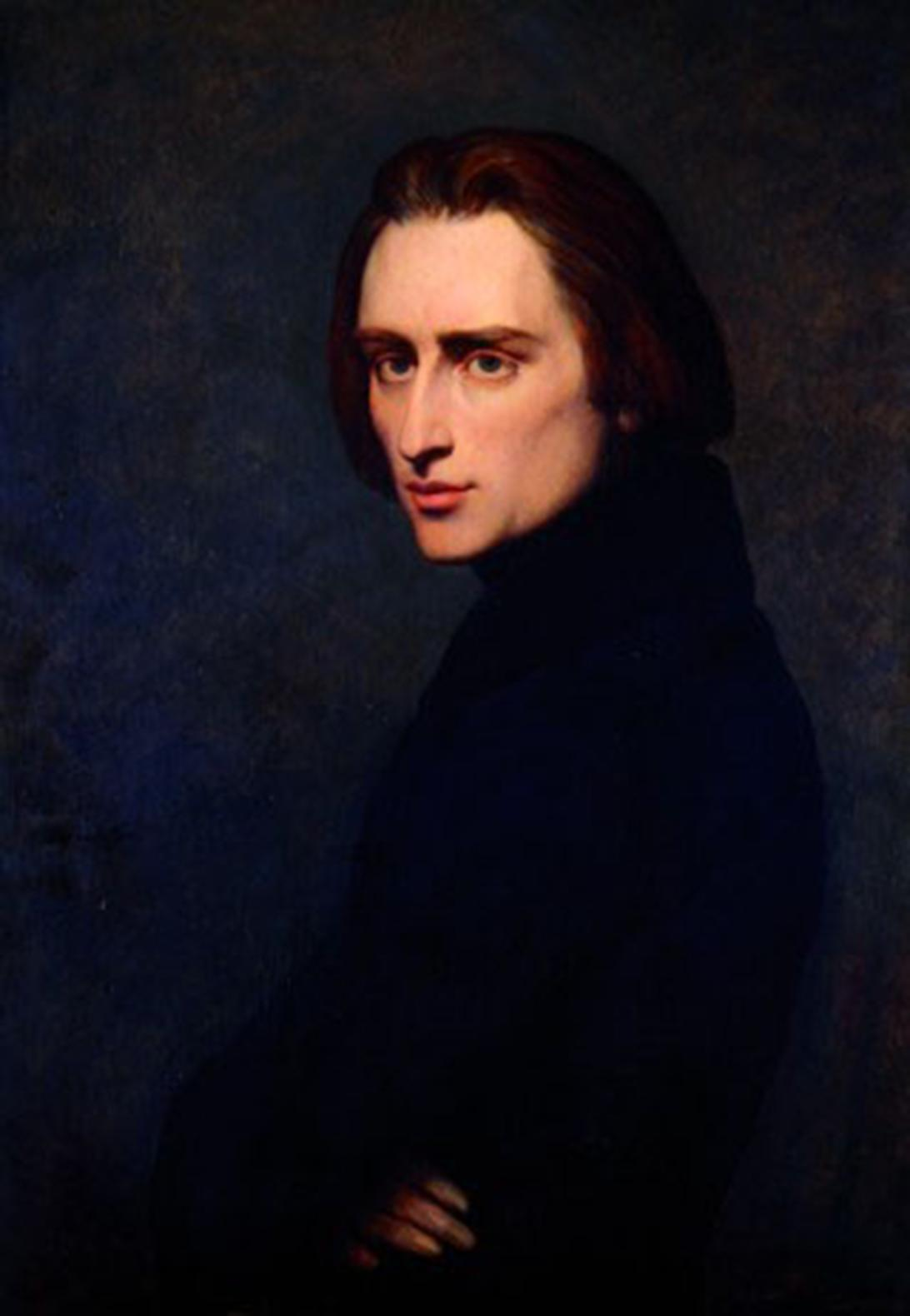
Liszt

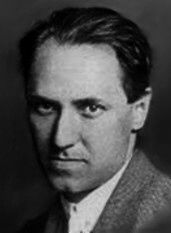
Leo Weiner

This is an alphabetical list of Hungarian composers.

== A ==
- Ábrányi, Kornél (1822–1903)
- Ádám, Jenő (1896–1982)
- Aggházy, Károly (1855–1918)

== B ==
- Bakfark, Bálint (1507–1576), also Valentin Bakfark, Bacfarc, Bakfarc, Bakfarkh, Bakffark, Backuart
- Balogh, Máté (born 1990)
- Bárdos, Lajos (1899–1986)
- Bartók, Béla (1881–1945)
- Bernáth, Ferenc (born 1981)

== C ==
- Cziffra, György (1921–1994), in French Georges Cziffra

== D ==
- Dohnányi, Ernő (1877–1960)
- Doppler, Ferenc (1821–1883), German Albert Franz Doppler
- Durkó, Zsolt (1934–1997)

== E ==
- Egressy, Béni (1814–1851), born Galambos Benjámin
- Eötvös, Péter (born 1944)
- Erkel, Ferenc (1810–1893)
- Esterházy, Pál (1635–1713), full name Paul I, Prince Esterházy of Galántha

== F ==
- Farkas, Ferenc (1905–2000)
- Fusz, János (1777–1819), German Johann Evangelist Fuss

== G ==
- Gárdonyi, Zoltán (1906–1986)
- Goldmark, Károly (1830–1915), German Karl Goldmark
- Gulya, Róbert (*1973)

== H ==
- Hidas, Frigyes (1928–2007)
- Horváth, Balázs (1976)
- Hubay, Jenő (1852–1937)
- Heller, Stephen (1813–1888)

== J ==
- Járdányi, Pál (1920-1966)
- Jeney, Zoltán (born 1943)
- Joachim, Joseph (1831–1907)

== K ==
- Kálmán, Emmerich (1882–1953)
- Kéler, Béla (1820–1882)
- Kocsár, Miklós (1933–2019)
- Kodály, Zoltán (1882–1967)
- Kozma, József (1905-1969), French Joseph Kosma
- Kurtág, György (born 1926)

== L ==
- Lajtha, László (1892–1963)
- Lehár, Ferenc (1870–1948), German Franz Lehár
- Ligeti, György (1923–2006)
- Liszt, Ferenc (1811–1886), German Franz Liszt

== M ==
- Márta, István (born 1962)
- Melis, László (1953–2018)
- Molnár, Antal (1890–1983)
- Moor, Emánuel (1863–1931)

== O ==
- Orbán, György (born 1947)

== R ==
- Ránki, György (1907–1992)
- Rózsa, Miklós (1907–1995)

== S ==
- Szántó, Theodor (1877–1934)
- Sárközy, István (1920–2002)
- Sáry, László (born 1940)
- Sugár, Miklós (born 1952)
- Szervánszky, Endre (1911–1977)
- Szokolay, Sándor (1931–2013)
- Szőllősy, András (1921–2007)
- Szőnyi, Erzsébet (1924–2019)

== T ==
- Takács, Jenő (1902–2005)
- Ticharich, Zdenka (1900–1979)
- Tinódi Lantos, Sebestyén (1510–1556)

== V ==
- Vajda, János (born 1949)
- Vecsey, Ferenc (1893–1935), German Franz von Vecsey, Italian Ferenc de Vecsey

== W ==
- Weiss, Josef (1864–1945)
- Weiner, Leó (1885–1960)
