= Jean Rigby =

English opera and concert singer

Jean Rigby (born 22 December 1954) is an English opera and concert singer. A mezzo-soprano, she is a long-time principal with the English National Opera.

== Biography ==
Born in Fleetwood, Lancashire, Rigby studied at the Birmingham School of Music and the Royal Academy of Music. She made her debut with the English National Opera in 1977. She has sung with the Royal Opera and has been for many years a regular guest at the Glyndebourne Festival. At the 2008 Glyndebourne festival, she created the role of Martina Laborde in Peter Eötvös' opera Love and Other Demons. In the field of concert music, she has been a frequent soloist at the BBC Proms. Her recordings include the role of Maddalena in the English-language RIGOLETTO (EMI/Angel), based on Jonathan Miller's "gangster" production for ENO. She is an opera coach at the Royal Academy of Music and a Patron of Bampton Classical Opera. She was a member of the jury for the company's Young Singers' Competition in 2019.
