= Aszód =

- Town
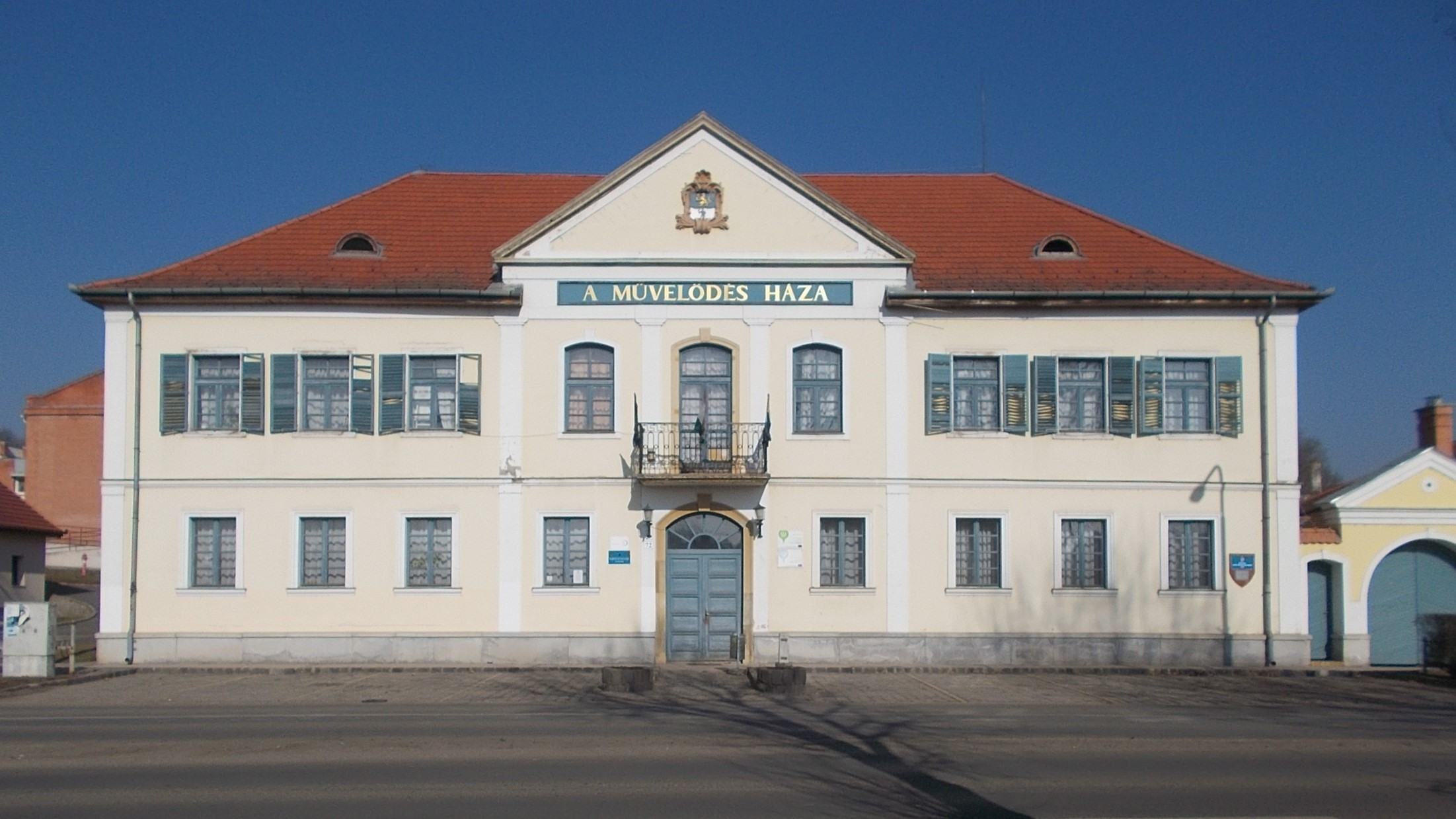
- Culture Center in Aszód

- Flag Coat of arms

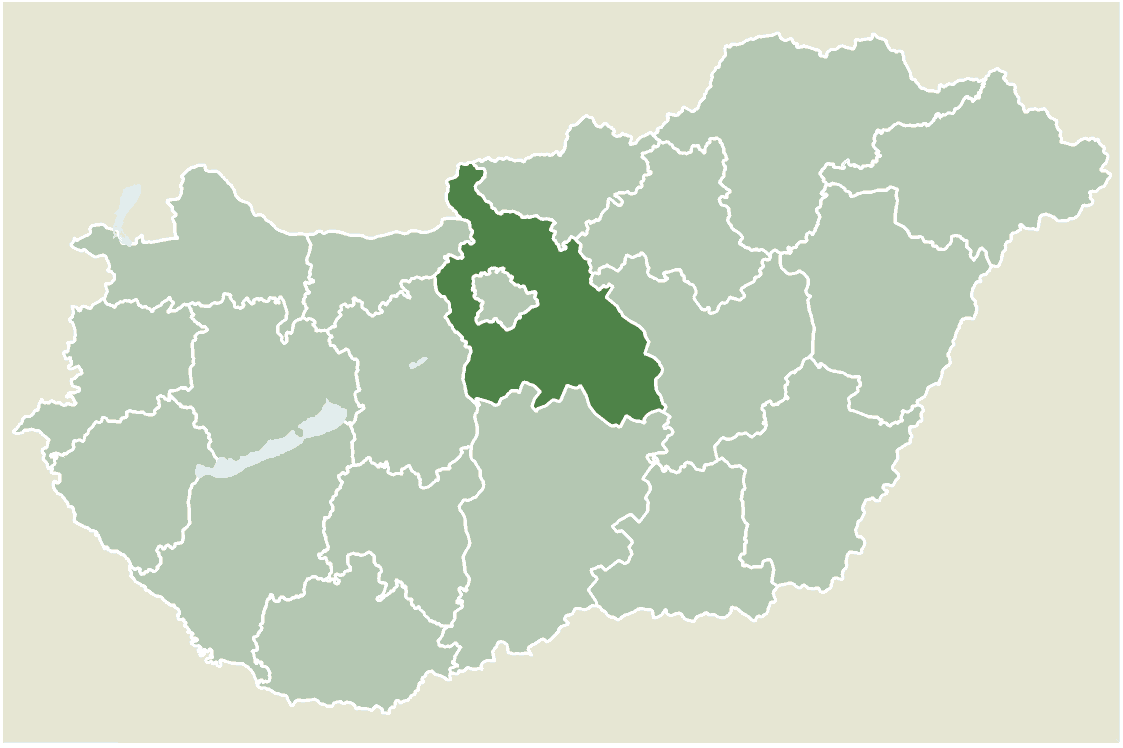
- Location of Pest county in Hungary

- Location of Aszód
- Coordinates: 47.65451°N 19.47998°E
- Country: Hungary
- County: Pest
- District: Aszód

Area
  - Total: 16.21 km^{2} (6.26 sq mi)

Population (2015)
  - Total: 6,162
  - Density: 380.1/km^{2} (984.5/sq mi)
- Time zone: UTC+1 (CET)
  - Summer (DST): UTC+2 (CEST)
- Postal code: 2170
- Area code: (+36) 28
- Website: aszod.hu

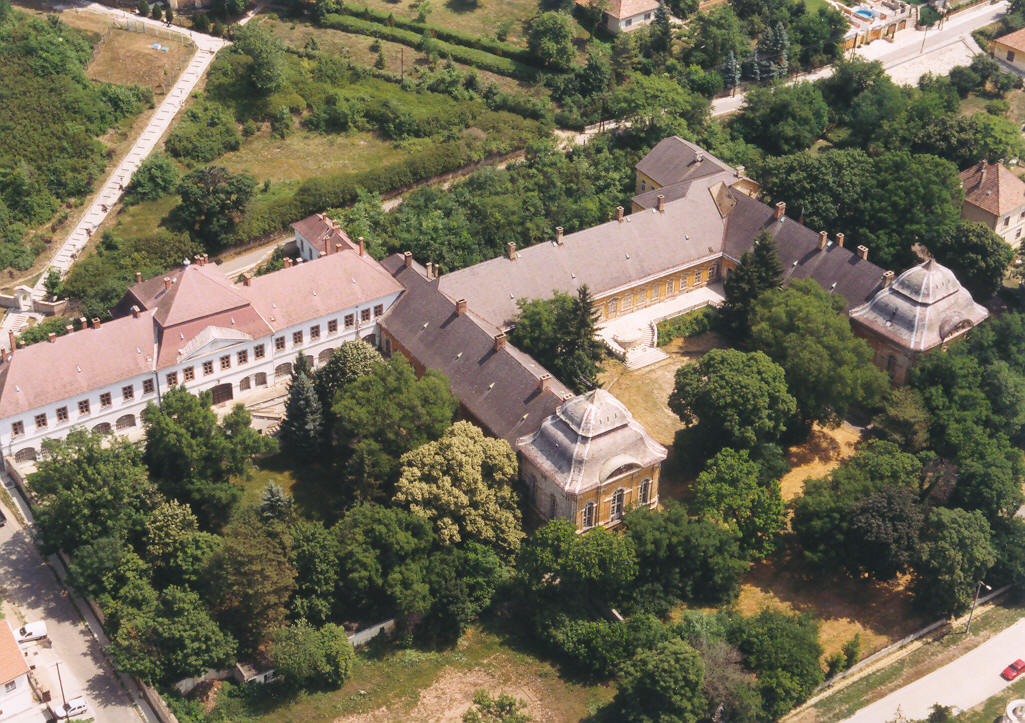
Podmanitzky family palace in Aszód.

Aszód (Hungarian pronunciation: [ˈɒsoːd]) is a town in Pest county, Hungary.

== History ==
During World War II, Aszód was captured on 7 December 1944 by Soviet troops of the 2nd Ukrainian Front in the course of the Budapest Offensive.

== Notable residents ==
- Sándor Petőfi, Hungarian national poet and liberal revolutionary
- Podmanitzky family, Hungarian noble family
- Aristid von Würtzler, Hungarian harpist, composer, leader of the New York Harp Ensemble
- József Jung, Hungarian architect
- Sándor Sára, Hungarian cinematographer and film director
- Zoltán Huszárik, Hungarian film director, screenwriter, visual artist and actor
- Ignaz Aurelius Fessler, Hungarian ecclesiastic, politician, historian and freemason
- Zoltán Varga, Hungarian footballer, Olympic gold medalist at the 1964 Summer Olympics in Tokyo, Japan
- Duchess Maria Dorothea of Württemberg, Silesian noble, wife of Archduke Joseph, Palatine of Hungary and sister of the great-grandfather of Edward VIII and George VI (father of Queen Elizabeth II), Kings of the United Kingdom
