= Vera Dulova =

Russian harpist and instructor (1909–2000)

- Вера Дулова
- Born: Vera Georgiyevna Dulova; January 27, 1909; Moscow, Russian Empire
- Died: January 5, 2000 (aged 90); Moscow, Russia
- Occupation: Harpist

Vera Georgiyevna Dulova (Note: Russian: Вера Георгиевна Дулова, romanized: Vera Georgiyevna Dulova) (born 27 January 1909 – 5 January 2000) was a Russian harpist and pedagogue. People's Artist of the USSR (1976).

== Biography ==
She was born in Moscow into a princely family, related to the Rurik Dynasty, the founders of the Tsardom of Russia. Her grandfather was devoted to the violin and her grandmother, Alexandra Urievna Zograf-Dulov studied the piano with Nikolai Rubinstein, who founded the Moscow Conservatory; then she became a favorite pupil of Tchaikovsky. The great master dedicated two of his piano works to Alexandra.

Vera's father Georgi Nikolaevich Dulov was a violinist, who served as second violinist of The Duke George of Mecklenburg-Strelitz's quartet between 1896 and 1901, then became an instructor and professor of violin at the Moscow Conservatory. Vera's mother, Maria Andreyevna Dulova (Bukovskaya) was a soprano singer, a soloist at the Mariinsky Theatre in Saint Petersburg. Her parents became ill with tuberculosis around 1900 and it ruined their artistic careers. The family moved into Moscow from Saint Petersburg at that time.

Dulova and his siblings received a high-level musical training. Initially she studied piano and cello, but she did not take a liking to these instruments. When she suggested to switch to the harp her parents took her to Ksenia Erdeli. She began her studies at the Moscow Conservatory in 1920, at first with Erdeli, and then was accepted for lessons with Maria Korchinska. She gave her first memorable concert at the age of 12; A. V. Lunacharsky, the People's Commissar of Education, invited her to perform a special concert at his home for several famous musicians of the day. The students of the Conservatory gave concerts often; and her earnings contributed to the family's livelihood that became harder by the wartime circumstances.

The young Dulova handled her success quite well. She worked constantly, practiced, concertized, went to concerts and museums and taught other children. In 1929, she received her diploma from the conservatory and got a scholarship for further study from the Fund to Aid Gifted Youth. She left Russia for Berlin and took advanced lessons from professor Max Saal.

After her return to the USSR, Vera Dulova went to work for the Bolshoi Theatre. She had been the harp soloist of the orchestra from 1934 to 1985. In the 1930s, she married the famous singer, Alexander Baturin (1904–1983).

In spite of her princely ancestry and her fame, Dulova did not emigrate from the Soviet Union and represented her homeland proudly abroad.

== Career ==
In 1935 she competed at the Second All-union competition of musician-performers, held in Leningrad, and divided the first prize with Maria Goralova.

After that she gave numerous concerts all over the Soviet Union – often together with her husband –, and became a well-known and popular artist. In 1942 during World War II, the Bolshoi artists were evacuated to Kuybyshev where she met and made friends with Dmitri Shostakovich. She had not stop playing, but meanwhile worked in the hospital as well, caring for the wounded from the battles around Stalingrad. In 1943, she returned to Moscow and resumed her busy harpist life.

In 1955 she was awarded the title of Honorable Polar Explorer when she organized an artistic tour to the station North Pole-4 to introduce their art to the workers of the polar stations and the locals.

She had been teaching at the Moscow Conservatory from 1943; she served there as Professor of harp from 1958. Among her students were E. A. Moskovitina, Natalija Sameyeva, Olga Ortenberg and other famous harpists. At least 30 of her pupils won first prize at competitions and festivals in the USSR and worldwide.

In 1946 two of her former students from the Ippolitov-Ivanov Music School, S. Maikov and A. Kaplyuk, - with Dulova's expert assistance -, created the first Russian harp.

In 1964 she had been a founding member of the All-Union Harp Society. In 1997 she was the chairperson of jury at the I. Moscow International Harp Competition.

After World War II, she was not allowed to leave the country; but later she traveled all over the world, gave numerous concerts overseas and judged at international competitions. On several occasions, she participated in arranging seminars on harp playing for master-classes at Hartford University (USA) with Aristid von Würtzler.

From the 1960s, Dulova-schools or Russian-schools were formed in the Netherlands, Spain, Germany, Hungary, Bulgaria, China, United States, Brazil, Venezuela and elsewhere; the students could acquire her special harp technique there. She visited these schools regularly and established master classes, too. Since then Russian harp playing style has been well known everywhere. From the Hungarian harpists Melinda Felletár and Anna Lelkes were her students in Moscow.

Vera Dulova's repertoire consisted of three hundred pieces; and she herself wrote many transcriptions and studies for harp. She was the author of the book “The art of harp playing” (Moscow 1973).

She had had numerous Soviet and foreign contemporary composer friends, e.g. Alexander Mosolov, Sergei Vasilenko, Lev Knipper, Yevgenia Golubeva, Paul Hindemith, Heitor Villa-Lobos, Benjamin Britten and André Jolivet. Shostakovich was an intimate and very close friend of hers.

Dulova died in Moscow.

== Awards and honours ==
- Honored Artist of the RSFSR (1947)
- Honoured Worker of the Arts Industry of the RSFSR (1951)
- Order of Friendship of Peoples (1955)
- People's Artist of the RSFSR (1966)
- USSR State Prize (1973)
- People's Artist of the USSR (5 May 1976)
- Order of Friendship (18 October 1995)
