= József Jung =

Hungarian architect

- Born: Josef Jung; 1 January 1734; Iglau, Habsburg Empire (today Jihlava, Czech Republic)
- Died: 22 August 1808; Pest, Habsburg Empire
- Occupation: Architect
- Buildings: Grassalkovich Mansion (Hatvan)

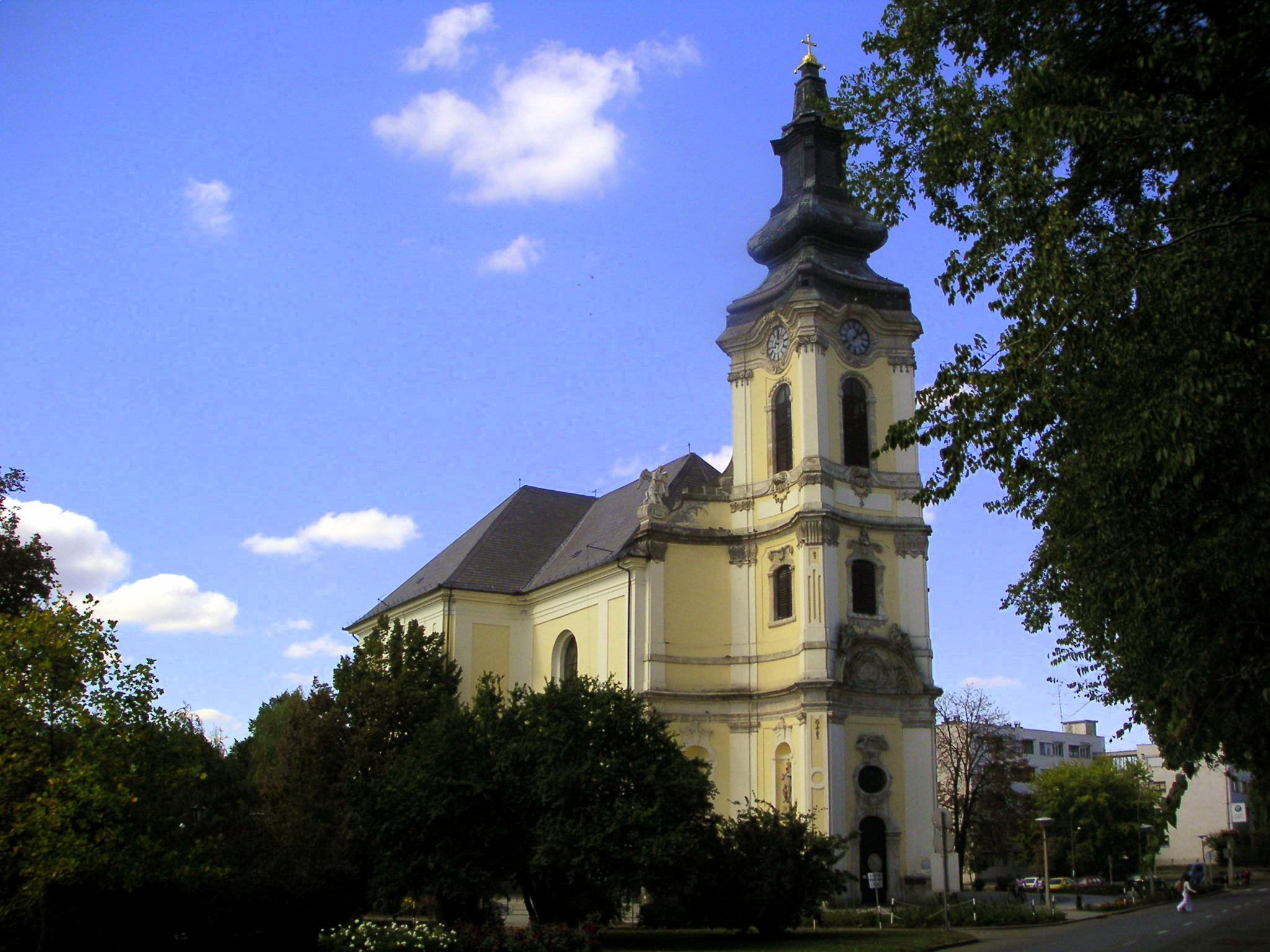
Jászberény church

József Jung (born as Josef Jung, 1734, Jihlava, Margraviate of Moravia – 22 August 1808, Pest) was a Hungarian-German architect.

== Life ==
Jung arrived in Hatvan in 1763 and began work for the Grassalkovich family, particularly for the rebuilding of the family castle. In 1767 he led the extensions of the Podmaniczky castle at Aszód. From 1773 he worked in Pest as well as the country, and among others, built the Gomba reformed church in 1774-6 and the Pest priest's college. Between 1774 and 1782 he rebuilt the Jászberény Roman Catholic church and between 1794 and 1801 his best known work, the Petofi square orthodox church in Pest. His son, Jozsef, was also a master builder working in the first half of the nineteenth century.

== See also ==
- Hungarian people of German descent
