= Grassalkovich Mansion (Hatvan) =

Coordinates: 47.6679°N 19.6833°E

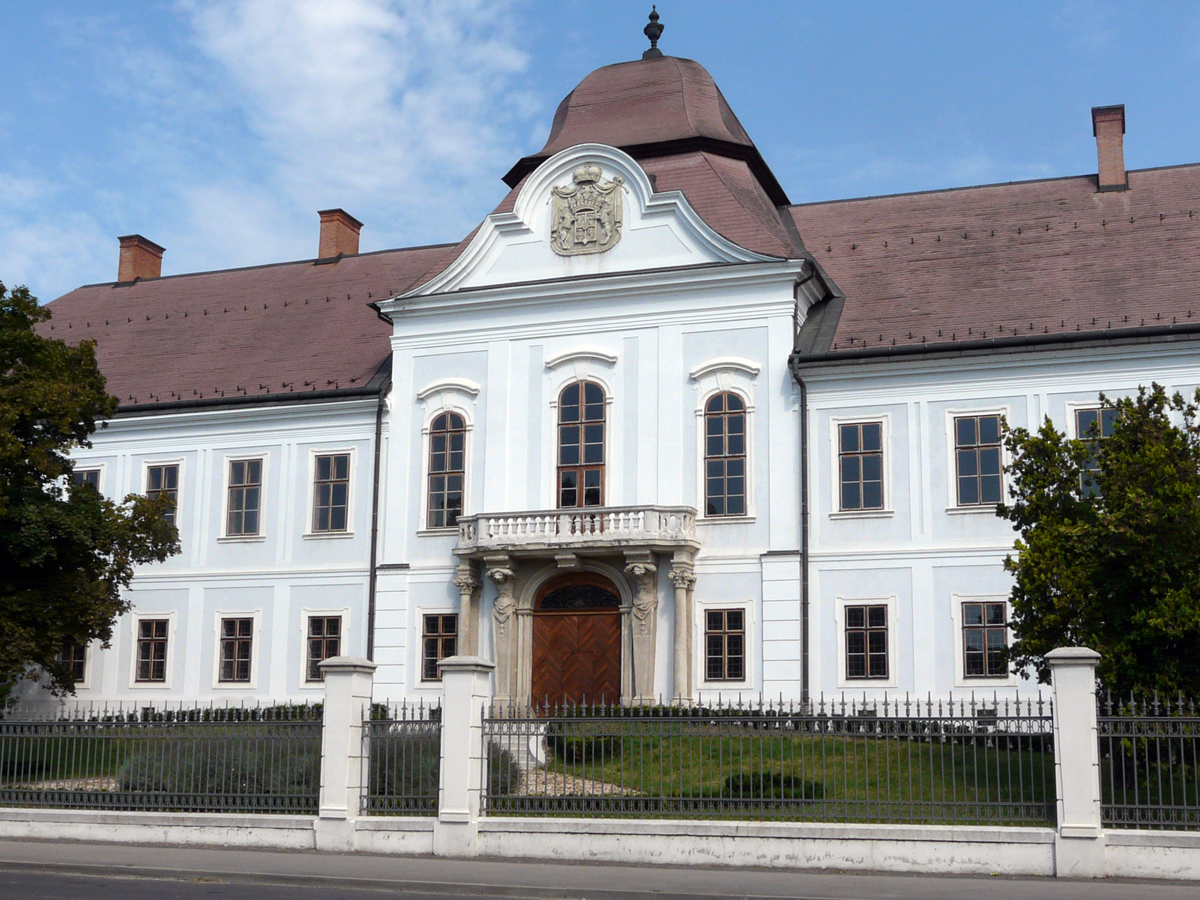
Frontage of the mansion with the main entrance

The Grassalkovich Mansion is a palace built by József Jung for the Grassalkovich family in Hatvan, a town in Heves County, Hungary. It lies in the centre of the city, right in front of the main square and the mayor’s office, which is also one of the oldest buildings. The area of this monument extends from the southern main entrance of the Roman Catholic church to the park of the Adalbert of Prague Parish.

The topographical number of the mansion is 2713/4, 3; it was declared a monument in accordance with the Ancient Monuments Act with the serial number of 9341.

== History ==
The town was invaded by Ferenc II Rákóczi in 1703, who forced its citizens to strengthen it in order to form it into a military center. By 1715, Hatvan was one of Heves County's six cities in which most members of the nobiles armales could be found. They were those soldiers and veterans who were given titles but never owned lands. In 1723, Count Gundaker Thomas Starhemberg became the Lord of Hatvan and its surrounding territories. The former Hatvan Castle was probably destroyed during this era. From 1746 to 1841, the city belonged to Antal Grassalkovich I and his family. He ordered the building of the present Grassalkovich Mansion and the parish in the mid-18th century.

Antal Grassalkovich I made several architects to build this so-called castle in two separate parts. In 1754, the central part was built by Ignác Oraschek, while others (including the balcony) were designed by András Mayerhoffer. Later, in 1763, two wings were added to the original building according to the plans of József Jung.

The central part and the eastern wing are located on the site of a former lodging house which was previously built at the beginning of the 18th century by Count Tamás Stahremberg Gundacker and was built with pieces of the former building. As well as using the above-mentioned pieces, the architects also used the ruins of the old Hatvan Castle.

The mansion was later owned by the Hatvany-Deutsch family. They added Neo-Baroque stuccoes, which can be seen in the stairway.

Most of the interior parts were destroyed, stolen and damaged by soldiers during the Second World War and the local citizens during the first couple of decades afterward. As a result, it was renovated and reconstructed a couple of times. The area of the former park was replaced by a students' hostel, a hospital and even a building estate. By the time it was declared endangered in 1979, only a few hundred square meters of the park were left.

After the renovation of the left wing, it became the home of the Grassalkovich House of Culture in the mid-1980s. Between 1996 and 2001, the posterior parts of the mansion were rebuilt and the roofing was replaced. In accordance with a 2012 decision, a hunting museum will soon to be added to the mansion which will represent the stock of game and fish species of historical Hungary. After the reconstruction is finished in 2014, visitors will be able to see the habitats of these species and also the development of hunting, fishing and forestry.
