= Of Love and Other Demons =

1995 novel by Gabriel García Márquez

- First edition (Colombia)
- Author: Gabriel García Márquez
- Original title: Del amor y otros demonios
- Translator: Edith Grossman
- Language: Spanish
- Publisher: Grupo Editorial Norma (Colombia); Alfred A. Knopf (US)
- Publication date: 1994
- Publication place: Colombia
- Pages: 147

Of Love and Other Demons (Spanish: Del amor y otros demonios) is a novel by Colombian author Gabriel García Márquez published in Spanish in 1994 and translated and published in English in 1995. Set in 18th-century Colombia, the plot follows the story of Sierva María, the 12-year-old daughter of a marquis who is bitten by a rabid dog. She does not seem to contract the disease but is delivered to a convent by her worried father. At the convent she is to be observed by a priest who becomes enthralled with her and her copper-color, floor-length hair. The book received largely positive reviews.

== Plot ==
In the prologue, García Márquez claims the novel is the fictional representation of a legend the author was told by his grandmother when he was a boy: of a 12-year-old marquise with long flowing hair who had died of rabies, and was believed to be a 'miracle-worker'. In this frame story, it was only after an excavation of tombs that García Márquez is witness to the grave of a similar young girl with 22-meter-hair still attached to the skull, that he was inspired to write Of Love and Other Demons.

The narrative takes place in the 18th century, in the Colombian port city Cartagena de Indias. Sierva María de Todos Los Angeles is the twelve-year-old daughter of the Marquis Ygnacio and his mestiza wife Bernarda. Her hair has never been cut, and was promised to the saints when she was born with the umbilical cord around her neck. Her parents mostly ignore their daughter, leaving the slaves to raise her. She is fluent in multiple African languages and calls herself by the African name "María Mandinga".

While walking in the city on her birthday, she is bitten by a rabid dog. Within a few months, an indigenous woman, Sagunta, warns the Marquis of an oncoming plague of rabies, and of the possibility that Sierva María may die from it. The doctor Abrenuncio, a Portuguese Jew who has escaped from the Inquisition to the Americas, tells Ygnacio that Sierva María is not in danger of being infected with rabies; nevertheless, Ygnacio subjects her to multiple torturous healing methods in an effort to save her. Ygnacio consults with the bishop, who convinces him that Sierva María is possessed by demons and must be exorcised. She is sent to the convent of Santa Clara, despite still showing no symptoms of rabies, to receive an exorcism, from which many people have died.

Sierva María is treated cruelly in the convent; her only friend is another prisoner, the nun Martina Laborde. The priest who is assigned with her exorcism, Father Cayetano Delaura, is kind to her and initially believes she does not need to be exorcised. Delaura falls in love with Sierva Maria, although she is still cold to him. The marquis asks Delaura to return his daughter to him; first, Delaura consults with Abrenuncio, then, he visits Sierva María, and is ultimately convinced that Sierva María is in fact not possessed by a demon. The bishop, for Delaura's disobedience, strips him of his position and sends him to serve in a leper hospital. He continues to visit Sierva María in secret, using a tunnel to access her room; he confesses his love to her. They eat, sleep, and recite poetry together; their relationship grows physical, but is not consummated. Sierva María is at last summoned to be exorcised; her hair is cut off. After the exorcism, another bishop promises to remove her from the convent, but dies before he can do so. Delaura and Sierva María continue to see each other until the tunnel is closed off after Martina successfully manages to escape the convent. Sierva María, tormented by exorcisms, loneliness, and hunger, eventually dies, never finding out where Delaura is. All the same, her hair continues to grow from her dead body.

== Analysis ==
The novel repeats a common theme found in the works of García Márquez of forbidden love, and of the transgression of societal rules that forbid the love. Of Love has been described as part of an "amorous triptych", with the other two novels being Chronicle of a Death Foretold and Love in the Time of Cholera. The novel's plot is influenced by Portuguese playwright Gil Vicente's Comédia de Rubena; the epigraph of Chronicle of a Death Foretold is also from Comédia de Rubena. Additionally, the poetry of Garcilaso de la Vega is referenced by Delaura throughout the story. Aníbal González argues that Of Love is a response to Plato's Symposium, where Sierva María's life is a retelling of Socrates' version of love.

Critics view the novel as a criticism of colonialism and of institutions such as the Catholic church. Raymond Leslie Williams connects Sierva María's name to her upbringing: rather than being connected to her father's noble heritage, she is connected to the African servants by way of being called "Sierva"(servant); Williams also states that Sierva María's status as slave despite being from a criollo family symbolizes the "larger, all-encompassing slavehood, servitude, and solitude in which many citizens of the Americas (in the fictional world of García Márquez) live". Gregory Utley argues that the church treats Sierva María as insane because of her links to African culture, and wishes to "cure" her of her African upbringing. Arnold M. Penuel argues that in Del Amor, the church causes the death of Sierva María, therefore, it is criticized by Márquez as no better than the bite of a rabid dog.

The bishop, Don Toribio, is used to represent the Catholic Church. His obese body represents the influence of the church; he lives in an ancient and decayed palace and has asthma attacks, representing the decay of the church. Penuel argues that Toribio's extra weight represents a Church that has more power than it should; additionally, he argues that Toribio, like the Church, oppresses and destroys, rather than serves, and is spiritually corrupt. Ultimately, the Church, in its effort to exorcise Sierva María of demons, creates the "Other Demons" mentioned in the title.

== Reception and influence ==
Of Love and Other Demons received mostly positive reviews. A.S. Byatt of the New York Times gave a positive review, writing that the novel was an "almost didactic, yet brilliantly moving, tour de force." The novel likewise received a positive review from Kirkus Reviews, which praised the characters, plot, and writing style. John Leonard praised the novella highly, but felt that the ending was rushed.

The novel has inspired a film, Of Love and Other Demons. In 2008, the opera Love and Other Demons, by Hungarian composer Péter Eötvös was premiered at the Glyndebourne Festival. Colombian-American singer Kali Uchis's second album, Sin Miedo (del Amor y Otros Demonios), is named after the novel.
