= Senza sangue =

- Opera by Péter Eötvös
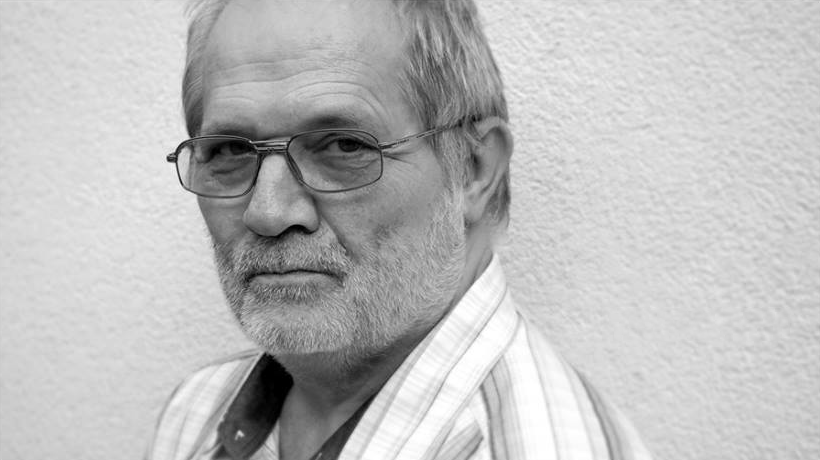
- The composer
- Translation: Without blood
- Librettist: Mari Mezei
- Based on: Senza sangue (2002) by Alessandro Baricco
- Premiere: 15 May 2016; Festival d'Avignon

Senza sangue (Without blood) is a one act opera and the fourth opera composed by Péter Eötvös. The opera's libretto was written by Mari Mezei, and is sung in Italian. It is based on the second part of the 2002 novel of the same name by Alessandro Baricco and is intended to be performed jointly with Béla Bartók's one-act Bluebeard's Castle. The concert première was given by the New York Philharmonic conducted by Alan Gilbert on 1 May 2015 at the Kölner Philharmonie. The stage premiere was on 15 May 2016 at the Festival d'Avignon. Anne Sofie von Otter, who sang in the work's première, said: "The piece is not at all easy for the two singers... [It's] hard to find the pitch; you have to work it into the voice, unless of course you happen to have perfect pitch, which I don't."

== Roles ==
Roles, voice types, premiere cast
Role	Voice type	Premiere cast, 1 May 2015, Cologne Conductor: Alan Gilbert
La Donna (Nina)	mezzo-soprano	Anne Sofie von Otter
L'Uomo (Pedro)	lyric baritone	Russell Braun

== Synopsis ==
The opera is set in the time of a civil war in an unnamed country. As a little girl, the Woman witnesses three soldiers kill her father and brother, but one of them, the Man, spares her life by not reporting he has seen her hiding. The opera opens years later, after two of the murderers have died in ways that suggest they might have been killed in revenge for their wartime actions, perhaps engineered by the Woman. Now middle-aged and wealthy, she recognizes an elderly man selling lottery tickets as the Man. He expects her to avenge her father's and brother's deaths, but they instead discuss the events of their lives "recalled through strained, cagey conversation" and Nina reveals that she was forcibly married at 14. The opera ends as they prepare to sleep together.

== Structure ==
The opera is divided into seven scenes, with an orchestral introduction and epilogue. The introduction is dedicated to Henri Dutilleux who died in 2013 as Eötvös was composing the work.
