= Love and Other Demons =

2008 opera by Péter Eötvös

- Opera by Péter Eötvös
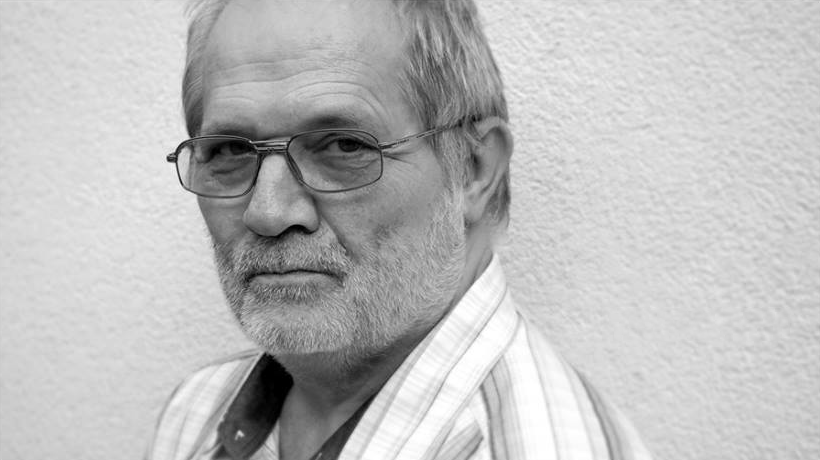
- Eötvös in 2018
- Librettist: Kornél Hamvai
- Language: English; Latin; Spanish; Yoruba
- Based on: Of Love and Other Demons by Gabriel García Márquez
- Premiere: 10 August 2008; Glyndebourne Festival

Love and Other Demons is an opera in two acts by Hungarian composer Péter Eötvös to a libretto by the Hungarian author Kornél Hamvai. It premiered on 10 August 2008 at the Glyndebourne Festival. The libretto is based on the novel Of Love and Other Demons (1994) by Gabriel García Márquez. The opera is the result of a commission by Glyndebourne and the BBC; it was broadcast in full on BBC Radio 3 on Saturday, 11 October 2008.

== Plot ==
Maria is living with her father who is not taking care of her. She prefers to be with the servants and slaves. She is bitten by a dog with rabies. She suffers no reaction; nevertheless, she is brought to a convent where Father Delaura is supposed to take care of her. He is supposed to exorcise her of demons but falls in love with her. As this is recognized she is removed from the convent and the bishop himself will exorcise her demons. She dies in the process.

== Roles ==
Role	Voice type	Premiere cast, 10 August 2008 Conductor: Vladimir Jurowski
Sierva Maria	soprano	Allison Bell
Don Ygnacio, a marquis and father of Maria	tenor	Robert Brubaker
Father Cayetano Delaura	baritone	Nathan Gunn
Abrenuncio, a doctor	tenor	John Graham-Hall
Don Toribio, the bishop	bass	Mats Almgren
Dominga de Adviento, a servant woman	mezzo-soprano	Marietta Simpson
Josefa Miranda, the abbess	mezzo-soprano	Felicity Palmer
Martina Laborde, an insane woman	mezzo-soprano	Jean Rigby
Orchestra		London Philharmonic Orchestra
Director		Silviu Purcărete
Dramaturgy		Edward Kemp
Costume and lighting design		Helmut Stürmer
Video projection		Andu Dumitrescu
Chorus; Chorus master		The Glyndebourne Chorus; Thomas Blunt

At Glyndebourne, the performance lasted for 3 hours 50 minutes, including a 1-hour 20 minutes interval. The staging is a co-production with the Lithuanian National Opera and Ballet Theatre.

== Instrumentation ==
The instrumentation calls for:

- Woodwinds: 2 flutes (both also doubling on piccolo, second also on alto flute, 2 oboes, 2 clarinets, 1 bass clarinet, saxophone (soprano, alto, baritone), 2 bassoons (second doubling on contrabassoon)
- Brass: 4 horns, 2 trumpets, 2 trombones, 1 tuba
- Percussion (for 2 players): glockenspiel, crotales, marimba, tubular bells, 3 gongs, cow bells, triangle, cymbals (medium and low), sizzle cymbals, sleighbells (high and loud, 3–4 exotic types, of special sound colour), tam-tam (low), anvil, tambourine, bass drum, wood blocks (really high), African beans rattle, timpani, vibraphone, cencerros (really high), maracas
- harp, celesta, strings (12 · 0 · 8 · 6 · 4 (2 with 5 strings))

== Comments ==
Unusually, Love and Other Demons consistently uses multiple languages. The different levels of narration and action in the story have their own characteristic language: English is the 'everyday language' of the noblemen, Latin is the language of the church rites, Spanish is used by Delaura whenever his conversations with Sierva touch on personal feelings, and Yoruba is the 'secret' language of the slaves.

== Reception ==
The Glyndebourne performance of Love and Other Demons was awarded four out of five stars by Andrew Clements of The Guardian, who stated that “if structurally it is his most conventional [opera] so far, it is also well made and musically rewarding.” Clements criticized Hamvai's libretto, writing that the removal of the 18th century Latin American context neutralizes “the power of Márquez's magic realism”. However, Clements also argued that Eötvös's score “is full of authentically magical things. His orchestral imagination is keen and he has simplified his musical language without ever making it simplistic. There are ravishing sounds here, combined with equally convincing vocal writing often spun over diaphanous textures, even though sometimes the drama needs more of a musical push.”

== German production, 2009 ==
The first German production was presented on 31 January 2009 at the Chemnitz Opera under the direction of Dietrich Hilsdorf and with Julia Bauer in the role of Maria.
