= Lady Sarashina (opera) =

2008 opera by Péter Eötvös

- Opera by Péter Eötvös
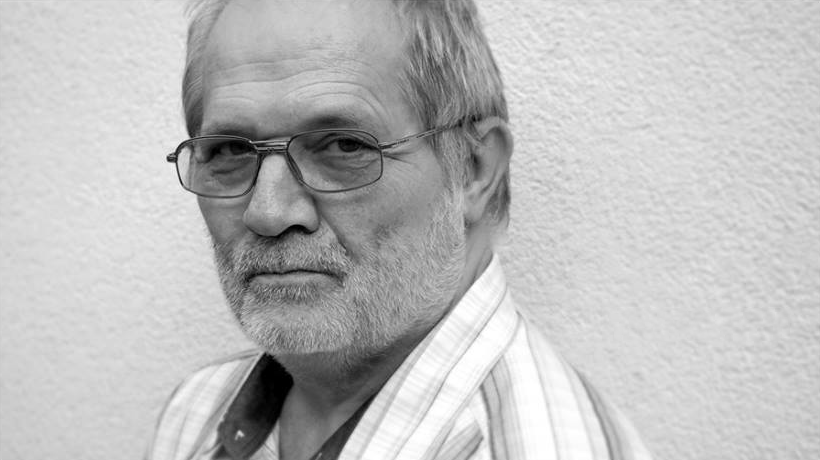
- The composer in Gáspár Stekovics's photo
- Librettist: Mari Mezei
- Based on: As I crossed a Bridge of Dreams
- Premiere: 3 March 2008; Opéra National de Lyon

Lady Sarashina is an opera in nine tableaux by Hungarian composer Péter Eötvös to a libretto by Mari Mezei, based on As I crossed a Bridge of Dreams, fragments of an 11th-century diary (Japan, 1008) by Takasue's daughter, also known as Lady Sarashina. It premiered on 4 March 2008 at the Opéra National de Lyon. The opera is the result of a commission by the opera in Lyon; it was broadcast in full on France Musique on 27 September 2008.

== Libretto ==
Lady Sarashina lived in Japan in the eleventh century, a time of high civilization where Japanese women held an essential role in social, economic and cultural life. She is the author of a classic piece in Japanese literature, The Journal of Sarashina. In her diary, she writes about her love of Japanese nature and landscapes, describes the sites she visits, the pilgrimages, dreams and monologues about life and death. In the opera, Lady Sarashina narrates her life. All the other roles are portrayed by three other singers, the Vocal Trio.

== Roles ==
Role	Voice type	Premiere cast, 4 March 2008 Conductor: Peter Eötvös
Lady Sarashina	soprano	Mireille Delunsch
Trio vocal: Le Garde, Le Bouffon, Le Messager, Le Père, Le Chat, Le Bonze, Le Gentilhomme	baritone	Peter Bording
Trio vocal: La Princesse, La Jeune Lady, Une dame du rêve	soprano	Ilse Eerens
Trio vocal: L'Impératrice, La Mère, La Sœur, Une dame du rêve, La Dame d'honneur	mezzo-soprano	Salome Kammer
Orchestra		Orchestre de l'Opéra de Lyon
Director		Ushio Amagatsu
Set		Natsuyuki Nakanishi
Costumes		Masatomo Ota
Lighting design		Yukiko Yoshimoto

The staging was a co-production with the Théâtre national de l'opéra-comique, where it was staged in February 2009. In April 2013, the same production was mounted by the Polish National Opera in Teatr Wielki, Warsaw.

== Instrumentation ==
The instrumentation calls for: 2 fl (both + Piccolo, second + altfl.), 1 ob (+ Eng.horn), 3 clar. (third + basscl.), 2 bassoon (second + contrabassoon), 1 sax (S-A-T-Bar), Winds: 3 - 2- 3- 1, 2 percussion, 1 harp, 1 sampler keyboard Strings: 6 - 5 - 4 - 3 - 2

== Critical reception ==
In 2008, the opera received the prestigious Prix du Syndicat de la critique for Best Musical Creation. The world premiere drew wide international attention from the press. Reviews ranged from favorable to triumphant.
