= Péter Eötvös =

Hungarian composer, conductor and teacher (1944–2024)

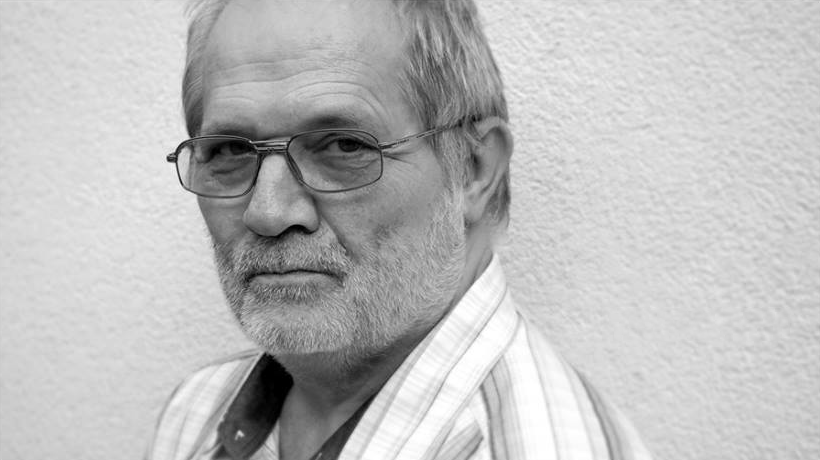
- Eötvös in 2018
- Born: 2 January 1944; Székelyudvarhely, Kingdom of Hungary
- Died: 24 March 2024 (aged 80); Budapest, Hungary
- Education: Franz Liszt Academy of Music; Musikhochschule Köln
- Occupations: Composer; Conductor; Academic teacher
- Organizations: Oeldorf Group; Ensemble InterContemporain
- Works: List of compositions
- Website: www.eotvospeter.com

Péter Eötvös (Hungarian: Eötvös Péter, pronounced [ˈøtvøʃ ˈpeːtɛr]; 2 January 1944 – 24 March 2024) was a Hungarian composer, conductor and academic teacher.

After studies of composition in Budapest and Cologne, Eötvös composed film music in Hungary from 1962. He played with the Stockhausen Ensemble between 1968 and 1976. He was a founding member of the Oeldorf Group in 1973, continuing his association until the late 1970s. From 1979 to 1991, he was musical director and conductor of the Ensemble InterContemporain, and from 1985 to 1988 he was principal guest conductor of the BBC Symphony Orchestra, after which he conducted several other orchestras.

As a composer, Eötvös was known for the operas Love and Other Demons and Three Sisters, both of which were performed outside Hungary. He was open to influences from different cultures.

== Life and career ==
Péter Eötvös was born on 2 January 1944 in Székelyudvarhely, Transylvania, then part of Hungary, now Romania. Although his family had to flee from there when he was aged one, he thought of Transylvania and its cosmopolitism as his home. As a child, he received a thorough musical education, which included becoming familiar with works by the Hungarian composer Béla Bartók. Eötvös later expressed his feelings of a strong link between Hungarian grammar and the music of Bartók, claiming that the specific "Hungarian" interpretations of music by Bartók and Zoltán Kodály (as well as other Hungarian conductors such as George Szell, Ferenc Fricsay, Eugene Ormandy, Georg Solti and Fritz Reiner) incorporated the subtle accents and rhythms of the Hungarian language.

Eötvös's mother, a pianist, participated in the musical and intellectual life of Budapest and took her son to many performances and rehearsals of opera, operetta and theatre. He learned the piano and also wrote plays and small pieces. He won a composition contest at the age eleven and was then noticed in the Hungarian artistic world. He met the Hungarian-Austrian composer György Ligeti, who was 21 years his senior. Ligeti recommended him to Kodály at the Franz Liszt Academy of Music. Eötvös was accepted with honours at the academy at age 14. There, upon Kodály's advice, he studied composition with János Viski.

In 1958, he was asked to accompany film projections with improvisations on piano and Hammond organ. He was then asked to write scores for theatre and cinema. By 1970, he had composed several pieces of utility music. During a period of ten years he developed personal musical preferences, for Gesualdo (the idea of the madrigal returns in pieces such as Drei Madrigalkomödien and Tri sestry), American jazz of the 1960s, electronic music (of which Karlheinz Stockhausen's figure was inseparable), and Pierre Boulez, among others.

Eötvös received a German Academic Exchange Service (DAAD) scholarship to study abroad in 1966, leaving for Cologne following the examples of Kurtág and Ligeti. The Hochschule für Musik Köln and the studio of the broadcaster Westdeutscher Rundfunk worked together at that time, which allowed students to use advanced technology in one of the best studios in Europe. Eötvös worked there from 1971 to 1979. He studied composition with Bernd Alois Zimmermann, as well as conducting. He met Stockhausen, already being familiar with his work. Eötvös became Stockhausen's engineer and copyist (the score of Telemusik is copied by him), as well as his musician and conductor; he performed at the Expo '70 in Osaka for months, and he conducted the La Scala premiere of Donnerstag aus Licht in 1981, as well as its Covent Garden performances in 1985.

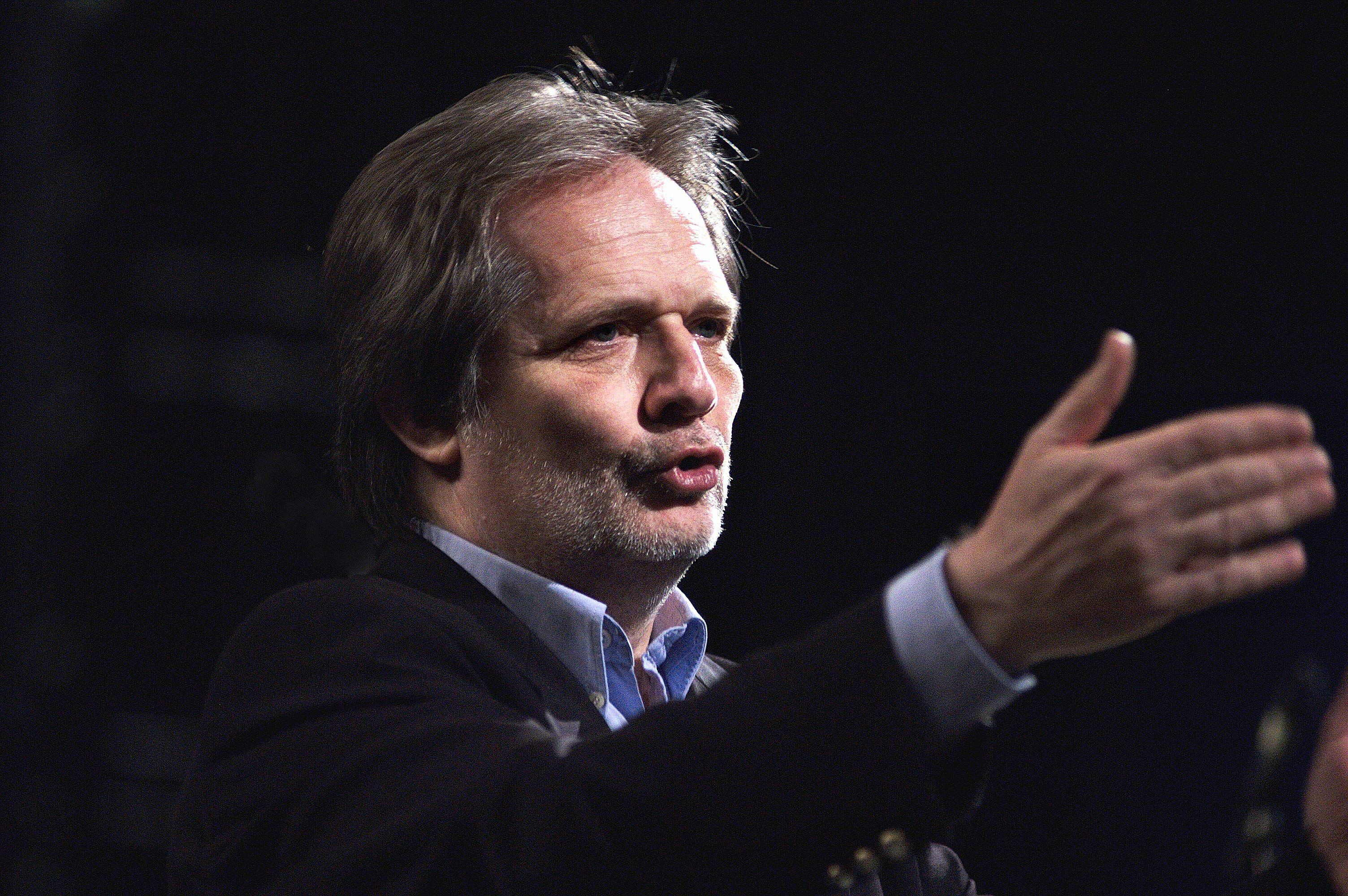
Eötvös conducting in 2006

In 1978, Boulez asked him to conduct the opening concert of IRCAM in Paris. He was then appointed musical director of the Ensemble InterContemporain, holding the position until 1991. He first performed at the Proms in 1980 and was regularly invited by the BBC Orchestra between 1985 and 1988. This period also marks his first success as a composer with his instrumental piece Chinese Opera (1986), written for the 10-year anniversary of the Ensemble InterContemporain. The piece constitutes a reflection on the theatricality of sound, as the composer spreads the musicians through the stage, a process also found in Three Sisters. Each movement is a tribute to directors he admired: Bob Wilson, Klaus Michael Grüber, Luc Bondy, Patrice Chéreau, Jacques Tati and Peter Brook.

Jean-Pierre Brossman, director of the Opéra National de Lyon at that time, admired his ability to take into consideration the work of artists and directors, and commissioned an opera in 1986: Three Sisters, based on Chekhov's play. In 2008, Eötvös premiered two other operas, Lady Sarashina and Love and Other Demons.

Eötvös was principal guest conductor of the Gothenburg Symphony Orchestra from 2003 to 2007. His recording of Luciano Berio's Sinfonia with the London Voices (DG) received the award for "Technical excellence in recording" by the BBC Music Magazine in 2006. He served as a member of the jury of the Tōru Takemitsu composition competition in 2014.

His first opera to a Hungarian libretto, Valuska, was premiered in Budapest on 2 December 2023. Based on the 1989 novel The Melancholy of Resistance by László Krasznahorkai, it was commissioned by the Hungarian State Opera.

Eötvös founded the International Eötvös Institute for young conductors and composers in Budapest in 1991. He taught at the Hochschule für Musik Karlsruhe from 1992 to 1998 and later became a professor at the Hochschule für Musik und Tanz Köln. He returned to Karlsruhe in 2002, remaining in the position until 2007.

== Personal life ==
Eötvös was married three times. His first marriage was to the actress Piroska Molnár; they had a son who died in 1994. His second marriage was to the Taiwanese-German pianist Pi-hsien Chen; they had a daughter. His third marriage was to Mária Eötvösné Mezei. They lived in Cologne, Paris and Hilversum (Netherlands) for decades. In 2004, when Hungary joined the European Union, they moved back to Budapest, where Eötvös founded the Eötvös Contemporary Music Foundation the same year.

Eötvös died in Budapest on 24 March 2024, at the age of 80, after a serious illness.

== Compositional style and critical reception ==
In his extensive work as a conductor, Eötvös was exposed to a variety of compositional styles. Federico Capitoni cited an eclectic range of apparent elements and influences in Eötvös's music: the "lucid folly" of Edgar Varese and Frank Zappa, Ligeti's sense of irony, a certain "American" boldness, rigor reminiscent of dodecaphonists, and rhythms after his "beloved" Bartok and Stravinsky.

Composing for film and theatre in his first large-scale compositions, Eötvös learned the importance of timing and synchronisation. He also discovered noise as a sound, which was the starting point of some later compositions. The work Zero Points begins with a countdown, as if destined to synchronise sound and image, the double bass then takes on a high-pitched sound reminding the cracks of an old magnetic tape. His music encompassed a variety of timbres and soundscapes. Extended techniques such as over-pressure bowings coexisted with lyrical folk songs and synthesized sounds. Eötvös provided detailed instructions on mixture of instruments for electronic manipulation or amplification.

Sándor Weöres' poem Néma zene inspired two works for orchestra and voice, Atlantis (1995) and Ima (2002, also with chorus). Reviewing a 2016 recording of Eötvös's concertante music with the composer himself conducting the Orchestre philharmonique de Radio France (Alpha 208), Capitoni noted Luciano Berio's and Frederic Rzewski's influence in the percussionist-vocalist of the 2012–2013 Speaking Drums (soloist Martin Grubinger). He observed timbral exploration in the 2012 second violin concerto DoReMi (soloist Midori) and a sometimes clumsy, sometimes brilliant approach to cello–soli dialogue in the 2010–2011 Concerto Grosso (soloist Jean-Guihen Queyras).

== Works ==
Eötvös was especially known for his operas; he also composed orchestral works including concertos, music for ensembles, chamber music, vocal music, film scores and incidental music. His works were published by Durand, Editio Musica Budapest, Ricordi and especially by Schott:

=== Stage works ===
Eötvös was influenced by the music and theatre of Japan. He composed his first opera, Harakiri, in 1973, whilst working in Osaka. The opera is based on the seppuku death of Yukio Mishima. 1996/97, Eötvös composed Tri sestry (Three Sisters) to a libretto in Russian after Chekhov's play. It was premiered at the Opéra National de Lyon in 1998 and was repeated at opera houses in Europe. The one-act opera Lady Sarashina was also based on Japanese tradition, the 11th-century diary of a lady-in-waiting; it was premiered in Lyon on 8 April 2008. His opera Love and Other Demons was based on Gabriel García Márquez' novella; it was premiered on 10 August 2008 at Glyndebourne, UK. He composed Der goldene Drache (The Golden Dragon) in 2013/14 for Ensemble Modern, based on the play by Roland Schimmelpfennig. It was premiered at the Bockenheimer Depot on 29 June 2014, conducted by the composer. The one-act-opera Senza sangue (Without Blood) was composed to a libretto by Alessandro Baricco for two voices, as a work to be coupled with Bartók's Bluebeard's Castle. It was first played in Cologne in concert by the New York Philharmonic in 2015, and then on stage at the Festival d'Avignon in 2016. His opera Valuska was commissioned by the Hungarian State Opera; his first opera to a Hungarian libretto based on Krasznahorkai's novel, was premiered there in 2023 and was played in a German version, Valuschka, at Theater Regensburg in 2024.

== Awards ==
- Prize Bartók-Pásztory (1997)
- Kossuth Prize (2002)
- Commandeur des Arts et des Lettres (2003)
- Grand Prix Antoine Livio from the Presse musicale internationale (2006)
- Frankfurter Musikpreis (2007)
- Hungarian Order of Saint Stephen (2015)
- Grand Prix artistique (composition musicale) de la Fondation Simone et Cino Del Duca (2016)
- Ninth Roche Commission (2018)
- Goethe Medal (2018)
- BBVA Foundation Frontiers of Knowledge Award (2021)
- Royal Philharmonic Society Music Award (2002)

=== Memberships ===
- Member of the Academy of Arts, Berlin (1997)
- Member of the Széchenyi Academy of Literature and Arts (Széchenyi Iroldami és Művészeti Akadémia)
- Member of the Sächsische Akademie der Künste in Dresden
- Member of the Royal Swedish Academy of Music (2000)

== Recordings ==
=== As conductor ===
- Elliott Carter: What Next? (ECM 1817) OCLC 54062653
- Friedrich Cerha: Konzert für Violoncello und Orchester / Franz Schreker: Kammersymphonie (ECM 1887) OCLC 1040032476
- Helmut Lachenmann: Schwankungen am Rand (ECM 1789) OCLC 1039897061
- Béla Bartók: Viola Concerto / Eötvös: Replica for Viola and Orchestra / György Kurtág: Movement for Viola and Orchestra (with Kim Kashkashian and the Netherlands Radio Chamber Orchestra (RKO), 1999, ECM New Series 1711) OCLC 931313951
- Stravinsky: The Rite of Spring, Junge Deutsche Philharmonie, 2004, BMC Records OCLC 225283507
- Luciano Berio: Sinfonia for 8 voices and orchestra / Ekphrasis (Continuo II) for orchestra, Göteborgs Symfoniker, London Voices, 2005, Deutsche Grammophon – 0289 477 5380 3 GH OCLC 941807970
