= Mireille Flour =

French classical harpist (1910–1984)

Mireille Flour (29 April 1910 in Marseille – 1984 was a French classical harpist, naturalised Belgian.

== Biography ==
After studying at the conservatoire de Marseille, then the conservatoire de Paris for half a century, Flour was a striking figure of the harp in Belgium. A soloist for the Institut national de radiodiffusion (INR) under the direction of Franz André, she was also a professor of harp at the Conservatoire royal de Bruxelles from 1927, where she trained numerous students. She established the "Quatuor de harpes Mireille Flour", which enjoyed a fairly significant success.

Her very extensive repertoire led her to play with many orchestras. Her discography is relatively important and varied. Composer Pierre Bartholomée dedicated her a piece entitled Catalogue pour quatuor de harpes.
