= Ami Maayani =

Israeli composer and conductor

- עמי מעייני
- Born: 1936
- Died: 17 February 2019 (aged 83)
- Occupations: Composer; Conductor

Ami Maayani (Hebrew: עמי מעייני; January 1936 – February 17, 2019) was an Israeli composer. The founder and conductor of the Israel National Youth Orchestra, the Tel Aviv Youth Orchestra, the Haifa Youth Orchestra and the Technion Symphony Orchestra, from 1970 to 1973 and 1976–1980 he was the chairman of the Israel Composers' League. Of note is Maayani's Concerto for Guitar and Orchestra, Qumran and Serenade in D. Zvi Keren in his book Contemporary Israeli music: its sources and stylistic development (1980) said "The works of Ami Maayani, which have formed a continuation and extension of this school, have a style which might be described as post-Eastern-Mediterranean." The American Organist said, "The lush improvisatory elements and Arabic modal influences in the music of Ami Maayani complement the pandiatonic polyphony of Yuval Rabin. Sabin Levi, on the other hand, employs minimalism and Sephardic folklore."

Ami Maayani died of cancer on 17 February 2019, at age 82.

== Recorded works ==
Selected recordings of works by Ami Maayani include:

Album / title	Works	Performers	Label / catalogue	Reference
Music for Harp	Triptique (Toccata, Maqamat, Passacaglia), Sonatas Nos. 1 and 2, Five Pieces for the Young Harpist	Naoko Yoshino, harp	IMP Digital / FONS 02-9420	
Four Baroque Sonatas	Sonata for Solo Violin; Sonata for Solo Cello; Sonatina for Guitar; Sonatine en trio	Bing Jing Yu, violin; Natalia Khoma, cello; Tali Roth, guitar; Orit Wolf, piano	IMP Digital / FONS 01-2096	
Piano Music – Percussion Music	Avant Propos; Deux Préludes pour piano; Deux Impromptus; Concerto for Percussion and Two Pianos; Three Preludes	Aviram Reichert, Orit Wolf, Josef Reshef, pianos; Chen Zimbalista, percussion; Israel Academy of Music Percussion Ensemble; Alon Bor, conductor	IMP Digital / FONS 02-2096	
Harp Trios	Beethoven–Maayani; Ibert; Debussy	Amir Sela, flute; Fiona Vanderspar-Simon, violin; Richard L. Simon, viola; Ruth Maayani, harp	FONS 36-2001	
Maayani Conducts Maayani	Jüdische Lieder – Song Cycle No. 2; Concerto for Percussion and Eight Wind Instruments	Edna Prochnik, mezzo-soprano; Odessa Philharmonic Orchestra; Gideon Steiner, percussion; Israel Philharmonic Ensemble	FONS 36-2002	
Harp Chamber Music	Arabesques Nos. 1 and 2; Trio for Harp, Flute and Viola; Quartet for Harp and String Trio; Deux Madrigaux	Ruth Maayani, harp; Noam Buchman, flute; Nitai Zori, violin; Gad Lewertoff, viola; Hillel Zori, cello; Israel Woodwind Quintet	FONS 36-2003	
Music for Violin	Concerto for Violin and Orchestra; Sonata for Solo Violin	Lydia Mordkovitch, violin; Jerusalem Symphony Orchestra; Mendi Rodan	FONS 36-2004	
The Harp Concerti	Concerto No. 1 for Harp and Orchestra; Concertino for Harp and String Orchestra; Arabesque No. 3 for Harp Quartet	Susanna Mildonian, harp; Jerusalem Symphony Orchestra; Carl St. Clair; Ruth Maayani, harp; T. A. String Nonet; Nayden Todorov; Pacific Harp Ensemble	FONS 36-2006	
Concerto for Viola and Orchestra / Concerto for Guitar and Orchestra	Concerto for Viola and Orchestra; Concerto for Guitar and Orchestra	Daniel Benyamini, viola; Jerusalem Symphony Orchestra; David Shallon; Sharon Isbin, guitar; Jerusalem Symphony Orchestra; Kazuhiro Koizumi	FONS 36-2007	
Symphonic Music	Régalim; Qumran; Ouverture solennelle; Scherzo méditerranéen	Israel Philharmonic Orchestra; Jerusalem Symphony Orchestra; Zubin Mehta; Eliahu Inbal; Lawrence Foster	FONS 36-2008	
Hebrew Poems from Spain – Books I–IV	Hebrew Poems from Spain	Anna Skibinsky, Marla Joffe, Silvie Bendova, sopranos; Ira Barsky, mezzo-soprano; Anat Eini, alto; David Sebba, baritone; Guy Bonné, bass-baritone; Ruth Maayani, harp	FONS 36-2009	
Chamber Music	Poème; Sonatine en trio; Brass Quintet	Noam Buchman, flute; Yigal Tuneh, violin; Miriam Hartman, viola; Alexander Kaganovski, cello; Yevgeny Yehudin, clarinet; Hillel Zori, cello; Orit Wolf, piano; Ram Oren, Yigal Meltzer, Michael Slatkin, Stewart Taylor, Shmuel Hershko	FONS 36-2010	
Arabesques Nos. 1–5	Arabesques Nos. 1–5	Grace Wong, harp; Noam Buchman, flute; Ruth Maayani, harp; Pacific Harp Ensemble; Chamber Ensemble of the Israel Academy of Music, Tel Aviv University; Ami Maayani; Sabin Levi, organ	FONS 36-2011	
Twelve Fantasies for Piano in Prelude and Fugue Form	Twelve Fantasies for Piano	Artists of the Faculty of the Tel Aviv Academy of Music; children from the Givatayim Conservatory	FONS 36-2012-2	
String Quartet / String Trio	String Quartet; String Trio	Alexander Mayorov, Natalya Yuchimchuk, violins; Anton Yaroshenko, viola; Alexey Makarov, cello	FONS 36-2013	
Concerto pour octuor / Concerto symphonique	Concerto pour octuor; Concerto symphonique	Marcelo Ehrlich, flute; Dima Malkin, oboe d’amore; Elad Avakrat, bass clarinet; Naama Golan, trumpet; Gitit Alpert Boazson, harp; Yizhar Kershon, harpsichord; Amos Boazson, viola; Eyal Ganor, double bass; Israel Sharon, conductor; Florence Sitruk, harp; Philharmonisches Orchester Heidelberg; Romely Pfund	FONS 36-2014	
Between Yiddish and Ladino	Jüdische Lieder – Song Cycles Nos. 1 and 2; Five Sephardic Songs	Willy Haparnass, baritone; Mira Zakai, alto; Jerusalem Symphony Orchestra; Mendi Rodan; Ami Maayani; Vilnius Municipal Choir “Jauna Muzika”; Vaclovas Augustinas	FONS 36-2016	
Violin and Harp Music	Partita en mode phrygien; Sonata for Solo Violin; Passacaglia dans le style oriental	Sivann Maayani Zelikoff, violin; Ruth Maayani, harp	FONS 36-2017	
The Polyphonic Violin	Arabesque No. 6 for Solo Violin	Sivann Maayani Zelikoff, violin	FONS Music Foundation	
Musikalische Perlen	Arabesque No. 2 for Flute and Harp	Flute and harp duo album	Ars Produktion	
Toccata	Toccata for harp	Elisa Netzer, harp	Solo harp album	
Music 1967, Violin Concerto, Violoncello Concerto	Music 1967; Concerto for Violin and Orchestra; Concerto for Violoncello and Orchestra	Lydia Mordkovitch, violin; Uzi Wiesel, cello; Jerusalem Symphony Orchestra; Mendi Rodan	Israel Classical Productions / IBA	
Tal, Maayani, Avni, Kaminski	Includes a work by Ami Maayani	Israel Philharmonic Orchestra; Zubin Mehta	Helicon / Israel Music Anthology	
