= Zsolt Durkó =

Hungarian composer

Zsolt Durkó (10 April 1934 – 2 April 1997) was a Hungarian composer. He studied at the Budapest Academy of Music from 1955 to 1960 as a student of Ferenc Farkas, where he later taught. He earned the Distinguished Composition of the Year in 1975 at the UNESCO International Rostrum of Composers in Paris.
