= Frigyes Hidas =

Hungarian composer (1928–2007)

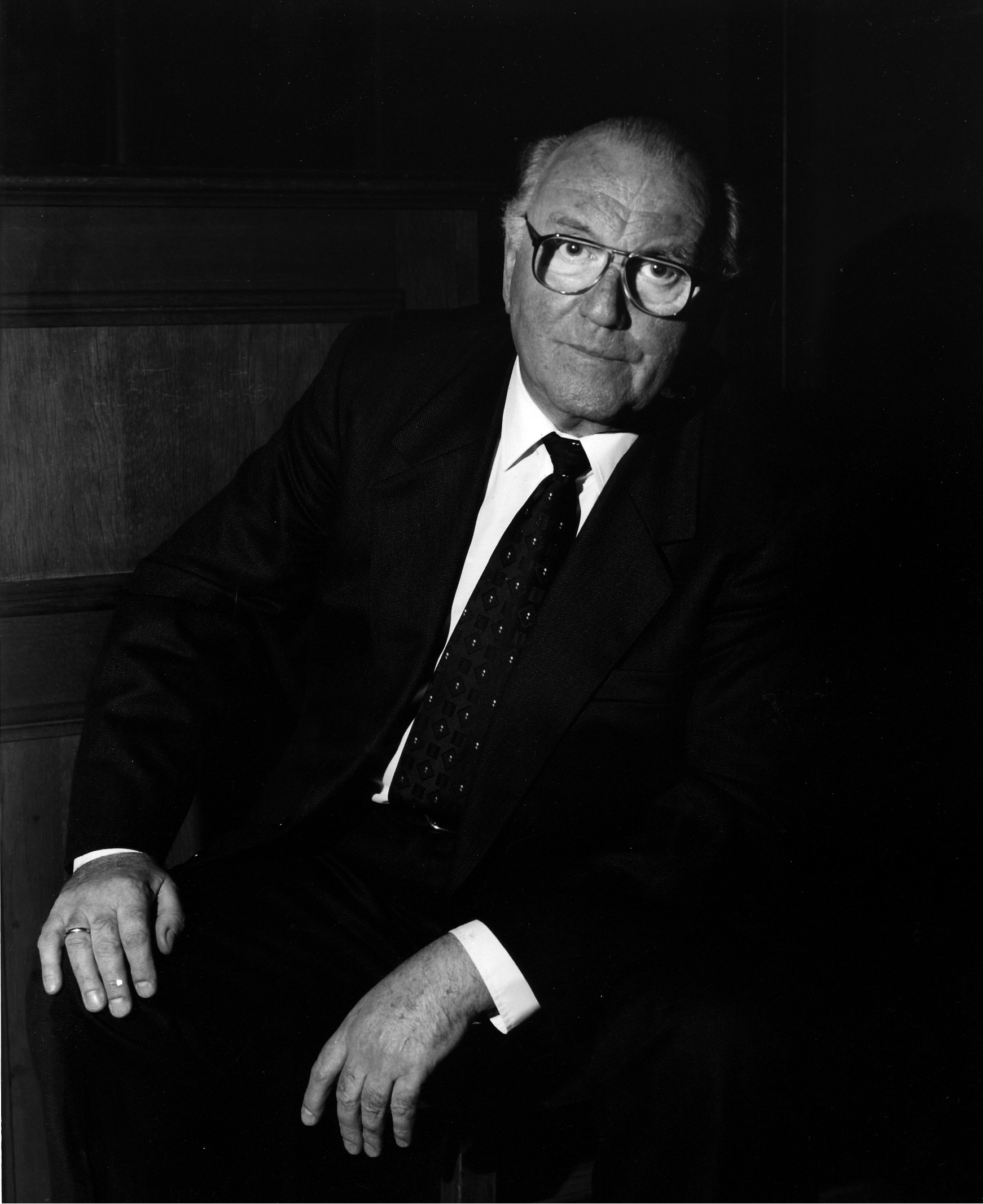
Frigyes Hidas

Frigyes Hidas (Hungarian: [ˈfriɟɛʃ ˈhidɒʃ]; 25 May 1928 – 7 March 2007) was a Hungarian composer.

Hidas was born and died in Budapest, where he studied composition at the Franz Liszt Academy of Music with János Visky. After his studies, he was the musical director of the National Theater in Budapest from 1951 to 1966 and also held the same role at the city's Operetta Theater from 1974 to 1979.

Following this, Hidas was a freelance composer. His oeuvre covered almost every genre, including operas, ballets, concertos, other orchestral works, chamber music, and vocal and choral music. He was one of the foremost names in the world of contemporary chamber and concert band music for wind instruments. In addition, he enjoyed various commissions from opera houses, radio stations, universities, ballet companies, and musical association and federations. He received many prizes and other forms of recognition for his musical services.

== Partial list of works ==
- Concerto per oboe e orchestra (1951) concerto
- 1. VONÓSNÉGYES (1954) chamber music
- SONATA for oboe and piano (1955) chamber music
- Trumpet Concerto No. 1 (1956) concerto
- SONATA for organ (1956) solo
- Missa brevis (1956) choir and solo instrument(s)
- Violin Concerto No. 1 (1957) concerto
- Concerto No. 1 for clarinet and orchestra (1958) concerto
- Concerto for viola and orchestra (1959) concerto
- Cantate de minoribus (1959) choir and orchestra
- SYMPHONY (1960) symphonic work
- Színek (1960) stage play
- 1. FÚVÓSKVINTETT (1961) chamber music
- 2. VONÓSNÉGYES (1963) chamber music
- FANTASIA for clarinet and piano (1965) chamber music
- Asszony és az igazság, Az (1965) stage play
- Concertino for string orchestra (1966) string orchestra
- Concerto for flute and orchestra (1967) concerto
- Hajnaltól estig (1967) choir and orchestra
- Concerto per corno e orchestra (1968) concerto
- 2. FÚVÓSKVINTETT - LO SVAGO (1969) chamber music
- Concertino for four flutes, four clarinets and string orchestra (1969) symphonic work
- FANTASIA for organ (1969) solo
- QUINTETTO D´OTTONI (1972) chamber music
- Brass Sextet (1972) chamber music
- Concerto for piano and orchestra (1972) concerto
- Little Brass Quintet (1973) chamber music
- Gyászzene - Requiem egy hadseregért (1973) solo voice(s), choir and orchestra
- Chamber Music (1974) chamber music
- Cédrus (1975) stage play
- FANTASIA for trombone (1977) solo
- INTRODUZIONE E FUGHETTA (1977) for two trombones
- INTERLUDIO (1977) for three trombones
- SCHERZO E CORALE (1977) for four trombones
- Adagio (1977) symphonic work
- Concerto Semplice per clarinetto e orchestra (1977) concerto
- Bösendorfer (1977) stage play
- Five Movements (1978) chamber music
- Capriccio (1979) brass band
- Seven Bagatelles (1979) for twelve trombones
- 3. FÚVÓSKVINTETT (1979) chamber music
- Concerto per trombone e orchestra (1979) concerto
- Concerto per arpa e orchestra (1979) concerto
- MEDITATION for bass trombone (1979) solo
- Ballet Music (1980) brass band
- VIDÁM ZENE (1980) brass band
- Six Studies (1980) chamber music
- TRIO (1980) chamber music
- Concerto for Bassoon and String Orchestra (1980) concerto
- Concertino for wind symphony orchestra (1981) brass band
- SUITE for wind symphony orchestra (1981) brass band
- PLAY (1981) chamber music
- Rhapsody (1982) for bass trombone and wind band
- MOVEMENT (1982) for trombone and piano
- Septett (1982) chamber music
- THREE LITTLE SCHERZOS (1982) chamber music
- Edzésminták - 16 rézfúvós szextett (1982) chamber music
- EDZÉSMINTÁK - 24 rézfúvós kvintett (1982) chamber music
- BALATONI NÉPDALOK (1982) chamber music
- KILENC BÉKÉS-MEGYEI NÉPDAL (1982) chamber music
- THREE SKETCHES (1982) chamber music
- Ballad for violoncello and orchestra (1982) concerto
- Cymboa for cimbalom, oboe and string orchestra (1982) concerto
- Concerto No. 2 (Ohio Concerto) for flute and wind ensemble (1983) concerto
- 5 X 5 (1983) chamber music
- Academic Quintet (1983) chamber music
- Little Suite (1983) chamber music
- Music for Brass (1983) chamber orchestra
- Trumpet Fantasy for trumpet and piano (1983) chamber music
- Concerto Barocco for alto trombone and string orchestra (1983) concerto
- Concerto No. 2 for trombone and orchestra (1983) concerto
- Trumpet Fantasy for trumpet and orchestra (1983) concerto
- Fantasy for Twelve Horns (1983) chamber orchestra
- Repülős induló (1984) brass band
- FANTASY AND FUGUE (1984) brass band
- NEUHOFEN SIGNAL (1984) brass band
- NEUHOFEN SUITE (1984) brass band
- Széchenyi-concerto (1984) symphonic work
- Preludium, Passacaglia and Fugue (1984) concerto
- Dunakanyar (1984) stage play
- ÜNNEPI ZENE (1985) brass band
- Circus Suite (1985) brass band
- 1. NÉPDALSZVIT (1985) brass band
- 2. NÉPDALSZVIT (1985) brass band
- HELYŐRSÉGI INDULÓ (1985) brass band
- NÉGYESFOGAT (1985) chamber music
- Divertimento (1985) chamber music
- MAGYAR NÉPDALOK (1985) chamber music
- Musique pour six (1985) chamber music
- PIAN-ORG (1985) chamber music
- Quintetto Concertante (1986) concerto
- ALTEBA TRIO (1986) for three trombones
- Five Miniatures (1986) chamber music
- 3. VONÓSNÉGYES (1986) chamber music
- THREE MOVEMENTS FOR ORCHESTRA (1987) symphonic work
- ETUDE (1988) brass band
- Double Concerto for tenor and bass trombone and symphony orchestra (1988) concerto
- REGES THARSIS (1988) choir and solo instrument(s)
- 1+5 (1989) bass trombone and wind quintet
- ONLY TWO (1989) chamber music
- EL NEM TÁNCOLT BALETT, AZ szimfonikus zenekarra (1989) symphonic work
- Concerto No. 2 for horn and string orchestra (1989) concerto
- Double Concerto for horn, harp and string orchestra with percussion (1989) concerto
- PSALMUS CL (1989) choir and solo instrument(s)
- VÁLTOZÓ RITMUSOK (1990) brass band
- Little Fanfare (1990) chamber orchestra
- Tuba Quartet (1990) chamber music
- FOUR LITTLE PIECES (1990) chamber music
- SAXOPHONE QUARTET (1990) chamber music
- FOUR MOVEMENTS FOR BRASS ENSEMBLE (1991) brass band
- Florida Concerto (1991) for tenor and Bass trombones and wind orchestra
- Baroque Concerto for alto trombone and organ (1991) chamber music
- Domine, Dona Nobis Pacem (1991) for trombone and organ
- MESE (1991) chamber music
- Episode (1991) concerto
- Missa in honorem reginae pacis (1991) solo voice(s), choir and solo instrument(s)
- ÁLMODJ BACHOT (1991) stage play
- A Little Encore (1992) chamber music
- TRIGA (1992) chamber music
- Quintettinio No. 1 (1992) chamber music
- QUINTETTINO NO. 2 (1992) chamber music
- QUINTETTINO NO. 3 (1992) chamber music
- Ballad for violoncello and piano (1992) chamber music
- MUSIC FOR HARP AND VIOLIN (1992) chamber music
- Köszöntő (1992) symphonic work
- STRING FANTASY (1992) string orchestra
- Brussels Concerto (1992) concerto
- ALMOST B.A.C.H. (1993) brass band
- ÜNNEPI INDULÓ (1993) brass band
- MUSICA SOLENNE (1993) brass band
- Tutti Frutti (1993) brass band
- Suite for Strings (1993) chamber orchestra
- 188 bars for brass (1995) chamber orchestra
- Septettino (1995) chamber music
- Variable Spirits (1995) chamber music
- Concerto per clavicembalo e piccola orchestra d´archi (1995) concerto
- IV. Európai Ifjúsági Zenei Fesztivál záróhangjai, A (1995) choir and orchestra
- REQUIEM (1995) solo voice(s), choir and orchestra
- EUPHONIADA (1995) concerto
- Sestettino (1995) chamber music
- EL NEM TÁNCOLT BALETT, AZ brass band (1996) brass band
- SPRIGHTLY TUNES (1996) brass band
- Tuba Concerto (1996) concerto
- 1+4 (1996) chamber music
- RITMUSJÁTÉK (1996) chamber music

- Cancate de minorites for symphonic orchestra, man's choir, & narrator (1963) [25'; manuscript]
- Signal for 4 trumpets & (5+4) trombones & tuba (1973) [4’; manuscript]
- Fantasy for 12 horns (1978) [4'; ITC Marc Reift]
- Fantasy for 12 Horns (1983) [4’; ITC Marc Reiff]
- Ünnepi zene / Festive Music (1985) [8’; Johann Kliment Musikverlag]
- Változó ritmusok / Changing Rhythms (1990) [3’; manuscript]
- Saxophon Quartet (1990) [12'; Edition Darok]
- Four Movements for brass ensemble (1991) [7’; manuscript]
- Euphoiada concerto for euphonium & wind ensemble (1995) [10'; Johann Kliment Verlag]
- 188 Bars for Brass for 12 horns, 12 trumpets, 10 trombones, 2 tubas & percussion (1995) [9’; manuscript]
- Septettino for 3 trumpets, 2 trombones & tuba (also in version for brass quintet) (1995) [3'; manuscript]
- Sestettino for 3 trumpets, 2 trombones & tuba (1995) [3'; manuscript]
- Trombone Quartet [also version for Tuba Quartet] (1996) [8’; Musikverlag Bruno Uetz]
- Sonata for oboe & piano (1995) [14'; Musikverlag Kartaus-Schmülling]
- A IV. Európai Ifjúsági Fesztivál záró hangjai / Finale to the Fourth European Youth Music Festival for concert band & youth choir (1995) [4:30; FAM]
- Requiem for soprano, alto, tenor, bass, concert band & mixed choir (1995); Stormworks Europe]
- Ritmusjáték / Play of Rhythmanuscript for 4 clarinets (1996) [2’; BMC]
- The Undanced Ballet version for wind band (1996) [18’; BMC]
- Sprightly Tunes (1996) [8:30; BMC]
- Tuba Concerto for tuba & wind orchestra (1996) [10’; BMC]
- Scherzo for tuba & 4 horns (1996) [2:25; Musikverlag B. Uetz]
- Save the Sea sinfonia for symphonic band (1997) [25:50; BMC]
- Vonószene (1997) [3’; manuscript]
- Tuphonium for 2 euphoniums & 2 tubas (1997?) [8’; BMC]
- Five Little Movements for brass (1998) [9:30; BMC]
- Concerto for symphonic band (1998) [19’; BMC]
- Concerto for saxophone quartet & symphonic band (1998) [10’; BMC]
- Vjenne (History of Vriezenveen) concerto for symphonic band (1998) [18:30; BMC]
- Concerto for Oboe No. 2 for oboe & wind ensemble (1999) [15’; BMC]
- Birthday Concerto for trombone & symphonic orchestra (1998) [13’; BMC]
- Fantasy for violoncello solo & wind ensemble (1998) [15’; BMC]
- AX-FANTASY for alto saxophone solo & symphonic band (1998) [10’; BMC]
- SAXOPHONIA for alto saxophone & symphonic band (1998) [10’; BMC]
- Swiss Rhapsody for symphonic band (1998) [10:30; BMC]
- Missouri Overture for symphonic band (1999) [10’; BMC]
- Concerto for Bassoon No. 2 for bassoon & wind ensemble (1999) [14:30; Stormworks Europe]
- Double Concerto for oboe, bassoon & wind ensemble (2000) [11’; Stormworks Europe]
- Magic Oregon for symphonic band (2000) [15’; BMC]
- Adagietto for baritone sax & string orchestra (2000) [4’15”; manuscript]
- Megkésett hangok for solo flute (2000?) [4’; manuscript]
- Te deum for symphonic band, mixed choir, 3 soprano solos & organ (2000) [10’; Stormworks Europe]
- Intelmek oratorio for symphonic orchestra, man’s choir, tenor, bass & narrator (2000) [manuscript]
- Violina for violin & wind ensemble (2001) [13’; Stormworks Europe]
- Piano Concerto No. 1 (arranged for wind band) (2002) [22’; Stormworks]
- Black Russian for symphonic band (2002) [5’; Stormworks Europe]
- Concerto for Flute No. 3 for flute & string orchestra (2002) [12’; manuscript]
- Double Concerto for two flutes & string orchestra (2002) [12’; ?]
- Fantasy for symphonic band (2003) [8’; Stormworks]
- Fájdalmas könyörgés / Disconsolate Prayer for string orchestra (2004) [7’; manuscript]
