= Culture of Hungary =

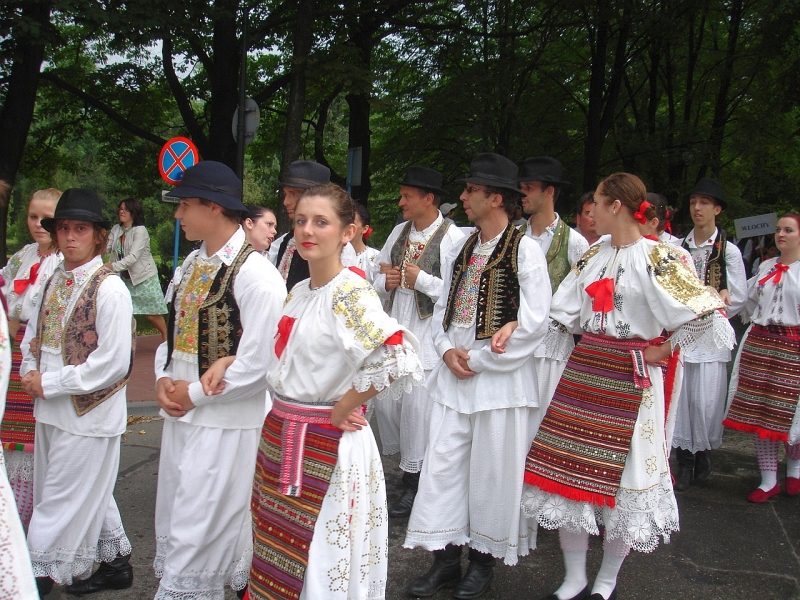
Hungarian folk dance group in traditional clothing

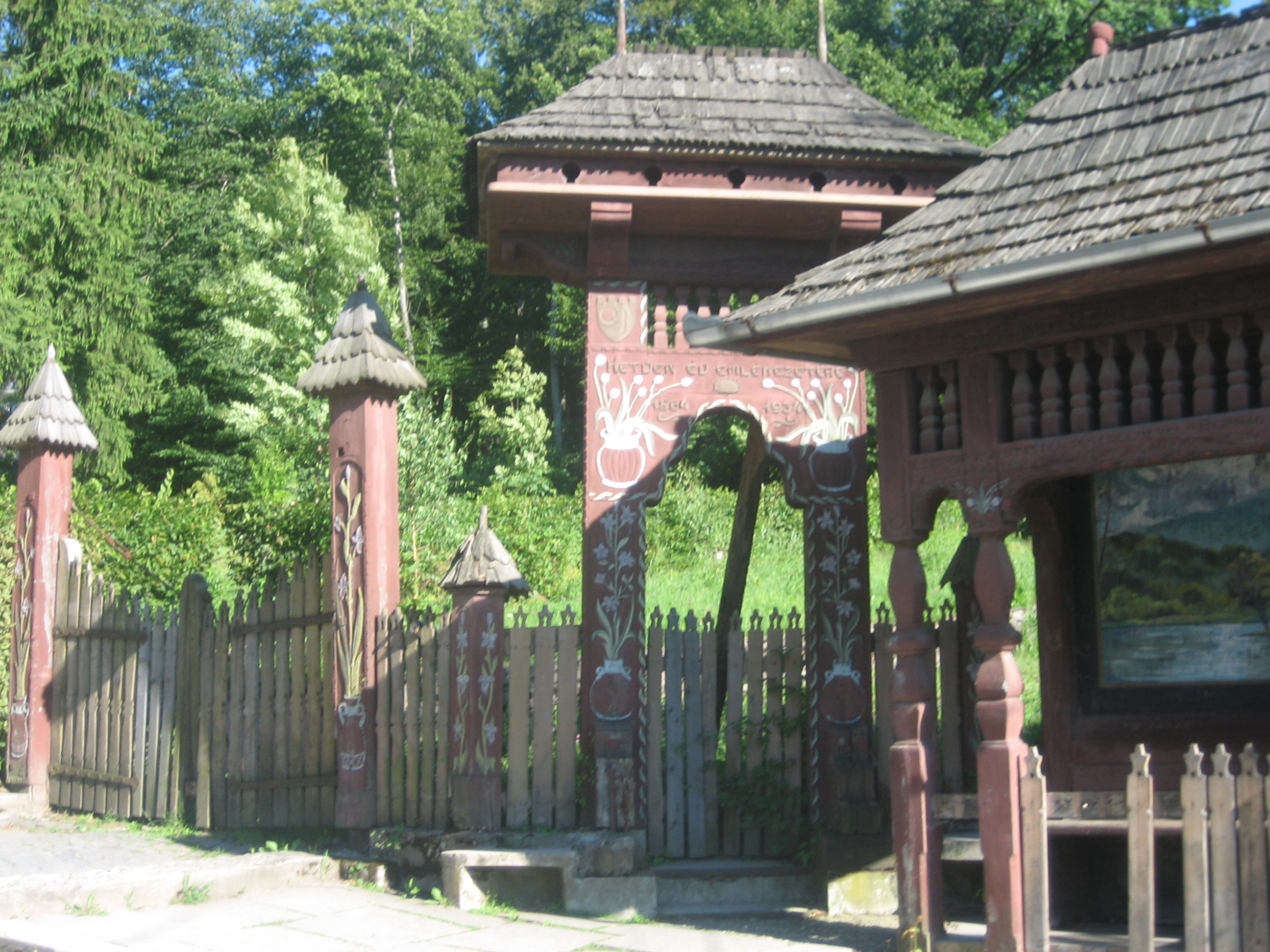
A Székely gate (székelykapu) in Sovata, Transylvania, Romania - a town with an ethnic Hungarian majority

Hungarian culture, also known as Magyar culture, is characterized by its distinctive cuisine, folk traditions, poetry, theatre, religious customs, music and traditional embroidered garments. Hungarian folklore traditions include tales, music, dance, decorated pottery, carvings and embroidery. Historically, Hungarian music has largely consisted of folk music and classical pieces. Whilst the Hungarian language is classified as Ugric, Hungarian culture exhibits enduring Turkic elements, stemming not only from being under Ottoman rule, but also from earlier interactions and affiliations with Turkic peoples. Noted Hungarian authors include Sándor Márai, Imre Kertész, Péter Esterházy, Magda Szabó and János Kodolányi. Imre Kertész is particularly noteworthy for having won the Nobel Prize in Literature in 2002. Hungarian culture is also influenced by Romani culture.

== Architecture ==
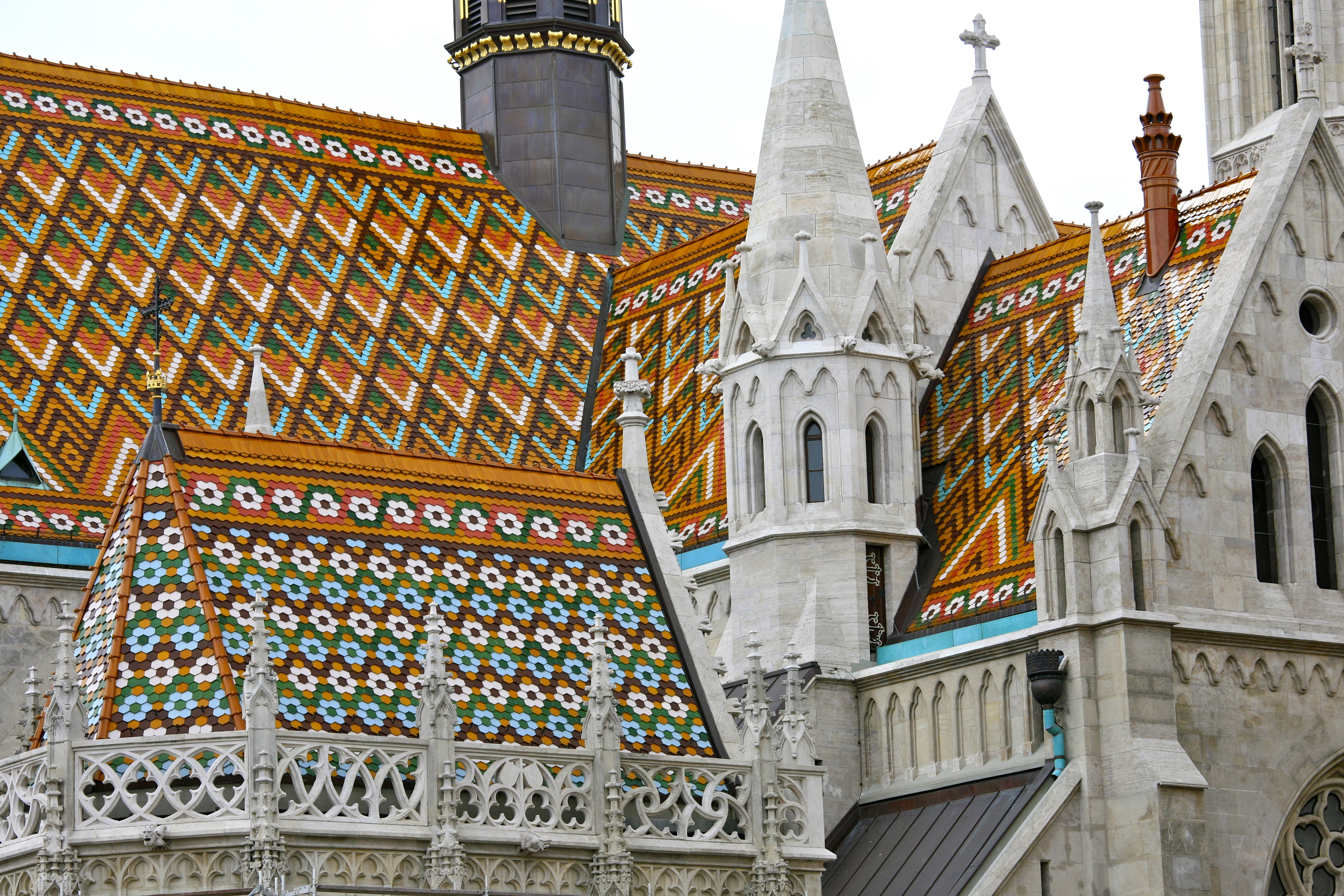
The Matthias Church in Budapest

Hungary is home to:

- Dohány Street Synagogue, the largest synagogue in Europe, and the second largest in the world after the Jerusalem Great Synagogue
- Széchenyi Medicinal Bath, the largest medicinal bath in Europe
- Esztergom Basilica, the third-largest church in Europe
- Pannonhalma Archabbey, the second-largest territorial abbey in the world
- Gödöllő, the second-largest Baroque castle in the world
- Pécs, the largest Myles Necropolis outside Italy

== Music ==
Franz Liszt
Franz Liszt: Hungarian Rhapsody No. 2
Franz Liszt: Hungarian Rhapsody No. 2

Hungarian folk music is a prominent part of the national identity and continues to play a major part in the country’s music. It often features a strong dactylic rhythm due to the Hungarian language consistently putting stress on the first syllable of each word. It also exhibits an enduring Turkic influence. Hungarian music is also influenced by Romani music.

Prominent Hungarian classical music composers include Franz Liszt, Franz Schmidt, Leó Weiner, Ernő Dohnányi, Béla Bartók, Zoltán Kodály, György Ligeti, Miklós Rózsa. Hungary also has a number of renowned composers of contemporary classical music including György Kurtág, Péter Eötvös and Zoltán Jeney, among others.

Franz Liszt spoke no Hungarian until 1870, when he started to learn the language, but clearly identified himself as Hungarian and founded the Academy of Music. Béla Bartók was also born in the former Kingdom of Hungary. György Ligeti was born in Transylvania, after the region was transferred to Romania. Both György Ligeti and Béla Bartók studied at the Liszt Academy before moving abroad, where a large portion of their work was written.

Broughton claims that Hungary's "infectious sound has been surprisingly influential on neighbouring countries (thanks perhaps to the common Austro-Hungarian history) and it's not uncommon to hear Hungarian-sounding tunes in Romania, and Slovakia. The Busójárás carnival in Mohács is a major Hungarian folk music event, formerly featuring the long-established and well-regarded Bogyiszló orchestra.

Hungarian classical music has long been an "experiment, made from Hungarian antedecents and on Hungarian soil, to create a conscious musical culture [using the] musical world of the folk song". Although the Hungarian upper class has long had cultural and political connections with the rest of Europe, leading to an influx of European musical ideas, the rural peasants maintained their own traditions, so that by the end of the 19th century Hungarian composers could draw on rural peasant music to (re)create a Hungarian classical style. For example, Béla Bartók and Zoltán Kodály, two of Hungary's most famous composers, are known for using folk themes in their music. Bartók collected folk songs from across Central Europe, including Romania and Slovakia, whilst Kodály was more interested in creating a distinctively Hungarian musical style.

During the era of Communist rule in Hungary (1944–1989), a Song Committee examined and censored popular music for traces of subversion and ideological impurity. Since then, however, the Hungarian music industry has begun to recover, producing successful performers in the fields of jazz such as trumpeter Rudolf Tomsits, pianist-composer Károly Binder, and in a modernized form of Hungarian folk, Ferenc Sebő and Márta Sebestyén. Hungary has had several popular rock bands such as Illés (with creating the hungarian rock music), Metró, or Omega.

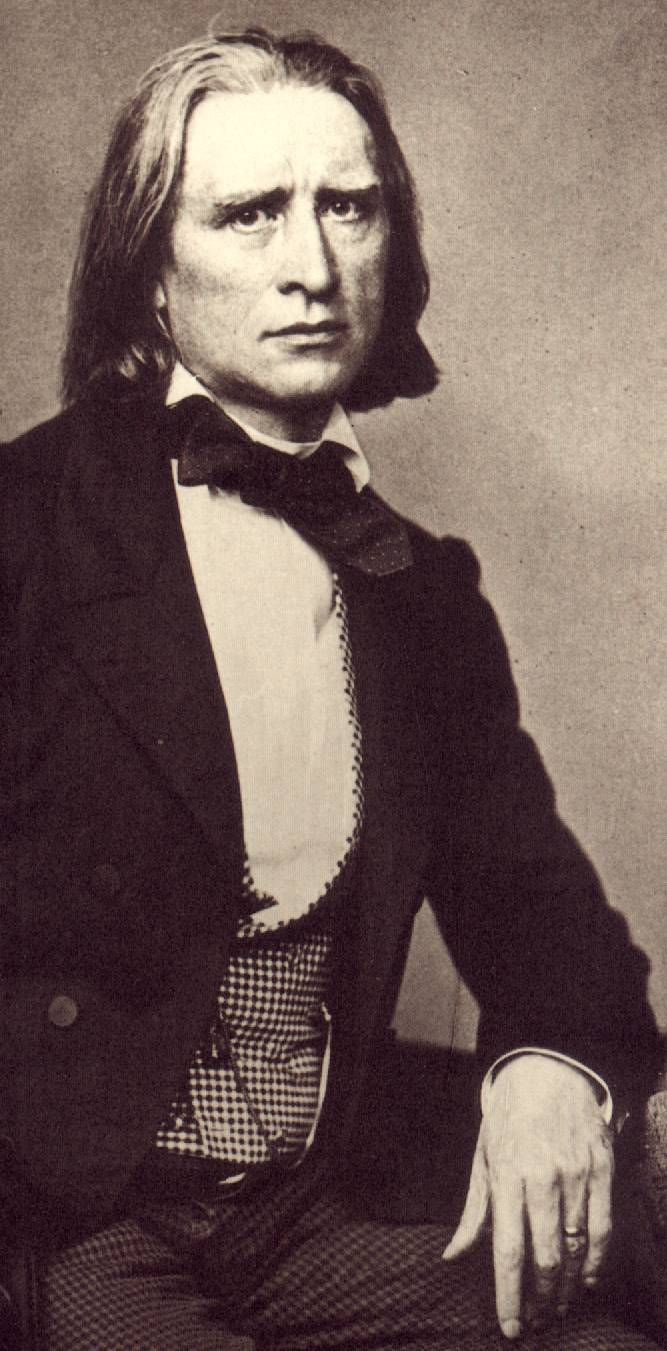
Franz Liszt, Hungarian composer and pianist (1811–1886)

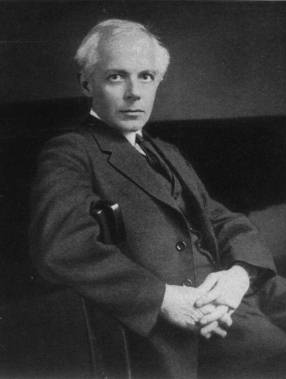
Béla Bartók, Hungarian composer (1881–1945)

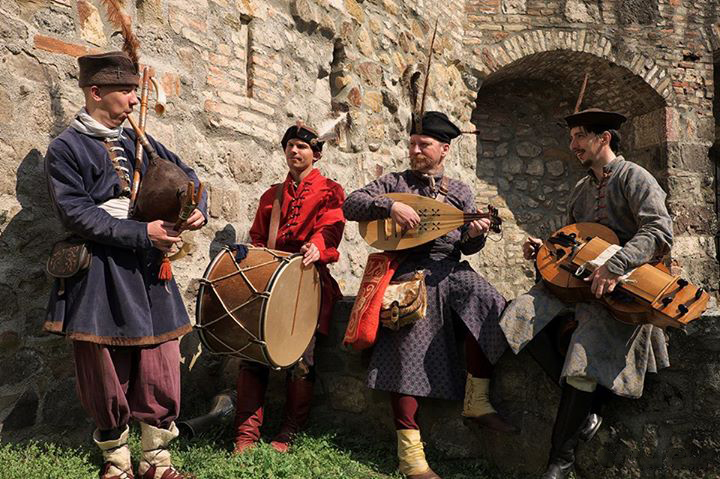
Hungarian folk music band Héttorony Hangászok

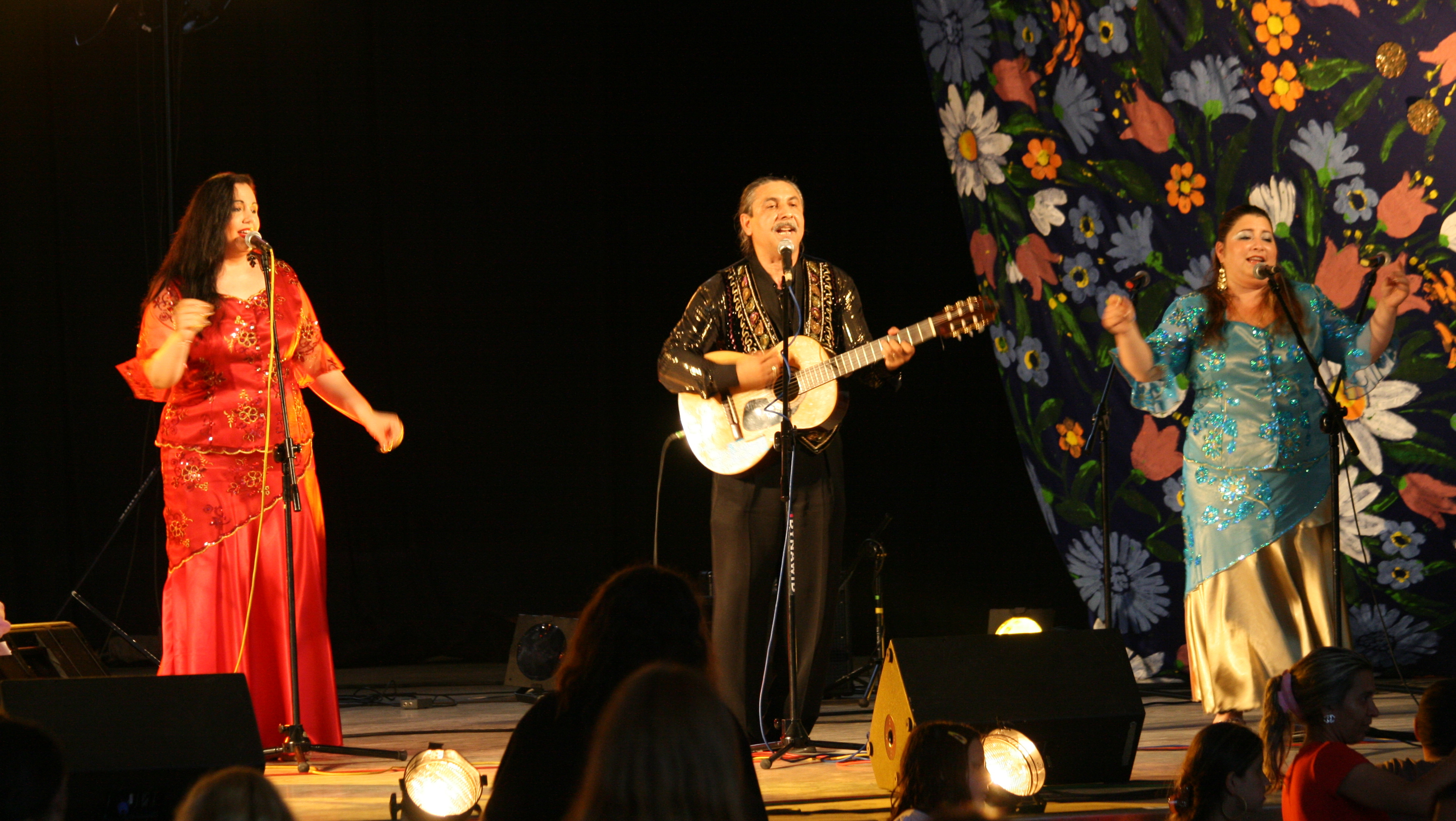
Romani folk music band Kalyi Jag

== Literature ==
In earliest times, the Hungarian language was written in a runic-like script (Hungarian: Rovásírás) derived from the Old Turkic Script. The country switched to the Latin alphabet after being Christianized under the reign of Stephen I of Hungary (1000–1038). There are no surviving documents from before the 11th century.

The oldest written record in Hungarian is a fragment in the Establishing charter of the abbey of Tihany (1055) which, while mostly written in Latin, contains several Hungarian terms, among them the words feheruuaru rea meneh hodu utu rea, "up the military road to Fehérvár". The oldest complete text is the Funeral Sermon and Prayer (Halotti beszéd és könyörgés) (1192–1195), a translation of a Latin sermon. The oldest poem is the Old Hungarian Laments of Mary (Ómagyar Mária-siralom), also a translation from Latin, albeit a flawed one, from the 13th century. It is also the oldest surviving Uralic poem.

Among the first chronicles of Hungarian history were Gesta Hungarorum ("Deeds of the Hungarians") by the unknown author usually called Anonymus, and Gesta Hunnorum et Hungarorum ("Deeds of the Huns and the Hungarians") by Simon Kézai, both written in Latin. These chronicles are a blend of history and legends, so they are not always historically accurate. Another chronicle is the Képes krónika (Illustrated Chronicle), which was written for Louis the Great.

Renaissance literature flourished under the reign of king Matthias Corvinus (1458–1490). Janus Pannonius—even though he wrote in Latin—is considered one of the most important writers in Hungarian literature; he was also the only significant Hungarian Humanist poet of the period. The first printing house was founded during Matthias' reign by András Hess in Buda. The first book printed in Hungary was the Chronica Hungarorum.

Matthias Corvinus' library, the Bibliotheca Corviniana, was among Europe's greatest collections of secular historical chronicles and philosophical and scientific works in the 15th century. In 1489, Bartolomeo della Fonte of Florence wrote that Lorenzo de Medici had founded his own Greek-Latin library after being inspired by the example of the Hungarian king. Matthias Corvinus' library is now part of UNESCO World Heritage. Two other important figures of the Hungarian Renaissance are poets Bálint Balassi and Sebestyén Tinódi Lantos.

The most important poets of the period following the reign of King Matthias were Bálint Balassi (1554–1594) and Miklós Zrínyi (1620–1664). Balassi's poetry, reflecting medieval influences, can be divided into three groups: love poems, war poems, and religious poems. Zrínyi's most significant work, the epic Szigeti veszedelem ("Peril of Sziget", 1648–49) is written in a fashion similar to the Iliad. In the poem Zrínyi recounts the heroic Battle of Szigetvár where his great-grandfather died while defending the castle of Szigetvár. Among religious works, the most important is the Bible translation by Gáspár Károli, the Protestant pastor of Gönc, which was completed in 1590. This translation is called the Bible of Vizsoly after the town where it was first published. (See Hungarian Bible translations for more details.)

The Hungarian enlightenment followed about fifty years after the Western European enlightenment, reaching Hungary through Vienna. The first writers of the Hungarian enlightenment were, among others, Maria Theresa's bodyguards György Bessenyei and János Batsányi. The greatest poets of this period were Mihály Csokonai Vitéz and Dániel Berzsenyi. The enlightenment prompted a reform of the Hungarian language. The greatest figure in this reform was Ferenc Kazinczy. Beginning at that time, Hungarian became useful for scientific writing, and many words were coined to name new inventions.

Hungarian literature has recently gained renown outside the borders of Hungary, mostly through German, French and English translations. Some modern Hungarian authors have become popular in Germany and Italy, especially Sándor Márai, Péter Esterházy, Péter Nádas, and Imre Kertész. Kertész is a contemporary Jewish writer and Holocaust survivor who won the Nobel Prize for literature in 2002.

The classics of Hungarian literature have remained largely unknown outside Hungary. János Arany, a famous 19th-century poet, is still much loved in Hungary, especially his collection of ballads. Arany is among several other "true classics" including Sándor Petőfi, the poet of the Revolution of 1848, Endre Ady, Mihály Babits, Dezső Kosztolányi, Attila József, and János Pilinszky. Other Hungarian authors are Ferenc Móra, Géza Gárdonyi, Zsigmond Móricz, Gyula Illyés, Albert Wass, and Magda Szabó. Vilmos Kondor has created a new trend in recent years, and is mentioned as the creator of Hungarian noir (see Budapest Noir).

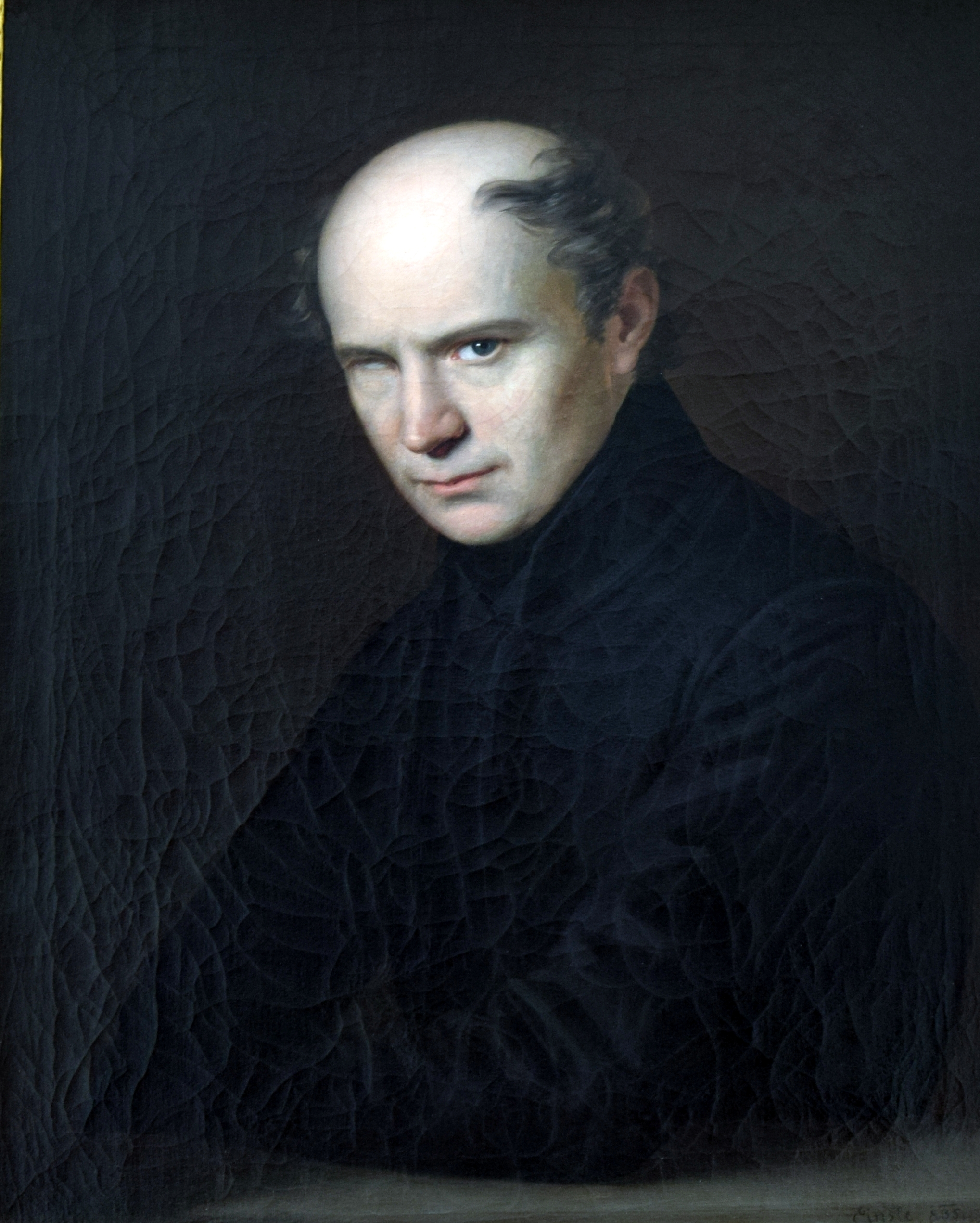
Ferenc Kölcsey, author of the lyrics of the Hungarian national anthem

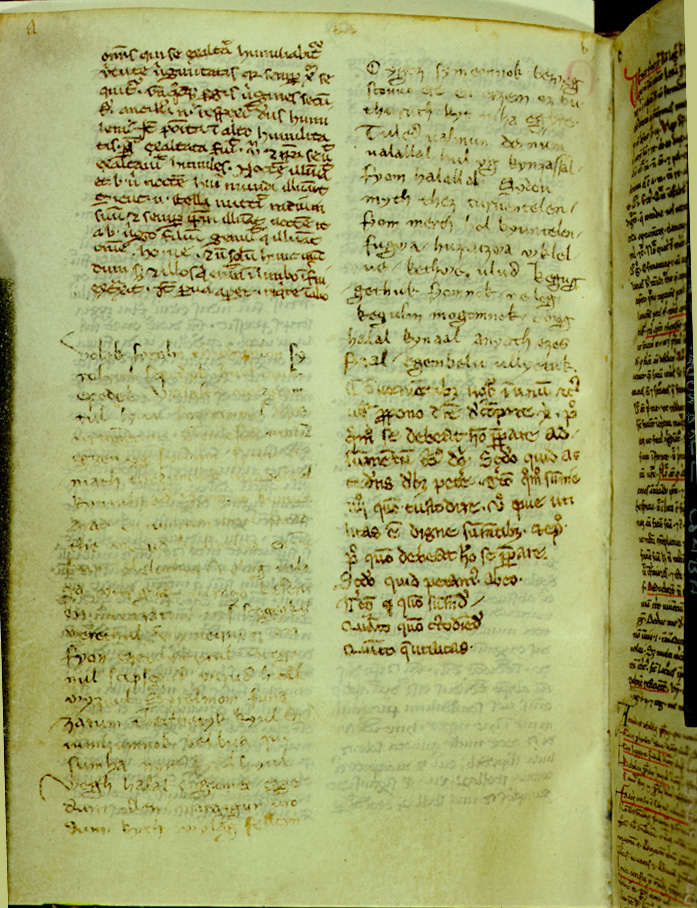
The oldest surviving Hungarian poem, Old Hungarian Laments of Mary

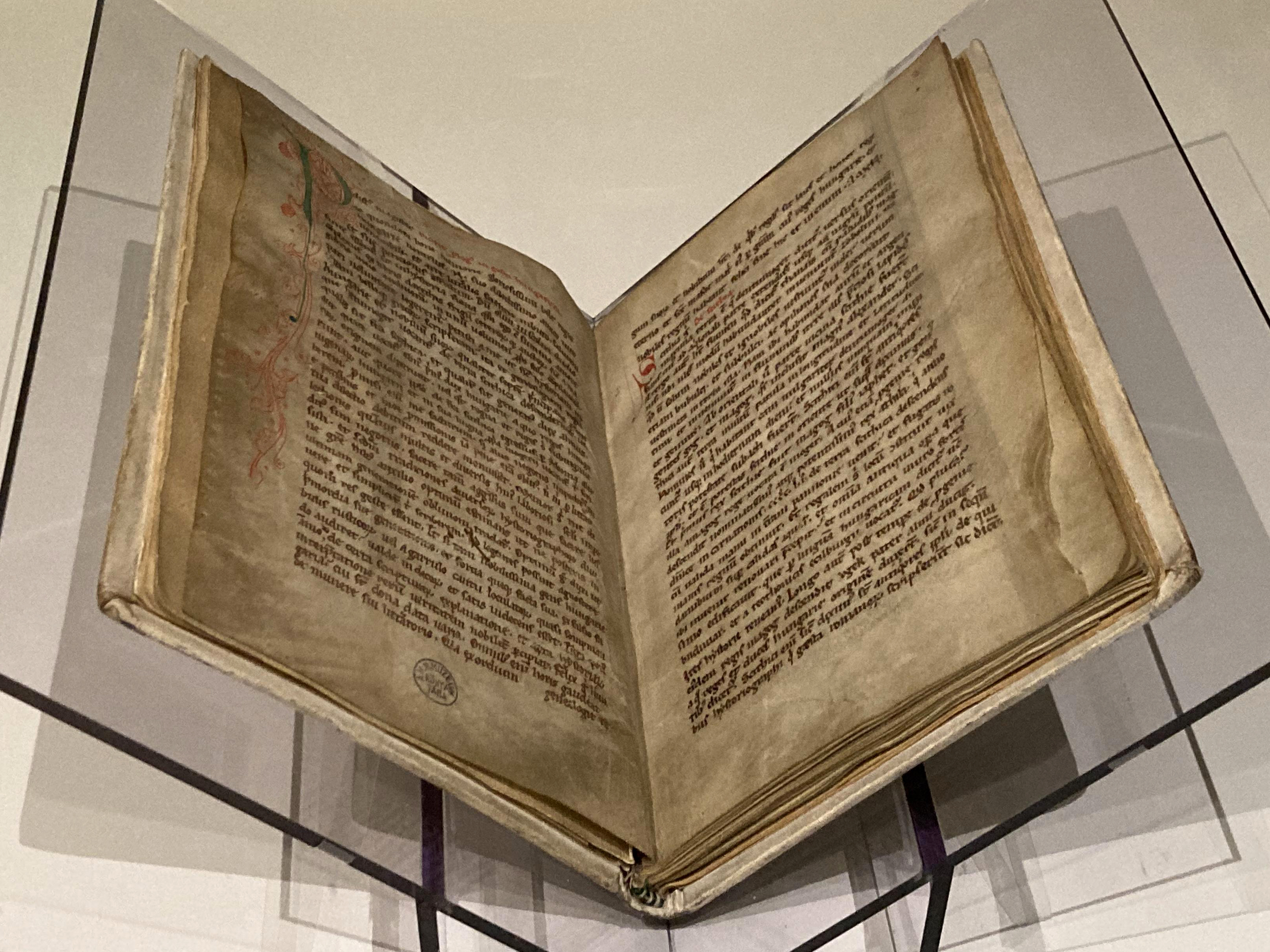
Gesta Hungarorum, the first extant Hungarian book about history

The Illuminated Chronicle from the court of King Louis the Great of Hungary from 1358

== Film ==
Many Hungarians have contributed to film art and its technology, but, due to political reasons, many of them found it was easier to find success abroad. As of 2018, Hungarians working in Hollywood and some in Hungary had received more than 150 Academy Award nominations and about 46 Academy Awards. Already in the 1930s there were 17 Hungarian nominations, but the peak was in the decade of the 1940s when about 51 nominations and 13 to 15 Academy Awards were given to exiled Hungarians. The best year was 1944 with 9 to 10 nominations and four (Michael Curtiz, Paul Lukas, George Pal, and William S. Darling) Academy Awards. The first Hungarian to be nominated was Lajos Bíró (1929) and the first to win the award was William S. Darling (1933). Art Direction might be the most successful category concerning wins/nominations: Paul Groesse 3/11, William S. Darling 3/7, Joseph Kish 1/5, Vincent Korda 1/4, Alexandre Trauner 1/2 and Marcel Vertès 1/1. The number of nominees and awards in all categories, exceeds all other nations, counted per capita.

Hungarians emigrated in large numbers after several disasters following the First World War (1918) when neighbouring countries—Romania, Yugoslavia and Czechoslovakia—occupied parts of the former Kingdom of Hungary, which lost two-thirds of its territory in a 1920 treaty. There was a brief communist takeover accompanied by a so-called ″red terror″ and then a reaction against it called the ″white terror″, which disrupted the economy. At that time Hungarian filmmakers tried their fortunes abroad, first, as did Géza von Bolváry, in the German-speaking world and later in the English-speaking world. Film with sound was invented (1918) in Germany by Dénes Mihály. Béla Gáspár invented, 1932, the first full color one-strip film: Gasparcolor patented in 1933. With the advent of racial laws in 1939, Jewish citizens were forced to leave the country to find work. It is ironic that some of the most successful propaganda films during the Second World War for both sides were directed by Hungarians: Münchhausen by Josef von Báky and "Pimpernel" Smith by Leslie Howard. With another, longer-lasting, communist takeover in 1948, more Hungarians left. After the crushed 1956 revolution, more important filmmakers left, including Vilmos Zsigmond, László Kovács, Jean Badal and Peter Medak. Following the amnesty of 1960, the cultural climate eased somewhat.

Nevertheless, despite the hardships of staying at home, some Hungarians received Academy Award nominations (21 times for 24 people up to 2018) and in some cases the actual Award (Ferenc Rofusz (1980), István Szabó (1981), Zsuzsa Böszörményi (1991) and co-winners Jászberényi, Perlaki and Priskin (2010), and co-winners Imre Major and Csaba Kőhegyi in 2014. The first Hungarian to be nominated from Hungary was Tamás Czigány, for best short documentary in 1967.

The best-known Hungarian film to date is Mephisto, by István Szabó. It won an Academy Award in the category Best Foreign Language film. The year before, in 1980, The Fly, an animation by Rofusz, became the very first Hungarian film to receive an Academy Award. The Foreign Student Academy Award went to Zsuzsa Böszörményi (1991). In 2010 the trio Márk Jászberényi, Tamás Perlaki and Gyula Priskin obtained the scientific and engineering award for Lustre, a software program to color-correct intermediates in real time, first used on The Lord of the Rings. In 2014, the same prize went to three Hungarians, Tibor Madjar, Imre Major and Csaba Kőhegyi. Up to 2018, ten films have been nominated in the category Best Foreign Language Film: four nominations to István Szabó (the most nominated person in Hungary), two to Zoltán Fábri (1969, 1979) and one each to Imre Gyöngyössy, Barna Kabay and Károly Makk, and On Body and Soul (2018). Three films have been nominated for Best Short Animation (Marcell Jankovics, Ferenc Rófusz and Géza M. Tóth). Cinematographer Lajos Koltai has been nominated for best cinematography in 2000. In 2016, Son of Saul won the second Best Foreign Language Film AA for Hungary. In 2017 Hungary won the best short feature category with Mindenki. In 2018, Hungary got its 10th nomination in the category Best Foreign Language Film for On Body and Soul by Ildikó Enyedi. The most successful film around 2019 is Eternal Winter by Atilla Szász. Those Who Remained was shortlisted for Best Foreign film 2020.

=== Famous Hungarians in the film industry ===
==== Hollywood ====
Cinematographers László Kovacs ASC, Andrew László ASC. Andrew Marton directed the chariot race in Ben-Hur for which he won a Golden Globe. Joe Eszterhas wrote Basic Instinct and became the highest-paid writer in Hollywood history. He also wrote the Berlin Golden Bear winner "Music Box" and the first Hungarian "blockbuster", Children of Glory. Zoltan Elek won AA-award (1986) for make-up. Actors of Hungarian origin are Peter Lorre, Paul Newman (10 AA nominations: 59, 62, 64, 68–69, 82–83, 86–87, 95, 99 and 2003)/one win 87 plus one honorary award 86 and 99 win), Tony Curtis (1 AA nomination), Johnny Weissmüller (Tarzan) and Béla Lugosi (Dracula), Franciska Gaal, Ilona Massey, Zsa Zsa Gabor. Hedy Lamarr was half-Hungarian as was Ali MacGraw nominated (71) (Love Story), Adrien Brody (1 AA), Goldie Hawn (1 AA), Marton Csokas and Isabelle Huppert, one nomination (2017).

==== Great Britain ====
- Alexander Korda founded London films in order to compete with Hollywood on the same terms. He produced The Third Man with music of Anton Karas.
- Producer Gabriel Pascal got one nomination (1939) for Pygmalion co-directed and starred by Leslie Howard.

==== Germany ====
- Géza von Radványi made 70 mm films to compete with Hollywood.
- Josef von Báky (directed Münchausen)
- Géza von Bolváry
- Géza von Cziffra
- Eduard von Borsody
- Julius von Borsody

==== Israel ====
Ephraim Kishon (b. Ferenc Hoffmann) was Israel's first nominee for best foreign-language film. He got two nominations (1964, 1972).

==== Czechoslovakia ====
Ján Kadár (b. János Kadár) won the first AA for Czechoslovakia (1965).

==== Canada ====
Paul Sarossy is active often as Atom Egoyan's cinematographer.

==== Hungary ====
Some years after the failed revolution of 1956 against the Soviet-dominated communist dictatorship, the cultural climate eased slightly; this led to more creative freedom. Important films in the 1960s were directed by István Gaál: (The Falcons), András Kovács: Hideg Napok (1966), Miklós Jancsó: The Round-Up (1965) (Screenplay: Hernádi Gyula, DOP: Tamás Somló), and István Szabó (The Father). Márton Keleti directed: Franz Liszt: Dreams of Love. (1970) filmed in 70 mm by István Hildebrandt. Other important filmmakers Sándor Pál, Márta Mészáros (Adoption Golden Bear Berlin 1975), Péter Gothár (Golden Lion, Venice): Time Stands Still (Cannes: Award of the Youth, 1982) (1982). Sunshine and Children of Glory are successful bigger budget movies about Hungary's turbulent past. Recent successful films include: János Szász: (Witman fiúk, DOP: Tibor Máthé 1997), György Pálfi: Hukkle (2002), (Taxidermia) (2006). The first super-studio in Hungary was Korda Studios. The next was Raleigh Studios, Budapest. Partly because of this an increasing number of foreign films, mainly with larger budgets, have been shot in Hungary in recent years, especially in Budapest. Budapest has been nicknamed "Hollywood on the Danube" because it is arguably now the most Hollywood-populated place outside the U.S. Steven Spielberg's Munich was also partly shot in Budapest. Most of Guillermo del Toro's Hellboy II was shot in Hungary. Altogether 47 foreign films were shot in Hungary in 2008, and 52 in 2009. In comparison, about 20 to 30 Hungarian movies are made annually.

=== Art movies ===
Hungarians were major pioneers in cinema both in Europe (e.g. Alexander Korda) and in the United States, and they have entered to the formation of the art movie.

István Szőts People of the Mountains won the Venice Biennale in 1942, then Géza Radványi Somewhere in Europe influenced the emerging neorealism.

After World War II the greatest Hungarian film director was Miklós Jancsó who won the first two international film prizes:

- The Round-Up (Szegénylegények), Locarno, FIPRESCI, 1965
- Red Psalm ("Még kér a nép" Sándor Petőfi), Cannes, Best Director Award, 1971
- Hungary won Crystal Globe 2016
- Hungary won Prix Europa (Best European TV Movie or Mini-series of the Year) 2017: Memo
- Hungary won Prix Europa (Best European TV Movie or Mini-series of the Year) 2018: Eternal Winter by Attila Szász
- Main Prize at Braunschweig Int. Film Festival 2018: X by Ujj Mészáros
- Main Prize at Berlin Int. Film Festival 2018: On Body and Soul by Ildikó Enyedi
- Main Prize at Monte Carlo Int. Film Festival 2019: Bad Poems by Gábor Reisz
- Main Prize at Tuburon Int. Film Festival(US) 2019: Eternal Winter, also: Best Director, Screenplay, Actress and Cinematography

== Cuisine ==
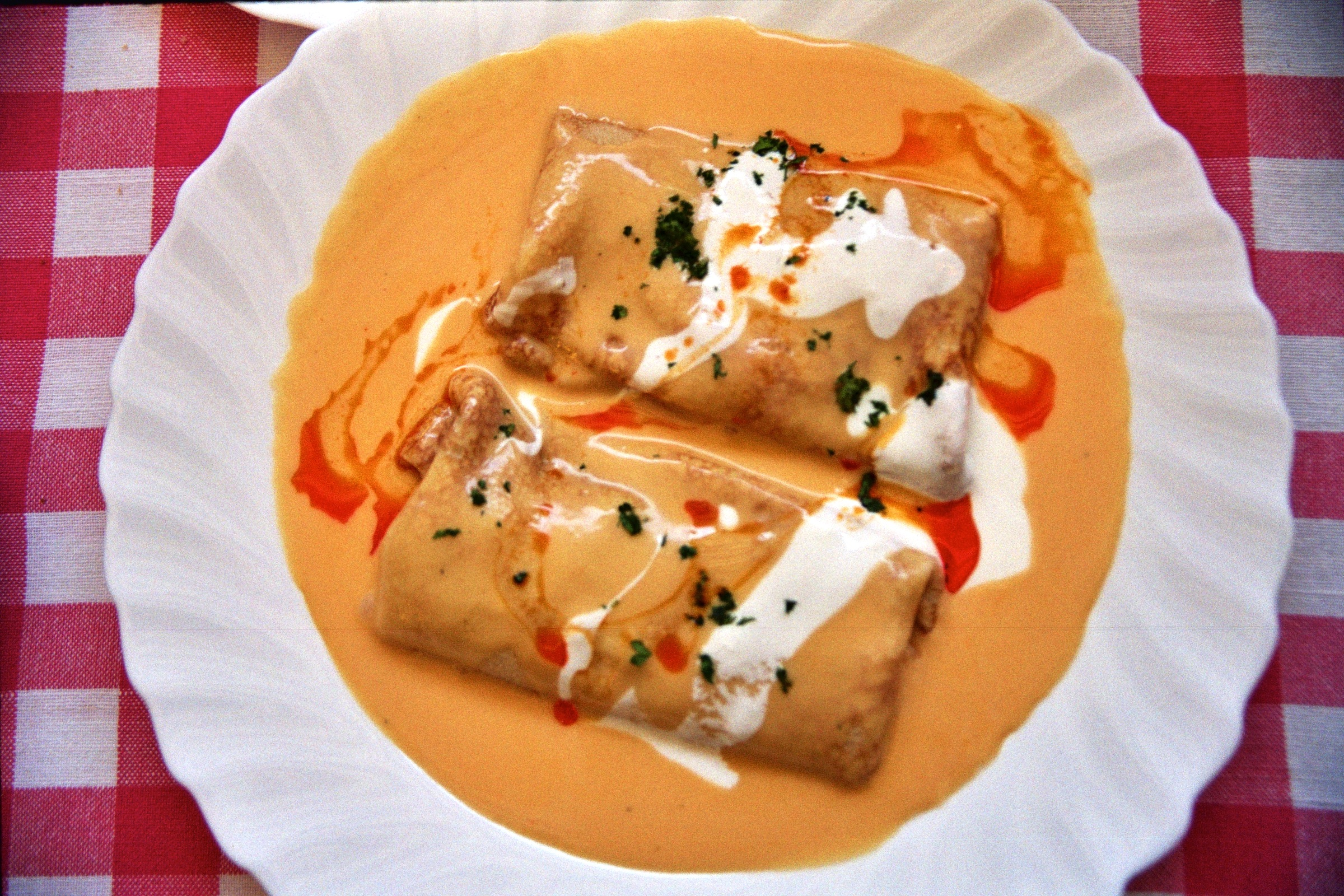
Hortobágyi palacsinta, served in Sopron

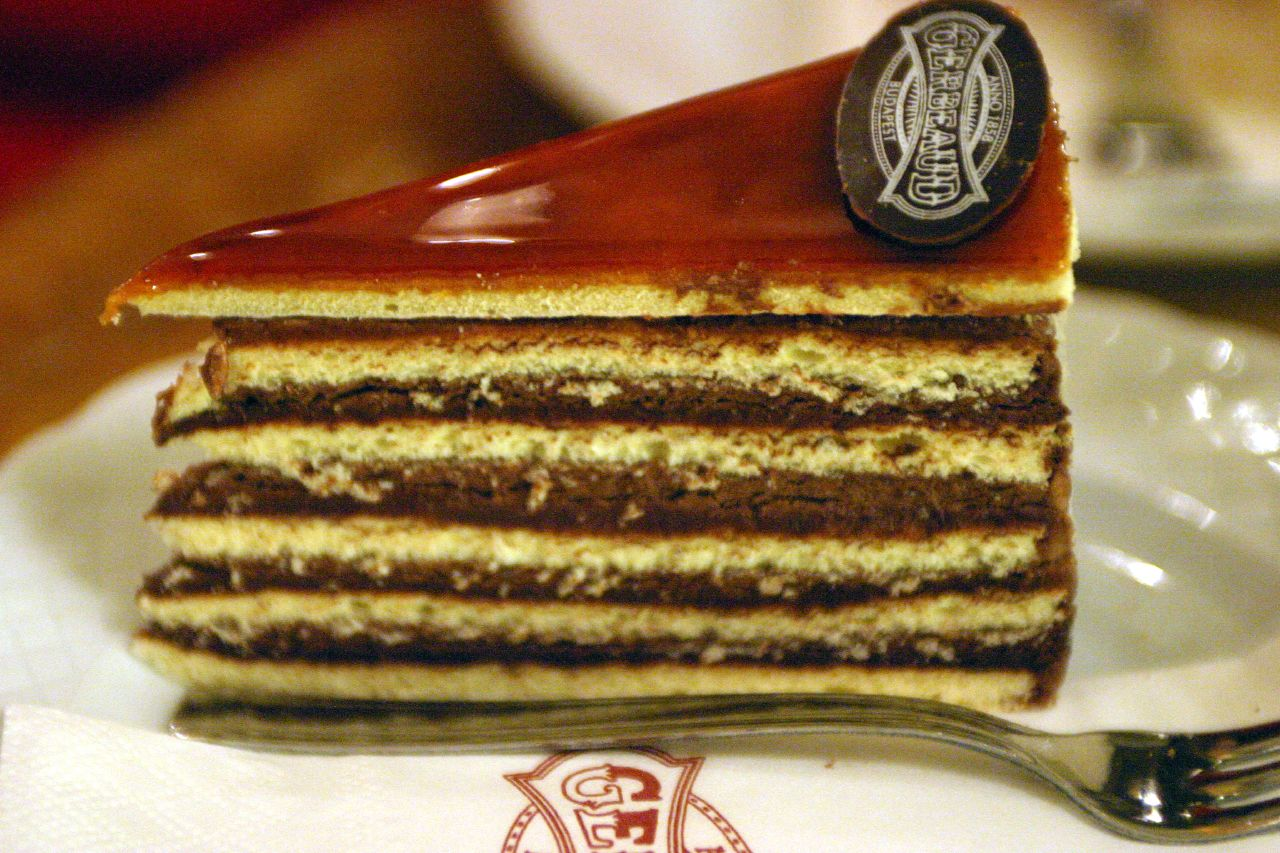
A slice from the Dobos Cake

Traditional dishes such as the world-famous Goulash (gulyás stew or gulyásleves soup) are popular. Dishes are often flavoured with paprika (ground red peppers), a Hungarian innovation. Thick, heavy Hungarian sour cream called tejföl is often used to soften the dish's flavour. The famous Hungarian hot river fish soup called Fisherman's soup or halászlé is usually a rich mixture of several kinds of poached fish.

Other dishes include chicken paprikash, foie gras made of goose liver, pörkölt stew, vadas (game stew with vegetable gravy and dumplings), trout with almonds or salty and sweet dumplings, and túrós csusza, (dumplings with fresh quark cheese and thick sour cream). Desserts include the iconic Dobos Cake, Strudel (rétes), filled with apple, cherry, poppy seeds or cheese, Gundel pancake, plum dumplings (szilvás gombóc), somlói dumplings, dessert soups like chilled sour cherry soup, and sweet chestnut puree (gesztenyepüré) (cooked chestnuts mashed with sugar and rum, split into crumbs, and topped with whipped cream). Perec and kifli are widely popular pastries.

The csárda is the most distinctive type of Hungarian inn, an old-style tavern offering traditional cuisine and beverages. Borozó usually denotes a cozy old-fashioned wine tavern, pince is a beer or wine cellar, and a söröző is a pub offering draught beer and sometimes meals. The bisztró is an inexpensive restaurant often with self-service. The büfé is the cheapest place, although one may have to eat standing at a counter. Pastries, cake, and coffee are served at a cukrászda, while an eszpresszó is a cafeteria.

=== Alcoholic beverages ===
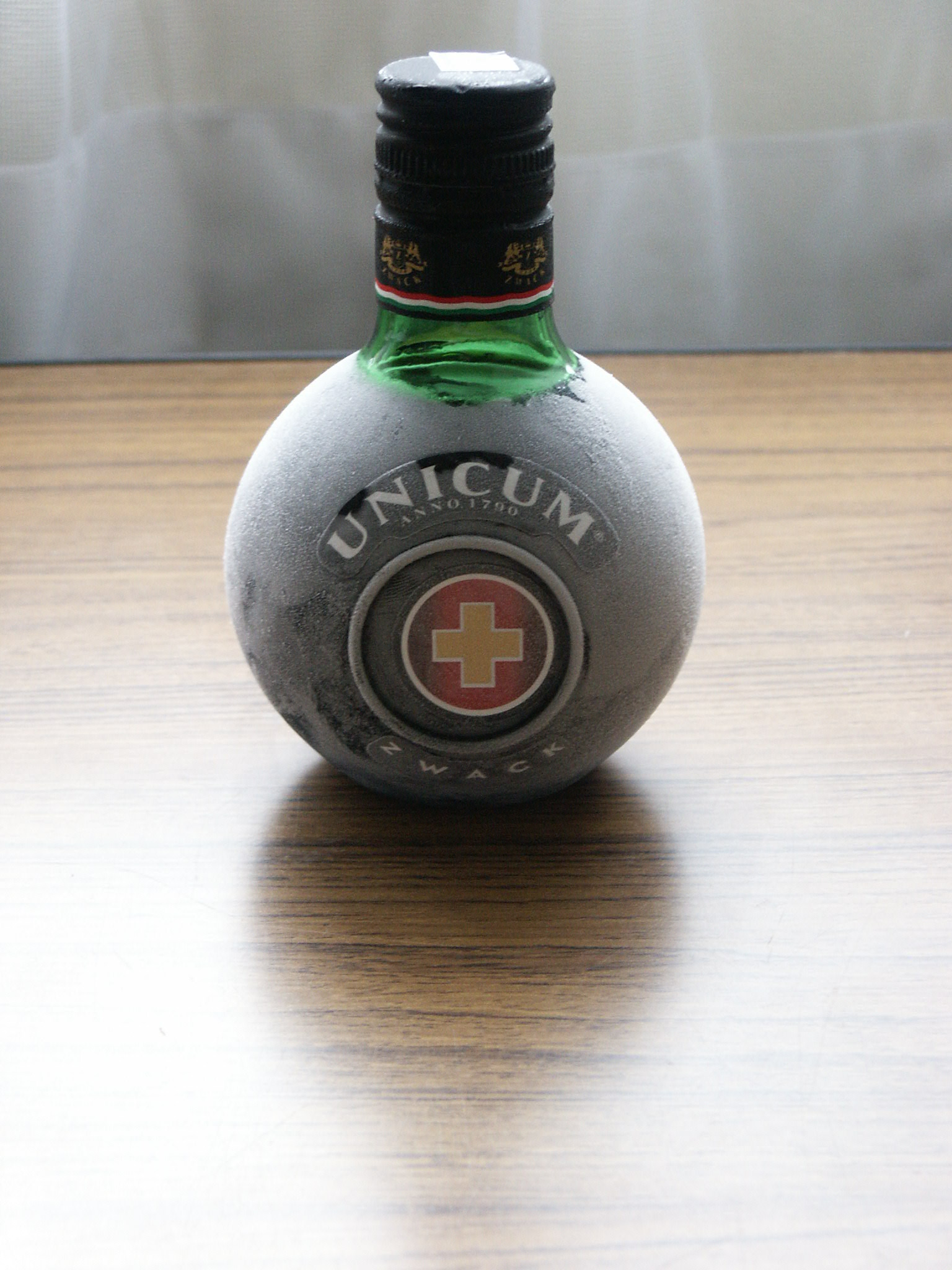
A cold bottle of Unicum

Pálinka: Pálinka is a fruit brandy, distilled from fruit grown in the orchards of the Great Hungarian Plain. It is a spirit native to Hungary, and comes in a variety of flavours including apricot (barack) and cherry (cseresznye). However, plum (szilva) is the most common flavour. Though many flavours are available, pálinka made of strawberries or walnut are considered to be a rare and expensive delicacy; variations also include pálinka sweetened with honey or fruit beds under the liquid.

Wine: As Hugh Johnson says in The History of Wine, the territory of Hungary is ideal for wine-making. Since the fall of communism, there has been a renaissance of Hungarian wine-making. The choice of good wine is widening from year to year. The country can be divided to six wine regions, which include North-Transdanubia, Lake Balaton, South Pannonia, Duna-region or Alföld, Upper Hungary and Tokaj-Hegyalja. Hungarian wine regions offer a great variety of style, of which the main products of the country are elegant and full-bodied dry whites with good acidity, although complex sweet whites (Tokaj), elegant (Eger) and full-bodied robust reds (Villány and Szekszárd). The main varieties are Olaszrizling, Hárslevelű, Furmint, Pinot gris or Szürkebarát, Chardonnay (whites), Kékfrankos (or Blaufrankisch in German), Kadarka, Portugieser, Zweigelt, Cabernet sauvignon, Cabernet franc, and Merlot. The most famous wines from Hungary are Tokaji Aszú and Egri Bikavér.

Tokaji: Tokaji, meaning "of/from Tokaj", is used to label wines from the wine region of Tokaj-Hegyalja. Tokaji wine has received accolades from numerous great writers and composers including Beethoven, Liszt, Schubert, and Goethe; Joseph Haydn's favorite wine was a Tokaji. Louis XV and Frederick the Great tried to outdo one another in the excellence of the vintages they stocked, when they treated guests like Voltaire to some Tokaji. Napoleon III, the last Emperor of the French, ordered 30–40 barrels of Tokaji for the Court every year. Gustav III, King of Sweden, never had any other wine to drink. In Russia, customers included Peter the Great and Empress Elizabeth of Russia.

Zwack Unicum: For over 150 years, a blend of 40 Hungarian herbs has been used to create the liqueur Unicum. Unicum is a bitter, dark-coloured liqueur that can be drunk as an apéritif or after a meal; it is claimed that this helps the digestion. The recipe is held secret by the Zwack family.

Beer: The five main Hungarian breweries are Borsodi, Soproni, Arany Ászok, Kőbányai, and Dreher.

== Spa culture ==
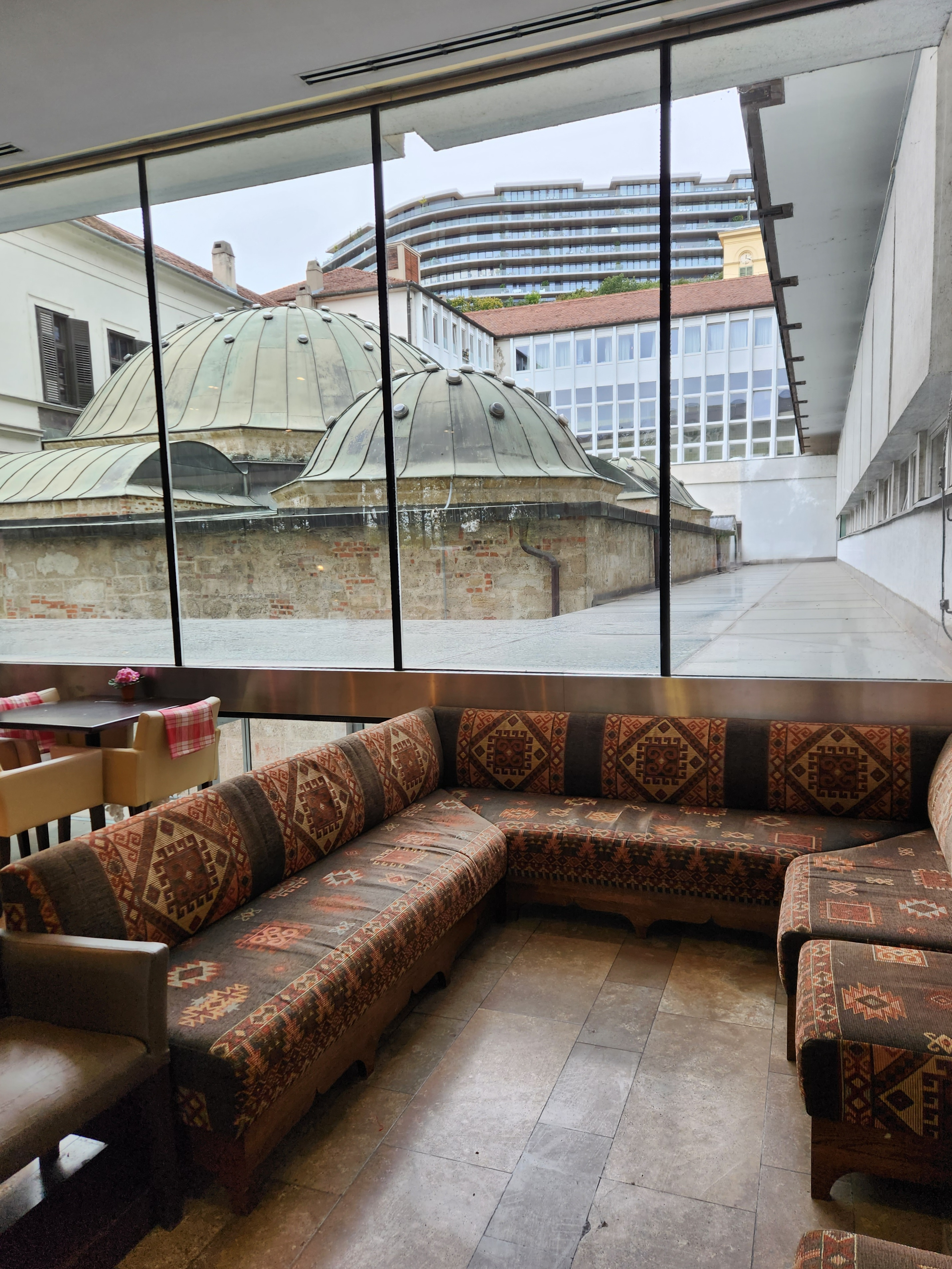
Kubbets of the Veli Bej hamám visible from inside the complex

Hungary has a wealth of thermal springs, supplying numerous thermal baths and spas across the country. Hungarian baths feature Turkish, Roman and Classical architectural styles. Thermal water can be found with good quality and in great quantities on over 80% of Hungary's territory, making it an advantageous geographical location.

The Romans heralded the first spas in the area of present-day Hungary; remains of their bath complexes are still to be seen in Óbuda. Spa culture was significantly revived during the Ottoman rule over Hungary; the Turks used the thermal springs of Buda for the construction of a number of bathhouses, some of which are still functioning (such as Király Baths and Rudas Baths). In the 19th century, advances in deep drilling and medical science provided the springboard for a further leap in bathing culture. Grand spas such as Gellért Baths, Lukács Baths, Margaret Island, and Széchenyi Medicinal Bath are a reflection of this resurgence in popularity. About 1,500 thermal springs can be found in Hungary. About half of these are used for bathing.

The spa culture has a history of nearly 2,000 years in the location of present-day Budapest. Budapest has the richest supply of thermal water among the capitals of the world. There are about 450 public baths in Hungary. Nowadays the trend shows that bath operators are modernizing their facilities and expanding the services offered. A total of 50 of the 160 public baths are qualified as spas throughout the country. Services are offered for healing purposes. These spas provide every type of balneal and physical therapy.

=== The wine-growing terroir of Egerszalók ===
The spa at Egerszalók is noted for its position in one of the principal wine-growing regions of Hungary. Egerszalók is also notable for human-caused geological morphology: when the spa was expanded by the government in 1961, the flow of supersaturated mineral water sharply increased, leading to the deposition of a hillside of shining white travertine.

=== The thermal lake of Hévíz ===
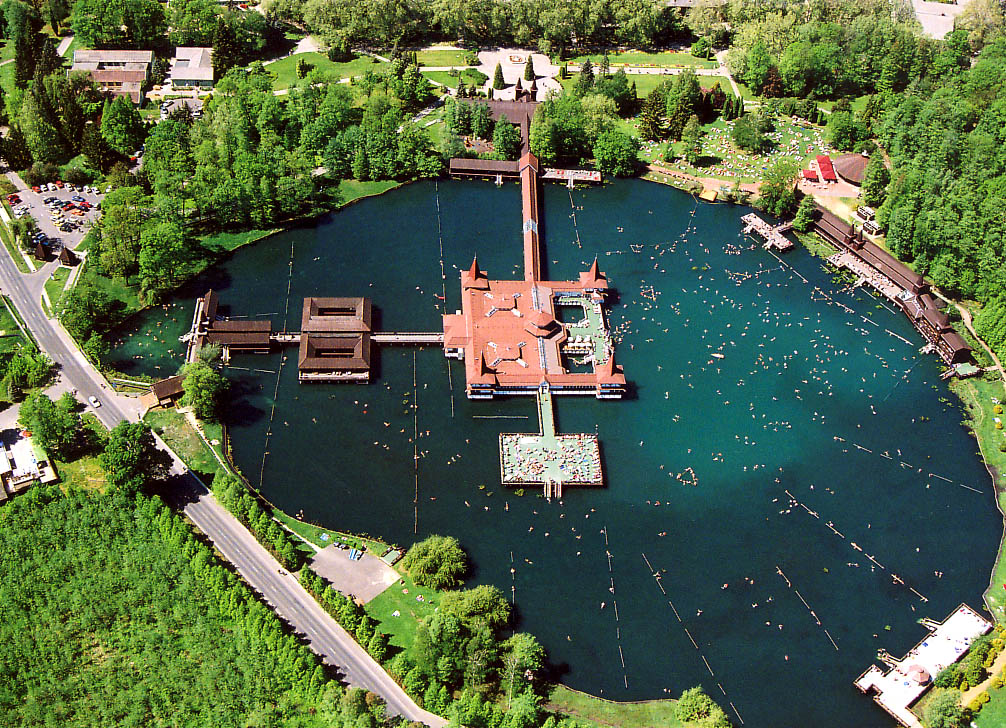
Lake Hévíz

Lake Hévíz is the largest biologically active, natural thermal lake in the world. The oldest and most well-known bath of Hungary, in accordance with records from the Roman era, has a history of 2,000 years. The Hévíz treatment, in its present sense, also dates back more than 200 years.

The 4.4 ha (11 acre) lake is fed by its spring rushing up at a depth of 38 m, containing sulphur, radium, and minerals. Due to the high water output of the spring, the water of the lake is completely changed within 48 hours. The water of the lake is equally rich in dissolved substances and gases, combining the favourable effects of naturally carbonated medicinal waters and those containing sulphur, calcium, magnesium, hydrogen-carbonate, as well as those with a slightly radioactive content. The medicinal Hévíz mud, which is unique of its kind, contains both organic and inorganic substances and the radium-salts and reduced sulphuric solutions in it represent special medicinal factors. The temperature of the water is 23–25 °C in winter and 33–36 °C in summer.

== Csárdák ==
Csárda in Sümeg

A Hungarian csárda (pl. csárdák) is a traditional tavern associated with live folk music, folk dance, light food such as pogácsa and lecsó, and traditional meals such as szárma and tokány. The csárda emerged in the mid-16th century during Ottoman rule, and was initially a simple roadside shelter for travellers across the Great Hungarian Plain. The name csárda is derived from Ottoman Turkish çardak, which referred to a raised, roofed structure.

== Folk dance ==
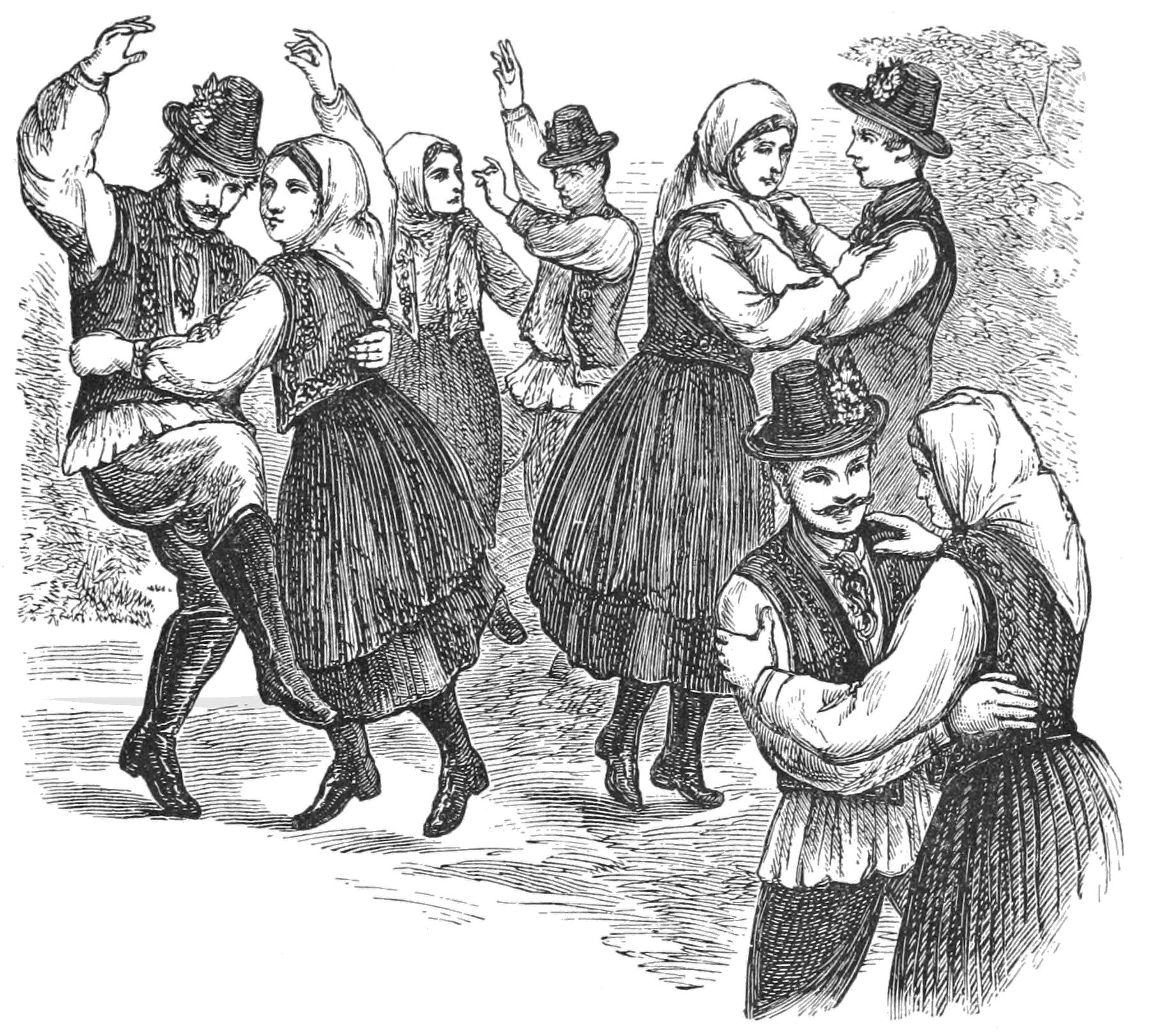
Csárdás

- Ugrós (Jumping dances): Old style dances dating back to the Middle Ages. Solo or couple dances accompanied by old style music, shepherd and other solo man's dances from Transylvania, and marching dances along with remnants of medieval weapon dances belong in this group.
- Karikázó: a circle dance performed by only women, and accompanied by singing of folksongs.
- Csárdás: New style dances developed in the 18th and 19th centuries, is the Hungarian name for the national dances, with Hungarian embroidered costumes and energetic music. From the men's intricate bootslapping dances to the ancient women's circle dances, Csárdás demonstrates the infectious exuberance of the Hungarian folk dancing still celebrated in the villages.
- Verbunkos: a solo man's dance evolved from the recruiting performances of the Austro-Hungarian army.
- The Legényes: It is a men's solo dance done by the ethnic Hungarian people living in the Kalotaszeg region of Transylvania. Although usually danced by young men, it can be also danced by older men. The dance is performed freestyle usually by one dancer at a time in front of the band. Women participate in the dance by standing in lines to the side and sing/shout verses while the men dance. Each lad does a number of points (dance phrases) typically 4 to 8 without repetition. Each point consists of 4 parts, each lasting 4 counts. The first part is usually the same for everyone (there are only a few variations).

== Folk costumes (17th–19th centuries) ==
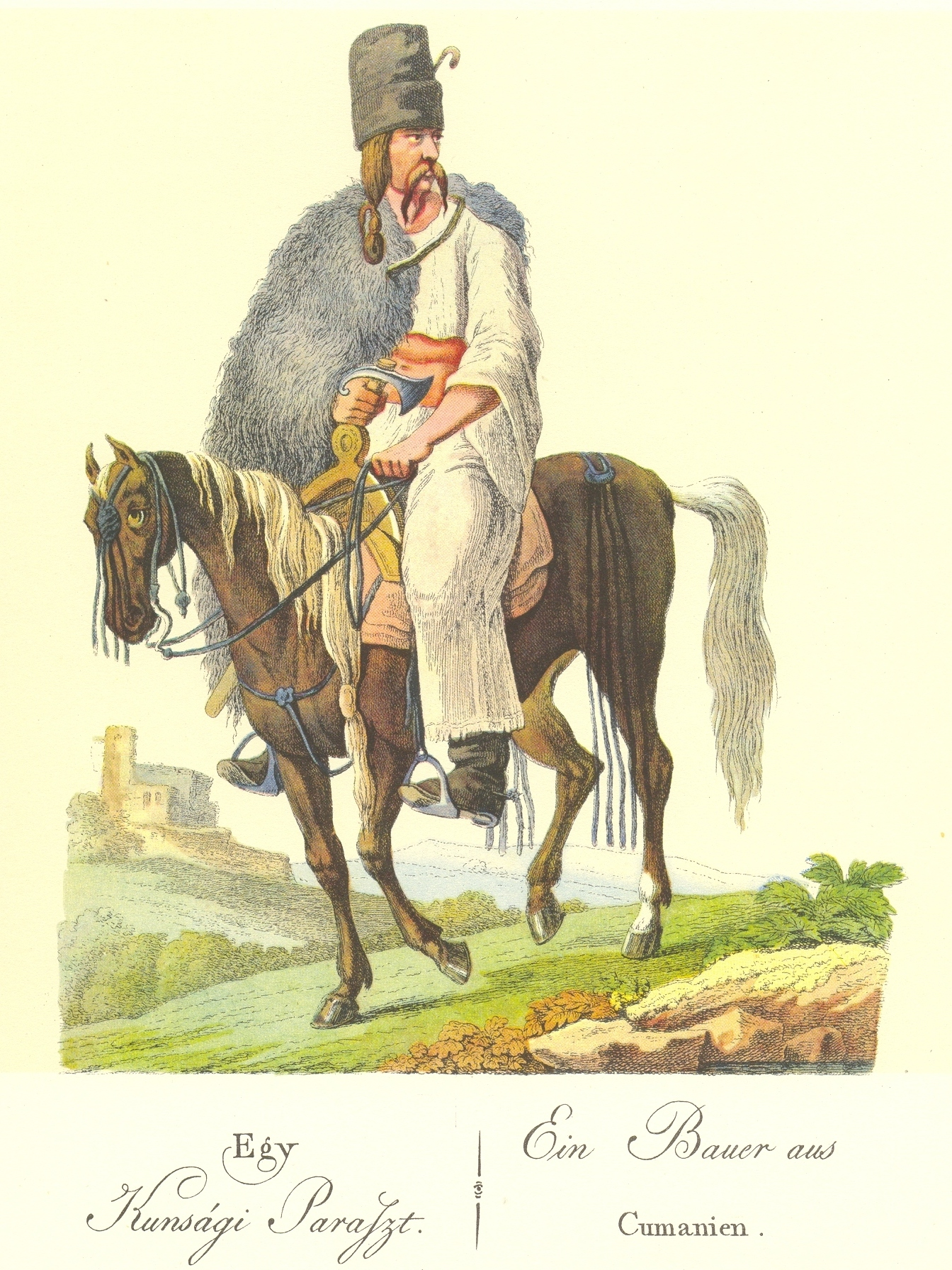

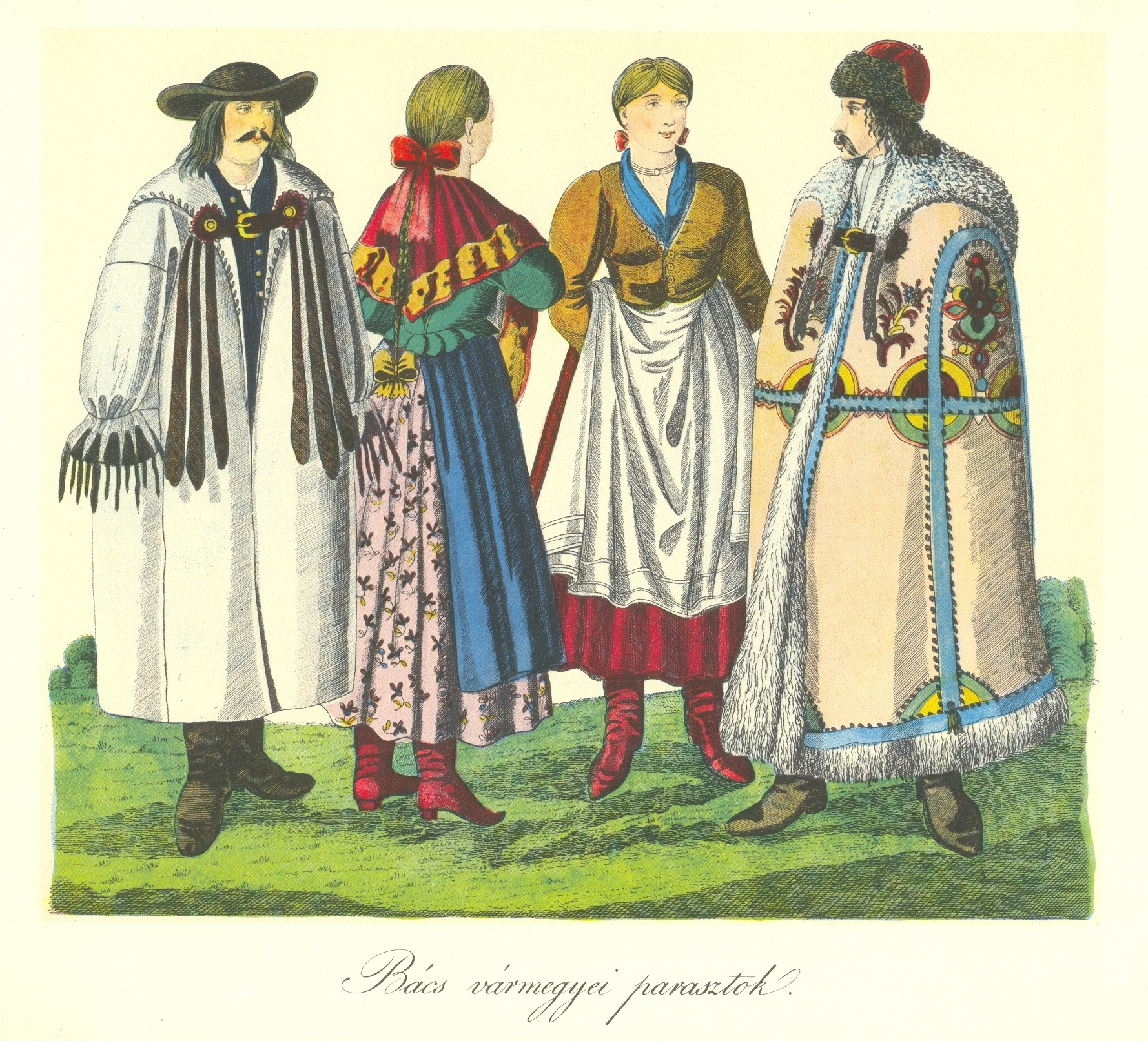

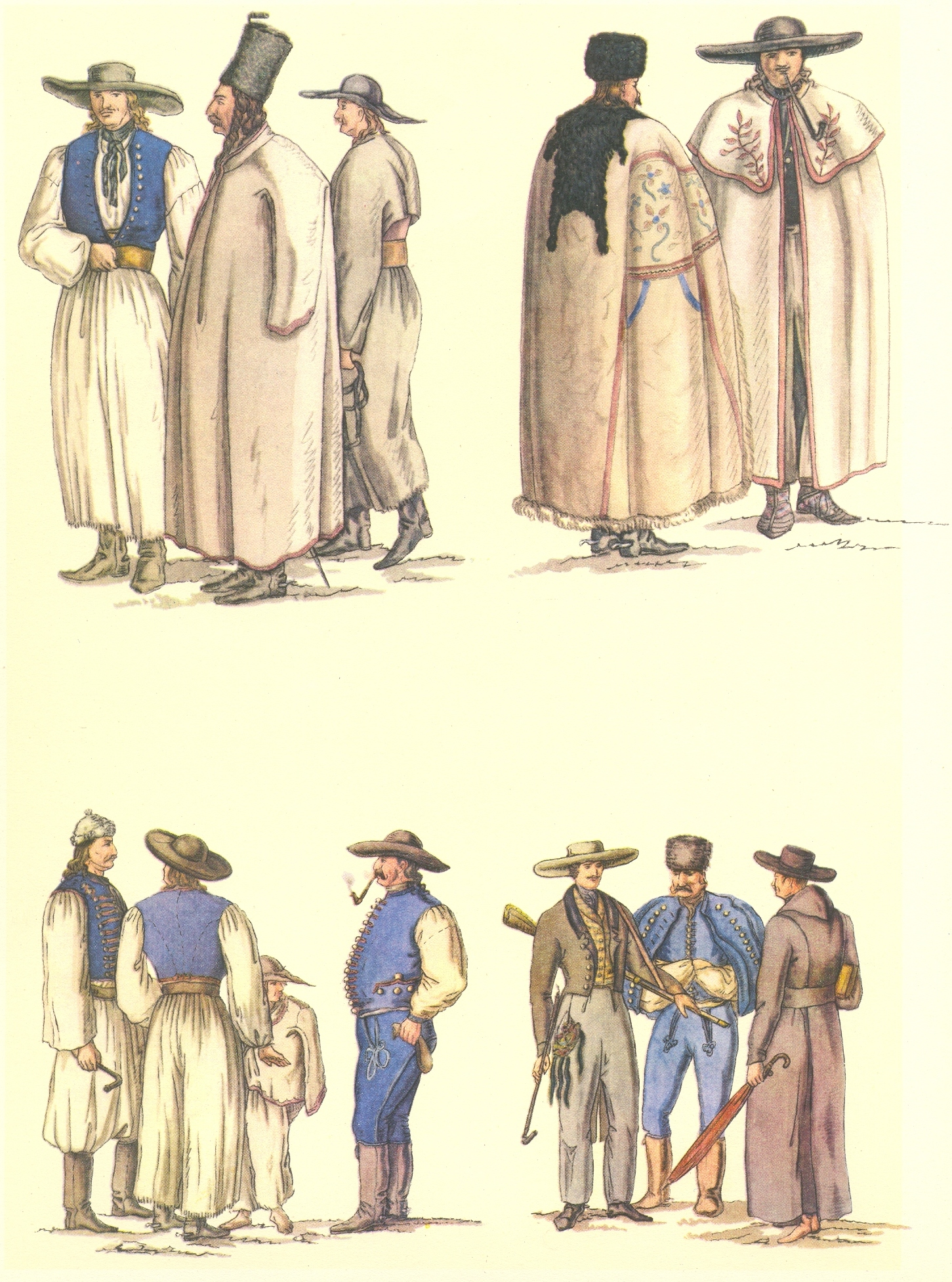

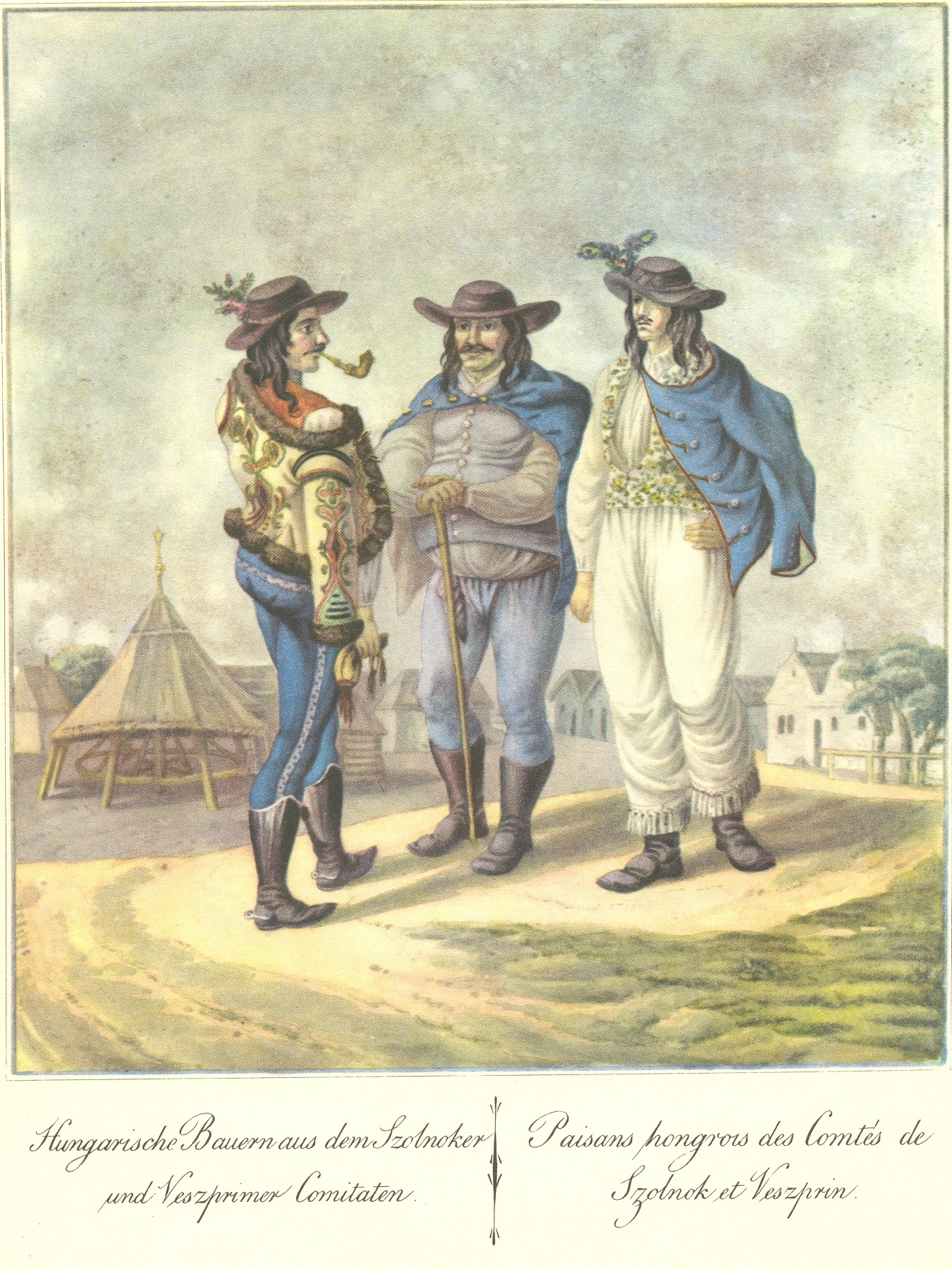

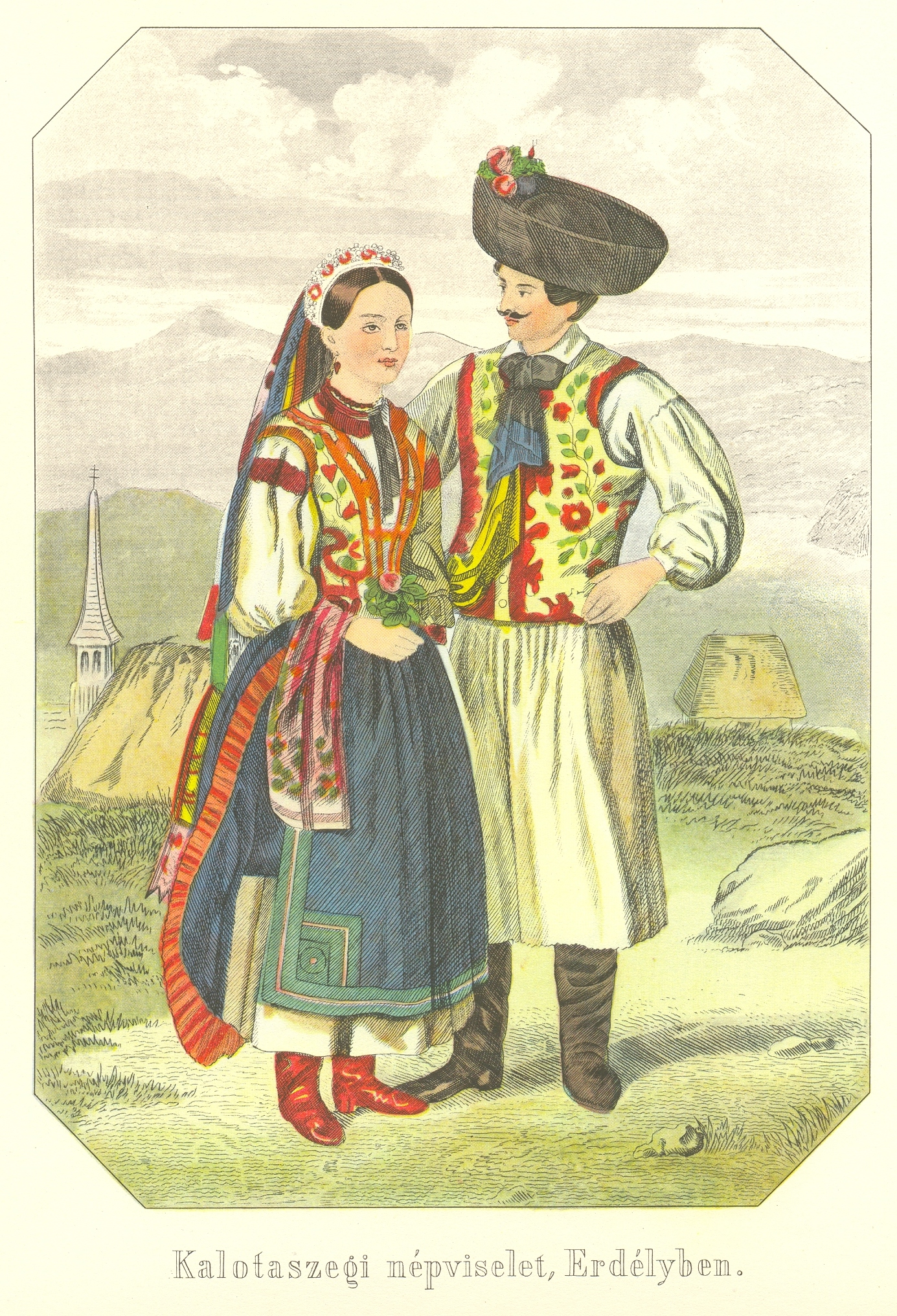

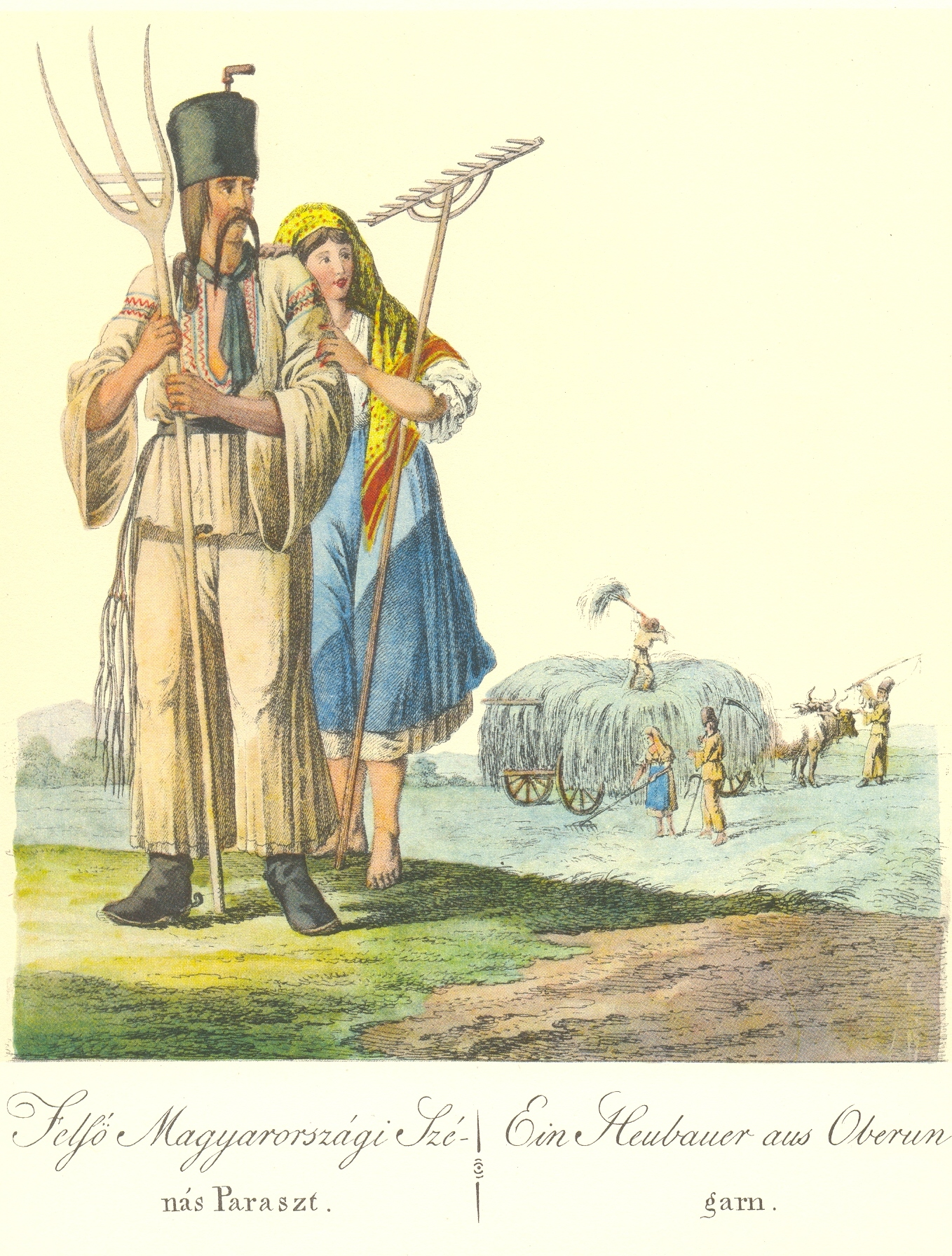

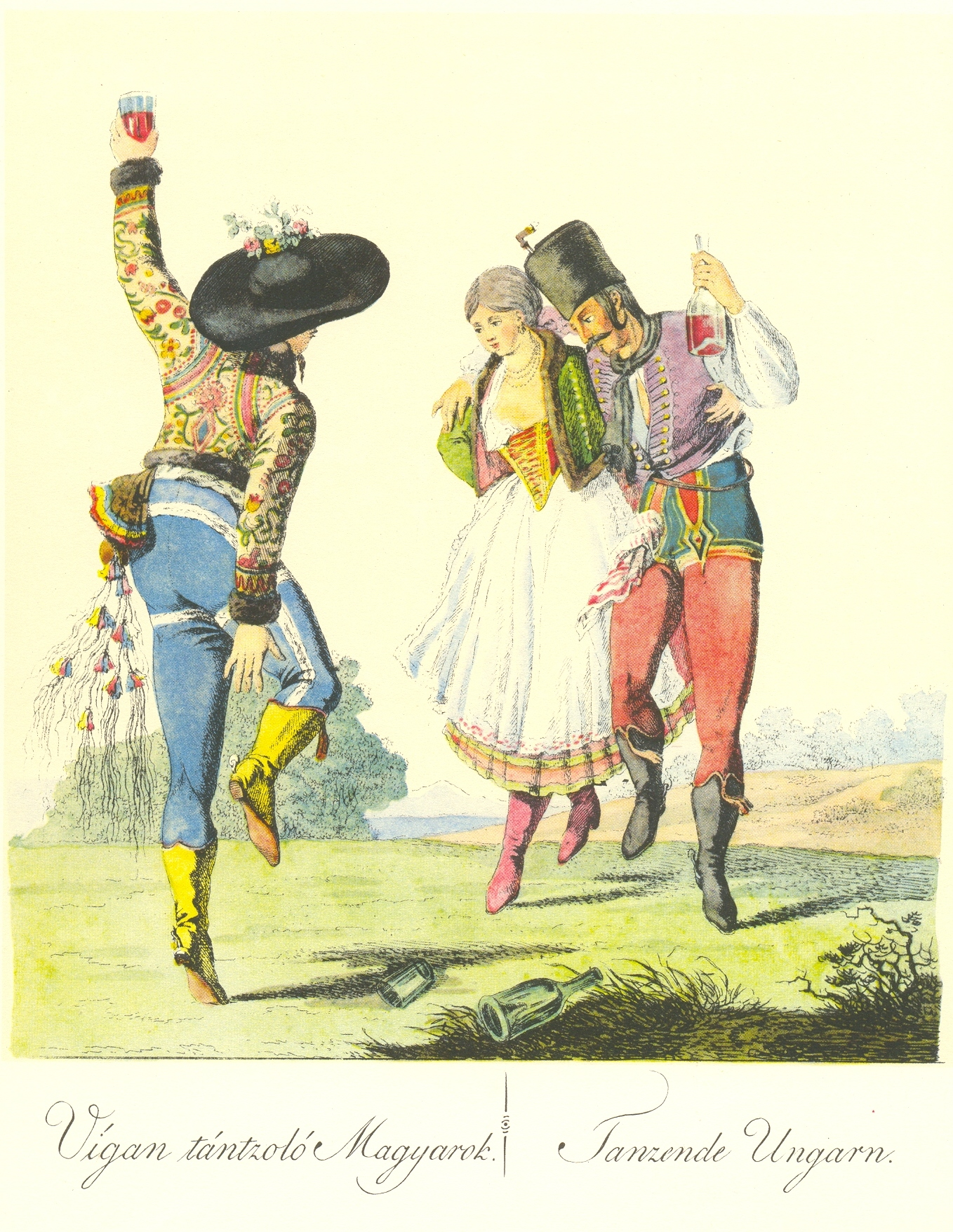

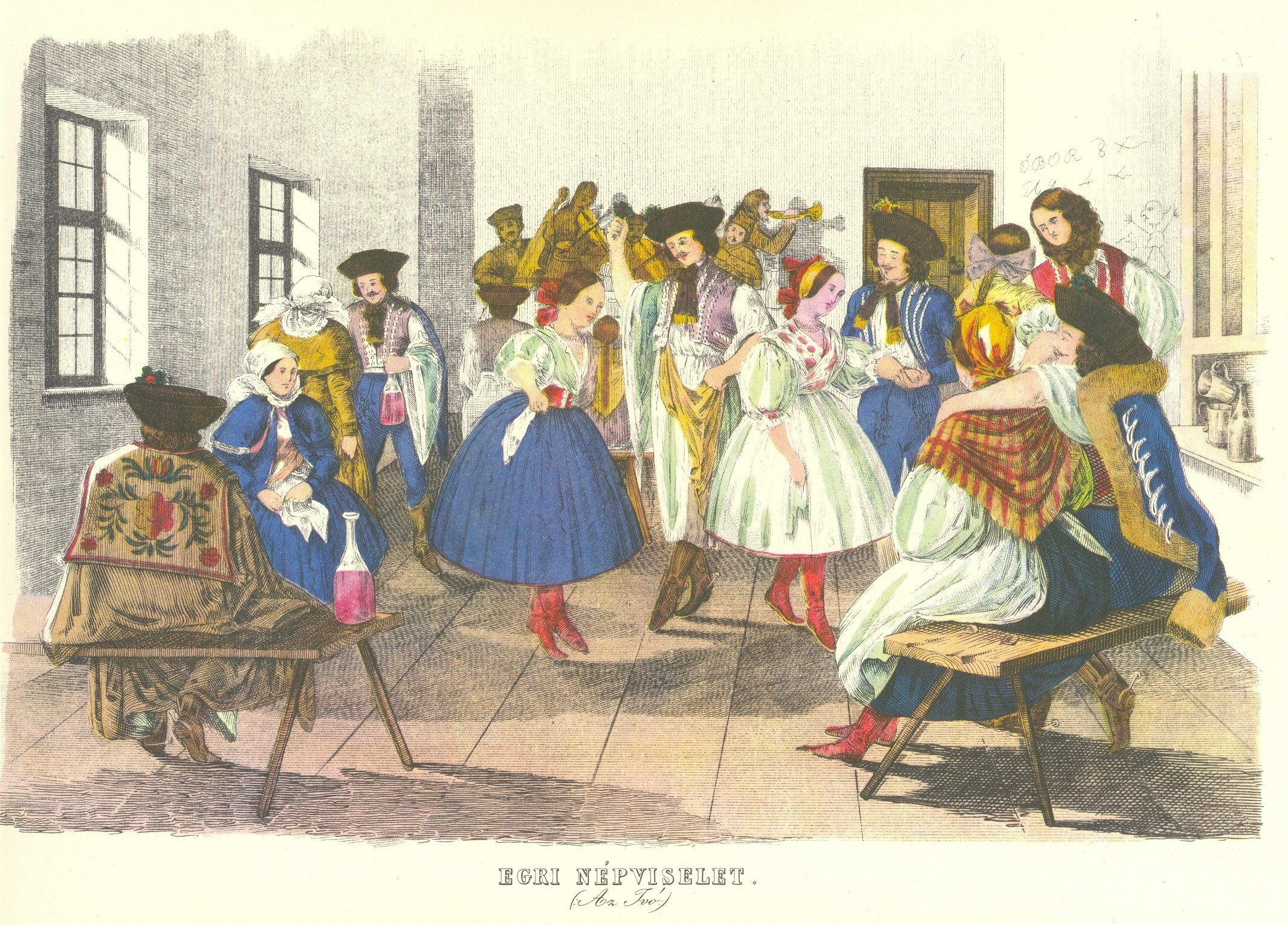

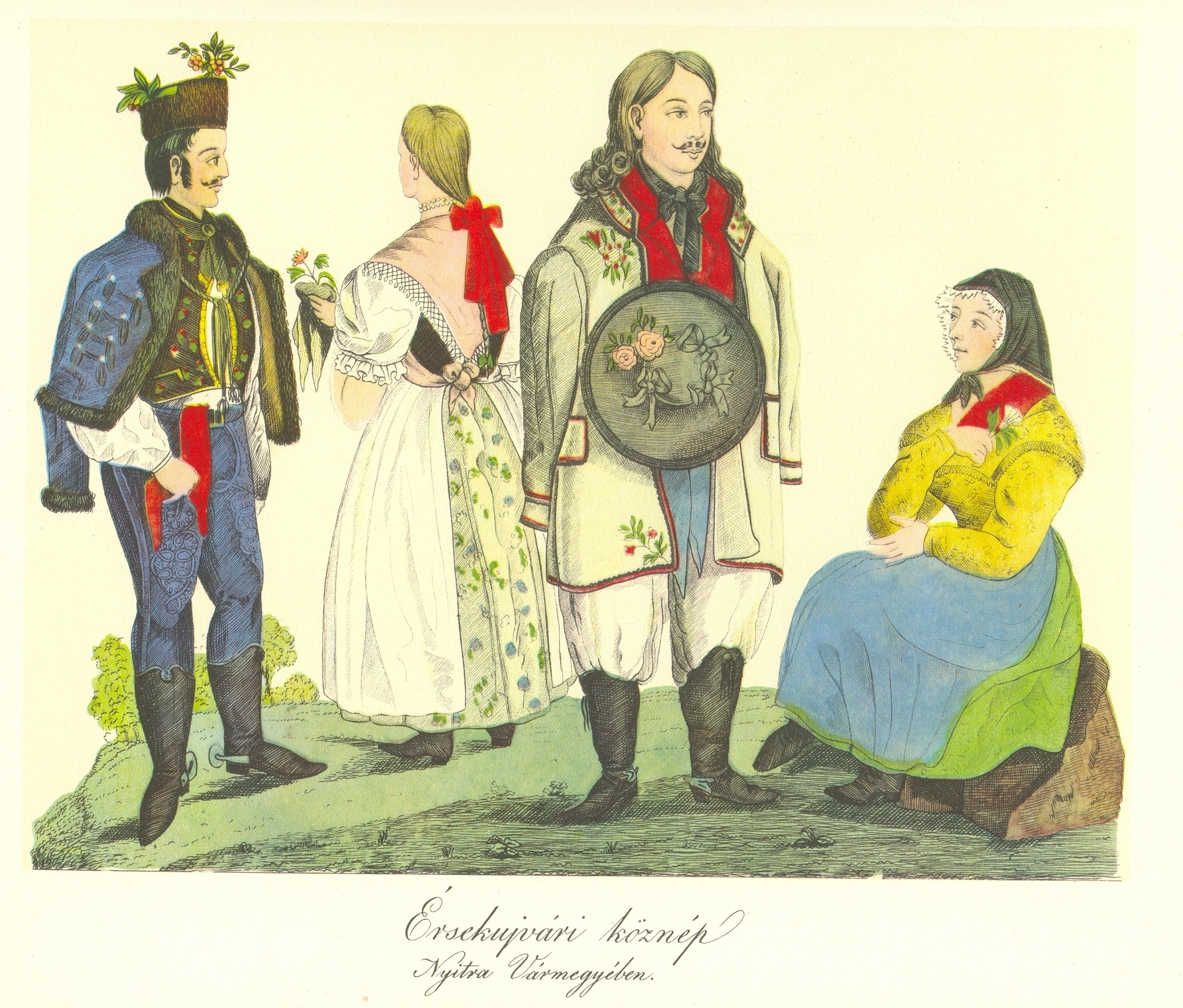

== Embroidery ==
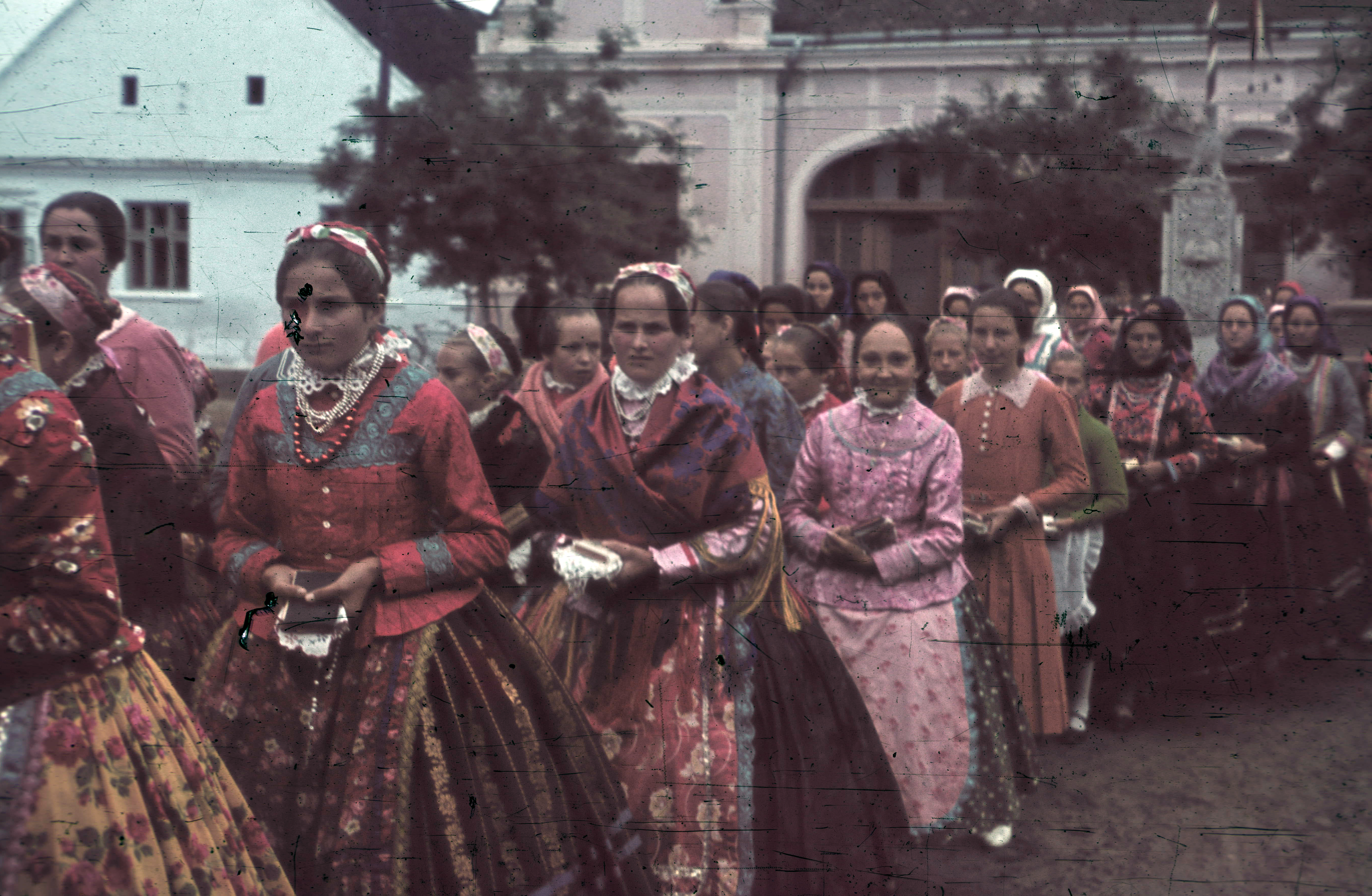
Hungarian women walking whilst holding prayer books (1940)

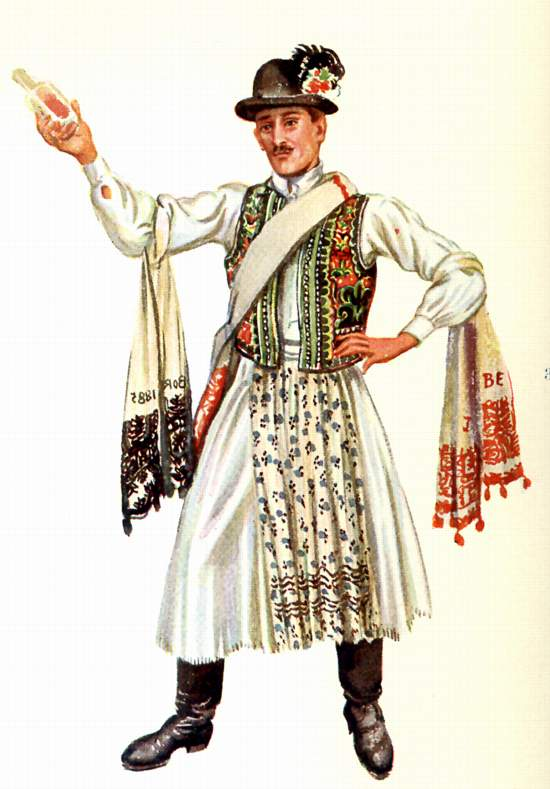
A vőfély in traditional costume, c. 1885

Hungarian folk art is varied and encompasses a variety of influences. It is in the beginning of the 18th century that the current popular style of Hungarian folk art took shape. Flowers and leaves, sometimes a bird or a spiral ornament, are the principal decorative themes of this style. A frequent ornament is a flower with a centerpiece resembling the eye of a peacock's feather.

The finest achievements in their textile arts are the embroideries which vary from region to region. Those of Kalotaszeg in Transylvania are charming products of Oriental design, sewn chiefly in a single color - red, blue, or black. Soft in line, the embroideries are applied on altar cloths, pillow cases and sheets. The embroidery patterns for the Kalotaszeg region were preserved and popularised by several women in the early twentieth century including Gyarmathy Zsigáné Hory Etelka and Kónya Gyuláné Schéfer Teréz.

In Hungary proper, Sárköz (a historical area in Tolna) in Transdanubia and the Matyóföld in the Great Hungarian Plain produce the finest embroideries. In the Sárköz region, the women's caps show black and white designs as delicate as lace and give evidence of the people's subtle artistic feeling. The embroidery motifs applied to women's wear have also been transposed to tablecloths and runners suitable for modern use as wall decorations.

== Kilims ==
Hungarian kilims are traditionally made from wool, or with a combination of hemp or linen and wool. They are pileless and knotless, and generally reversible. They feature predominantly geometric patterns and motifs, formed by colour wefts. The earliest attested record of the term kilim in written Hungarian is from 1604, as kilym.

Székely kilims are associated with the Székely Hungarians of Transylvania, with records of their production from the early 17th century. They were traditionally woven with a hemp warp and wool weft.

Commercialised workshop kilim-production flourished in the Torontál county of the historical Kingdom of Hungary during the late 19th century. Alongside ethnic Hungarians, it involved ethnic Serbs, Romanians and Bulgarians in the county. Torontáli kilims were widely popular in the Kingdom of Hungary during the late 19th century into the early 20th century.

== Ceramics ==
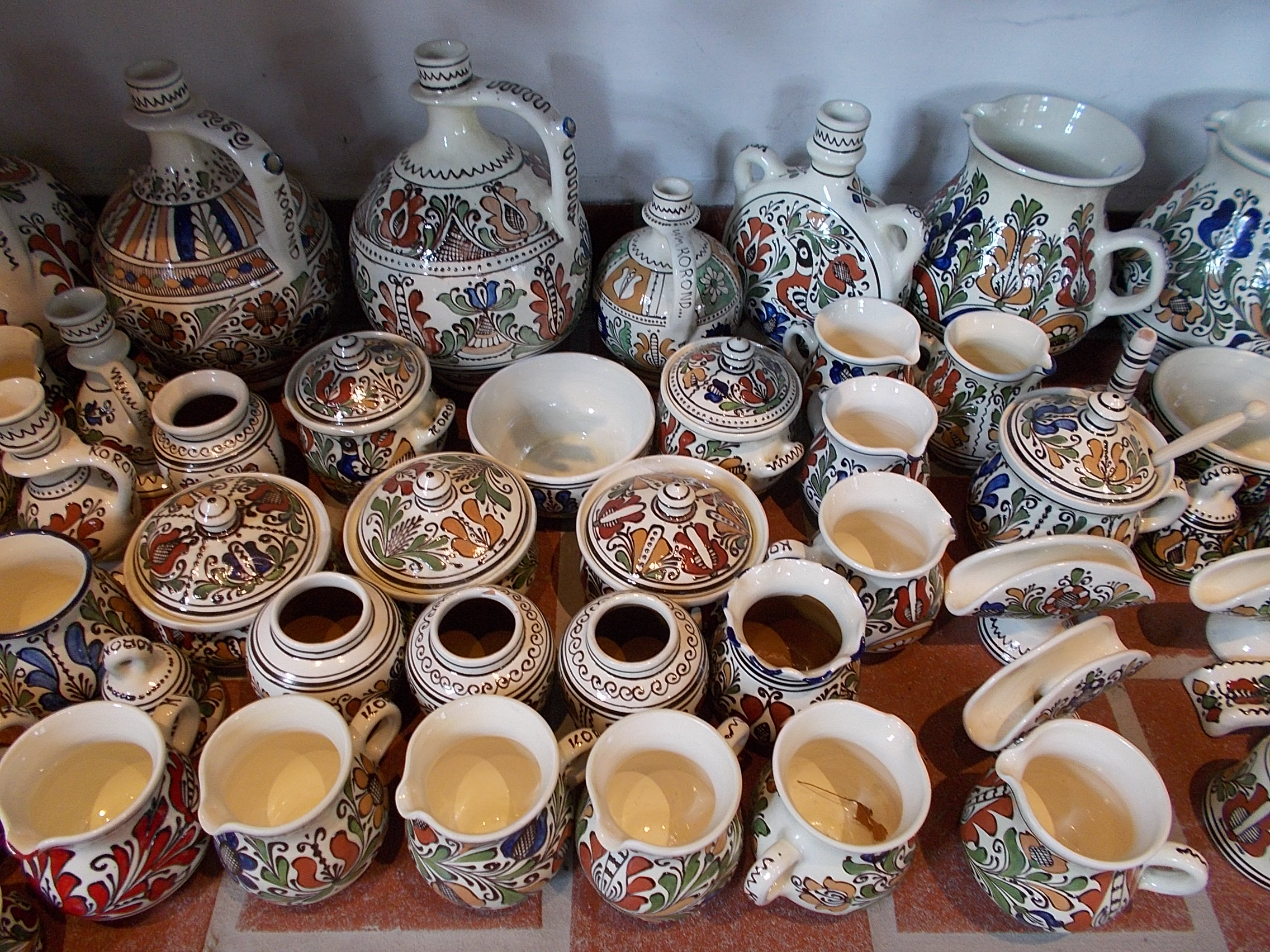
A selection of traditional handpainted ceramics in J&A Kerámia shop, Gyenesdiás

A display of traditional handpainted plates

=== Black pottery ===
These vessels, made of black clay, reflect more than three hundred years of traditional Transdanubian folk patterns and shapes. No two are precisely alike, since all work is done by hand, including both the shaping and the decorating. The imprints are made by the thumb or a finger of the ceramist who makes the piece.

=== Herend Porcelain ===
Founded in 1826, Herend Porcelain is one of the world's largest ceramic factories, specializing in luxury hand painted and gilded porcelain. In the mid-19th century, it was purveyor to the Habsburg Dynasty and aristocratic customers throughout Europe. Many of its classic patterns are still in production. After the fall of communism in Hungary, the factory was privatized and is now 75% owned by its management and workers, exporting to over 60 countries of the world.

== Hungarian domestic animals ==
There are specifically Hungarian breeds of domestic animals which are seen as national symbols in Hungary:

- Long-horn Hungarian Grey Cattle - Hungarian breed, traditionally kept in the open full year. Nowadays, they are raised for infant food due to natural, healthy meat.
- Dogs
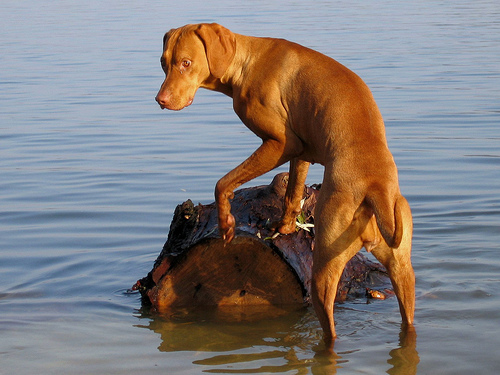
  A female Vizsla
  - Hungarian Vizsla - one of the oldest hunting dogs in the world. The ancestors of this dog came into the Carpathian Basin with the nomadic Hungarian tribes.
  - Puli - small shepherd dog
  - Komondor - large shepherd dog, was brought to Hungary a thousand years ago by nomadic Magyars.
  - Kuvasz - large shepherd dog
  - Pumi - small shepherd dog
  - Magyar Agár (Hungarian Greyhound) was already known in the 8th century. It is as old as the Vizsla.
  - Transylvanian Bloodhound - Hungarian hound
  - Mudi - shepherd dog
- Hungarian thoroughbred horses - a mid-19th century mixture of the best Arab and English racehorse characteristics.
- Mangalica, a breed of pig, with long curly hair and relatively fatty meat, which makes them ideal for making sausages and salami.

== Sport ==
Only seven countries (USA, USSR, UK, France, Italy, China, and Germany) have won more Summer Olympic gold medals than Hungary. Hungary has the second most Olympic gold medals per capita in the Summer Olympics. Hungary has the ninth highest, out of 211 participating nations, all-time total medal count for the Olympic Games, with a total of 465 medals. This despite the fact that Hungary was punished and barred from participation in the 1920 and 1984 Olympics. In the Summer Olympics, Hungary was always been among the top 10 best nations (in gold medal count) between 1928 and 1996, when they were allowed to compete. Hungary had the third most gold medals in 1936, 1952, 1956, and 1960. See: All-time Olympic Games medal table (2008 data)

Among the most famous Hungarians is footballer Ferenc Puskás (1927–2006). He scored 84 goals in 85 internationals for Hungary, and 511 goals in 533 matches in the Hungarian and Spanish leagues. Puskás played in the 1954 FIFA World Cup Final against West Germany. In 1958, after the Hungarian Revolution, he emigrated to Spain, where he played on the legendary Real Madrid team that also included Alfredo Di Stéfano and Francisco Gento.

Hungarians are also known for their prowess at water sports, mainly swimming, water polo (See: Water polo at the Summer Olympics) (in which they defeated the Soviet team in 1956), and canoeing (they have won multiple medals). Krisztina Egerszegi is one of the greatest Hungarian Olympic champions of the modern era. She is a three-time Olympian (1988, 1992 and 1996) and five time Olympic champion in swimming; and one of three individuals to have ever won the same swimming event at three consecutive Summer Olympics. She is currently also the only female swimmer who won five individual Olympic gold medals. As a player, till date Dezső Gyarmati (1927–2013) is the first and only athlete (man or woman) to win five Olympic medals in water polo: three gold, one silver and one bronze. As a head coach, he guided the Hungary men's national water polo team to three Olympic medals: one gold, one silver and one bronze, making him one of the most successful water polo coaches in Olympic history, and the only man to win Olympic gold in water polo as player and head coach in the last 100 years. In 2013, FINA described him as a "legendary water polo player and coach", and "one of the best players the game ever seen and in fact the most decorated in history".

Despite being landlocked, the presence of two major rivers (the Duna and the Tisza) and a major lake (Balaton), provide excellent opportunities to practice water sports. In recent years there has also been a steady rise in the number of golfers in the country; the sport has developed much over the past 20 years (after the fall of Socialism), but the economic situation hinders further development of golf courses.

Some of the world's best sabre fencing athletes have historically hailed from Hungary.

Hungary's national basketball team was one of Europe's major basketball forces from the mid-1940s until the mid-1960s when it won several medals at the European Basketball Championship and often qualified for the Summer Olympics. In the past decades, the team showed its potential less frequently. Its most famous player in recent decades has been Kornél Dávid.

The Hungarian national ice hockey team also qualified for their first IIHF World Championship in more than 70 years.

== Games ==
Traditional toys are made from various plants, for example juglans (dió), nuts (mogyoró) or maize. "Erre csörög a dió, arra meg a mogyoró" is one of the most famous Magyar children's games.

Ulti is one of the most famous card games played by a 32-card set so-called: "Magyar kártya", exactly: "Tell-Karte" with German decks.

Button football is a tabletop game which is known in Europe, typically in Hungary.

The Rubik's Cube was invented in Hungary in 1977 and gained international fame.

Hungary has produced many top-level chess players, notably Judith Polgar and Peter Leko. The 45th Chess Olympiad was hosted in Budapest in 2024.

== Flag ==
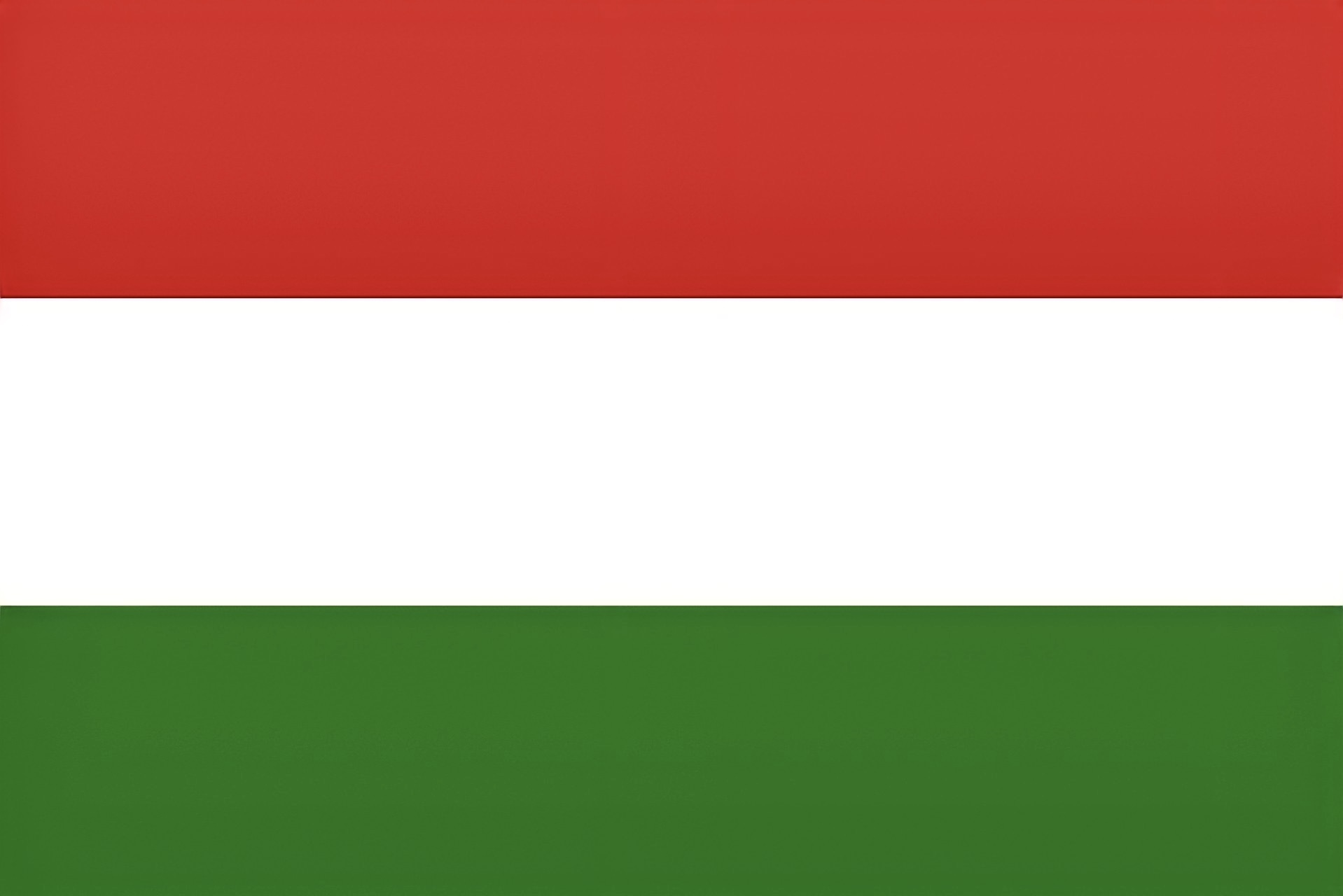
An image portraying the Flag of Hungary

The flag of Hungary is a horizontal tricolour of red, white and green (red-white-green). This revised style was adopted on the 12th of October 1957 following the Hungarian Revolution of 1956.

The colours were used during the coronation of Matthias II in 1608. It is speculated that the colours and their relationship with the Hungarian monarchy date back to the 13th century.

The colours of the flag are also present in the traditional Hungarian Coat of Arms. The red is thought to signify the various battles which Hungary has fought in, whilst the white and green denote Hungary's rivers and mountains respectively.

== See also ==
- List of Hungarians
- List of libraries in Hungary
- List of museums in Hungary
- Renaissance architecture in Central Europe
- National symbols of Hungary
