= Csigatészta =

The csigatészta or lúdgége is a Hungarian pasta type, specifically made for soups. It is an essential part of Hungarian chicken soups (tyúkhús leves). It is made by mainland Hungarians and later the Hungarians of Vojvodina.

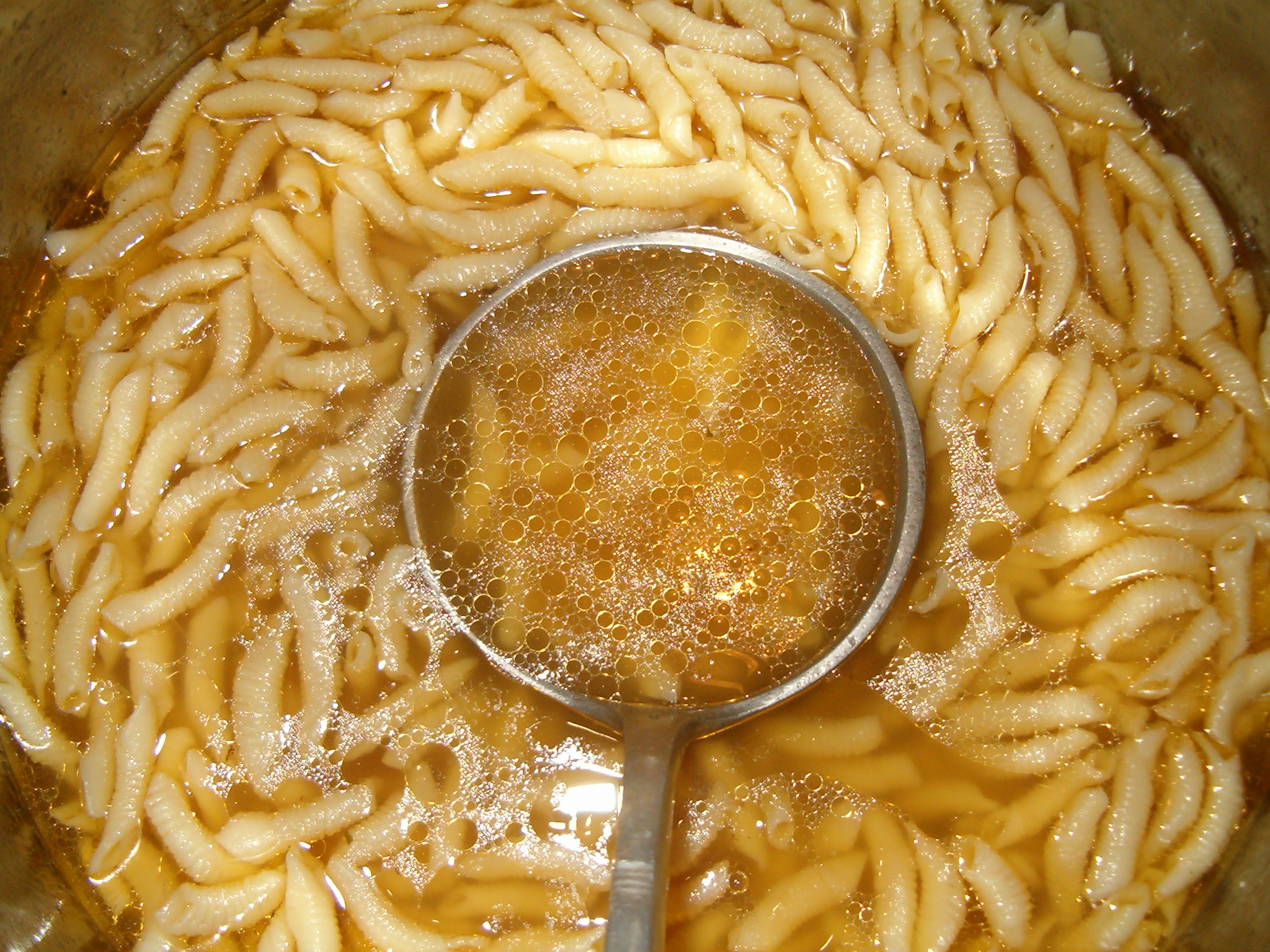
Csigatészta in soup

== Traditions ==
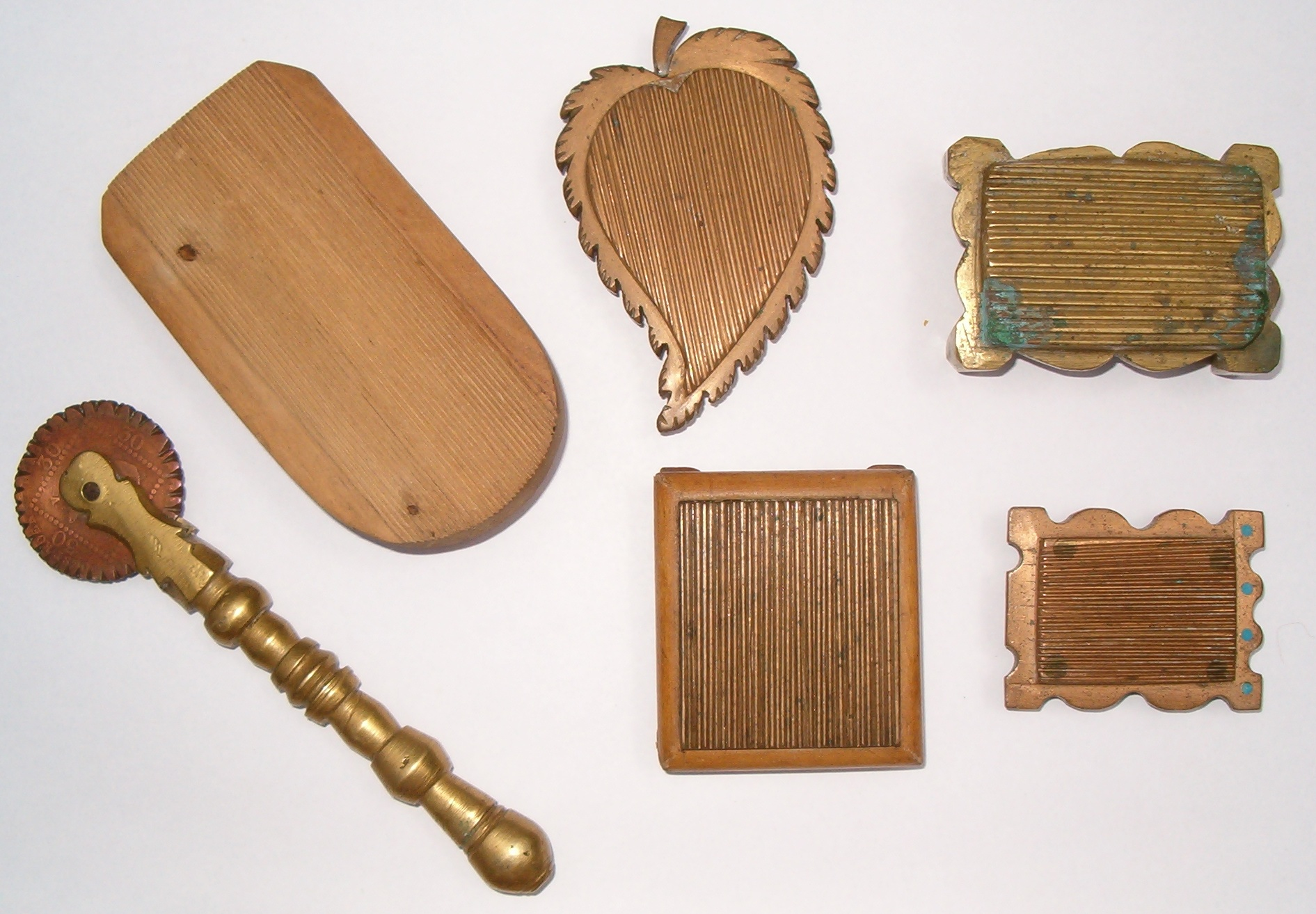
Tools for making the csigatészta. The flat tools on the right side are called csigacsináló borda, while the rod in the left is an orsó (Hungarian for spindle)

The pasta is often added to chicken soups, mushroom soups or vegetable soups. The making of csiga pasta is typically made in communities, where they can make up to 100-150 of them, which will end up on the festivity table. The csiga pasta can not be missing from the wedding tables of Alföld. At weddings, it is traditionally prepared by the wedding party in large quantities (from 40 to 50 eggs)

The preparation of the pasta was an important part of the preparations for the wedding. The "csigacsináló" (csiga making) was usually held before the wedding. All the relatives and neighbours' wives were invited to help. The work was often done by as many as 40 woman. Some of the women kneaded the dough, some stretched and cut it, the most time-consuming work was the shaping of the snail itself. The dough was cut into small cubes, and then the ribbing was engraved into them. The Csiga making tools were really popular hand-made wedding gifts and were elaborately hand-painted instruments.

To make it nice and golden-colored, many eggs were mixed into the dough. The housewife led the csigázós During the csiga making, the hosts offered the "csigázós" (people making the csiga, led by the housewife) cakes and wine, and in many places they also served them dinner. The pastry-making was filled with singing, talking, gossip, stories and horror stories. This was an important time for young girls to grow up and learn a lot from their elders, including how to prepare food. At the end of the work, the men, the lads, sometimes they would bring musicians, and at the end of the work they would have fun and dance. Professional csigamakers also existed.

== See also ==
- Hungarian cuisine
- List of pasta
- Hungarian culture
