= Budapest Noir =

2012 novel by Vilmos Kondor

- Budapest Noir first-edition cover
- Author: Vilmos Kondor
- Original title: Budapest Noir
- Translator: Paul Olchvary
- Language: English
- Series: Budapest Noir
- Subject: Hungary in the 1930s
- Genre: Mystery fiction, noir
- Publisher: HarperCollins
- Publication date: February 2012
- Publication place: United States
- Media type: Print paperback
- Pages: 304 (first edition)
- ISBN: 0-061-85939-7
- Dewey Decimal: 813/.5/4
- LC Class: PH3382.21.O555B8313 2012

Budapest Noir is the first Hungarian noir written by Vilmos Kondor and published by HarperCollins in Hungary in February 2012. The novel is about a crime journalist Zsigmond Gordon, who wants to find the killer of a Jewish girl found dead in Budapest in 1936, and besides the criminal element offers social commentary, political and historical background of Hungary flirting with fascism.

== Plot introduction ==
Budapest, October 1936. Prime Minister Gyula Gömbös is dead. The body of a young Jewish girl is found in a Terézváros doorway. Zsigmond Gordon, a criminal journalist for The Est newspaper, arrives on the scene soon afterwards and starts asking questions, but everywhere seems to run into a brick wall. The clues lead him upwards to the highest echelons of society and downwards to the lowest depths of misery and poverty. Gordon refuses to give up, keeps asking his questions, and the more they want to frighten him off, the more determined he becomes. He does not know whom to trust, and does not know and does not care how many people's interests he is harming. He just wants to find the girl's killer, because, by the look of things, he is the only one who cares.

== Critical reception ==
Several reviewers hailed Budapest Noir as the first noir novel written in Hungarian.

"The search [for a Hungarian crime thriller] is at an end: Vilmos Kondor’s novel is a Hungarian crime thriller and then some, one of the harder variety, in the spirit of Raymond Chandler and Dashiell Hammett, but with Hungarian characters and set in the Hungarian capital in the period before World War II." Péter I. Rácz in

Steven Saylor writes that the novel fulfills its promise:

"Budapest Noir more than fulfills the expectations piqued by its title. With intrepid news reporter Zsigmond Gordon as our guide, the novel takes us down the mean streets of one of Europe's most fascinating cities during one of its darkest chapters."

== Sequels ==
Budapest Noir is the first novel in the series of five. It was followed by Bűnös Budapest (Budapest Sin), A budapesti kém (The Budapest Spy), Budapest romokban (Budapest in Ruins) and in 2012 the final installment titled Budapest novemberben (Budapest in November').

== Publication history ==
- 2008, Hungary, Agave Könyvek ISBN 978-963-7118-96-8, Pub date February 2008, Paperback.
- 2012, HarperCollins ISBN 0-061-85939-7, Pub date January 2012, Paperback.

== Film adaptation ==
The rights for the movie were sold before the book was published, and the film was released in 2017

== Foreign editions ==
As of August 1, 2012, 'Budapest Noir' has been published by

- Edizioni e/o in Italy
- Payot et Rivages in France
- Proszynski i S-ka in Poland
- Mynx in Netherlands
- Droemer Knaur in Germany

== Other similar stories ==
- The 1993 Berlin Noir trilogy by Philip Kerr
- The 2000 novel Kingdom of Shadows by Alan Furst
- The 2009 novel Shadows and Light by Jonathan Rabb
