= Vilmos Kondor =

Hungarian writer (born 1954)

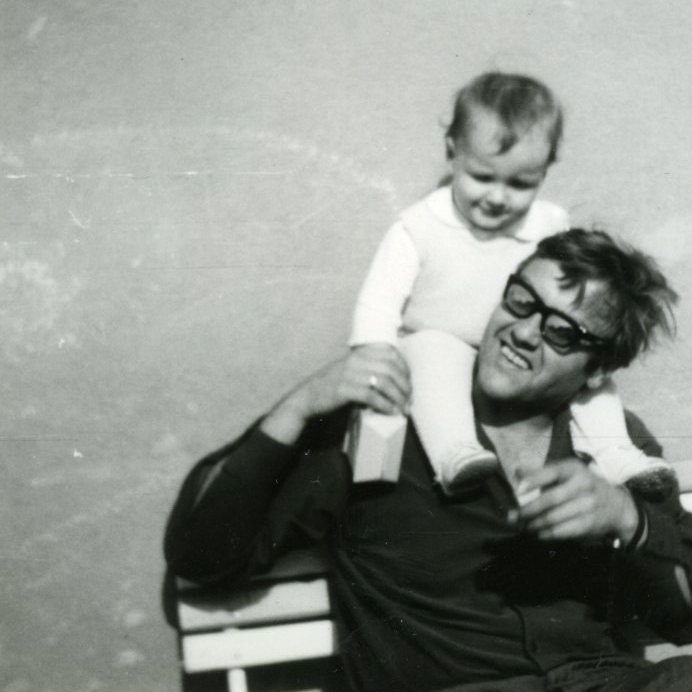
Young Kondor Vilmos

Vilmos Kondor (born 1954) is the name (possibly pseudonym) of a successful Hungarian author. He's been dubbed as "the creator of Hungarian crime fiction".

His seven crime novels, known as the "Sinful Budapest" or "Budapest Noir" Cycle, depict the adventures of a journalist, Zsigmond Gordon, and are set in Budapest from the 1930s to the 1950s. They have become very popular in Hungary. The first novel in the cycle, Budapest Noir, was adapted as a film directed by Éva Gárdos which premiered on 2 November 2017.

Kondor has written a trilogy of historical thrillers about the fictional Wertheimer family's almost century-long affiliation with the Holy Crown of Hungary; a trilogy of contemporary police procedurals with political overtones featuring Detective Tibor Ferenczy; and a short novel, Az otthontalanság otthona (The home of homelessness), the income from which he donated to a charity that supported the migrants who arrived in Hungary during the crisis in 2015.

In 2022 he published the first of a series of mystery novels set in an alternate reality version of 20th century history, in which following the end of World War II Hungary does not become a communist Eastern Bloc nation, but rather develops into an independent and successful Switzerland-like capitalist country. Some of the same characters who appear in his "Sinful Budapest" cycle also appear or are referenced in the new counterfactual/speculative fiction series.

In April of 2023, the first novel in this series, Második magyar köztársaság (The Second Hungarian Republic) won the Péter Zsoldos Audience Choice Prize, an annual Hungarian literary award given to works in the imaginative fiction genre (science fiction, fantasy, supernatural horror, etc.) genre.

His novels and short stories have been turned into audiobooks, radio plays, a graphic novel, photo exhibitions, and an interactive smartphone app, Budapest walking tour and interactive mystery game.

== Biography ==
=== Personal life ===
Kondor attended university in Szeged, then continued his studies in Paris. He graduated in chemical engineering from the Sorbonne, then returned to Hungary. Currently he teaches mathematics and physics at a high school. He lives with his wife, daughters and dog in a small village near Sopron.

=== Professional life ===
Kondor worked for three years on his first published novel, Budapest Noir. It was his fourth finished manuscript. Kondor finished the Budapest Noir series with the fifth novel, Budapest novemberben (Budapest in November), published in June 2012.

== Works ==
=== Budapest Noir Cycle ===
The core five novels of the Budapest Noir cycle are set in Budapest during the years 1936-1956 and all feature Zsigmond Gordon, a determined crime reporter. As prequels to the series two additional novels have been published, plus a collection of short stories. These prequels chronicle Gordon's history in both Philadelphia and Budapest prior to 1936.

The novels have proven to be very successful in Hungary.

To date, only Budapest Noir, the first novel in the series, has been published in an English printed edition (Perennial, 2012), but new English translations of the five core novels were scheduled to be released as Amazon Kindle editions in 2025/26, starting with a new translation of Budapest Noir (Kondor Publishing, 2025) prepared by Tamas Istvan Kiss and John Michel under the author's supervision. Budapest Noir has also been published in German, Italian, French, Polish, Dutch, Russian, Estonian, Bulgarian, Greek, Czech, and Slovenian translations, and all five core novels of the Budapest Noir cycle were translated into Finnish and published by Tammi.

Budapest Noir

The first novel in the series was published in February 2008 by Agave Könyvek.

A Jewish girl is found dead in Budapest in 1936, and Zsigmond Gordon sets out to solve a murder that everyone else in his soon-to-be Fascist country wants to leave buried.

Budapest Noir received a warm reception in Hungary, and many reviewers hailed it as the first true hardboiled crime story written in Hungarian. One critic, Péter I. Rácz, welcomed Kondor as the author of the first Hungarian crime thriller.

"The search [for a Hungarian crime thriller] is at an end: Vilmos Kondor’s novel is a Hungarian crime thriller and then some, one of the harder variety, in the spirit of Chandler and Hammett, but with Hungarian characters and set in the Hungarian capital in the period before World War II. ... Kondor’s literary experiment has been a great success: the Hungarian hard-boiled crime thriller has been born, and, far predating its own period, it leads its readers – with an effect that 'carries into the present' – to the literary realm of the 1930s." –ÉS

Bűnös Budapest (Budapest Vice)

The sequel to Budapest Noir was published in June 2009 by Agave Könyvek.

The story is set in the fall of 1939, a couple of weeks after the outbreak of World War II, and features Zsigmond Gordon and Sándor Nemes, a retired detective. They start investigating two different cases: Gordon wants to find out why a former colleague and friend has died, while Nemes is hired to find out what happened to a huge quantity of cocaine and morphine that has gone missing.

One reviewer, Péter Urfi, wrote about the "Kondor phenomenon":

“In the Hungarian book market, developments as joyful as the Kondor phenomenon are rare. Kondor is a professional genre author: he knows exactly what a hard-boiled crime novel should be like, and how to write one. His protagonist, the resigned crime reporter Zsigmond Gordon, and his chosen time and place, Budapest in the 1930s, are both complex and mysterious enough for a series to be built around them, with the same characters and the same readers, for whom the slightly more lengthy Budapest Sin will not be a disappointment." –Magyar Narancs

A budapesti kém (Budapest Spy)

The third novel in the series was published in 2010 by Agave Könyvek.

Hungary is about to get drawn into World War II when Zsigmond Gordon is asked to do something important for his country, and sets out to catch a deadly spy in war-torn Europe, only to find the traitor in Budapest in 1943.

A critic called the novel a "time machine".

"All those who have never daydreamed about travelling back in time with a time machine to change the course of certain events, raise your hand. If any of you wish to relive Hungary as it was in the 1940s, then by all means pick up Vilmos Kondor’s latest novel, which not only reveals practical espionage facts, but also depicts the operation and circumstances reigning within the secret services of a country being driven into war."

Budapest romokban (Budapest in Ruins)

The fourth novel in the series was published in 2011 by Agave Könyvek.

After the horrors of World War II, Hungary is about to become a democracy, but in the summer of 1946 an assassin strikes in the middle of Budapest, and the consequences are more dire than anyone would dare to think.

A reviewer emphasized that Kondor writes about a kind of freedom that has not been common in Hungary:

“Without Vilmos Kondor’s work the acts of the man socialized for freedom (with all it consequences) couldn’t be studied in Hungarian texts.”

Budapest novemberben (Budapest in Revolt)

The fifth novel in the series was published in 2012 by Agave Könyvek.

October 1956 finds Gordon in exile in Vienna, where he is asked to identify a dead body as his adopted daughter. Even though the girl turns out to be someone else, Gordon – along with Krisztina – hops on the last train to Budapest, where a revolution has just started, tanks are rolling onto the streets, and people are dying by the hundreds.

A reviewer welcomed the way Kondor handles history in this final novel in the Budapest Noir series:

"Kondor doesn't only paint a picture and doesn't only repeat what is in the history books: he tries to interpret it, make sense of it, and help us understand the relations and dynamics of this hectic era."

Szélhámos Budapest (Budapest Con)

Published in 2016 by Libri Könyvkiadó.

This novel is the prequel to Budapest Noir, which sheds light on Gordon Zsigmond's youth, the years following the stock market crash, and the journalist's first case in Pest.

A haldokló részvényes (The Dying Shareholder)

Published in 2018 by Libri Könyvkiadó.

A collection of new and previously published short stories featuring Budapest and Zsigmond Gordon. As a correspondent for Az Est, Gordon follows up on mysterious and complicated cases, as well as not so mysterious ones, involving murderous servants, swindlers, safe-drillers, and femme fatales.

A budapesti gengszter (Budapest Gangster)

Published in 2019 by Libri Könyvkiadó.

In the spring of 1929 Zsigmond Gordon is in the United States, working as journalist for the Philadelphia Inquirer. He receives an unexpected assignment: to write an article about the liquor smuggling that has engulfed the city and the corruption that feeds on it.

=== The Holy Crown Trilogy ===
A másik szárnysegéd (The Other Aide-de-Camp)

Published in 2013 Agave Könyvek

In the life of Lieutenant Miklós Wertheimer, who serves as aide-de-camp to Admiral Horthy, the Regent of Hungary, three things are important: his uniform, his honor, and his car. But in October 1944 all three are in danger at the same time.

A koronaőr második tévedése (The Crown Guard’s Second Mistake)

Published in 2014 by Agave Könyvek

At the end of April 1919 the demobilized First Lieutenant Miklós Wertheimer, who, recovering from the Spanish flu, hears worrying news about the protecting the Holy Crown of Hungary, the traditional role of the generation the Wertheimer family.

A korona ügynöke (Agent of the Crown)

Published in 2018 by Libri Könyvkiadó

In 1876, Miklós Gyra is a not very successful lawyer living in Pest, has his calm bourgeois life unexpectedly disrupted by a diary that arrives in the mail that reveals a complicated story revolving around the mysterious disappearance of the ancient Holy Crown of Saint Stephen.

=== Detective Tibor Ferenczy Series ===
A bűntől keletre (East of Sin)

Published in 2017 by Libri Könyvkiadó

Budapest, 2015. The Prime Minister's birthday party ends with a death in a bowl of minestrone soup. National panic breaks out, the press speculates, and the police are helpless. Detective Ferenczy is drafted for the team created to investigate the death and catch the perpetrator.

Értetek teszem (I do it for you)

Co-written by Zsófi Kemény and Vilmos Kondor Published in 2018 by Libri Könyvkiadó

Budapest is plunged into chaos. The air is dominated by drones, the streets by armed men and a handful of police trying to stop them. In this confusion, Capt. Tibor Ferenczy tracks down the killer, who at first he thinks is a simple madman, but it soon becomes clear that he is taking his victims based on a precise and conscious plan.

Örvényben (In a Vortex)

Published in 2021 by Libri Könyvkiadó

1989 was memorable for the newly-graduated detective Tibor Ferenczy: not only did the Kádár system collapse, but he found himself in the middle of a love triangle.

=== Paternoster Noir Mysteries (Alternate Hungarian Reality Series) ===
This new series of speculative fiction mystery novels is set in an alternate reality version of 20th century history in which Hungary negotiates a separate peace at the end of World War II and does not fall under Soviet control. Some actual historical figures appear in these novels, but often play far different roles in Kondor's post-1945 version of reality than they did in actuality. In both novels, a Paternoster lift (aka the "elevator of death") plays a role.

Második magyar köztársaság (The Second Hungarian Republic)

Published in 2022 by Open Books

The first of a series of contrafactual or “alternate reality mysteries” opens on June 26, 1966, when the Beatles are preparing for their first concert in Hungary at the National Stadium and one of their sound technicians is found stabbed behind the soundstage.

An English-language version of this novel is being prepared for possible Amazon Kindle release with the working title Pater Noster Noir, or, A Hard Day's Night in Budapest.

Az első budapesti olimpia (The First Budapest Olympics)

Published in 2023 by Open Books

After Mexico City withdraws from hosting the 1968 Olympics, the games are staged in Budapest. The American-born Gold medal contender of the Hungarian swimming team, Ike "Johnny" Wilkerson, dives into the Olympic pool only to sink dead to its bottom a few seconds later.

== Style and method ==
Kondor always uses a third-person narrative that is arguably a masked first-person narrative, since the reader always sees what the protagonist(s) see. The narrator is also an historical figure who knows only the time frame of the novel and never steps out of it. Kondor thus views events through the eyes of his protagonists, and rarely comments on the political situation. He follows in the steps of Charles Willeford in the sense that his characters never "think", they only "act": there are no inner monologues.

Kondor often mixes his fictional characters with persons from real life, including Leó Vécsey (journalist), Kornél Tábori (journalist), Tibor Ferenczy (police commissioner), Péter Hain (detective), Tibor Wayand (detective), István Bárczy (chief of staff), and Vilmos Tarján (journalist). He thoroughly researches both the actual figures and historical events that appear in his novels in order to invoke the atmosphere of Hungary, and especially Budapest, in the past.
