= Ugrós =

The Ugrós is an athletic Hungarian couples' jumping dance in 2/4 meter with an off-beat accent similar to polkas or hasaposerviko. Its origins lay in weapon dances from the Middle Ages.

== Dunántúli Ugros ==
Dunántúli Ugros is a couples' folk dance from Transdanubia (Dunántúl in Hungarian), the western part of Hungary.

== See also ==
- Hopak
- Hasapiko
