= Kaddish =

Jewish prayer recited communally, often by mourners

The Kaddish (Hebrew: קַדִּישׁ, 'holy' or 'sanctification'), also transliterated as Qaddish, is a hymn praising God that is recited during Jewish prayer services. The central theme of the Kaddish is the magnification and sanctification of God's name. In the liturgy, different versions of the Kaddish are functionally chanted or sung to separate the sections of the service.

The term Kaddish is often used to refer specifically to the Mourner's Kaddish, which is chanted as part of the mourning rituals in Judaism in all prayer services, as well as at funerals (other than at the gravesite) and memorials; for 11 Hebrew months after the death of a parent; and in some communities for 30 days after the death of a spouse, sibling, or child. A person is described as "saying Kaddish" if they are carrying out these rituals of mourning. Mourners recite Kaddish to show that, despite the loss, they still praise God.

Along with the Shema Yisrael and the Amidah, the Kaddish is one of the central elements of Jewish liturgy. Kaddish is traditionally recited only with a minyan—a quorum of ten adult Jews.

== Variant forms ==
The various versions of the Kaddish are as follows. Each one generally has a descriptive name and an alternative name that points to a word appearing in that version of the Kaddish:

- The Half Kaddish (Jewish Babylonian Aramaic: חֲצִי קַדִּישׁ, pronounced [ħaˈsˤiː qadˈdiːʃ]), or Reader's Kaddish (קַדִּישׁ לְעֵלָּא, pronounced [qadˈdiːʃ ləʕeːˈlaː]), is used as a divider to punctuate between different sections of prayer, such as between Pesukei Dezimra and the Barekhu in Shacharit, and before the Amidah in Mincha and Maariv.
- The Mourner's Kaddish (קַדִּישׁ יָתוֹם, 'Orphan's Kaddish', pronounced [qadˈdiːʃ jaːˈθoːm]; also, קַדִּישׁ יְהֵא שְׁלָמָא רַבָּא, '[Kaddish of] may there be great peace', pronounced [qadˈdiːʃ jəˈheːʔ ʃəlaːˈmaː rabˈbaː]) is recited by a mourner at the end of a prayer service and after a memorial prayer (e.g., on a yahrzeit)
- Kaddish Shalem (קַדִּישׁ שָׁלֵם, 'Complete Kaddish', pronounced [qadˈdiːʃ ʃaːˈleːm]) or Kaddish Titkabbel (קַדִּישׁ תִּתְקַבֵּל, '[Kaddish of] may it be accepted', pronounced [qadˈdiːʃ tiθqabˈbeːl]). Originally used to mark the end of a service, although in later times extra passages and hymns were added to follow it.
- Rabbis' Kaddish (קַדִּישׁ דְּרַבָּנַן, pronounced [qadˈdiːʃ dərabˈbaːnan]; also, קַדִּישׁ עַל יִשְׂרָאֵל, 'Kaddish for Yisrael', pronounced [qadˈdiːʃ ʕal jisraːˈʔeːl]). The Rabbis' Kaddish is used after any part of the service that includes extracts from the Mishnah or the Talmud, as its original purpose was to close a study session.
- Kaddish Aḥar Hakevura (קַדִּישׁ אַחַר הַקְּבוּרָה, 'Kaddish after the burial', pronounced [/qadˈdiːʃ ʔaħar haqqəvuːˈraː/]), also called Kaddish De'iṭḥad'ata (קַדִּישׁ דְּאִתְחַדְתָּא, 'Kaddish of Renewal', pronounced [qadˈdiːʃ dəʔiθħaðitːtaː]), is recited during a funeral service. It is also said at a siyyum following the completion of a tractate of the Talmud, in which case it is referred to as the "Kaddish Aḥar Hashlamat Masekhet" (קַדִּישׁ אַחַר הַשְׁלָמַת מַסֶּכֶת, 'Kaddish after the completion of a tractate', pronounced [qadˈdiːʃ ʔaħar haʃlaːmaθ masˈsɜxɜθ]). As this version is the longest form of Kaddish, it is also referred to as the "Great Kaddish" (קַדִּישׁ הַגָּדוֹל, pronounced [qadˈdiːʃ haggaːˈðoːl]).

All versions of the Kaddish begin with the text of the Half Kaddish (in the case of the Great Kaddish, with an extra passage inserted). The other versions contain additional paragraphs and are often named after distinctive words in those paragraphs. Historically there existed another type of Kaddish, called Kaddish Yaḥid (קַדִּישׁ יָחִיד, 'Individual's Kaddish', pronounced [qadˈdiːʃ jaːˈħiːð]). It was included in the siddur of Amram Gaon, it but is a meditation taking the place of a Kaddish rather than a Kaddish in the usual sense. It had not been recited in modern times until the COVID-19 pandemic, which made coming together to form a minyan difficult. Some communities began reciting the Kaddish Yachid, or a portion thereof, in place of the Mourner's Kaddish.

== Text ==
The following includes the Half, Complete, Mourner's and Rabbis' Kaddish. The variant lines of the Great Kaddish are given below, as well as variants used by some Jewish communities.

#	English translation	Transliteration	Aramaic
1	Exalted and sanctified^{b} be His great name^{a}	Yitgaddal veyitqaddash shmeh rabba	יִתְגַּדַּל וְיִתְקַדַּשׁ שְׁמֵהּ רַבָּא
2	In the world which He created according to His will!	Beʻalma di vra khir'uteh	בְּעָלְמָא דִּי בְרָא כִרְעוּתֵהּ
3	May He establish His kingdom	Veyamlikh malkhuteh	וְיַמְלִיךְ מַלְכוּתֵהּ
4	And may His salvation blossom and His anointed be near^{ad}	[Veyatzmaḥ purqaneh viqarev (qetz) meshiḥeh]	וְיַצְמַח פֻּרְקָנֵהּ וִיקָרֵב (קֵץ) מְשִׁיחֵהּ
5	During your lifetime and during your days	Beḥayeikhon uvyomeikhon	בְּחַיֵּיכוֹן וּבְיוֹמֵיכוֹן
6	And during the lifetimes of all the House of Israel,	Uvḥaye dekhol bet yisrael	וּבְחַיֵּי דְכָל בֵּית יִשְׂרָאֵל
7	Speedily and very soon! And say, Amen.^{a}	Baʻagala uvizman qariv veʼimru amen	בַּעֲגָלָא וּבִזְמַן קָרִיב. וְאִמְרוּ אָמֵן
The next two lines are recited by the congregation and then the leader:
8	May His great name be blessed	Yehei shmeih rabba mevorakh	יְהֵא שְׁמֵהּ רַבָּא מְבָרַךְ
9	For ever, and to all eternity!	Leʻalam ulʻalme ʻalmaya	לְעָלַם וּלְעָלְמֵי עָלְמַיָּא
10	Blessed and praised, glorified and exalted,	Yitbarakh veyishtabbaḥ veyitpa'ar veyitromam	יִתְבָּרַךְ וְיִשְׁתַּבַּח וְיִתְפָּאַר וְיִתְרוֹמַם
11	Extolled and honoured, adored and lauded	Veyitnasse veyithaddar veyitʻalleh veyithallal	וְיִתְנַשֵּׂא וְיִתְהַדָּר וְיִתְעַלֶּה וְיִתְהַלָּל
12	Be the name of the Holy One, blessed be He,^{a}	Shmeh dequdsha berikh hu.	שְׁמֵהּ דְקֻדְשָׁא בְּרִיךְ הוּא.
13	Above and beyond all the blessings,	Leʻella (lʻella mikkol) min kol birkhata	לְעֵלָּא (לְעֵלָּא מִכָּל) מִן כָּל בִּרְכָתָא
14	Hymns, praises and consolations	Veshirata tushbeḥata veneḥemata	וְשִׁירָתָא תֻּשְׁבְּחָתָא וְנֶחֱמָתָא
15	That are uttered in the world! And say, Amen.^{a}	Da'amiran beʻalma veʼimru amen	דַּאֲמִירָן בְּעָלְמָא. וְאִמְרוּ אָמֵן
The half kaddish ends here.
Here the "complete kaddish" includes:
16	^{e}May the prayers and supplications	Titqabbal tzelotehon uvaʻutehon	תִּתְקַבַּל צְלוֹתְהוֹן וּבָעוּתְהוֹן
17	Of all Israel	D'khol (bet) yisrael	דְכָל (בֵּית) יִשְׂרָאֵל
18	Be accepted by their Father who is in Heaven; And say, Amen.^{a}	Qodam avuhon di bishmayya, vʼimru amen	קֳדָם אֲבוּהוֹן דִּי בִשְׁמַיָּא וְאִמְרוּ אָמֵן
Here the "kaddish of the rabbis" (including the kaddish after a siyum) includes:
19	To Israel, to the Rabbis and their disciples	ʻal yisrael veʻal rabbanan veʻal talmideihon	עַל יִשְׂרָאֵל וְעַל רַבָּנָן וְעַל תַּלְמִידֵיהוֹן
20	To the disciples of their disciples,	V'ʻal kol talmidei talmideihon	וְעַל כָּל תַּלְמִידֵי תַלְמִידֵיהוֹן.
21	And to all those who engage in the study of the Torah	Veʻal kol man deʻos'qin b'orayta	וְעַל כָּל מָאן דְּעָסְקִין בְּאוֹרַיְתָא.
22	In this [holy]^{z} place or in any other place,	Di b'atra [qadisha] haden vedi bekhol atar v'atar	דִּי בְאַתְרָא [קַדִישָא] הָדֵין וְדִי בְּכָל אֲתַר וַאֲתַר.
23	May there be for them and for you abundant peace,	Y'hei lehon ul'khon sh'lama rabba	יְהֵא לְהוֹן וּלְכוֹן שְׁלָמָא רַבָּא
24	Grace, lovingkindness and compassion, long life	Hinna v'ḥisda v'raḥamei v'ḥayyei arikhei	חִנָּא וְחִסְדָּא וְרַחֲמֵי וְחַיֵּי אֲרִיכֵי
25	Ample sustenance and salvation	Um'zone r'viḥe ufurqana	וּמְזוֹנֵי רְוִיחֵי וּפוְּרְקָנָא
26	From the Father who is in heaven (and on earth);	Min qodam avuhon di vishmayya [v'ʼarʻa]e	מִן קֳדָם אֲבוּהוּן דְבִשְׁמַיָּא [וְאַרְעָא]
27	And say, Amen.^{a}	V'ʼimru amen	וְאִמְרוּ אָמֵן
All variants but the half kaddish conclude:
28	^{f}May there be abundant peace from heaven,	Yehe shelama rabba min shemayya	יְהֵא שְׁלָמָה רַבָּא מִן שְׁמַיָּא,
29	[And] [good] life	[Ve]hayyim [tovim]	[וְ]חַיִּים [טוֹבִים]
30	Satisfaction, help, comfort, refuge,	Vesava vishuʻa veneḥama veshezava	וְשָֹבָע וִישׁוּעָה וְנֶחָמָה וְשֵׁיזָבָה
31	Healing, redemption, forgiveness, atonement,	Urfuʼa ugʼulla usliha v'khappara	וּרְפוּאָה וּגְאֻלָּה וּסְלִיחָה וְכַפָּרָה,
32	Relief and salvation^{d}	Verevaḥ vehatzala	וְרֵוַח וְהַצָּלָה
33	[For us and for all his people] upon us and upon all Israel; and say, Amen.^{a}	[Lanu ulkhol ʻammo] ʻalainu v'al kol yisrael v'ʼimru amen	[לָנוּ וּלְכָל עַמּוֹ] עׇלֵינוּ וְעַל כׇּל יִשְֹרָאֵל וְאִמְרוּ אָמֵן.
34	^{f}May He who makes peace in His high places	ʻoseh shalom bimromav	עוֹשֶֹה שָׁלוֹם בִּמְרוֹמָיו,
35	Grant [in his mercy]^{g} peace upon us	Hu [berakhamav] yaʻase shalom ʻalenu	הוּא [בְּרַחֲמָיו] יַעֲשֶֹה שָׁלוֹם עָלֵינוּ,
36	And upon all [his nation]^{h} Israel; and say, Amen.^{a}	V'ʻal kol [ammo] yisra'el, v'ʼimru amen	וְעַל כָּל [עַמּוֹ] יִשְֹרָאֵל וְאִמְרוּ אָמֵן.

=== Text of the burial Kaddish ===
In the burial Kaddish, and that after a siyyum among Ashkenazi Jews,^{i}, lines 2-3 are replaced by:

#	English translation	Transcription	Aramaic
37	. . . in the world which He will renew	B'ʻal'ma d'hu ʻatid l'ithaddeta	בְּעָלְמָא דְהוּא עָתִיד לְאִתְחַדְּתָא
38	And where He will give life to the dead	Ulʼaḥa'a metaya	וּלְאֲחָאָה מֵּתַיָא
39	And raise them to eternal life	Ulʼassaqa yat'hon l'ḥayye ʻal'ma	וּלְאֲסָקָא יָּתְהוֹן לְחַיֵּי עָלְמָא
40	And rebuild the city of Jerusalem	Ul'mivne qarta dirush'lem	וּלְמִיבְנֵא קַּרְתָּא דִּירוּשְׁלֵם
41	And complete His temple there	Ul'shakhlala hekhlehh b'gavvah	וּלְשַׁכְלָלָא הֵיכְלֵהּ בְּגַוָּהּ
42	And uproot foreign worship from the earth	Ul'meʻeqar pulḥana nukhraʼa me'arʻa	וּלְמֶעֱקַר פּוּלְחָנָא נּוּכְרָאָה מֵּאַרְעָא
43	And restore Heavenly worship to its position	Ul'aʼatava pulḥana dishmayya l'ʼatreh	וּלְאֲתָבָא פּוּלְחָנָא דִי שְׁמַיָּא לְּאַתְרֵהּ
44	And may the Holy One, blessed is He,	V'yamlikh qudsha b'rikh hu	וְיַמְלִיךְ קוּדְשָׁא בְּרִיךְ הוּא
45	Reign in His sovereign splendour . . .	B'malkhuteh viqareh	בְּמַלְכוּתֵהּ וִיקָרֵהּ

=== Recent changes to Oseh Shalom ===
In some recent non-Orthodox prayerbooks (for example, the American Reform Machzor), line 36 is replaced with:

36	All Israel, and all who dwell on earth; and let us say: Amen.	V'al kol Yisra'el, v'al kol yoshvei teiveil; v'imru: Amen.	וְעַל כָּל יִשְֹרָאֵל וְעַל כָּל יוֺשְׁבֵי תֵבֵל וְאִמְרוּ אָמֵן

This effort to extend the reach of Oseh Shalom to non-Jews is said to have been started by the British Liberal Jewish movement in 1967, with the introduction of v'al kol bnei Adam ("and upon all humans"); these words continue to be used by some in the UK.

=== Notes ===
- Bracketed text varies according to personal or communal traditions.
- (A) The congregation responds with "amen" (אָמֵן) after lines 1, 4, 7, 12, 15, 18, 27, 33, 36. In the Ashkenazi tradition, the response to line 12 is "Blessed be he" (בְּרִיךְ הוּא, b'rikh hu). In some communities the congregation says "Blessed be He" before the chazzan says it, rendering the next phrase "brikh hu le'eilah" (Blessed be He above) (see Darke Moshe OC 56:3).
- (B) On line 1, some say Yitgaddeyl veyitqaddeysh rather than Yitgaddal veyitqaddash, because the roots of these two words are Hebrew and not Aramaic (the Aramaic equivalent would be Yitrabay veyitkadash), some authorities (but not others) felt that both words should be rendered in pure Hebrew pronunciation.
- (C) Line 13: in the Ashkenazi tradition, the repeated "le'ela" is used only during the Ten Days of Repentance, or during the High Holy Days themselves in the German tradition. In the Sephardi tradition, it is never used. In the Yemenite and Italian traditions, it is the invariable wording. The phrase "le'ela le'ela" is the Aramaic translation in Targum Onkelos of the Hebrew phrase "ma'la ma'la" (Deuteronomy 28:43).
- (D) Lines 4 and 30–32 are not present in the Ashkenazi or Italian tradition. "Revaḥ vehatzala" is said aloud by the congregation.
- (E) Line 26: some Sephardi Jews say malka [or maram or mareh] di-shmaya ve-ar'a (the King [or Master] of Heaven and Earth) instead of avuhon de-vi-shmaya (their Father in Heaven); De Sola Pool uses mara; the London Spanish and Portuguese Jews use the same text as the Ashkenazim.
- (F) During the "complete Kaddish," some include the following congregational responses, which are not regarded as part of the text:
  - Before line 16, "accept our prayer with mercy and favour"
  - Before line 28, "May the name of God be blessed, from now and forever"
  - Before line 34, "My help is from God, creator of heaven and earth"
- (G) Line 35: "b'rahamav" is used by Sephardim in all versions of Kaddish; by some Ashkenazim only in "Kaddish deRabbanan" and by others never.
- (H) Line 36: "ammo" is used by most Sephardim, but not by some of the Spanish and Portuguese Jews or Ashkenazim.
- (I) Lines 37 to 45: these lines are also recited by Yemenite Jews as part of every Kaddish DeRabbanan.
- (Z) In line 22, the bracketed word is added in many communities in the Land of Israel.
- In line 1, as noted in (a), the congregation responds "Amen", even though this commonly is not printed in most prayerbooks. This longstanding and widespread tradition introduces a break in the verse which leads to varying opinions regarding whether the phrase "according to His will" applies to "which he created" or to "Magnified and sanctified".
- It is common that the entire congregation recites lines 8 and 9 with the leader, and it is also common that the congregation will include in its collective recitation the first word of the next line (line 10), Yitbarakh. This is commonly thought to be done to prevent any interruption before the next line (which begins with Yitbarakh) is recited by the leader. But this inclusion of Yitbarakh is subject to a major dispute among the Rishonim (medieval authorities). Maimonides and the Jacob ben Asher did not include it in the congregation's recitation; Amram Gaon, the Vilna Gaon, and the Shulchan Aruch include it. In some communities, the congregation recites in an undertone through and including the words "da'amiran beʻalma" (middle of line 15).

== Analysis of the text ==
The opening words of the Kaddish are inspired by the vision in Ezekiel 38:23 of God becoming great in the eyes of all the nations.

The central line of the Kaddish is the congregation's response: יְהֵא שְׁמֵהּ רַבָּא מְבָרַךְ לְעָלַם וּלְעָלְמֵי עָלְמַיָּא (Yehei shmei rabba mevorakh lealam ulealemai alemaya, "May His great name be blessed for ever, and to all eternity"), a public declaration of God's greatness and eternality. This response is similar to the wording of Daniel 2:20. It is also parallel to the Hebrew "בָּרוּךְ שֵׁם כְּבוֹד מַלְכוּתוֹ לְעוֹלָם וָעֶד" ('Blessed be the name is His glorious kingdom forever and ever'), which is commonly recited after the first verse of the Shema. Aramaic versions of both wordings appear in the various versions of Targum Pseudo-Jonathan to Genesis 49:2 and Deuteronomy 6:4.

The Mourner's, Rabbis' and Complete Kaddish end with a supplication for peace ("Oseh Shalom..."), which is in Hebrew, and is somewhat similar to the Tanakh Job 25:2.

Kaddish does not contain God's name. It is said that this is because the first section of Kaddish has 26 words, equalling the gematria (numerological value) of the Tetragrammaton, and the Kaddish text proves that from the very beginning with words "May His great name be exalted and sanctified".

== Customs ==
Kaddish may be spoken or chanted. In services on certain special occasions, it may be sung to special melodies. There are different melodies in different Jewish traditions, and within each tradition the melody can change according to the version, the day it is said and even the position in the service. Many mourners recite Kaddish slowly and contemplatively.

In Sephardi synagogues the whole congregation sits for Kaddish, except:

- During the Half Kaddish immediately before the Amidah, where everyone stands;
- During the Mourner's Kaddish, where those reciting it stand and everyone else sits.

In Ashkenazi synagogues, the custom varies. Very commonly, in both Orthodox and Reform congregations, everyone stands for the Mourner's Kaddish; but in some (especially many Conservative and Sephardic) synagogues, most of the congregants sit. Sometimes, a distinction is made between the different forms of Kaddish, or each congregant stands or sits according to his or her own custom. The Mourner's Kaddish is often treated differently from the other variations of Kaddish in the service, as is the Half Kaddish after a morning Torah reading.

Those standing to recite Kaddish bow, by widespread tradition, at various places. This generally includes the first word of the prayer, at each Amen, at Yitbarakh, at Brikh hu, and for the last verse Oseh shalom. For Oseh shalom it is customary to take three steps back then bow to one's left, then to one's right, and finally bow forward, as if taking leave of the presence of a king, in the same way as when the same words are used as the concluding line of the Amidah.

According to the original Ashkenazic custom, as well as the Yemenite custom, one mourner recites each Kaddish, and the Halachic authorities set down extensive rules to determine who has priority for each kaddish. Most (but not all) Ashkenazic communities have adopted the Sephardic custom to allow multiple mourners to recite Kaddish together.

=== Minyan requirement ===
Masekhet Soferim, an eighth-century compilation of Jewish laws regarding the preparation of holy books and public reading, states in 10:7 that Kaddish may be recited only in the presence of a minyan - a quorum of ten. The traditional view is that "If kaddish is said in private, then by definition it is not kaddish". However some alternatives have been suggested, including the Kaddish l'yachid "Kaddish for an individual", attributed to the ninth-century Amram Gaon, and the use of kavanah prayer, asking heavenly beings to join with the individual "to make a minyan of both Earth and heaven". In some Reform congregations, a minyan is not required for recitation of the Kaddish, but other Reform congregations disagree and believe that the Kaddish should be said publicly.

== History and background ==
David de Silva Pool describes the origin of Kaddish as "a closing doxology to an Aggadic discourse." Most of it is written in Aramaic, which, at the time of its original composition, was the lingua franca of the Jewish people. It is not composed in the vernacular Aramaic, however, but rather in a "literary, jargon Aramaic" that was used in the academies, and is identical to the dialect of the Targumim.

Yoel Elitzur, however, argues that the Kaddish was originally written in Hebrew, and later translated to Aramaic to be better understood by the masses. He notes that quotations from the Kaddish in the Talmud and Sifrei are in Hebrew, and that even today some of the words are Hebrew rather than Aramaic.

The oldest version of the Kaddish is found in the Siddur of Rab Amram Gaon, c. 900. "The first mention of mourners reciting Kaddish at the end of the service is in a thirteenth century halakhic writing called the Or Zarua. The Kaddish at the end of the service became designated as Kaddish Yatom or Mourner's Kaddish (literally, "Orphan's Kaddish")."

The Kaddish was not always recited by mourners and instead became a prayer for mourners sometime between the 12th and 13th centuries when it started to be associated with a medieval legend about Rabbi Akiva who meets a dead man seeking redemption in the afterlife.

=== Hebrew reconstruction ===
Elitzur made an attempt at reconstructing the theorized original Hebrew version of Kaddish:

יִתְגַּדֵּל וְיִתְקַדֵּשׁ שְׁמוֹ הַגָּדוֹל
בָּעוֹלָם שֶׁבָּרָא כִּרְצוֹנוֹ
וְתִמלוֹךְ מַלְכוּתוֹ בְּחַיֵּיכֶם וּבִימֵיכֶם וּבְחַיֵּיהֶם שֶׁל כֹּל בֵּית יִשְׂרָאֵל בִּמְהֵרָה וּבִזְמַן קָרוֹב
יְהִי שְׁמוֹ הַגָּדוֹל מְבוֹרָךְ לְעוֹלָם וּלְעוֹלְמֵי עוֹלָמִים

== Mourner's Kaddish ==
Mourner's Kaddish is said in most communities at all prayer services and certain other occasions. It is written in Aramaic. It is traditionally recited several times, most prominently at or towards the end of the service, after the Aleinu, closing Psalms or, on the Sabbath, following the Anim Zemirot hymn. In most communities, Kaddish is recited during the eleven months after the death of a parent, and then at every anniversary of the death (the Yahrzeit). Technically, there is no obligation to recite Kaddish for other relatives, even though there is an obligation to mourn for them.

Customs for reciting the Mourner's Kaddish vary markedly among various communities. In Sephardi synagogues, the custom is that all the mourners stand and chant the Kaddish together. In Ashkenazi synagogues before the 19th century, one mourner was chosen to lead the prayer on behalf of the rest, but gradually over the last two centuries, most (but certainly not all) communities have adopted the Sephardi custom. In many Reform synagogues, the entire congregation recites the Mourner's Kaddish together. This is sometimes said to be for those victims of the Holocaust who have no one left to recite the Mourner's Kaddish on their behalf and in support of the mourners. In some congregations (especially Reform and Conservative ones), the Rabbi reads a list of the deceased who have a Yahrzeit on that day (or who have died within the past month), and then ask the congregants to name any people they are mourning for. Some synagogues, especially Orthodox and Conservative ones, multiply the number of times that the Mourner's Kaddish is recited, for example by reciting a separate Mourner's Kaddish after both Aleinu and then each closing Psalm. Other synagogues limit themselves to one Mourner's Kaddish at the end of the service. And still in other communities where they preserve the original custom to only allow one person to recite each Kaddish, the number of Kaddishim recited depends on how many mourners are present.

Notably, the Mourner's Kaddish does not mention death at all, but instead praises God. Though the Kaddish is often popularly referred to as the "Jewish Prayer for the Dead," that designation more accurately belongs to the prayer called "El Malei Rachamim", which specifically prays for the soul of the deceased. The Mourner's Kaddish can be more accurately represented as an expression of "justification for judgment" by the mourners on their loved ones' behalf. It is believed that mourners adopted this version of the Kaddish around the 13th century during harsh persecution of Jews by crusaders in Germany because of the opening messianic line about God bringing the dead back to life, although this line is no longer said in the Ashkenazi rite.

=== Women and the Mourner's Kaddish ===
There is evidence of some women saying the Mourner's Kaddish for their parents at the grave, during shiva, and in daily prayers since the 17th century. Yair Bacharach concluded that technically a woman can recite the Mourner's Kaddish, but since this is not the common practice, it should be discouraged in Pitchei Teshuvah YD 376:3. As such, women reciting kaddish is controversial in some Orthodox communities, and it is almost unheard of in Haredi communities. Nevertheless, Ahron Soloveichik ruled that in our time, we should permit women to say Kaddish, and this is a common (but not universal) practice in Modern Orthodox circles. In 2013, the Israeli Orthodox rabbinical organization Beit Hillel issued a halachic ruling that women may say the Kaddish in memory of their deceased parents in the presence of a minyan. In Conservative, Reform, and Reconstructionist Judaism, the Mourner's Kaddish is traditionally said by women who are there also counted in the minyan.

== In the arts ==
The Kaddish has been a particularly common theme and reference point in the arts, including the following:

=== In literature and publications ===
(Alphabetical by author)

- In Shai Afsai's "The Kaddish" (2010), a poignant short story that could happen in almost any town with a small Jewish community, a group of elderly men trying to form a minyan in order to recite the Kaddish confront the differences between Judaism's denominations.
- In the first chapter of Sholem Aleichem's novel Motl, Peysi the Cantor's Son the boy narrator, whose father just died, needs to quickly learn by heart the Kaddish - which he would have to recite - and struggling with the incomprehensible Aramaic words.
- Kaddish is a poem, divided into 21 sections and of almost 700 pages length, by German poet Paulus Böhmer. The first ten sections appeared in 2002, the remaining eleven in 2007. It celebrates the world, through mourning its demise.
- Kaddish in Dublin (1990) is a crime novel by John Brady where an Irish Jew is involved with a plot to subvert the Irish government.
- Nathan Englander's third novel, Kaddish.com (2019), is about a grieving son who discovers a website that for a fee will match dead relatives with pious students who will recite the Mourner's Kaddish thrice daily on their behalf. In this manner, he outsources his obligation to recite kaddish for his father.
- In Nathan Englander's novel set during the Dirty Wars in Argentina, The Ministry of Special Cases, the protagonist is an Argentinian Jew named Kaddish.
- In Torch Song Trilogy (1982), written by Harvey Fierstein, the main character Arnold Beckoff says the Mourner's Kaddish for his murdered lover, Alan, much to the horror of his homophobic mother.
- In Frederick Forsyth's novel The Odessa File, a Jew who commits suicide in 1960s Germany requests in his diary/suicide note that someone say Kaddish for him in Israel. At the end of the novel, a Mossad agent involved in the plot, who comes into possession of the diary, fulfils the dead man's wish.
- Kaddish is one of the most celebrated poems by beat poet Allen Ginsberg. It appeared in Kaddish and Other Poems, a collection he published in 1961. The poem was dedicated to his mother, Naomi Ginsberg (1894–1956).
- Kaddish is a novel by Yehiel De-Nur, in which he explores actual, semi-fictional, and fictional stories relating to Hebrew struggles during the Holocaust.
- Kaddish for an Unborn Child is a novel by the Hungarian Nobel Laureate Imre Kertész.
- "Who Will Say Kaddish?: A Search for Jewish Identity in Contemporary Poland," text by Larry N Mayer with photographs by Gary Gelb (Syracuse University Press, 2002)
- In the September 20, 1998 Nickolodeon's Rugrats comic strip, the character Grandpa Boris recites the Mourner's Kaddish in the synagogue. This particular strip led to controversy with the Anti-Defamation League.
- The Mystery of Kaddish. Rav "DovBer Pinson". Explains and explores the Kabbalistic and deeper meaning of the Kaddish.
- In Philip Roth's novel The Human Stain, the narrator states that the Mourner's Kaddish signifies that "a Jew is dead. Another Jew is dead. As though death were not a consequence of life but a consequence of having been a Jew."
- “Kaddish” is the penultimate and longest piece in poet Sam Sax's chapbook STRAIGHT, in which he tells the story of the death of the speaker's first love due to an overdose, following narratives of the speaker's own addiction. In August 2016, Sax performed this poem at the Rustbelt Regional Poetry Slam.
- Zadie Smith's novel, The Autograph Man, revolves around Alex-Li Tandem, a dealer in autograph memorabilia whose father's Yahrzeit is approaching. The epilogue of the novel features a scene in which Alex-Li recites Kaddish with a minyan.
- Several references to the Mourner's Kaddish are made in Night by Elie Wiesel. Though the prayer is never directly said, references to it are common, including to times when it is customarily recited, but omitted.
- Leon Wieseltier's Kaddish (1998) is a book length hybrid of memoirs (of the author's year of mourning after the death of his father), history, historiography and philosophical reflection, all centered on the mourner's Kaddish.

=== In music ===
(Alphabetical by creator)

- Matthew J. Armstrong quotes the final lines ('oseh shalom bimromav...) in his work "Elegy for Dachau" (2009).
- Kaddish is the name of Symphony No. 3 by Leonard Bernstein, a dramatic work for orchestra, mixed chorus, boys' choir, speaker and soprano solo dedicated to the memory of John F. Kennedy who was assassinated on November 22, 1963, just weeks before the first performance of this symphony. The symphony is centered on the Kaddish text.
- The Kaddish is spoken in Part V of the Avodath Hakodesh (Sacred Service) by the composer Ernest Bloch (1933).
- Canadian poet/songwriter/artist Leonard Cohen uses words from the Kaddish in his 2016 final album entitled "You Want It Darker", specifically in the title song, during the chorus.
- Kaddish is a work for cello and orchestra by David Diamond.
- The Israeli rapper Dudu Faruk has mentioned the kaddish in the lyrics of his 2018 song, "Eliran Sabag"
- Kaddish is a track by Gina X Performance.
- "Kaddish" is the 34th movement in La Pasión según San Marcos by composer Osvaldo Golijov.
- "Kaddish" is a song by Ofra Haza from her album Desert Wind.
- Nili Isenberg put the words of kaddish to the tune of "Hello" while reciting kaddish for her father.
- Kaddish is the title of a 1979 composition for solo horn by the Russian-Israeli composer Lev Kogan (1927-2007).
- The final words of Rabbi Levi Yitzchok of Berditchev's A Din Toire mit Gott ("A Lawsuit with God," also known as The Kaddish of Rabbi Levi Yitzchok) are "Yisgadal v'Yiskadash Shemey Rabbah".
- Kaddish is the title for a work by W. Francis McBeth for a concert band, based on the chant of the prayer. McBeth composed this work as a memorial for his teacher J. Clifton Williams.
- Kaddish (ladder) canon is the final piece on the album "These are the Generations" by Larry Polansky. It is an elegy for friends recently lost.
- The French composer Maurice Ravel composed a song for voice and piano using part of the Kaddish. It was commissioned in 1914 by Alvina Alvi as part of a set of two songs: "Deux mélodies hébraïques" and was first performed in June 1914 by Alvi with Ravel at the piano.
- Kaddish Shalem is a musical work by Salamone Rossi (1570–c. 1628), composed for five voices in homophonic style, the very first polyphonic setting of this text, in his "Hashirim Asher L'Shlomo", The Song of Solomon.
- Inspired by Kaddish is a fifteen-movement musical composition by Lawrence Siegel. One of the movements is the prayer itself; the remaining fourteen are stories of the experiences of a number of Holocaust survivors Lawrence interviewed. It was debuted by the Keene State College Chamber Singers in 2008.
- Mieczysław Weinberg's Symphony No. 21 is subtitled "Kaddish". The symphony, composed in 1991, is dedicated to Holocaust victims from the Warsaw Ghetto.
- Concept album Kaddish (1993) created by Richard Wolfson with Andy Saunders using the band name Towering Inferno.
- The song "Israel" by Ween on the album Shinola, Vol. 1 is a recitation of the mourner's Kaddish.

=== In visual arts ===
(Alphabetical by creator)

- Clay artist Steven Branfman threw chawan (Japanese style tea bowls) every day for a year in honor of his departed son Jared who died from brain cancer in 2005 at the age of 23. For a year, they were the only pots he made. One chawan each day, no matter where he was. He and his family said Kaddish every day for a year. His daily chawan made at his potter's wheel was his own personal Kaddish. Ten years later, an exhibition displaying all 365 Kaddish Chawan titled A Father's Kaddish was held in the Thayer Academy Gallery. The online presentation of the exhibition can be seen on the website of The Potters Shop & School. Subsequently, an award-winning documentary of the same title was made by Spencer Films Jennifer Kaplan Producer/Director. The exhibition is also included in The Teabowl: East and West, by Bonnie Kemske.
- Artist Mauricio Lasansky, familiar with Kaddish from his background, produced his Kaddish series of eight intaglio prints, ten years after his Nazi Drawings, his statement of Nazi destruction and degradation. In 1978, Lasansky completed his answer of peace and survival, his Kaddish prints.
- Artist Max Miller traveled from synagogue to synagogue throughout New York and beyond, reciting the daily prayer in memory of his father and then painting a watercolor study of the synagogue in which he recited it.
- Following the deaths of both her parents within one week of one another, artist Wendy Meg Siegel created a painting with a focus on the Kaddish, as part of her canvas on canvas "text-tures" series, which explores methods of combining text and canvas in a somewhat “sculptural” manner.

=== Online ===
(Alphabetical by creator)

- Mira Z. Amiras and Erin L. Vang have taken the Kaddish as a starting point for a yearlong collaboration titled, "Kaddish in Two-Part Harmony", consisting of a jointly written blog and daily podcast recording of Lev Kogan's "Kaddish" for solo horn.
- David Bogomolny chronicled his yearlong recitation of kaddish in honor of his father Dr. Alexander Bogomolny, originally on The Times of Israel blogs, in a series titled, "The skeptic's kaddish for the atheist", consisting of traditional Jewish sources, religious text analysis, modern interpretations and expressions of kaddish, philosophy, theology, eschatology, creative writing, and the personal reflections; memories; and experiences of a son in mourning.
- From 2016 to 2017, Rabbi Ariana Katz recorded a podcast called "Kaddish" focused on mourning ritual and customs, featuring first person storytelling and interviews, using Jewish tradition to contextualize and deepen themes of the show, and holding space at the intersection of life and death. "Kaddish" covered topics including mourning chosen family, reproductive loss, illness, ritual writing, suicide, LGBT burial, tattoos and conversion status, and state violence. Featured guests shared their personal and professional expertise and story.

=== Onscreen, in film ===
(Chronological)

- In the 1973 film Les aventures de Rabbi Jacob (The Mad Adventures of Rabbi Jacob), it is chanted at the end of the Bar-Mitzvah service.
- In the film The Passover Plot (1976), a revived Jesus dies finally and is mourned with a Kaddish recitation by a disciple.
- In the film Mikey and Nicky (1976), while an inebriated Nicky (John Cassavetes) is laughing in front of his mother's grave, the disquieted Mikey (Peter Falk) attempts to recite the Kaddish despite the distractions from his friend.
- In the 1980 film The Jazz Singer starring Neil Diamond, character Cantor Rabinovitch (Laurence Olivier) says the Kaddish while disowning his son. The Kaddish helps bring forth the power needed to evoke the emotion of loss.
- In Rocky III (1982), Rocky Balboa recites the Mourner's Kaddish for Mickey.
- In the film Yentl (1983), at Yentl's father's burial, the rabbi asks who will say Kaddish (Kaddish is traditionally said by a son). Yentl replies that she will and, to the horror of those assembled, grabs the siddur and starts saying Kaddish.
- Steve Brand's feature documentary Kaddish (1984), about Yossi Klein Halevi's growing up as the child of his Holocaust survivor father, was named by the New York-based Village Voice as one of the ten best films of the year. It won the Special Jury Prize at the 1985 Sundance Film Festival.
- In Torch Song Trilogy (1988), Arnold (portrayed by playwright Harvey Fierstein) says the Mourner's Kaddish for his murdered lover, Alan, and Arnold's mother (portrayed by Anne Bancroft) strongly protests.
- The Kaddish is recited in the film Schindler's List (1993), in the last scene at the factory.
- Film Saying the Kaddish (1999) by Dan Frazer
- The Mourner's Kaddish can be heard being recited by Collins and Roger during the song La Vie Bohème in the 2005 film adaptation of the musical Rent along with Dies irae and Kyrie eleison.
- Konstantin Fam's Kaddish (2019) centers on the testament of a former concentration camp prisoner who confronts and turns the lives of two young people from different worlds around, shedding light on the tragic history of their family.
- The Kaddish as a form of religious excommunication (when recited for someone still alive) appears in the fantasy-documentary A Kaddish For Bernie Madoff (2021), created by musician/poet Alicia Jo Rabins and directed by Alicia J. Rose. The film tells the story of Madoff and the system that allowed him to function for decades through the eyes of Rabins, who watches the financial crash from her 9th floor studio in an abandoned office building on Wall Street.

=== Onscreen, in television ===
(Alphabetical by program title)

- In the television series Babylon 5, Lt. Comdr. Susan Ivanova finally decides to sit Shiva and recite the Mourner's Kaddish at the end of episode "TKO" (Season 1, Ep. 14), for her father with an old family friend, Rabbi Koslov, who has come to the station to urge her to mourn.
- In the television series Drawn Together, Toot Braunstein recites the Mourner's Kaddish in the episode "A Very Special Drawn Together Afterschool Special", after saying that her son was (metaphorically) dead.
- In the television show Everwood, Ephram Brown recites the Mourner's Kaddish at his mother's unveiling.
- In the second-season finale of Homeland, "The Choice", CIA agent Saul Berenson (Mandy Patinkin) recites the Mourner's Kaddish while standing over the corpses of victims of a terrorist attack.
- "Kaddish" is the title of Homicide: Life on the Street episode 5.17, in which detective John Munch (Richard Belzer), who is Jewish, investigates the rape and murder of his childhood sweetheart.
- Kaddish For Uncle Manny", episode 4.22 of Northern Exposure (first aired 5-3-93) relates to Joel's (Rob Morrow) seeking out of ten Jews in remote Alaska to join him for Kaddish in memory of his recently departed Uncle Manny in New York City. Joel eventually decides, though, that saying Kaddish for his uncle is best accomplished in the presence of the Cicely family, who although Gentile, are most near and dear to him.
- In the television show The Patient, episode 1.7, Dr. Strauss recites the Kaddish for his recently deceased wife.
- The second season of the series Quantico, FBI Special Agent Nimah Amin, herself a Muslim, recites the Mourner's Kaddish at Simon Asher's unveiling.
- In the Superman: The Animated Series episode "Apokolips...Now!", a Rabbi recites Kaddish at Dan Turpin's funeral. An onscreen, post-episode message dedicated the episode to Jack Kirby, a Jewish comic book artist, who influenced much of the comic book community.
- In the series Touched by an Angel, episode 3.5 (season 3, episode 5), Henry Moskowitz, a proud archaeologist on a dig at a Navajo excavation site, receives a surprise visit from zayda (grandfather). Sam hopes to reconcile with his grandson and Jewish family faith by asking him to say kaddish.
- "Kaddish" is the title of The X-Files episode 4.15 (season 4, episode 15), in which a Golem is avenging a murder.

=== Onstage, in dance, theater and musicals ===
- In Tony Kushner's play Angels in America, the characters of Louis Ironson and Ethel Rosenberg say the Kaddish over Roy Cohn's dead body. Louis, a non-practicing Jew, mistakenly identifies the Kaddish as being written in Hebrew.
- Kaddish is a female dance solo choreographed by Anna Sokolow to music by Maurice Ravel.
- The Mourner's Kaddish can be heard being recited by Collins and Roger during the song "La Vie Bohème" in the musical Rent.
- A brief portion of the Mourner's Kaddish (lines 34-36 above) is recited during the song "Prayer" in the musical Come from Away.

== See also ==
- Bereavement in Judaism
