= Solihull School =

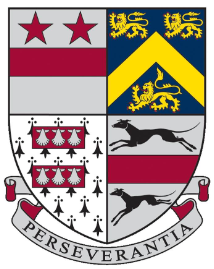

Location
- Warwick Road; Solihull, West Midlands, B91 3DJ; England; 52.4150°N 1.7702°W

Information
- Type: Public school Private day school
- Motto: Perseverantia (By perseverance)
- Established: 1560; 466 years ago
- Department for Education URN: 104124 Tables
- Headmaster: Charles Fillingham
- Chaplain: Revd. Rachel Hill Brown
- Gender: Co-educational
- Age: 3 to 18
- Enrolment: c.1500
- Houses: Fetherston; Jago; Pole; Shenstone; Windsor
- Colours: Maroon, Blue
- Publication: The Shenstonian
- Alumni: Old Silhillians
- Website: http://www.solsch.org.uk/

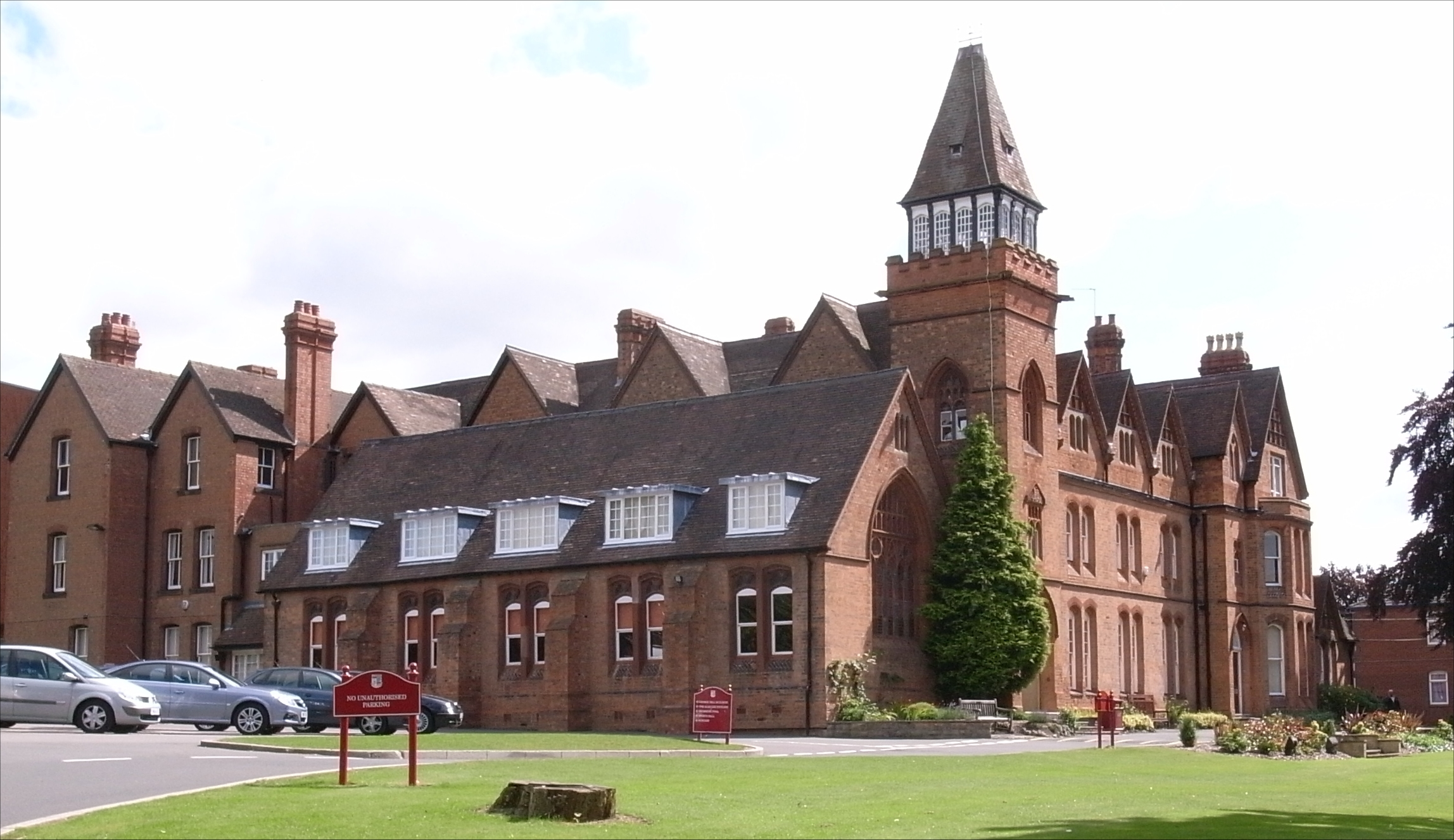
School House, designed by J. A. Chatwin in 1883

Solihull School is an award-winning co-educational independent day school for pupils aged 3 to 18 in Solihull, West Midlands, England. Founded in 1560, it is the oldest school in Solihull and a member of the Headmasters' and Headmistresses' Conference. The school operates across two principal campuses, with the Preparatory School at the Saint Martin's campus and the Senior School at the Warwick Road campus.

== History ==
In 1560 the revenues of the chantry chapels of St Mary and St Katherine in the parish church of St Alphege, Solihull were diverted for the endowment of a school for boys. The revenue of the chapel of St Alphege was added to the fund six years later, enhancing the capacity of the school. The education remained based in teachings of the Church and the desire to turn out 'respectable, thoughtful, successful young gentlemen'.

In the 17th century it became a boarding school and the number of pupils grew. The school became more notable and well thought of owing to the involvement of several prominent families. Much of this development came under the Headmastership of the Rev. Richard Mashiter who, in 1735, was famously elected ahead of Samuel Johnson, the celebrated author, essayist, and lexicographer. Johnson was passed over because the school's directors thought he was "a very haughty, ill-natured gent., and that he has such a way of distorting his fface [sic] (which though he can't help) the gent[s] think it may affect some lads in the pursuit of learning". The successful applicant Mashiter was, by marriage, related to the aristocratic Holbeche family and his daughter married John Short, a well-respected surgeon in Solihull who would go on to serve the school as a Feoffee for 57 years. Short's six sons were all educated at Solihull School and became professionally and socially successful. One of them, Robert Short, rose to the rank of Lieutenant-Colonel in the army of the East India Company and later became 54th Lord of The Manor of Solihull. Owing to a strong affection for Solihull School he expressly recommended it to his fellow officers and peers, according to the diaries of Caroline Clive.

In around 1879 the feoffees were replaced by a board of Governors who allowed £4,345 to be made available for an architect, J. A. Chatwin, to be commissioned to build a new school on a new site for 80 day boys and 20 boarders. Upon the building's completion in 1882, the school relocated to the new site on the Warwick Road from its previous location on the edge of Brueton Park. 'School House' is now a grade II listed building. Expansion continued on this Warwick Road site into the 20th century. Over the course of the 20th century the school grew steadily from 200 to nearly 1000 pupils.

In 1960 a new chapel was built and was named The Chapel of St Mary and St Katherine to commemorate the origins of the school.

In 1962 the school was visited by Queen Elizabeth II.

In the early 1970s the school admitted girls into the Sixth Form for the first time. Only ten girls joined in the first year, but this grew quickly over the following years, until 2002 when for the first time as many girls entered the Sixth Form as did boys.

In September 2005 the school began a transition to becoming fully co-educational, at first admitting girls into all four years of the Junior School and at 11+ level, beginning a process which was completed in 2009, when the first third form (year 7) girls reached upper fifth (year 11). The 2015-2016 academic year marked the first girls to go through the whole school from J1 to upper sixth.

In 2010 Solihull School celebrated its 450th anniversary. Both the school and the Old Silhillians' Association hosted a range of ceremonial, musical and sporting events to mark the historic occasion.

A sapling taken from the tree that Anne Frank could see from her hiding place in Amsterdam was planted at Solihull School as part of Remembrance Day commemorations 2015. The tree was planted by 86-year-old Auschwitz survivor Mindu Hornick; at an age comparable to that Anne Frank would have been.

In 2020 Solihull School merged with nearby girls school St Martins School. Today the former St Martins Campus houses the Prep School.

== Facilities ==
The school is based across two campuses. Solihull Senior School on the Warwick Road campus currently occupies a site of approximately 65 acres (260,000 m^{2}). This is partly as a result of a former headmaster, Warin Foster Bushell, who in the 1920s bought much of the land himself when the governors refused to finance the purchase out of school funds. On his retirement Bushell sold the fields to the school at no profit. The school's quadrangle and surrounding classrooms, as well as the former hall, known as Big School, were built after this period, and were followed by a chapel and large teaching block and sports hall, amongst other additions. Solihull School has a number of rugby pitches, cricket squares and nets, tennis courts, football pitches and general purpose sports fields. There is a floodlit artificial pitch on the school's main campus, incorporating 2, 8x40 warm-up areas. The pitch is used primarily for hockey in the winter months and in the summer term the pitch affords a further 8 tennis courts and a multi-purpose training/coaching area.

One mile away, at Copt Heath, the school has another 13 acres (53,000 m^{2}) of fields, comprising 4 rugby pitches, a new floodlit artificial pitch and a cricket square. These 13 acres (53,000 m^{2}) are a part of the site that is home to the school's former pupils' organisation, the Old Silhillians' Association.

The school possesses a mountain cottage in Snowdonia, North Wales. The cottage was presented to the school in 1958 by the parents of David Fricke, who was a school pupil between 1946-1956, following his death. David was a keen mountain walker and it was felt that the cottage would be a fitting tribute to his memory. Most pupils will visit the cottage as part of Snowdonia School in the shell forms. Those taking part in CCF or the Duke of Edinburgh award scheme may also use this facility on other occasions.

In 1990 a building was constructed to house the junior school. This was followed by the extension of the science laboratories in 1995; the renovation of most classrooms, in 1998; and the conversion of Big School into a library, and the construction of a new hall and theatre building, completed in 2002, named the Bushell Hall after the former headmaster. A new pavilion was constructed in 2003, named the Alan Lee Pavilion after another former headmaster (1983–1996) who died shortly after its completion.

Opened in September 2005, a building provides fifteen new teaching rooms for the classics, history, economics and business studies, religious studies and IT departments. There is also a multi-purpose teaching room and a social area. It has been named the George Hill building after a governor of the school who died shortly before its completion. George Hill's business acumen helped secure the school's financial position throughout the 20th century.

In 2007, the governors of the school commissioned a new music school to be built for the 450th anniversary of the school. Building work started on the music school in 2008 with it scheduled for completion in 2010. It was later named the David Turnbull Music School, after a former director of music.

Building of a new sixth form centre - The Cooper Building - commenced in the summer of 2014 and completed in 2015. In November 2019, Solihull opened its newly refurbished refectory. In September 2019, Solihull announced its merger with Saint Martin's School from September 2020. Solihull Preparatory School (aged 3 – 11) is located on the Saint Martin's campus and Solihull Senior School (11 – 18 years) on the Warwick Road campus.

There are over 1,500 pupils, 440 at Solihull Preparatory School and 1,100 in Solihull Senior School.

== School houses ==
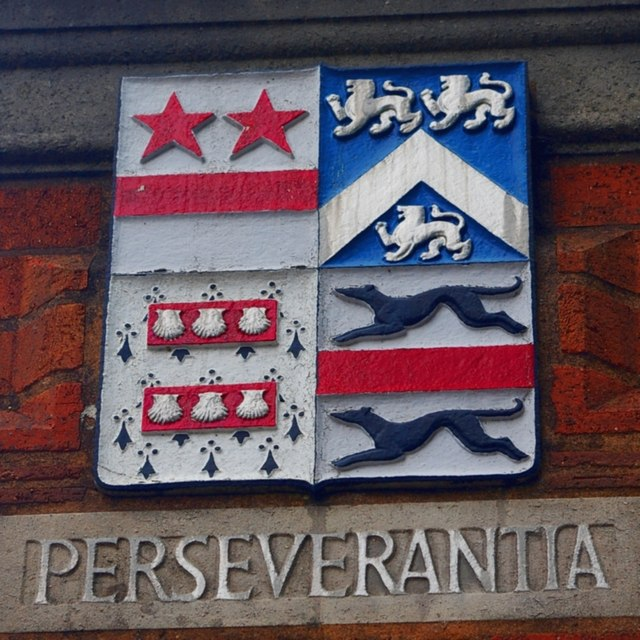
Badge of Solihull School

- Fetherston (Yellow) – named after Barnaby Fetherston who was the first usher of the school; a post that today would be called deputy master. Fetherston was instrumental in obtaining donations of land from Henry Hugford, Thomas Dabridgecourt, Thomas Waring and Thomas Greswolde. The later three have their arms incorporated in the school badge.
- Jago (Red) – named after 18th-century poet and Old Silhillian Richard Jago. Jago went to University College, Oxford and then returned to Warwickshire, eventually entering the clergy.
- Pole (Light Blue) – named after the school's first headmaster.
- Shenstone (Black) – named after 18th-century poet, Old Silhillian, classmate and lifelong friend of Jago, William Shenstone. Shenstone went to Pembroke College, Oxford and then returned home to manage his family's estate. On sporting occasions they are often referred to as the 'All Blacks', owing to their black shirts.
- Windsor (Navy Blue) – created in 1959 as a mark of respect to the royal family. Shortly afterwards, in 1960 and 1962, the school received two royal visits; from The Duchess of Kent and Queen Elizabeth II respectively.

== School structure ==
The school is divided into sections. These form the basis of the pastoral structure of the school.

Solihull Preparatory School (Saint Martin's campus)

- Nursery
- Reception
- Infants - I1 and I2
- Junior School – J1, J2, J3, J4 (academic years 3, 4, 5, 6)

Solihull Senior School (Warwick Road campus)

- Lower School – Thirds, Shells, Fourths (7, 8, 9)
- Middle School – Lower Fifth, Upper Fifth (10, 11)
- Upper School – Lower Sixth, Upper Sixth (12, 13)

== Sport ==
Facitilies include rugby pitches, cricket squares, football pitches, an all-weather pitch, all-weather training areas, tennis courts, Athletics facilities (running track and jumps/throws areas), rifle range, an indoor swimming pool and two gymnasiums.

Boys' games

- Rugby union is the main competitive team sport and is played from the age of 11 onwards. The first XV traditionally play in a dark blue jersey with narrow, horizontal white and maroon stripes, white shorts and dark blue, maroon and white socks. The striped jersey has, in recent years, been swapped for a maroon shirt with blue sleeves. The teams have recently done well nationally, the first XV having won the Daily Mail Vase Cup in 2011 at Twickenham, which is the furthest the school has ever reached. Solihull School regularly produces players who attain representative honours at county level and beyond. The Big Side teams tour biennially to, amongst other countries, Australia, South Africa, Canada and New Zealand. In 2025, the school's senior rugby and netball squad toured South Africa. The U15 age group travel to Italy or France each year to play against several club sides. Solihull School also plays rugby sevens, competing at national tournaments such as The National Schools Sevens at Rosslyn Park, Blackpool Sevens and Fylde Sevens. The Old Boys fixture is always an anticipated and contested event, with many pupils, Old Silhillians and parents turning out to watch the current XV compete against a selection of Old Silhillians. The match, held in early December, is usually preceded by a barbecue and followed by drinks, speeches and presentations in the Alan Lee pavilion.
- Hockey is also a sport. The first XI have scored victories over Rugby School and Warwick School, both of which are local rivals, advancing through the rounds of the regional and national cup competitions in the process.
- Football has been adopted into the curriculum in the Senior School and the 1st XI compete in the ISFA.
- Cricket has produced players who have represented Warwickshire CCC at first-class level. Both batsmen and bowlers from Solihull School have been cited in the Wisden Cricketers' Almanack for their performance over the course of a season. The school's recently formed Twenty20 team, who play in an all red kit, compete at various Twenty20 schools' tournaments around the country.
- Athletics – The school provides representatives for the Solihull Borough athletics team, as well and the West Midlands and Midlands teams. Daniel Caines, former world champion indoor 400m runner, is an Old Silhillian.

Girls' games

- Hockey is the main winter sport for girls. The team competes in regional and national competitions.
- Cricket is the main summer sport for the girls. In 2023 and 2024 they were National Plate Champions, and in February 2026 they went on the first ever girls cricket tour to South Africa.
- Rounders is played in the summer and the first team play schools from across the country.
- Netball has a 1st and 2nd team competing during the summer term. The teams play in identical kits to that of the rounders team.
- Athletics. The squad travel to, and compete at many of the same competitions as the boys. The girls do not take part in as many invitational meetings as the boys' team.

Sports as such golf, shooting, swimming, cross country, tennis, squash, badminton and ultimate frisbee are all played within the school and teams are put forward to compete against other schools.

School Colours

- School Colours have been bestowed upon Solihull School pupils who have represented the school at a high level in their chosen sport. The reward takes the form of a dark blue blazer with narrow red and white vertical stripes.

Since 2006 it has been possible for those pupils who have achieved in debating, leadership, drama, music or community service to also be awarded school colours. When a pupil achieves school colours, they get a silver school crest that goes on the breast pocket. Those achieving "double colours" get a gold crest to replace the silver.

== School publications ==
- The Shenstonian is the school's annual publication and reviews the academic, sporting and other events within the school. It chronicles the achievements of pupils and publishes works of arts, poetry and prose. The editor is a member of staff. It is named, as is one of the houses, after the notable poet and Old Silhillian William Shenstone.
- The Silhillian is the annual alumni magazine. It includes news of the school, messages from the committee, news of former pupils, reminiscences of School, news of the Old Silhillian sports clubs and obituaries of Old Silhillians and former teachers.
- Several pupil led publications - including History and Politics, Science and English) are published and distributed every term.

== Notable alumni ==
=== Sport ===
- Richard Masters, Chief Executive of the Premier League
- Daniel Caines, athlete
- John Curry, figure skater
- Adrian Ellison, Olympic rowing coxswain 1984
- Frank Foster, England cricketer
- Will Grigg, Northern Ireland footballer
- James Hudson, rugby union player
- Richard Johnson, cricketer
- Keith Jones, cricketer
- Matthew Macklin, middleweight boxer
- Bert Millichip, former chairman of the Football Association
- Jim Proudfoot, football commentator
- Bernard Quaife, cricketer
- Mike Rawson, Olympic middle distance runner
- Jamie Spires, cricketer
- James Wallis, Great-Britain hockey player
- Aoife Mannion, Footballer, Manchester United

=== Arts and entertainment ===
- Adrian Nicholas Godfrey aka Nikki Sudden, singer-songwriter
- Philip Achille, harmonica player
- Cecil Aldin, artist and illustrator
- James Barralet, cellist
- David Briggs, organist and composer
- Michael Buerk, broadcaster and journalist
- Mike Bullen, writer
- John Butt, conductor, organist, harpsichordist, and academic
- Stephen Cole, broadcast journalist and news presenter
- Laurence Cummings, harpsichordist, organist, and conductor
- Andy Dickens, jazz musician
- Richard Digby Day, stage director
- Richard Hammond, journalist and television presenter (Top Gear and The Grand Tour)
- Richard Jago, poet
- Stewart Lee, comedian
- Simon Mayo, BBC radio DJ and author
- Phil Oakey, singer and songwriter (The Human League)
- Theo Travis, musical artist
- Lizo Mzimba, journalist and television presenter
- Miles Ratledge drummer and co-founder of Napalm Death
- Tim Reid (comedy writer), comedy writer
- Ritchie Neville, musician
- Genesis P-Orridge, musician
- William Shenstone, poet
- John Taylor, classicist
- Johnnie Walker, radio DJ
- Richard Wolfson, musician of Fischer-Z and Towering Inferno

=== Other (including academic and military) ===
- Malcolm Burley, Antarctic explorer and Royal Navy commander
- John Butterfield, Baron Butterfield, master of Downing College, Cambridge (1976–83) and vice-chancellor of the University of Cambridge (1983–85)
- Richard Alan Cross, professor of philosophy at University of Notre Dame
- Stephen Eyre, High Court judge
- Sir Derek Higgs, businessman
- Jonathan Manns, urbanist and developer
- Stevie Parle, chef
- Laurence Rees, historian
- Frank H. T. Rhodes, president, Cornell University
- Robert Short, East India Company lieutenant-colonel
- Roger Tayler, astronomer, secretary (1971–79), treasurer (1979–87) and president (1989–90) of the Royal Astronomical Society
- David Tustin, suffragan Bishop of Grimsby
- Clive Upton, Professor of Modern English Language at the University of Leeds
- Robert Vilain, professor of German and comparative literature at the University of Bristol
- Richard R. Weber, Churchill Professor of Mathematics for Operational Research in the Statistical Laboratory, University of Cambridge

=== Politics and governance ===
- Air Vice Marshal Peter John Harding, Defence Services Secretary (1994–98)
- Christopher Ingham, diplomat, deputy head of mission and chargé d'affaires in Bucharest, ambassador to Uzbekistan, ambassador to Tajikistan
- Sir Donald Logan, diplomat, ambassador to Guinea (1960–62), information counsellor at the British embassy in Paris, ambassador to Bulgaria (1970–73), deputy UK representative to NATO (1973–75)
- Andrew MacKay, former Conservative MP for Bracknell and Deputy Chief Whip
- Sir Oliver Wright, diplomat, ambassador to West Germany (1975–81), ambassador to the United States, 1982–86).
