= Márta Sebestyén =

Hungarian vocalist, composer and actress

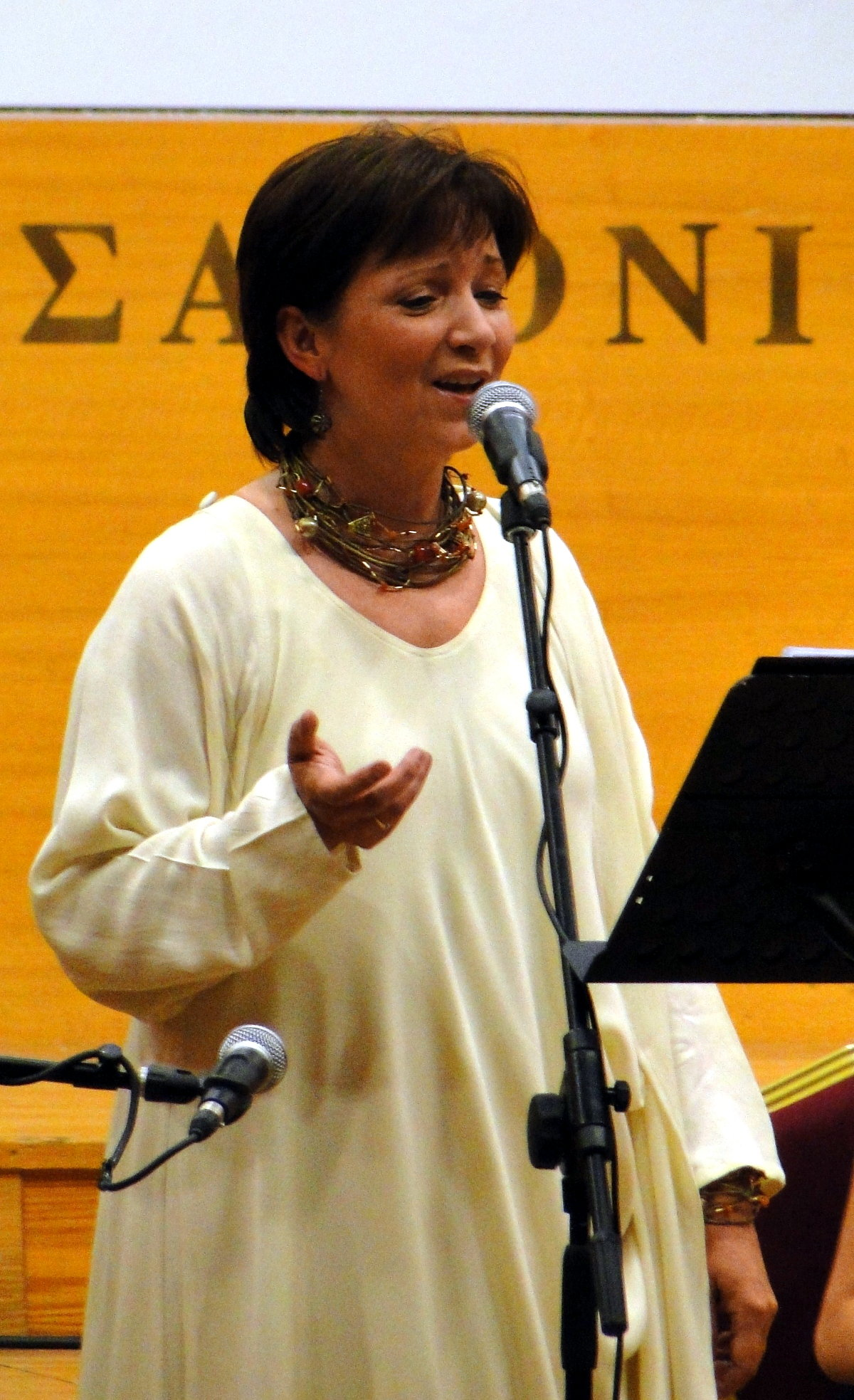
- Sebestyén performing in 2010

Background information
- Born: 19 August 1957 (age 69); Budapest, Hungary
- Occupations: Vocalist; composer; actress
- Instrument: Vocals
- Years active: 1987–present
- Label: Hannibal

Márta Sebestyén (Hungarian: [ˈmaːrtɒ ˈʃɛbɛʃceːn]; born 19 August 1957) is a Hungarian folk vocalist, composer and actress.

== Early life ==
Márta Sebestyén was born on 19 August 1957 in Budapest, Hungary. Her mother is a composer, and was a music student of Zoltán Kodály. Her father was an economist and author. When Sebestyén was seven years old, her father, returning from a trip to the U.S. as a visiting professor (under a grant from the Ford Foundation), brought home a large collection of ethnic music recordings from the Smithsonian Institution. Sebestyén was educated at Miklós Radnóti Grammar School, Budapest.

== Career ==
Sebestyén is a founding member of Hungarian folk group Muzsikás. She is known for adaptations of Somogy and Transylvanian folk songs, some of which appear in Deep Forest's Boheme album, which received the Grammy Award for Best World Music Album in 1995. She has also adapted Hindi, Yiddish, Serbian, Bulgarian, Slovak folk songs into traditional Hungarian style. She sang in and contributed material to the album Kaddish by Towering Inferno (Richard Wolfson and Andy Saunders, 1993). She also sang "Rivers" on the multiple artist album Big Blue Ball released in 2008.

Sebestyén's song "Szerelem, szerelem", performed with Muzsikás, featured in the movie The English Patient (1996). Three more songs she recorded with Muzsikás appeared in the Japanese anime film Only Yesterday (1991) by Studio Ghibli: "Teremtés" ("Creation"), "Hajnali nóta" ("Morning Song"), and "Fuvom az énekem" ("I Sing My Song"). Costa-Gavras' 1989 film Music Box featured the opening half of Sebestyén's song "Mária altatója".

On 1 June 2010, Sebestyén was awarded the UNESCO Artist for Peace title.

== Influence ==
Ivor Cutler was a fan of Sebestyén, citing her influence on several occasions, most notably in an article for The Guardian newspaper in January 2004. Cutler selected two of her songs for a CD (Cute, eh?) released in 1999 containing his favourite musical tracks. Cutler also chose songs by Sebestyén for his 1991 BBC Radio series, Cutler the Lax.

== Selected discography ==
=== As primary artist ===
- Márta Sebestyén and Muzsikás (Hannibal, 1987)
- Apocrypha (Hannibal, 1992)
- Kismet (Hannibal, 1996)

=== With Andy Irvine and Davy Spillane ===
- EastWind (Tara, 1992)

=== With various artists ===
- The Rough Guide to the Music of Eastern Europe (World Music Network, 1999)
- Big Blue Ball (Real World, Rykodisc, 2008)
