= Barn the Spoon =

British spoon carver and author (b. 1981)

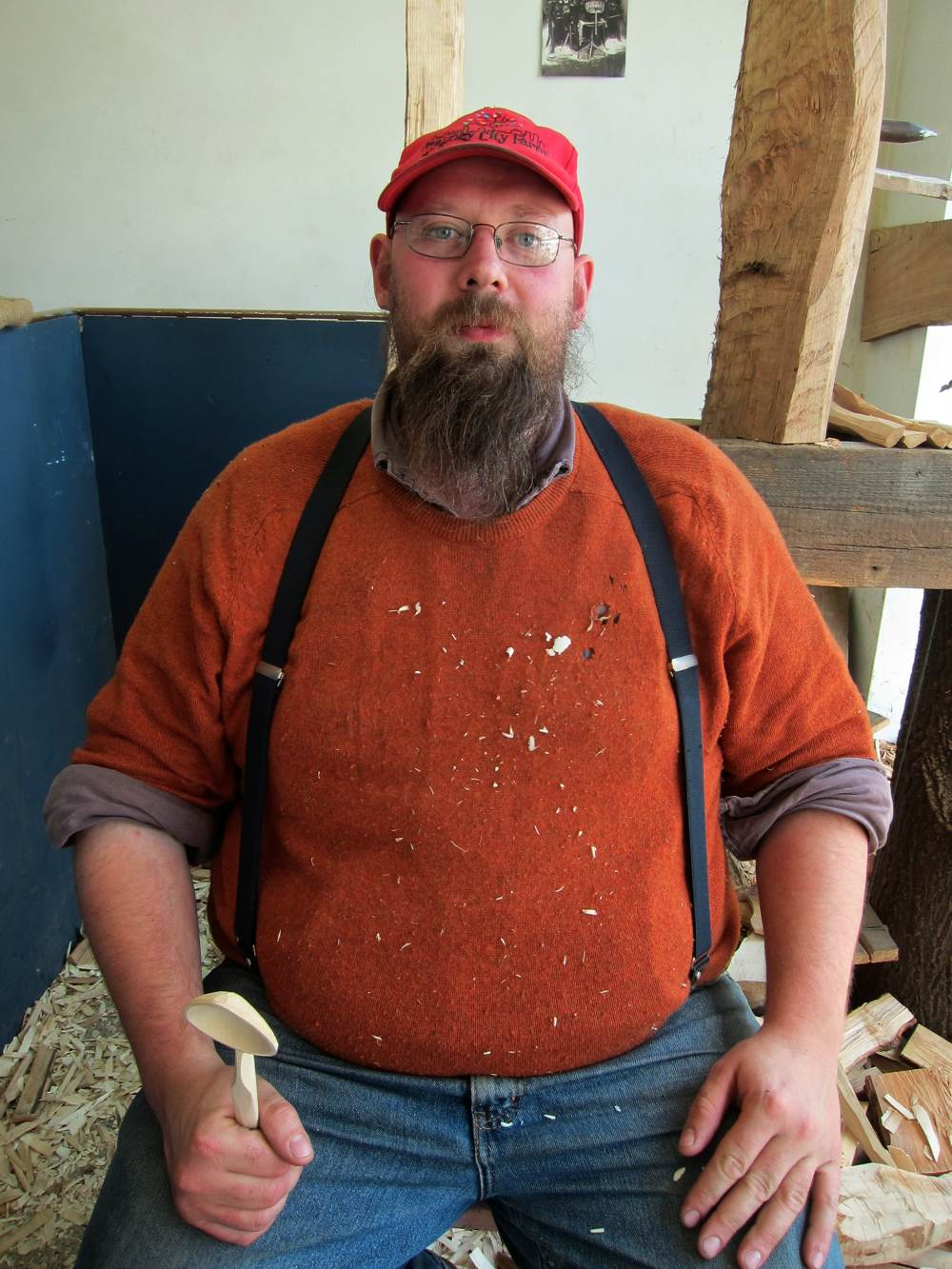
- Barn the Spoon
- Born: Barnaby Alexander Carder; 1981 (age 44–45); Oxford, Oxfordshire
- Occupations: Artist, spoon carver, author
- Website: barnthespoon.com

Barnaby Alexander Carder, known as Barn the Spoon (born 1981), is a British artisan spoon carver, teacher, author and co-founder of Spoonfest, the annual international festival of spoon carving in Edale in Derbyshire, UK. He is also founder of the Green Wood Guild, a collective of green wood carvers who run carving workshops and owns a spoon shop and woodworking venue in Hackney in London's East End. Carder also teaches spoon carving, woodworking and bladesmithing (with master smith Nic Westermann).

== Early life and education ==
Carder was born in Oxford in November 1981 and grew up in Berkshire. At the age of 12 a neighbour introduced him to woodturning by showing him how to make bowls and soon he had a lathe in the garage of his parents' house. He graduated from Bristol University with a degree in biology, intending initially to become a biology teacher before becoming apprenticed to a cabinet maker. After apprenticing himself to green wood worker Mike Abbott in Hereford, he then spent 3 years working in forestry and living in the forests, sourcing green wood. It was while living in the woods he began to carve and then sell spoons for a living travelling between Oxford and Bristol, finding that the spoons sold better in cities. Carder holds an official pedlar's licence for this purpose.

== Spoons and green wood carving ==
Carder is founder of The Green Wood Guild, London's school of traditional woodwork, based at Stepney City Farm. The guild provides courses in woodworking, carving, whittling and bladesmithing and runs two regular clubs, Whittlers Anonymous and Spoonclub.

Carder uses freshly cut (green) wood and traditional techniques to carve his spoons, usually using an axe, spoon knife (a curved bladed knife for hollowing out the bowl of the spoon), and small carving knife. The wood is sourced locally from parks in and around London and is recycled from trees which have been removed for conservation reasons. Carder states that a single spoon can take him from twenty minutes to two hours to carve. He opened his Hackney Road shop at the end of 2012 and carves in the shop window, where people often stop to watch.

Carder has a display of some of his spoons in the Fuller Craft Museum in Brockton, Massachusetts and his spoons have also sold in the Conran shop in Tokyo. In 2016 Carder and Robin Wood joined Stevie Parle during London Craft Week to explore wood-fired cooking and how dining from wooden utensils can affect the experience of eating. Carder has been described by the press as "legendary" and it has been said that "No one in Britain knows more about crafting a spoon from green wood than Barn the Spoon".

In May 2017 following the release of his book, Carder announced the lease on his shop is to expire and he hopes to leave London to be closer to nature. He launched a '1000 spoons' project where he intends to carve 1000 spoons from a single tree, using any profits to plant and maintain his own woodland.

== Teaching ==
Carder teaches spoon and bowl carving at his shop on the Hackney Road and has run courses at various other venues around the UK including Stepney City Farm, Tate Britain, the Pitt Rivers Museum and Heal's.

In May 2017 Carder published his first book, a spoon carving guide entitled Spon: A Guide to Spoon Carving and the New Wood Culture published by Penguin Books. 'Spon' refers to the Anglo-Saxon English word for a wood chip which is believed to be the etymological root of spoon. In it Carder shows techniques and the appropriate use of tools used in creating different types of spoon. Carder explains the need to think in three dimensions, as with other forms of sculpture, and has said "Perfection is always just a spoon away."

== Spoonfest ==
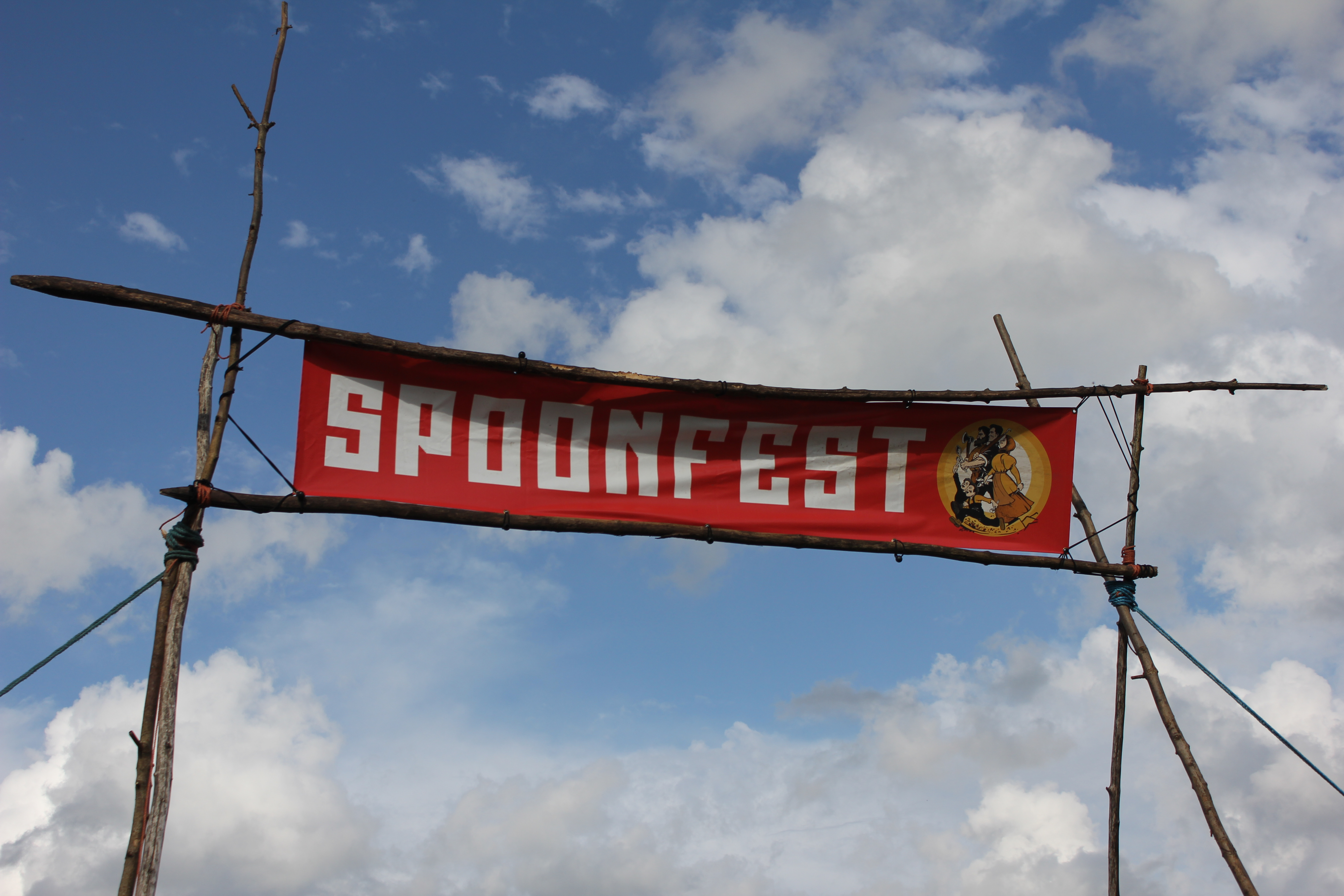
Banner entrance to Spoonfest

Carder is co-founder of Spoonfest with Robin Wood MBE (trustee and ex-chairman of the Heritage Crafts Association). Spoonfest is an annual international festival of spoon carving that has been held in Edale, Derbyshire since 2012, with 200 people attending in the first year.
