= Jon Crossland =

British designer and illustrator

Jon Crossland was a British designer and illustrator, known for having collaborated with great names in music designing the covers and leaflets of their albums, highlighting among many others, his collaboration with Pink Floyd, Kansas, Alan Parsons, Bruce Dickinson, The Cranberries, etc.

Crossland attended St Martin's School of Art, London, graduating in 1987 with a degree in graphic design. His first job out of college was as Neville Brody's assistant at his former studio in Tottenham Court Road. He worked extensively with Storm Thorgerson throughout the 1990s and contributed several designs, most notably Pink Floyd's 'Pulse' album cover. He has worked extensively in London and the United States as a freelance designer and illustrator. His poster design 'Stop The Burning' is on archive at the Victoria & Albert Museum in London.

== Work ==
Some of the most outstanding works are:

- 1988: Pink Floyd - Delicate Sound of Thunder
- 1988: Kansas - In the Spirit of Things
- 1995: Alan Parsons - Alan Parsons Live
- 1995: Renaissance - Da Capo
- 1995: Towering Inferno - Kaddish
- 1995: Pink Floyd - Pulse
- 1995: CD edition of Relics
- 1996: The Almighty - Just Add Life
- 1996: Bruce Dickinson - Skunkworks
- 1997: Fred Frith - Previous Evening
- 1997: Moodswings - Psychedelicatessen
- 1997: Jon Rose - Shopping.Live@Victo
- 1997: Phish - Slip, Stitch and Pass
- 1998: Ian Dury / Ian Dury & the Blockheads - Mr Love Pants
- 1999: The Cranberries - Bury the Hatchet
- 1999: The Cranberries - Promises
- 2000: International Music Series: Music of Italy
- 2000: International Music Series: Celtic Fiddle
- 2000: International Music Series: French Cafe Accordion
- 2000: International Music Series: Memories of Greece
- 2000: Guo Yi / Guo Yue - International Music Series: Music of China
- 2000: Jonathan Mayer - International Music Series: Music of India
- 2000: Tito Heredia / Dario Rossetti-Bonell - International Music Series: Spanish Guitar
- 2002: Healing Sixes - Enormosound
- 2002: The Cranberries - Treasure Box: The Complete Sessions, 1991-1999
