= Barralet =

Barralet is a surname. Notable people with the surname include:

- John James Barralet (c. 1747–1815), Irish artist
- James Barralet, British cellist

== See also ==
- Barrales
