= Robert Short (East India Company officer) =

Robert Short (30 December 1783 – 1859) was a lieutenant-colonel in the 21st Madras Native Infantry, Honourable East India Company. He later became 54th Lord of the Manor of Solihull.

== Early years ==
Short was born on 30 December 1783 in Solihull, Warwickshire. He was born to John and Jane Short, née Mashiter. John Short was a well-known and respected surgeon in Solihull and Jane was from an aristocratic family on her mother's side. Thus, Robert Short had a comfortable childhood and enjoyed the way of life that Solihull and the surrounding area afforded him; 'Urbs in rure' (town in the country) is the town's motto.

Short was educated at Solihull School with his five brothers. He was well known within the school even prior to his acceptance. His maternal grandfather, Rev. Richard Mashiter, had been Headmaster until 1769 and his father was a Feoffee; a position he held for 57 years. The young Short is said to have enjoyed his days at Solihull and always showed sporting talent.

== Career ==
Following Solihull School Short joined the Army of the Honourable East India Company and achieved the rank of lieutenant-colonel in the 21st Madras Native Infantry at a high point in the Company rule in India. He retired as an Honorary Colonel on 9 September 1830.

He was offered another job by the East India Company in India although upon his return to England he married Mary Astle in 1835 and so wanted to remain in the marital home. He took several jobs as a Justice of the Peace in 1838 and served for a 20-year period. He was also elected to the position of Guardian of the Poor Law Union and then as its chairman.

During his career he commended Solihull School to traders and his fellow officers resulting in an increase in reputation of the school.

== Latter years ==
He purchased the Lordship of the Manor of Solihulli in 1850 to become 54th Lord of the Manor.

He died in 1859 aged 75 and was buried at St Alphege on 2 July. Under his will the Lordship of the Manor passed to the Rev. John Couchman, eldest son of his sister Elizabeth. The Couchmans, who still live locally, remain Lords of the Manor. The Manor House, renamed Manor Cottage, passed to Robert's younger brother, Tomas who was Deputy Master at Rugby School having been beaten to the Headmastership by one Dr Thomas Arnold.
