= Barrales =

Barrales is a surname. Notable people with the surname include:

- Alejandra Barrales (born 1967), Mexican lawyer and politician
- Ernesto Javier Gómez Barrales (born 1978), Mexican politician
- Jerónimo Barrales (born 1987), Argentine footballer
- Ruben Barrales (born 1962), American bureaucrat

== See also ==
- Barralet
