= Rebecca Struthers =

English watchmaker

- Born: 1985 or 1986 (age 40–41)
- Spouse: Craig Struthers (m. 2012)
- Awards: Heritage Crafts Association President's Award
- Website: strutherswatchmakers.co.uk

Rebecca Struthers (born 1985 or 1986) is an English watchmaker, historian, author, engineer, and gemmologist. She works with her husband, Craig, who is a master watchmaker. She won the Heritage Crafts award in 2021, presented by King Charles III. She is the only practising watchmaker in the United Kingdom with a PhD in horology.

== Career ==
Struthers and her now husband, Craig went to Birmingham City University. Struthers originally studied goldsmithing and then changed to watchmaking, while Craig studied horology. In 2017, she got a doctorate in horology. The watchmaking course that the two took no longer exists. After graduating from university, Struthers moved to London to work in auction houses, doing restoring and watch dealing. After moving to Birmingham, she and her husband started working in their workshop in 2012 which is in the Jewellery Quarter. They initially only did restoration in watches from before 1960, and their contracts initially came from the auction house until word spread. They restore and remake watch movements, making most of the watch parts themselves. They won a Design Innovation Award on a pendant they named Stella, which was based on a 1960s movement. It was housed in an orb of rock crystal suspended within a platinum gimbal. Struthers has spoken on Radio 4. In 2021 King Charles III presented Rebecca and Craig with the Heritage Crafts Association President's Award, including a £3,000 bursary. The two are using this to create a free educational watchmaking resource, Watchmakers' Café.

In May 2023 she released a book about the history of time, named Hands of Time. It was delayed by a year due to the COVID-19 pandemic, and has 288 pages and was published in June in the United States by Hodder & Stoughton. The book talks about the history of timekeeping devices, from Egyptian water clocks to the Apple Watch, and John Wilter, a name found on watch forgeries. Her husband illustrated the book. She finished her PhD thesis in 2017 and wanted to turn it into a book, but had difficulty finding a publisher interested in horology.

The Struthers made their own movement from scratch, named Project 248. They make around two or three tailor watches per year. One of their watches, the Kingsley Watch, sells for at least £48,000.

Struthers described her experience as a young female watchmaker as a hindrance at the start of her career. She said that later on in her career it "swung in the opposite way," saying that being a minority makes it easier to be noticed.

== Personal life ==
After graduating from university, Struthers and her now husband moved to London separately. In 2012 the two moved to Birmingham to set up shop, which was their house until 2022. Struthers married Craig in 2012. The two have a Staffie dog. She has tattoos, and is a fan of Casio watches.

== Publications ==
- Struthers, Rebecca (2023). Hands of Time: A Watchmaker's History. Hodder & Stoughton. ISBN 9781529339000.
