= Kaddish (Towering Inferno album) =

Studio album by Towering Inferno
- Released: 12 November 1993
- Recorded: 1991–1993
- Studio: Diorama, Camden Lock, and Porcupine, London; LGM, Budapest; mixed and mastered at Lavender Hill
- Genre: Experimental; industrial; electronic; modern classical
- Length: 73:45
- Label: TI, Island
- Producer: Towering Inferno

Kaddish is a 1993 concept album by English experimental music group Towering Inferno. It reflects on the Holocaust and includes East European folk singing, Rabbinical chants, klezmer fiddling, sampled voices (including Hitler's), heavy metal guitar and industrial synthesizer. Brian Eno described it as "the most frightening record I have ever heard". Kaddish was Towering Inferno's debut album. It was released on their own TI Records in 1993, and then globally by Island Records in 1995.

== Background ==
Towering Inferno was the duo of musicians Richard Wolfson and Andy Saunders. Wolfson was also a performance artist, cameraman and journalist, and had previously worked with Saunders in several groups. Wolfson and Saunders, both of European-Jewish descent, formed Towering Inferno in 1985 as an "ambient, techno and heavy metal" multimedia stage project that involved electronics and film. The duo toured Europe, augmenting their performances with slide and super 8 projectors. In 1986 they met Hungarian performance poet Endre Szkárosi in Italy at the Bologna Festival and were impressed by his cryptic works which challenged Communist dictatorship and explored European identity. Wolfson and Saunders decided to explore their own identities and spent the next five years on the road filming, performing and creating what became Kaddish, named for the Jewish prayer of the same name.

Roger Riley, a visual director who accompanied Wolfson and Saunders across Europe, said that "The long gestation of the project gave it a depth and richness it would not otherwise have had". They travelled thousands of miles, performing in Europe's underground circuit in venues as diverse as riding stables and slaughterhouses. These images, including those from a visit to the Dachau concentration camp, stimulated the creative process. Saunders said that they were also influenced by their experiences as children in synagogue, in particular sounds of the shofar, kaddish and the choirs. He said he found it unusual the other Jewish musicians like Bob Dylan, Lou Reed and Leonard Cohen tended to shy away from their "Jewishness" rather than embrace it.

Towering Inferno began performing Kaddish in the mid-1980s, and started recording it in 1991. The duo described the work, which included references to the history and folk-lore of Central and Eastern Europe and to the Shoah, as "a dream history of Europe in the wake of the Holocaust".

== Recording and release ==
Kaddish was composed and performed by Towering Inferno, with Hungarian folk-songs, which were adapted for the work, sung by Endre Szkárosi and Hungarian folk vocalist Márta Sebestyén. A number of guest musicians featured on the recording, including John Marshall and Elton Dean from Soft Machine, Chris Cutler and Tim Hodgkinson from Henry Cow, the five-piece Electra Strings, and the 100-piece London Welsh Chorale (Choral Cymry Llundain). The album was recorded by Gregg Skerman, a Swiss engineer who had accompanied the band through Europe as their sound mixer.

Recording began at London's Diorama in 1991. To take advantage of the venue's five- to six-second reverb, the drums and acoustic instruments were recorded in the middle of the dome with suspended Neumann KM84 microphones. Some drum-machine samples were also used, but these were played back in the Diorama and recorded as the other instruments had been. The use of multiple microphones allowed for the mixing of both close and distant sources, resulting in a sound which Saunders said "the best digital reverb in the world couldn't reproduce". Later, other instruments were also recorded in the Diorama. The choral segments, which had previously been taped with Kenneth Bowen, their conductor, were sampled, rearranged and played back in the dome to be recorded with the added reverb. Wolfson and Saunders also added into the mix samples of their own unrelated work that they had performed over the previous five years.

The Hungarian folk songs were recorded with Szkárosi and Sebestyén at the 3M Studios in Budapest with a Fostex 16-track recorder. Wolfson recalled that when they were taping Szkárosi reciting a poem of his over the London Welsh Chorale for "Sto Mondo Rotondo", a thunderstorm broke over the city, and they opened the studio doors to let in the sound of the storm. Wolfson said "It sounds like tape hiss, but it's actually rain in Budapest". While in Budapest Wolfson and Saunders interviewed Chief Rabbi Tamas Raj, who agreed to let them record him reciting the Kaddish. The prayer was recorded by Saunders on a Casio DA3 DAT, and he remarked that "it was spoken in the rare and beautiful Transylvanian dialect, and he graciously gave his permission for it to be used on the album".

Towering Inferno experimented constantly with the sound on the album's tracks to create the right atmosphere they wanted, and they tried a number of fuzz boxes on the guitars and other instruments. The metallic sound on "Reverse Field" was achieved by an Ibanez Roadstar guitar with a RAT distortion pedal fed through a Roland 301 Space Echo. The spoken/sung passages were also distorted, including Rabbi Raj's recitation of the Kaddish, and Szkárosi's poetry, where a Fuzz Face was used.

The album was mixed and mastered over a period of ten weeks at Lavender Hill Studios in London. It was mixed onto DAT, enabling a transfer to hard-disk for digital mastering. Crossfades and overlays were added before the final CD master was made. Recommended Records, an English independent record label owned and managed by Chris Cutler, released Kaddish on Towering Inferno's own TI Records in 1993. When Brian Eno heard the album he expressed his admiration for it, and this enabled Inferno's manager to sign a contract with Island Records, which released Kaddish globally in 1995.

== Performances ==
The first live performance of the album took place in July 1994 in Fribourg, Switzerland at the Belluard Bollwerk International Festival. Eight musicians performed the work, supplemented by keyboard-controlled samples and live DAT material. The 1995 global release of the album by Island Records came with a £80,000 budget, enabling Towering Inferno to add an 18-string orchestra and three large-screen projectors to their shows. This elevated their performances from the underground circuit to concert halls and opera houses around the world, including shows across Europe in Vienna, Berlin, Warsaw, Budapest and Moscow. In London Kaddish was performed at the Institute of Contemporary Arts on 1 October 1995, from where it was broadcast live on BBC Radio 3. The show ended its run in 1999 with three capacity performances at the Melbourne State Opera House.

These multimedia performances were well received by critics. While Szkárosi said that these big-budget shows "deepened the emotions and nuances of the piece", Saunders felt that it "squeezed much of the creativity from what had started as an underground event." Wolfson died in February 2005 at the age of 49 after work had begun on a second Towering Inferno album entitled The Other Side. Wolfson's tombstone is engraved with a line from Kaddish by Szkárosi: "This sky will cover you when you fall down".

== Reception ==
Professional ratings
Review scores
Source	Rating
AllMusic	4.5/5 stars
Alternative Press	5/5 stars
The Encyclopedia of Popular Music	4/5 stars

Mojo said Kaddish deploys a wide range of musical genres, and including minimalist ambient, metal, classical piano, string quartets and jazz, and called it "a sonic tapestry of thousands of years, lamenting what is lost in periods of great destruction." Brian Eno said Kaddish drew on a mix of influences "existing on the cusp of art and commerce, a cusp we did not know previously to exist". He believes "a piece of work should seduce you immediately, or should beat you over the head, which this one does. It's very immediate, there's no doubt it's affecting you when you're listening to it." Eno described Kaddish as "the most frightening record I have ever heard".

In a Richard Wolfson obituary, The Daily Telegraph said that Towering Inferno was "one of the most original and provocative performance-art bands of the 1990s", and described Kaddish as "a shocking and unforgettable piece". In another Wolfson obituary, The Guardian called the work "a complex and disturbing meditation on the Shoah that makes Steve Reich's Different Trains seem simplistic in comparison". Richie Unterberger writing in AllMusic said that Kaddish, which "reflects the horrors and wounds of the Holocaust with subtle (and largely wordless) complexity", is "not for everyone", but added that "[a]dventurous listeners will find much to chew on for repeated listenings". Sound on Sound said that Kaddish "not only satisfies on a musical level, but comes through with a sound of its own". Trouser Press wrote: "Such a violently engaging work, so heavily dependent upon visuals and the visceral impact of live amplitude to make its impact felt, would seem doomed if abstracted into a single dimension, yet the transformation from performance piece to record album is thoroughly successful".

== Track listing ==
All tracks composed by Richard Wolfson, Andy Saunders, Márta Sebestyén and Endre Szkárosi, except where noted.

Part I
No.	Title	Writer(s)	Length
1.	"The Rose"	Wolfson, Saunders, Sebestyén, Szkárosi, traditional	4:01
2.	"Prayer"		2:57
3.	"Dachau"		2:42
4.	"4 by 2"		2:44
5.	"Edvárd Király"		3:25
6.	"Memory"		4:42

Part II
No.	Title	Length
7.	"Not Me"	4:02
8.	"Reverse Field"	2:30
9.	"Occupation"	4:34
10.	"Sto Mondo Rotondo"	2:29
11.	"Organ Loop"	3:29

Part III
No.	Title	Length
12.	"Toll (I)"	0:55
13.	"Toll (II)"	3:41
14.	"The Run"	2:00
15.	"Juden"	0:51
16.	"Pogrom"	4:10
17.	"Partisans"	6:11

Part IV
No.	Title	Writer(s)	Length
18.	"Modern Times"		6:21
19.	"The Rose (II)"		3:36
20.	"The Bell"	Wolfson, Saunders, Sebestyén, Szkárosi, traditional	5:04
21.	"Kaddish"		3:10
22.	"The Weaver"	Wolfson, Saunders, Sebestyén, Szkárosi, traditional	1:06

== Personnel ==
- Richard Wolfson – composer, guitars, keyboards, programming, mandolin (track 9), bass guitar (track 18), drums and percussion (tracks 9, 20)
- Andy Saunders – composer, keyboards, programming, guitar (tracks 2, 21), soprano saxophone (tracks 3, 20), alto saxophone (track 7)
- Endre Szkárosi – texts, voice (tracks 1, 5 to 8, 10, 13, 17, 19)
- Márta Sebestyén – voice (tracks 1, 11, 19, 20)
- Rick Koster – violin (track 4)
- Aleksander Kolkowski – violin (tracks 5, 17)
- Elton Dean – saxophone (track 6)
- Tim Hodgkinson – baritone saxophone (track 7)
- Tim Roseman – trumpet (track 9)
- Glyn Perrin – piano (track 4)
- Steve Kellner – drums and percussion (tracks 5, 9, 13, 17, 18)
- John Marshall – drums and percussion (tracks 11, 17, 18)
- Chris Cutler – drums and percussion (tracks 17, 18)
- Gaspar Lawal – African percussion (tracks 13, 16)
- Anya Kubrick – soprano vocals (track 8)
- Choral Cymry Llundain – voice (tracks 10, 13, 17)
- Malcolm Miller – voice (tracks 1, 2, 13),
- David Pearl – voice (track 12)
- Rabbi Tamás Raj – voice (track 21)
- Electra Strings – (tracks 3, 17, 20)
  - Sonia Slany – first viola
  - Abigail Brown – second viola
  - Jocelyn Pook – viola
  - Dinah Beamish – cello
  - Andrew Davis – double bass
- Gregg Skerman – engineer
- Dave Bernez – editor, mastering
- Towering Inferno – mixer, producer
- Jon Crossland – design, layout
