= Heritage Crafts =

Charitable organisation in the UK

Heritage Crafts is a registered United Kingdom charity (registered as The Heritage Crafts Association) set up to support and promote traditional crafts. It has been operating under the name Heritage Crafts since October 2021.

The charity was launched at the Victoria & Albert Museum in March 2010, with a membership programme for supporters. Its founders included Robin Wood MBE (professional wood turner and co-founder of Spoonfest with Barn the Spoon), Patricia Lovett MBE (professional scribe, calligrapher and illuminator) and current executive director Daniel Carpenter.

Heritage Crafts initiated a 30-minute adjournment debate on the state of traditional crafts in the House of Commons in June 2009.

In May 2017, in association with The Radcliffe Trust, the Association published the Red List of Endangered Crafts, which was repeated again in 2019, 2021 and 2023, when it was funded by The Pilgrim Trust. This publication was also covered on Woman's Hour.

In 2020, the charity's patron, King Charles III (then Prince of Wales), launched The President's Award for Endangered Crafts, which was won in 2020 by Ernest Wright scissor makers, in 2021 by watchmaker Dr Rebecca Struthers and in 2022 by pargeter Johanna Welsh.

== Patron and ambassadors ==
The patron of Heritage Crafts is King Charles III, confirmed by the patronages review that followed the royal succession, in a continuation of the presidency role he had fulfilled as Prince of Wales since 2013.

Ambassadors include:

- Will Kirk – furniture restorer and television presenter
- Kaffe Fassett – textile designer
- Alex Langlands – archaeologist and star of Victorian Farm and Tales from the Green Valley
- Rose Sinclair MBE – lecturer in Design at Goldsmiths, University of London

== See also ==
- Crafts Council
