= Stepney City Farm =

City farm in London, England

Coordinates: 51.517155°N 0.043302°W

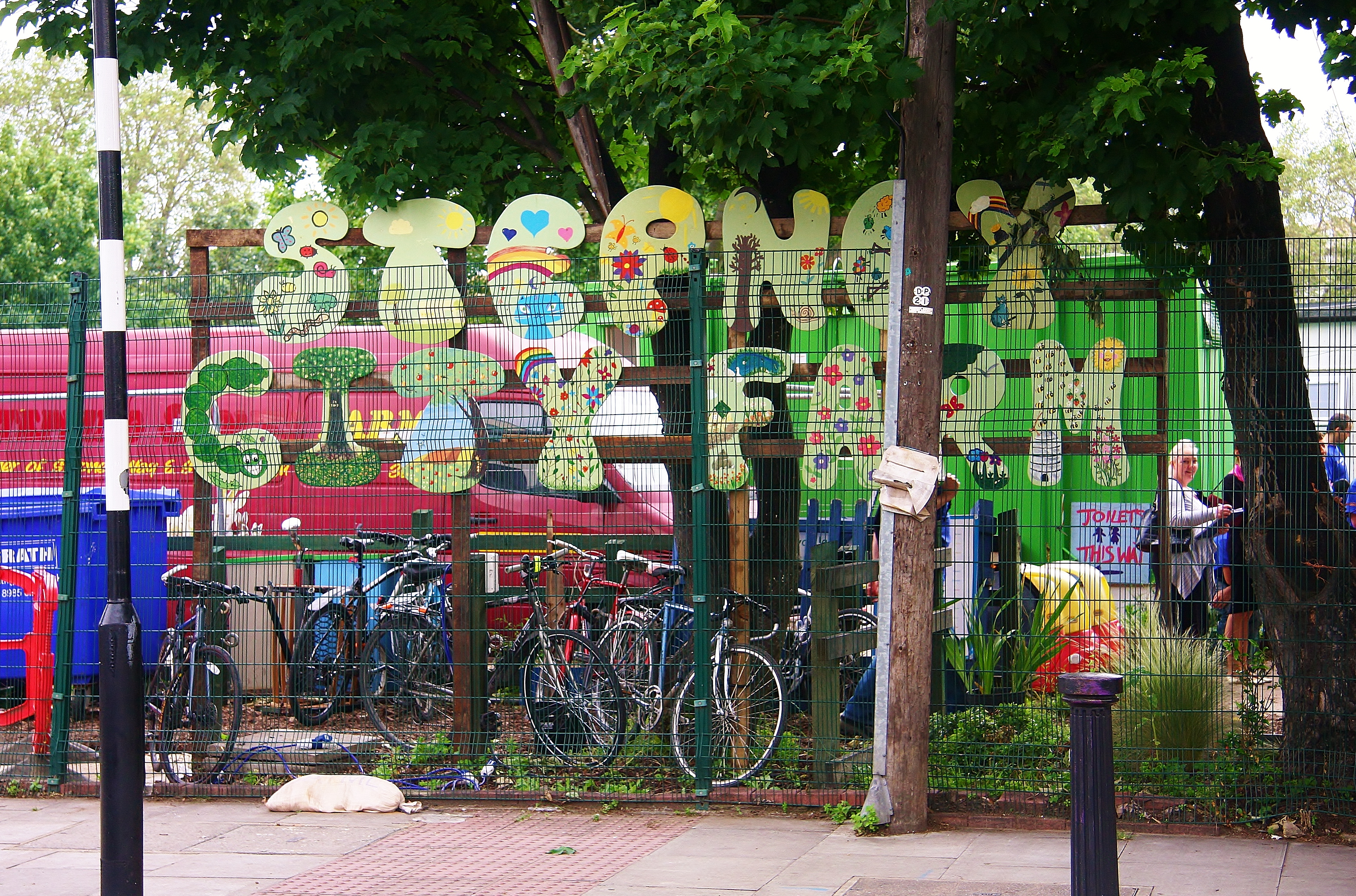
Stepney City Farm

Stepney City Farm is a city farm in Stepney, London, England. It is situated on Stepney Way with its entrance on the roundabout leading onto Stepney High Street and Belgrave Street towards Limehouse. The land is owned by Tower Hamlets Council through a trust, "The King George's Fields Trust" which is chaired by the Mayor of Tower Hamlets.

== History ==
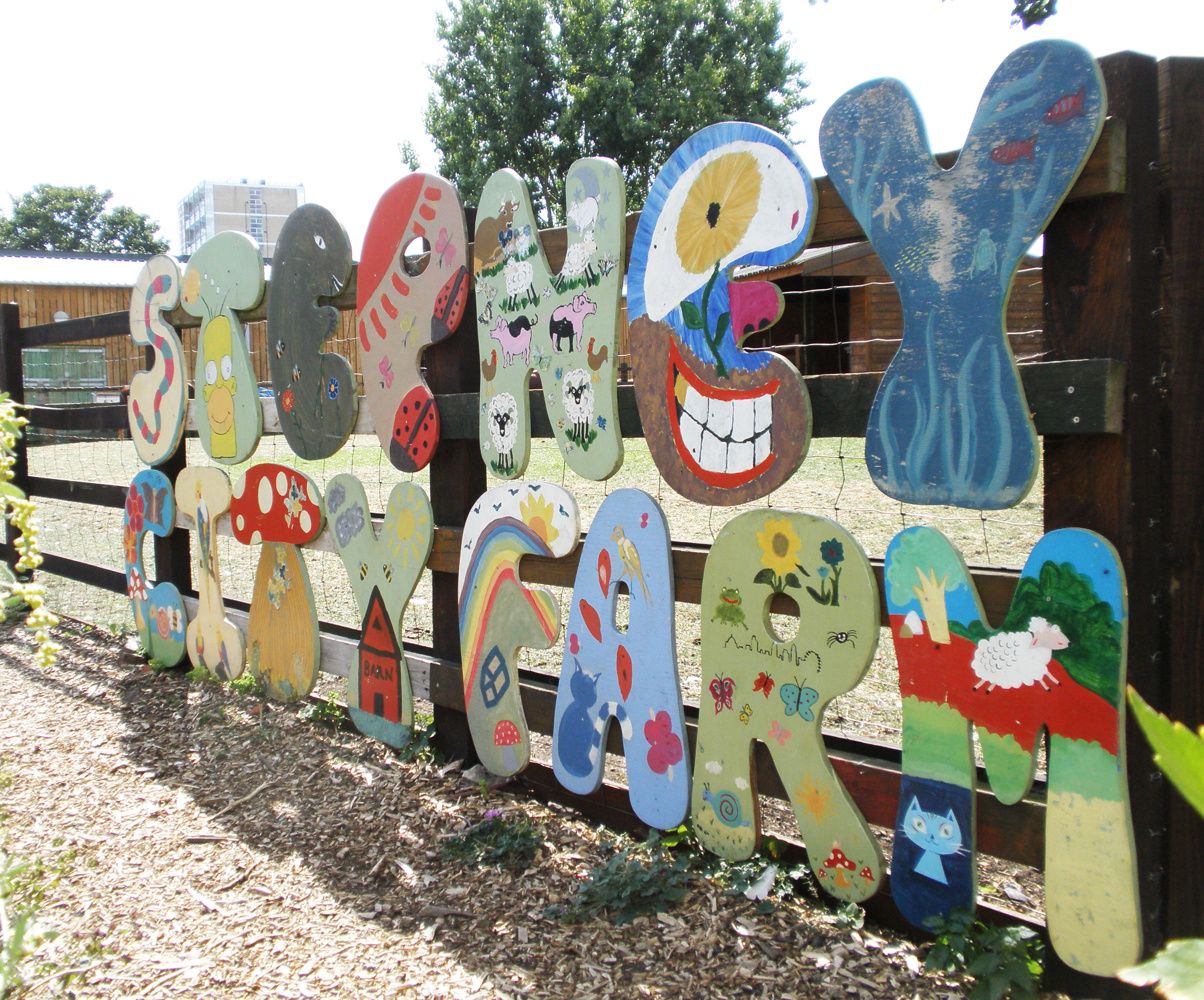
Sculpture at entrance

The farm was founded in 1979 by Lynne Bennett; at that time it was called Stepping Stones. Local residents, schools, churches and community groups were consulted and wasteland left after a World War II bomb destroyed the Stepney Congregational Church in 1941 was secured for the farm's use. The site has been through several incarnations since the 17th century. Worcester house (locally known as King John's Palace) was an original building from which ruins remain onsite, and the remains of the old Sunday school and the Stepney meeting house can be seen.

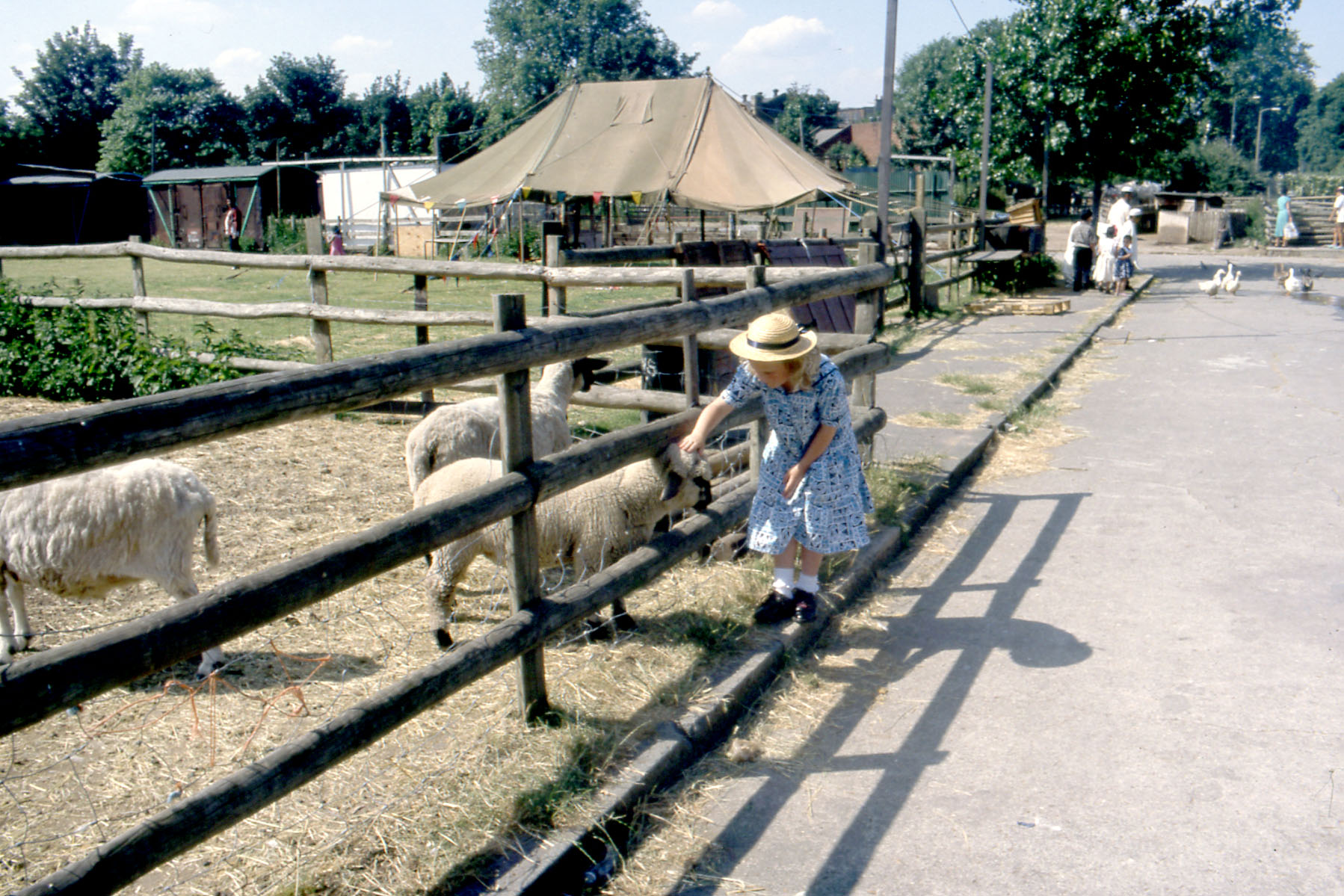
Sheep at Stepney City Farm (then Stepping Stones Farm)

Known as the Stepping Stones Farm up until 2009 under the management of Lynne Bennett, the 4.2-acre. From 2009 to 2012 the farm was technically the legal and financial responsibility of Tower Hamlets Council but is now run by a charity, "Stepney City Farm Ltd", with a 10-year lease as from 2012 (registered in June 2010 as Charity Number 1136448). The farm also runs workshops in rural crafts through its resident artisans; blacksmith, woodworker and potter. In 2011, the farm created an 800 square metre community garden and added low-cost growing boxes for community use.

In May 2013 a cafe and shop selling farm-reared meat and eggs as well as vegetables grown on-site was opened. It is open to the public six days a week. There is a Farmers' Market every Saturday. It is the home of The Green Wood Guild, a green wood and traditional woodworking craft workshop run by Barn the Spoon.

In January 2023, Stepney City Farm were one of the two city farms featured in the Lambeth Country Show edition of BBC One's afternoon programme The Farmers' Country Showdown.

== Crossrail ==
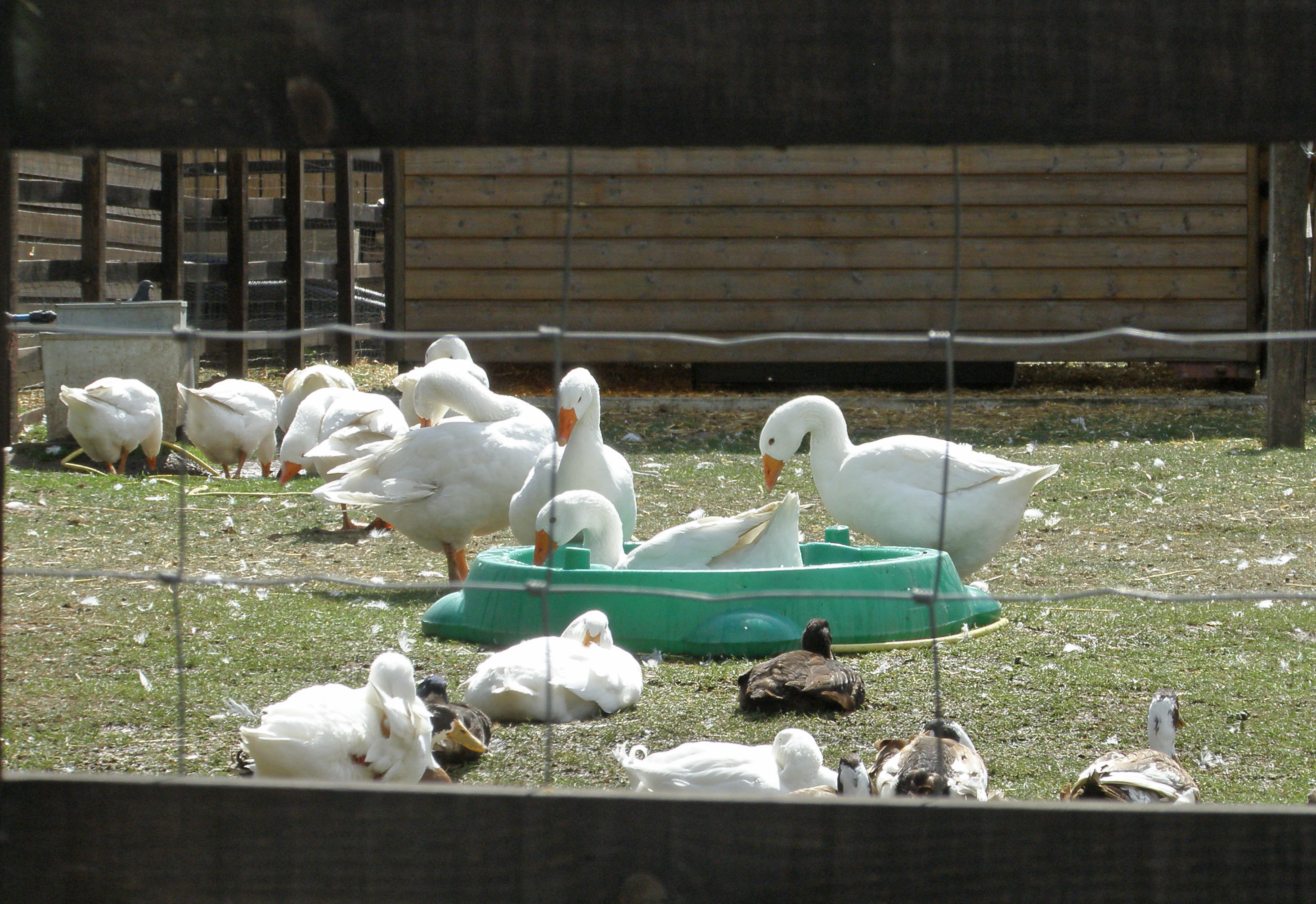
Geese

In 2010 Crossrail took over approximately a third of the Farm's site as part of the works to build a rail transport link connecting east and west London. This work was scheduled to end in 2018 with the land returned to the farm. In January 2011 Crossrail opened up an archaeological dig at the construction site on the farm. A ventilation shaft next door to the farm leads down to one of the largest mined caverns in Europe. In mitigation Crossrail worked closely with the farm to allow the existing animals to remain by making major improvements to the farm, especially the drainage of the fields and building a large barn for overwintering the animals and a rural arts building to house the farm's craftspeople. The farm officially opened these buildings on 8 September 2012.

== Lloyd and Leila ==
The farm's bull and cow Lloyd and Leila were featured in Strictly Come Dancing with Nancy Dell'Olio and Anton du Beke in 2011. In 2013 the cows' grazing field became unavailable as a result of Crossrail construction. The cows were offered a permanent home at Hillside Animal Sanctuary, but there was a problem with moving them there as they had not been registered properly at birth by the original charity, as has been a legal requirement by the British Cattle Movement Service for all cattle born in the UK since 1 July 1996. A campaign was started to get permission from the Department for Environment, Food and Rural Affairs (Defra) to grant an exemption to the usual cattle movement restrictions. The exemption was not granted despite the involvement of local Member of Parliament, Jim Fitzpatrick (former Minister for Defra), and the cows were culled in December 2013.
