= Richard Alan Cross =

British philosopher

Richard Alan Cross is Rev. John A. O'Brien Professor of Philosophy and former Chair of the Philosophy Department at the University of Notre Dame. Educated at Solihull School, Cross was formerly Professor of Medieval Theology at the University of Oxford and Tutor in Theology at Oriel College, Oxford, and holds a Master of Arts degree and a Doctor of Philosophy degree. His research interests lie in medieval theology and philosophy, especially Duns Scotus; Christology and the philosophy of religion.

Cross is married to Essaka Joshua, a graduate of Somerville College, Oxford and Birmingham University and a specialist in English literature of the Romantic period.

== Publications ==
- Christology and Metaphysics in the Seventeenth Century – 2022, Oxford University Press, Oxford.
- Communicatio Idiomatum: Reformation Christological Debates – 2019, Oxford University Press, Oxford.
- The Physics of Duns Scotus: The Scientific Context of a Theological Vision – 1998, Clarendon Press, Oxford. ISBN 0-19-826974-9
- Duns Scotus, Great Medieval Thinkers – 1999, Oxford University Press, Oxford. ISBN 0-19-512552-5
- Four-Dimensionalism and Identity Across Time: Henry of Ghent vs. Bonaventure – 1999, Journal of the History of Philosophy
- Incarnation, Indwelling and the Vision of God: Henry of Ghent and Some Franciscans – 1999, Franciscan Studies.
- Metaphysics of Incarnation: Thomas Aquinas to Duns Scotus – 2002, Oxford University Press. ISBN 0-19-924436-7
- Duns Scotus on God – 2004, Ashgate Publishing Group Ashgate. ISBN 0-7546-1402-6
