= Kismet (Márta Sebestyén album) =

Studio album by Márta Sebestyén
- Released: 1996
- Label: Hannibal
- Producer: Nikola Parov

Márta Sebestyén chronology
| Apocrypha (1992) | Kismet (1996) |

Kismet is an album by the Hungarian musician Márta Sebestyén, released in 1996. It is in the táncház musical tradition of Transylvania. Sebestyén supported the album with a North American tour.

== Production ==
The album was produced by Nikola Parov. It includes songs from outside of Sebestyén's Hungary, a first for the musician; on some songs, Sebestyén combined musical styles of different countries to illustrate their connections. Sebestyén sang in English on the majority of the album's songs.

== Critical reception ==
Professional ratings
Review scores
| Source | Rating |
|---|---|
| AllMusic | 4.5/5 stars |
| The Encyclopedia of Popular Music | 4/5 stars |
| MusicHound World: The Essential Album Guide | 3.5/5 stars |
| The Republican | 3.5/5 stars |

The Dallas Observer wrote that "this is music that has lived and died a thousand times, sounding so ancient and distant even when updated for the world-music crowd that likes its exotica pristine and slick." The Baltimore Sun called Kismet "a truly remarkable recording," writing that "the album draws not just from the Hungarian tradition, but also from the music of Ireland, India, Bosnia, Bulgaria, Romania, Greece and Tatarstan... It's a heady mix, but because Sebestyen so clearly understands the connections between these cultures, the melodic threads weave easily into a strong and lustrous fabric."

The Observer determined: "Entwining traditional and modern instruments and songs from Eire to India, this is an impeccable, at times transcendent fusion." The Republican noted the "exquisite soundscape of violins, flutes, acoustic guitars, mandola, tamboura and a host of other instruments." City Pages deemed the album "a mostly acoustic set of gorgeous internationalist folk."

AllMusic wrote that "this is world music fusion as an expression of culture, at the same time as it is an expression of the universality of some ideas and emotions."

== Track listing ==
| No. | Title | Length |
|---|---|---|
| 1. | "Devoiko Mome" |
| 2. | "Sino Moi" |
| 3. | "Leaving Derry Quay/Eleni" |
| 4. | "Gold, Silver or Love" |
| 5. | "Hindi Lullabye" |
| 6. | "The Shores of Loch Brann/Hazafelé" |
| 7. | "If I Were a Rose (Ha Én Rozsa Volnék)" |
| 8. | "Imam Sluzhba (The Conscript)" |
