= Patricia Lovett =

British scribe, calligrapher and illuminator

Patricia Lovett FRSA
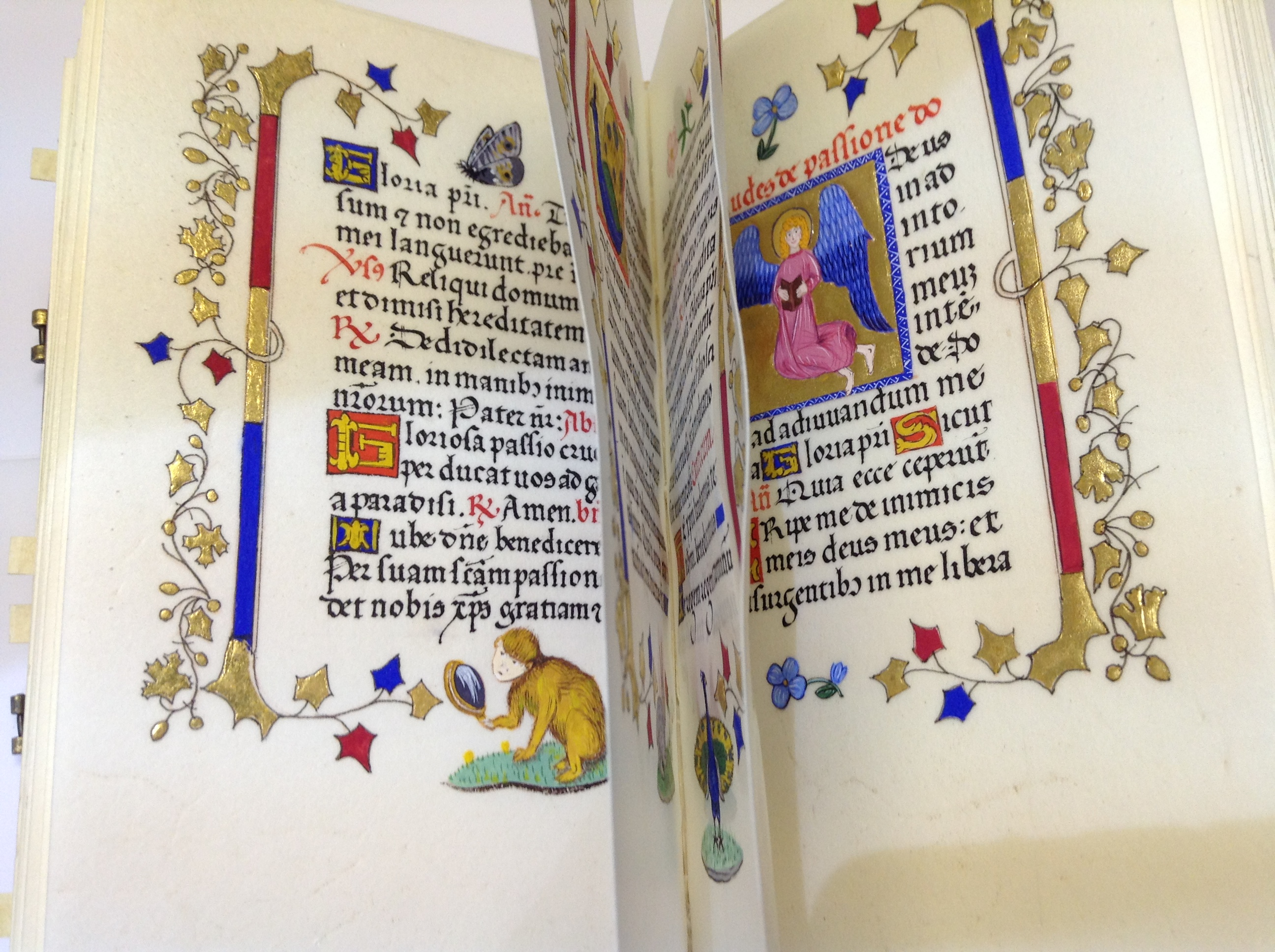
- Replica Book of Hours by Lovett
- Occupations: Illuminator, calligrapher, author
- Website: www.patricialovett.com

Patricia Lovett is a British scribe, calligrapher and illuminator from Kent. She is the author of many books on the subjects and teaches calligraphy, illumination and manuscript skills in the UK and worldwide. She was Chair of the Heritage Crafts Association between 2017 and 2022, having been Vice-Chair for several years previously and in 2013 was awarded an MBE for services to calligraphy and the protection of heritage crafts.

== Career ==
Lovett was a secondary school teacher in London before becoming interested in calligraphy and heraldry in the late 1980s.

She has a special interest in the manual preparation and uses of vellum. She teaches traditional vellum manuscript illumination, heraldry and calligraphy in Britain and in libraries around the world and is the author of many books across a range of manuscript skills.

Lovett is the co-founder of the Fitzwilliam Museum’s Collection of Contemporary Calligraphy at the University of Cambridge and curated the museum’s 2012/13 exhibition of contemporary calligraphy from around the world, Calligraphy Today.

She was the Chair of the Heritage Crafts Association, between 2017 and 2022, having previously been the founder Vice-chair. She is a final Judge for The President's Award (The King) of Heritage Crafts. She was a judge for the National Schools Handwriting Competition and champions handwriting along with other manual crafts.

She has also produced many commissioned works including pieces for Great Ormond Street Hospital for Sick Children, the Woodland Trust, Courtauld Institute of Art, British Academy Film Awards (BAFTAs) and Dulwich Picture Gallery. She has also worked in film and television providing tools and materials for Wolf Hall (BBC series) (a replica Book of Hours), Treasures of the Anglo-Saxons (BBC Radio 4) and the Simon Schama BBC series A History of Britain. She has taught Mark Rylance and Tom Bateman how to prepare and use a quill for film and theatre performances and has appeared in “Numerous instances of being filmed as ‘the hand’, writing documents, signing documents, ‘being’ poets or historical figures, drawing maps etc.” for film and television.

Lovett also works with the British Library providing short courses and study days on the traditional techniques of working with historical writing tools and vellum, illumination and gilding and medieval manuscripts. In addition she provided tools and materials and wrote the exhibition cards and introduction for the 2011/12 British Library exhibition Royal Manuscripts: The Genius of Illumination.She was filmed for six short films on how manuscripts were made for the British Library 'Anglo-Saxon Kingdoms' exhibition

She lives in Kent.

== Recognition ==
Lovett has held several honorary positions and fellowships for her work in the arts and heritage crafts. In 2013 she was awarded an MBE for services to calligraphy and the protection and promotion of heritage crafts in the UK.

Lovett was awarded Fellowship of City and Guilds Institute, is a Brother of the Art Workers' Guild and an honoured fellow of the Calligraphy and Lettering Arts Society (HFCLAS) having previously acted as chair. She is patron of the Lettering Arts Trust, a fellow of the Royal Society of Arts (FRSA), helped to set up, is an Associate member and provides the Secretariat for the All-Party Parliamentary Group for Craft , and is a participant in the All-party parliamentary group for art, craft and design education.

== Bibliography ==
Lovett has written several books and magazine articles including

- The Environment (Living Today series) (1982)
- Teach Yourself Calligraphy (TY Arts & Crafts) (1993, 10 editions)
- Creating Letterforms: Calligraphy and Lettering for Beginners (1992) with Rosemary Sassoon
- Calligraphy Projects (1994) Multiple authors
- Calligraphy for Starters (1995)
- Tools and materials for calligraphy, illumination and miniature painting (1996)
- Starting Lettering (1997) with Fiona M. Watt
- The British Library Companion to Calligraphy, Illumination and Heraldry: A History and Practical Guide (2000)
- The Macclesfield Alphabet Book: a facsimile (2010) with Christopher de Hamel
- Calligraphy Today (2012)
- The Historical Source Book for Scribes (2015) with Michelle P. Brown
- Illumination, gold and colour: tools, materials, techniques, projects for using gold and colour and creating mediaeval miniatures (2015)
- The Art and History of Calligraphy (2017)

'The Art of the Scribe' (2025)

== See also ==
- Illuminated manuscript
- Islamic calligraphy
- Palaeography
- Penmanship
