= Andy Dickens =

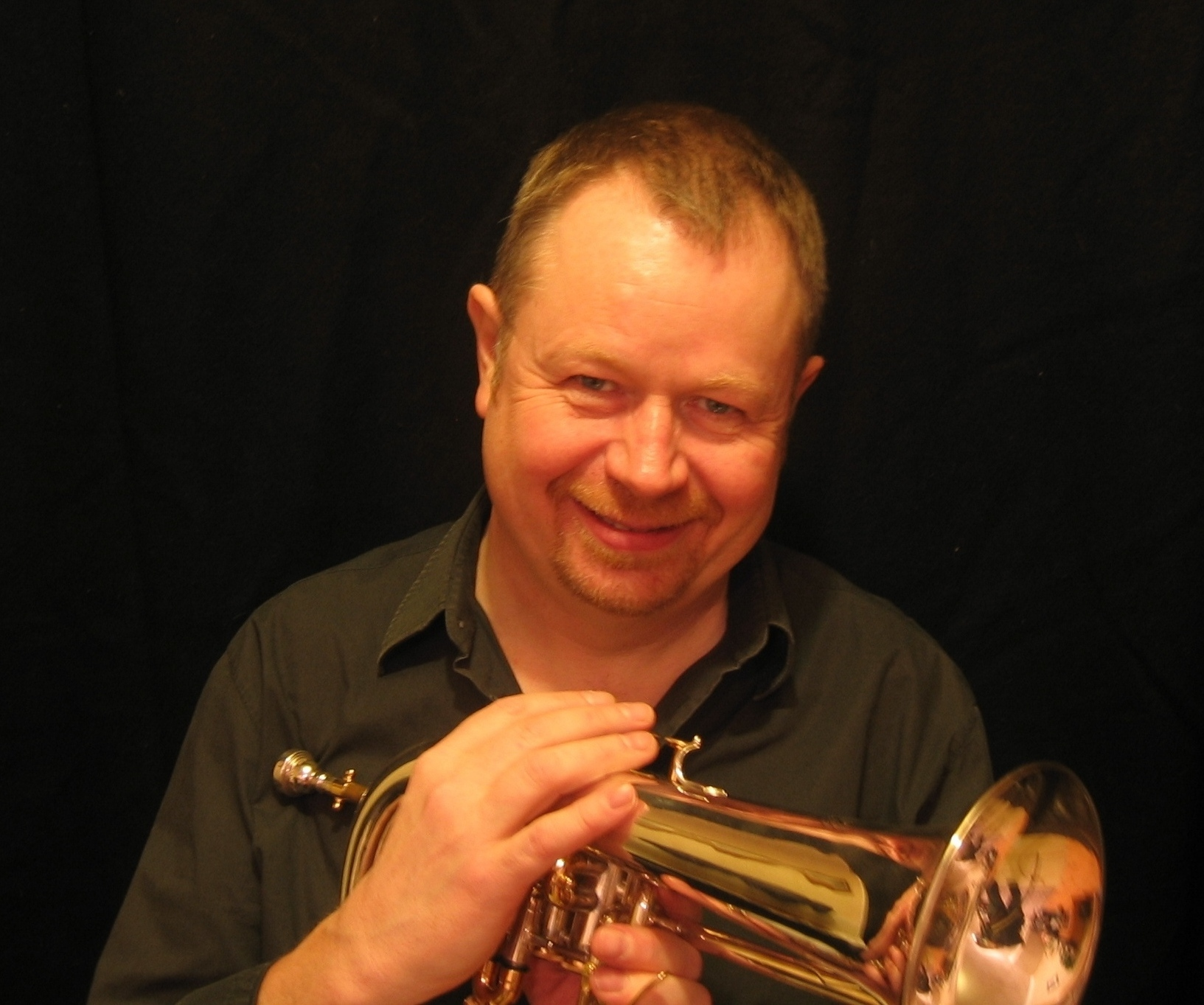
- Dickens in 2006.

Background information
- Born: 11 March 1953 (age 72)
- Origin: Birmingham, England
- Genres: Jazz, blues
- Instrument(s): Trumpet, flugel horn, vocals
- Years active: 1974–present
- Website: andydickens.com

Andy Dickens (born 11 March 1953) is an English jazz trumpeter, singer and bandleader.

Dickens was born in Birmingham, England, the son of a patent agent and headmistress. Educated at Solihull School he began playing trumpet at the age of 14. Largely self-taught, his style spans New Orleans jazz, swing and cool jazz but most typically evokes the pre-bop era of Roy Eldridge and Oran Page although his concert performances regularly combine works from the early jazz repertoire of gospel and blues with contemporary compositions.

He has performed with and accompanied Ken Peplowski, Peter King, Bruce Turner, Dick Morrissey, John Crocker, Slim Gaillard, Jools Holland, Neville Dickie; Kid Sheik, Clark Tracey as well as mainstream entertainers Jimmy Edwards and Judith Durham.

The current Andy Dickens Band is described by Jazz UK as exhibiting "creative music that shows there can be vivid new life in any style," and saxophonist Alan Barnes described the band in Musician Magazine as "swinging and eclectic."

== Sources and external links ==
- Jazz Journal International, January 2004 Volume 57 No1
- Musician Magazine, June 2003
- Andy Dickens website
