= Rosemary Sassoon =

British typographer and expert in children's handwriting (born 1931)

Rosemary Sassoon (born 1931 in the United Kingdom and currently residing in Busselton, Western Australia) is an expert in handwriting, particularly that of children. She designed the Sassoon series of typefaces, produced in collaboration with Adrian Williams, which are intended to be particularly legible for children and learners.

== Career ==
In 1988 she earned a PhD from the Department of Typography and Graphic Communication at the University of Reading in Berkshire, England. Sassoon's personal papers are held in the archives of University of London's Institute of Education.

Over her career she wrote a number of books on handwriting, and in particular on children's growth and development, and developed an approach to pedagogy in the field that was "considered as one of the best in the United Kingdom".

== Published works ==
- The Acquisition of a Second Writing System (Intellect) originally published in 1995, reprinted in 2004.
- The Art and Science of Handwriting (Intellect) originally published in 1993, reprinted in 2004.
- Computers and Typography 2 (Intellect) Bristol 2003
- Creating letterforms : calligraphy and lettering: an introductory guide (Thames & Hudson) with Patricia Lovett. 1992
- Handwriting of the Twentieth Century (Routledge)1999
- Handwriting: The Way to Teach it (Paul Chapman) 2003
- The Practical Guide to Calligraphy (Thames & Hudson) London 1982, reprinted in 2005
- Practical Guide to Children's Handwriting (Hodder & Stoughton) London 1983
- The Practical Guide to Lettering (Thames & Hudson) London 1986
- Signs Symbols and Icons (with Albertine Gaur) (Intellect) Bristol 1995
- Teach Yourself Better Handwriting (Hodder & Stoughton) 2009

== List of Sassoon fonts ==
Sassoon Primary font family sample

- Sassoon Primary Infant
- Sassoon Primary Infant Medium
- Sassoon Primary Infant Bold
- Sassoon Primary Type
- Sassoon Primary Type Medium
- Sassoon Primary Type Bold
- Sassoon Sans
- Sassoon Sans Medium
- Sassoon Sans Bold
- Sassoon Type Sans
- Sassoon Type Sans Medium
- Sassoon Type Sans Bold
- Sassoon Italic Regular
- Sassoon Italic Medium
- Sassoon Primary Type Medium Condensed
- Sassoon Penned
- Sassoon Penned Medium
- Sassoon Penned Bold
