= John Wilter =

John Wilter was an 18th-century watchmaker who had his name used fictitiously on Dutch forgeries of English watches. The majority of the watches bearing his name are Dutch forgeries, but there are higher quality ones that he made himself. The Dutch forgeries undercut competitors from London by about 50%. Some have spelling mistakes such as 'John Vilter'. The British Museum lists his activity dates as between 1760 and 1784.

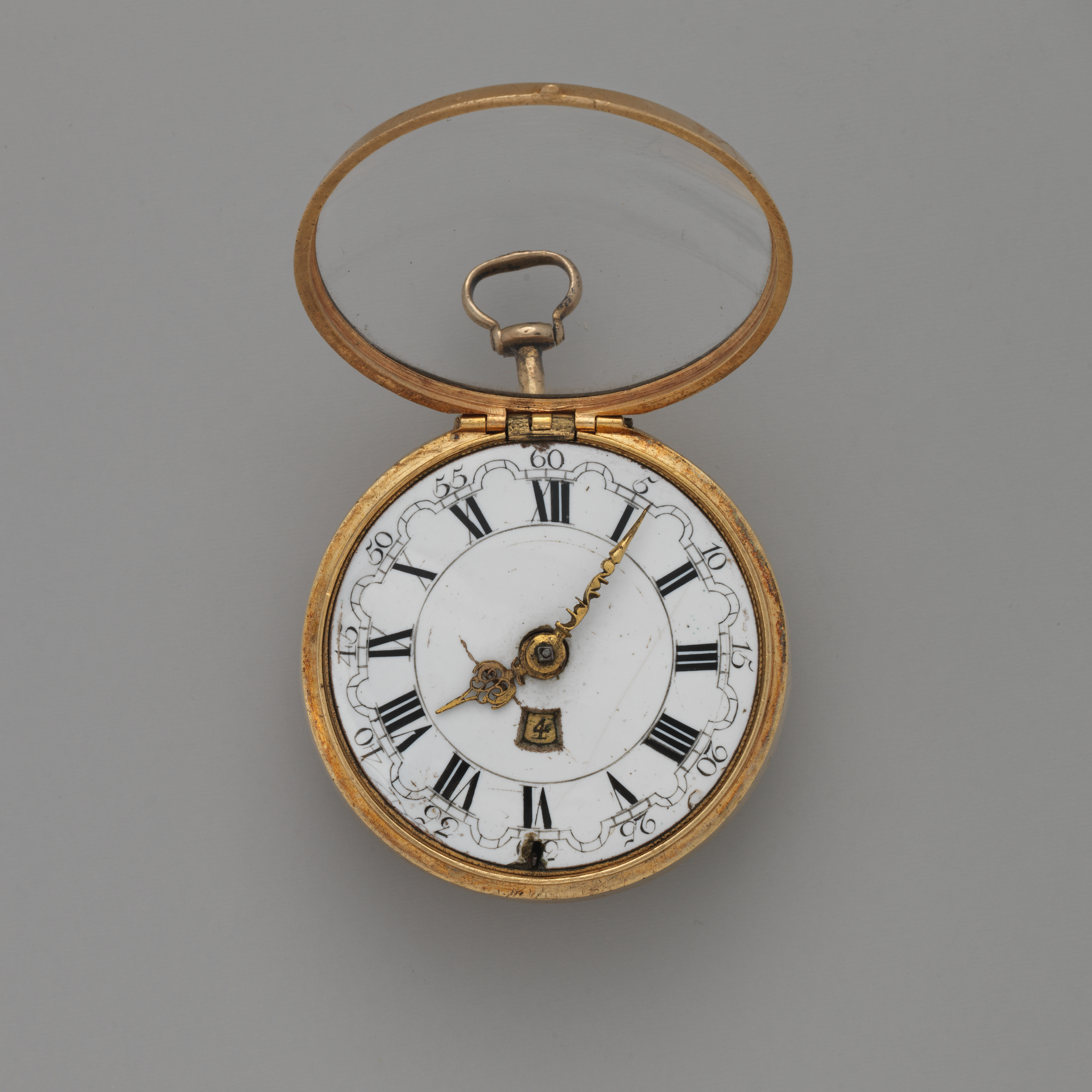
Watch created by 'John Wilter'

The Metropolitan Museum of Art has 2 watches with the name 'John Wilter'.

== Investigation ==
After finding a watch labelled 'John Wilter, London' which had characteristics that it made it appear both as an English and Dutch watch, Rebecca Struthers looked his name up in a book, Loomes' Watchmakers and Clockmakers of the World, which listed Wilter as "perhaps a fictitious name".

In an 1817 hearing in House of Commons, a watchmaker named Henry Clarke spoke of Wilter:

[He] introduced the making of watched with the feigned name of 'Wilters, London' on them; those watches were well made, and would have done credit to the maker, who should have put his name upon them; other persons speedily imitated the external appearance of the watches ... [but] those had sham day of the month, dials and hands without and wheels to move them, and also than sham appearance of having being jewelled in the pivot holes ... The last I saw of those spurious watches were offered to me for sale at 43s. each, but really were good for nothing; whereas the first introducer of watches, with that feigned name, was not overpaid at eight guineas each.

This caused Struthers to realise that John Wilter was simultaneously real and fictitious. Struthers suggested that the name was created by a Dutch merchant that wanted a forgery to sound as if it was made in England. She suggested that the merchant originally commissioned John Wilter, but realised that creating forgeries elsewhere in Europe with his John Wilter's name would yield him higher profits.
