= Stevie Parle =

British chef

Stephen Parle
- Born: 1985 (age 40–41); Birmingham, England
- Education: Solihull School; Ballymaloe Cookery School
- Occupation: Chef
- Known for: Dock Kitchen
- Culinary career
- Current restaurant: Dock Kitchen
- Award won: The Guardian Young Chef of the Year (2010)

Stephen "Stevie" Parle (born Birmingham, England, 1985) is a British chef.

Parle studied at Solihull School, Darina Allen's cookery school, Ballymaloe and then went on to work at River Café, Moro, and Petersham Nurseries. He spent 2008–2009 on his 'Moveable Kitchen' project, in which he set himself up in various locations around London, cooking menus based on his travels, the seasons, and famous food writers. Parle opened his own restaurant Dock Kitchen, above Tom Dixon's showroom in Portobello Dock, Ladbroke Grove in 2009.

Describing his culinary direction Emma Grazette said: "[we] are really anti fine dining and all those newfangled ways of cooking, and really into how your gran might cook: rustic and full of flavour."

Parle has written three books on cooking. His first book, My Kitchen: Real Food From Near and Far was published by Quadrille in 2010 and was shortlisted for an Andre Simon Award and a Guild of Food Writers Award. His second book, Real Home Cooking from Around The World was published in 2012. His third book, Spice Trip: The Simple Way to Make Food Exciting, with Emma Grazette was published in October 2012, to accompany the More 4 and Channel 4 series, which was screened in December 2012.

Parle writes a weekly food column in the Saturday Telegraph Weekend section. In 2010, he was named The Guardian Young Chef of the Year.
