= James Barralet =

British musician

James Barralet is a British cellist. Barralet started playing the cello at the age of five. He has performed extensively throughout the UK and Europeas a concerto soloist with many orchestras and as a recitalist at numerous festivals including the Newbury Spring Festival, the Ryedale Festival, Warwick International Festival, Stratford-Upon-Avon Chamber Music Series, Brighton Festival and the Northern Aldborough Festival. He is also known for his collaboration with Indian music artists, and as a chamber musician. He is the cellist of the Leondari Ensemble and the Werther Ensemble and a guest principal cellist with many UK orchestras. Barralet also composes and arranges music, mainly for cello ensembles. Barralet is also the founder and artistic director of the Whittington International Chamber Music Festival.

== Early life and education ==
Educated at Solihull School, Barralet started playing the cello at the age of five, studying with Hannah Roberts at the Royal Northern College of Music and Thomas Demenga in Basel Hochschule für Musik where he was awarded the Soloists Diploma. He complemented his studies by taking master classes with Steven Isserlis, Ralph Kirshbaum, Boris Pergamenschikow, Miklós Perényi at the International Musicians Seminar Prussia Cove.

Barralet was awarded the Royal Philharmonic Society Julius Isserlis Scholarship in 2003 to fully support two years study abroad and won the Landor Records Competition in 2007. His other awards include the Muriel Taylor Cello Scholarship, a Hattori Foundation Scholarship, Musicians' Benevolent Fund awards and several others.

== Career ==
James Barralet has performed extensively throughout the UK and Europe, as a concerto soloist with many orchestras, and as a recitalist at numerous festivals including the Newbury Spring Festival, the Ryedale Festival, Warwick International Festival, Stratford-Upon-Avon Chamber Music Series, Brighton Festival and the Northern Aldborough Festival.

He is also known for his collaboration with Indian music artists, and as a chamber musician is the cellist of the Leondari Ensemble and the Werther Ensemble. Barralet also serves as guest principal cellist with many UK orchestras.

As an advocate of contemporary music, he has made premiere recordings of the 1971 first movement of Benjamin Britten's Third Cello Suite, and of Edwin Roxburgh's Partita. He performed the Partita alongside Kenneth Hesketh's Die Hängende Figur ist Judas at the Purcell Room in a Park Lane Group concert in 2008, and the following year, he performed Zoltán Kodály's Sonata for Solo Cello and György Ligeti's Sonata for Solo Cello at his Wigmore Hall debut recital.

In addition to performing, Barralet also composes and arranges music, mainly for cello ensembles. He has received several commissions, notably from the Beijing Music Festival, the Royal Academy of Music, Cello 8ctet Amsterdam, SOMM Records and Stomp Music Korea.

Barralet records for Landor Records UK and SOMM Records. His debut recording, a solo cello disc of works by Kodály, Roxburgh and Britten, was released in October 2009. A Brahms cello and piano recording was released on the SOMM label in 2013.

Barralet is artistic director of the Whittington International Chamber Music Festival, which he founded in 2013.

As a member of Wigmore Hall's Ignite Ensemble, he is strongly involved in improvisation, education and outreach.

== Discography ==
- James Barralet: Solo Cello – Sonata for Solo Cello by Zoltán Kodály, Suite for Solo Cello No. 3 by Benjamin Britten with a premier recording of the 1971 first movement, Partita for Solo Cello by Edwin Roxburgh premier recording (Landor Records 2009)
- "Vivat Brahms!" – Sonata No. 1 for Cello and Piano, 21 Hungarian Dances arr. for cello by Barralet – with Simon Callaghan, piano (SOMM Records 2013)
- "Vivat Brahms! part 2" – Sonata No. 2 for Cello and Piano, Two Songs op. 91, Piano Trio in C – with Simon Callaghan pno, Anna-Liisa Bezrodny vln, Hannah Strijbos vla (SOMM Records 2014)

== Bibliography ==
- Anna Picard (13 January 2008). "Park Lane Group, The Purcell Room Review". The Independent.
- Andrew Palmer (2008). "James Barralet is Bridging the Cultural Divide". All Things Strings magazine.
- (2008) "One To Watch – James Barralet". Gramophone magazine.
- Kenneth Carter (19 January 2009) "Wigmore Hall Concert Review". Classical Source.
- Peter Grahame Woolf (19 January 2009) "Wigmore Hall Concert Review". Musical Pointers.
- Roger Jones (25 May 2009) "Tchaikovsky Rococo Variations at the Cheltenham Pitville Pump Rooms Review". Gloucester Echo.
