= Richard Wolfson (musician) =

British musician, performance artist, cameraman and journalist

- Born: 25 April 1955; Solihull, United Kingdom
- Died: 1 February 2005 (aged 49)
- Education: Solihull School
- Occupations: Musician, Performance artist, Cameraman, Journalist
- Known for: Kaddish concept album

Richard Wolfson (25 April 1955 – 1 February 2005) was a British musician, performance artist, cameraman, and journalist. He is best known for his work on the concept album Kaddish created with Andy Saunders using the band name Towering Inferno.

== Early life ==
Wolfson was born to an orthodox Jewish family in Solihull, United Kingdom, and was educated at Solihull School. In his early years, he learned piano and guitar.

== Music career ==
At the age of 14, Wolfson formed Solstice, a folk band with Mark Chapman, heavily influenced by the work of the Incredible String Band. At 17, he formed the first of a succession of bands with Andy Saunders. Towering Inferno was conceived as a large-scale multimedia stage project, involving film and electronics. Wolfson and Saunders were impressed by the Hungarian poet Endre Szkárosi, and his cryptic poetry was a stimulus for their major work, the stage show and album Kaddish.

=== Kaddish concept album ===
Kaddish was created over five years and is an extended reflection on the Jewish prayer of the same name, including references to the history and folklore of Central and Eastern Europe and to the Shoah (Holocaust). The music includes adaptations of Hungarian folk-songs, some of them sung by Márta Sebestyén and Szkárosi, Jewish chant, and the sound of the shofar, along with dramatic electronic sound-effects. The album was originally released in 1993 and received critical acclaim. Brian Eno called it 'the most frightening record I have ever heard'.

== Journalism career ==
In addition to his work in music and performance art, Wolfson had a successful career as a journalist, writing on music and film for publications such as the Daily Telegraph and the Financial Times.

== Death ==
Richard Wolfson died from an aortic aneurysm on 1 February 2005.

== Discography ==
- Kaddish by Towering Inferno, released by Island Records (1993).
