= Towering Inferno (band) =

English experimental music duo

- Origin: England
- Genres: Experimental, industrial, electronic, modern classical
- Years active: 1985–1999
- Labels: TI, Island
- Past members: Richard Wolfson; Andy Saunders

Towering Inferno were an English experimental music duo of Richard Wolfson and Andy Saunders, notable for their sole album Kaddish, which reflected on The Holocaust. Kaddish was released on their own TI Records in 1993, and then globally by Island Records in 1995. Wolfson and Saunders composed the music, and Hungarian performance poet Endre Szkárosi contributed the lyrics.

Towering Inferno performed Kaddish in a number of cities between 1994 and 1999, including Vienna, Berlin, Warsaw, Budapest, Moscow and Melbourne. A London performance of the work in 1995 was broadcast live on BBC Radio 3. The Daily Telegraph said that Towering Inferno was "one of the most original and provocative performance-art bands of the 1990s", and described Kaddish as "a shocking and unforgettable piece".

In 1997, they contributed a cover of "Metal" to the Gary Numan tribute album Random.

Wolfson died in February 2005, but Saunders, with Chris Cutler, Jah Wobble, Bob Drake, Dave Kerman, Glyn Perrin, Greg Skerman and others, began working on a second Towering Inferno album that had been started before Wolfson's death. The Himmel project began at a 2010 memorial concert for Wolfson, based around Saunders' compositions. A 22:50 piece entitled "HIMMEL", recorded at a 2014 concert with Saunders, Cutler and others, was released on Cutler's CC 100 in Japan in 2015, which was later incorporated into his Compositions and Collaborations 1972-2022 boxset (2023).

== Discography ==
- Kaddish (1993, CD, Island Records)
