= Bogyiszló =

Village in Tolna County in Hungary

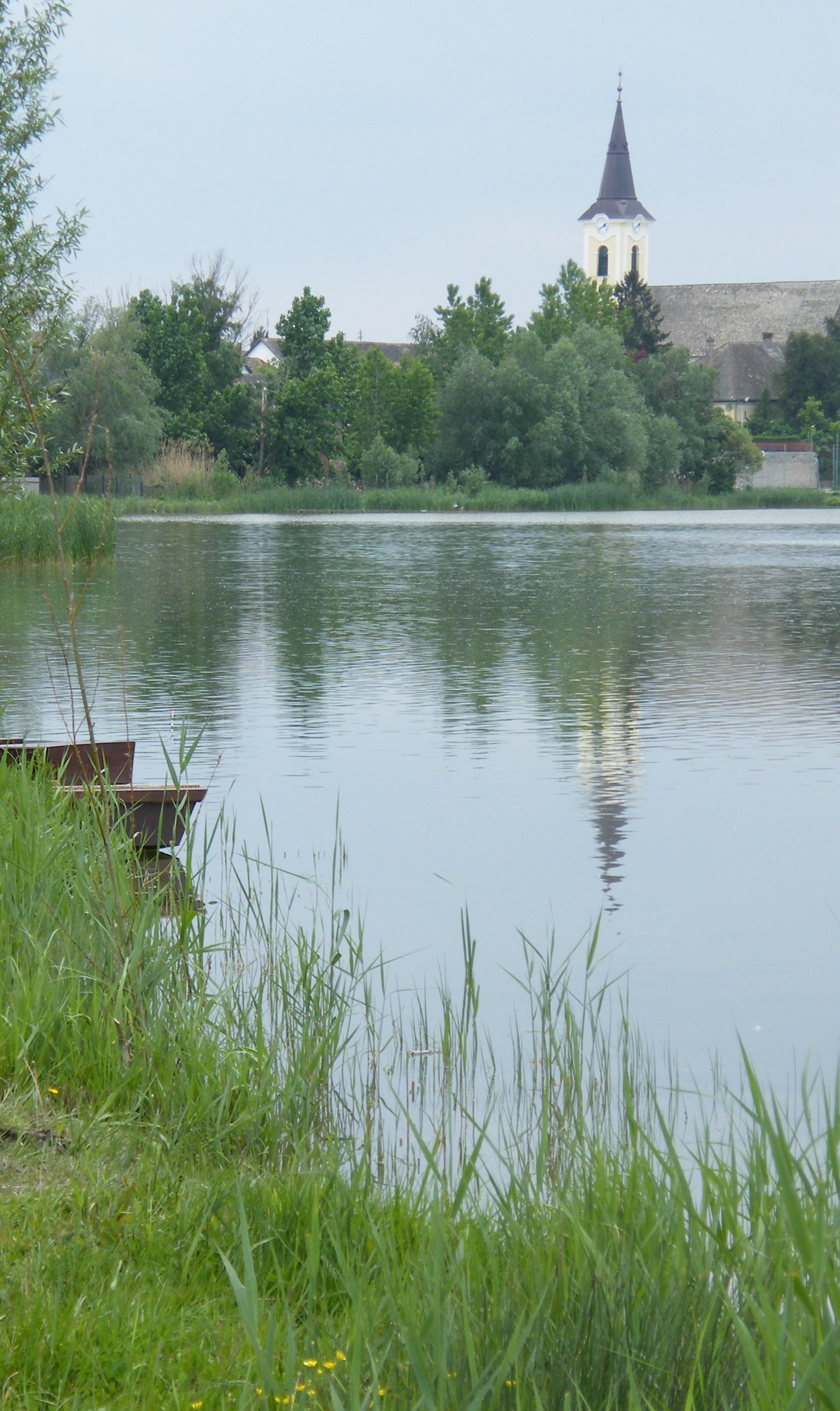

- Coat of arms

- Location of Bogyiszló
- Coordinates: 46.38580°N 18.83115°E
- Country: Hungary
- County: Tolna

Government
  - Mayor: Tóth István (Fidesz-KDNP)

Area
  - Total: 55.93 km^{2} (21.59 sq mi)

Population (2022)
  - Total: 1,988
  - Density: 35.54/km^{2} (92.06/sq mi)
- Time zone: UTC+1 (CET)
  - Summer (DST): UTC+2 (CEST)
- Postal code: 7132
- Area code: 74
- Website: www.bogyiszlo.hu

Bogyiszló is a village in Tolna County in Hungary. The village is famous for its hot, white-skinned peppers.

== Geography ==
Bogyiszló is located from 11 km east from Szekszárd, in the southern part of Mezőföld, near the Danube river and Sió channel mouth. Approach: from road number 6 from west-direction, or from road number 51 from east-direction, on M9 highway, across the Danube on bridge named after Ladislaus I of Hungary.

== History ==
Based on archaeological finds, Bogyiszló has already been populated area in the ages of Avars.

== Twin towns – sister cities ==
- Schlitz, Germany

== Economy ==
Bogyiszló is an agricultural village. It is known for the Bogyiszló white-skinned pepper. With the eradication of the forest that once covered the floodplain, the area was found to be ideal for growing both sweet, and hot varieties of pepper, as well as the red peppers used in making paprika. The area is also noted for its forestry, fishing, and hunting traditions.

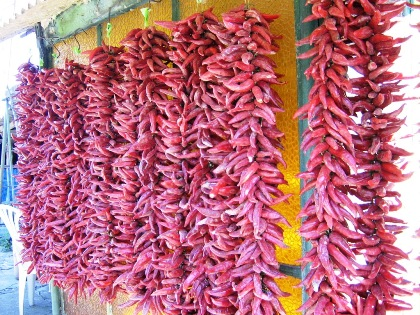
Paprika garlands

== See also ==
- Bogyiszló orchestra
