= László Lajtha =

Hungarian musician

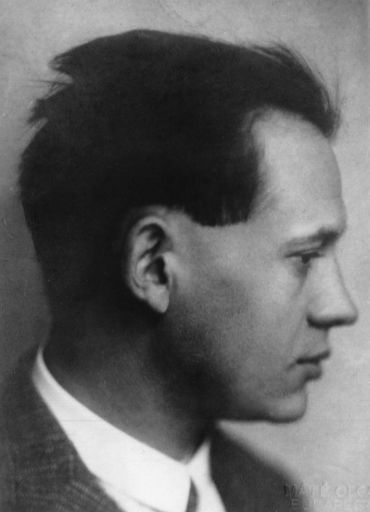
László Lajtha

László Lajtha (Hungarian pronunciation: [ˈlaːsloː ˈlɒjtɒ]; 30 June 1892 – 16 February 1963) was a Hungarian composer, ethnomusicologist and conductor.

== Career ==
Lajtha was born to Ida Wiesel, a Transylvanian-Hungarian and Pál Lajtha, an owner of a leather factory. His father had ambitions to become a conductor, played the violin well and also composed. Lajtha studied with Viktor Herzfeld in the Academy of Music in Budapest and then in Leipzig, Geneva and finally Paris where he was a pupil of Vincent d'Indy. Before the First World War, in collaboration with Béla Bartók and Zoltán Kodály, he undertook the study and transcription of Hungarian folk song, heading up a project to produce a series of folk music recordings. Throughout the war he served at the front as an artillery officer, an experience recalled in his sombre Second Symphony (1938) – a work that remained unperformed until 1988. In 1919 he married Róza Hollós, and began teaching at the Budapest National Conservatory. Among his pupils was the conductor János Ferencsik, who was later one of the principal champions of his music. From 1928 he was a member of the International Commission of Popular Arts and Traditions of the League of Nations. He was also a member of the International Folk Music Council based in London.

After the Second World War, Lajtha was appointed Director of Music for Hungarian Radio, director of the Museum of Ethnography and of the Budapest National Conservatory. His symphonic piece In Memoriam was the first new work to be premiered in Budapest when concerts could be given there again. In 1947–48 Lajtha spent a year in London, having been asked by the film director George Hoellering to compose music for his film of T. S. Eliot's verse drama Murder in the Cathedral. Rather than providing a dedicated film score, Lajtha wrote three important concert works – his Third Symphony, Orchestral Variations and Harp Quintet No. 2 – extracts from which were used in the film. On his return to Hungary his passport was confiscated for having stayed too long in the West and he was removed from all the aforementioned posts. In 1951 he was awarded the Kossuth Prize for his activities in folk-music research.

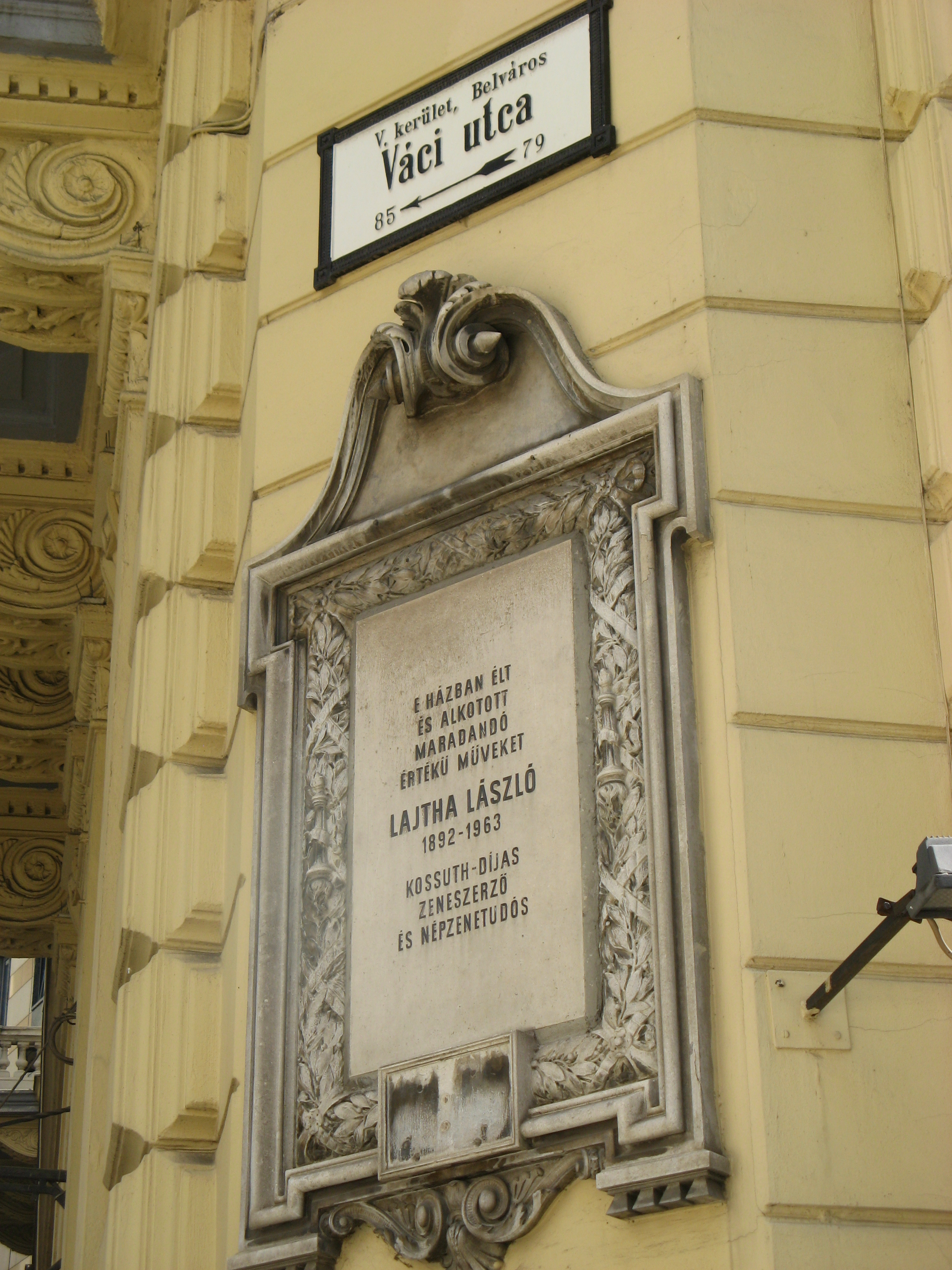
A commemorative plaque marks the home of Lajtha László on Váci Utca (street) in central Budapest, where he lived and worked between 1923 and 1963.

Between 1923 and 1963, Lajtha lived at 79 Váci Utca (street) in the Inner City of Budapest, where a commemorative plaque has been placed. With his wife Rózsa Hollós he had two sons: László Lajtha (d. 1995) who was a world-renowned cancer researcher and Ábel Lajtha who is an internationally renowned neurologist and brain researcher living in the US.

== Reputation ==
Lajtha's international recognition as a composer began in 1929 with his String Quartet No. 3, which was awarded the Coolidge Prize. From his time in Paris before the First World War Lajtha had many friends among French artists, such as the novelist Romain Rolland and the composer Henri Barraud, and from 1930 he had some of his works published by the Paris publisher Alphonse Leduc. He was the only Hungarian composer since Franz Liszt to be elected a corresponding member of the French Académie des Beaux-Arts. His works display an intriguing synthesis of French and Hungarian national elements with musical neo-classicism, very clearly seen for example in his Fourth Symphony (1951), entitled Le Printemps. His later works are more radical in their construction and employ some extreme dissonance, for example the Seventh Symphony, Autumn (1957), conceived as a lament for the 1956 uprising.

Awareness of his music has however suffered, both in Hungary and abroad, as a result of its suppression under the Communist regime due to his support for the 1956 uprising. In addition a ban on Lajtha travelling abroad denied him performance opportunities, and it is only in recent years that his reputation has begun to be established as one of Hungary's most important composers.

== Selected list of works ==
=== Piano ===
- Egy muzsikus írásaiból (Writings of a Musician), 9 fantasies op. 1 (1913)
- Contes
- 11 pieces op. 2 (dedicated to Béla Bartók, 1914)
- Sonata op. 3 (1914)
- Prelude (1918)
- 6 pieces op. 14 (1930)
- Erdélyi induló (Transylvanian March) (1945)
- 3 berceuses (for piano with or without voice, 1957)

=== Chamber music ===
==== String quartets ====
- no. 1 Double fugue and rondo op. 5 (1923)
- no. 2 op. 7 (1926)
- no. 3 Játékország op. 11 (1929)
- no. 4 op. 12 (1930)
- no. 5 5 études op. 20 (1934)
- no. 6 4 études op. 36 (1942)
- no. 7 op. 49 (1950)
- no. 8 op. 53 (1951)
- no. 9 op. 57 (1953)
- no. 10 Suite transylvaine in 3 parts op. 58 (1953)

==== Other ====
- Piano quintet op. 4 (1922)
- Piano quartet op. 6 (1925)
- String trio (no. 1) Serenade op. 9 (1927)
- Trio concertante with piano op. 10 (1928)
- Sonate for violoncelle et piano op. 17 (1932)
- String trio no. 2 op. 18 (dedicated to Romain Rolland, 1932)
- Trio for flute, cello and harp op. 22 (1935)
- Marionnettes, suite of 4 pieces for flute, violin, viola, cello and harp op. 26 (1937)
- Sonata for violin and piano op. 28 (reportedly lost, 1938)
- Concert (sonate) for cello and piano op. 31 (dedicated to André Navarra, interpreter of several of his chamber works, 1940)
- Serenade for 3 wind instruments op. 40 (reportedly lost, 1944)
- String trio no. 3 Soirs transylvains, 4 sketches op. 41 (1945)
- 4 hommages for flute, oboe, clarinet and bassoon op. 42 (1946)
- Quintet no. 2 for flute, violin, viola, cello and harp op. 46 (1948)
- Trio no. 2 for flute, cello and harp op. 47 (1949)
- Intermezzo for alto saxophone and piano op. 59 (1954)
- Concert sonata for flute and piano op. 64 (1958)
- 3 pieces for solo flute op. 69 (1958)
- Concert sonata for violin and piano op. 68 (1962)

=== Orchestral works ===
==== Symphonies ====
- no. 1 op. 24 (1936)
- no. 2 op. 27 (1938)
- no. 3 op. 45a (from the film Murder in the Cathedral, 1948)
- no. 4 Le Printemps op. 52 (1951)
- no. 5 op. 55 (dedicated to Henry Barraud, 1952)
- no. 6 op. 61 (1955)
- no. 7 Révolution op. 63 (1957) (also called Autumn)
- no. 8 op. 66 (1959)
- no. 9 op. 67 (1961)

==== Ballets ====
- Lysistrata op. 19a, from the eponymous Aristophanes play (1933, + reduction for 2 pianos, + 2 orchestral suites op. 19b and 19c, same year)
- A négy isten ligete (The Grove of the Four Gods) op. 38a (1943, + reduction for piano 4 hands, + orchestral suite op. 38b, Suite no. 2, same year)
- Capriccio op. 39 (1944, + reduction for piano 4 hands, same year)

==== Film music ====
- Hortobágy, 2 symphonic pictures derived from music to the film by Georg Hoellering, op. 21 (1934)
- Murder in the Cathedral op. 45b (1948), music for the British film of the same name by George Hoellering released in 1952, adaptation of T.S. Eliot work of the same name
- Alakok és formák (Shapes and Forms) op. 48 (score reported lost, 1949), music for the British film of the same name by George Hoellering
- Kövek, várak, emberek (1956), music for the Hungarian film of the same name by István Szőts

==== Other Orchestral works ====
- Concerto for violin op. 15 (reportedly lost, 1931)
- Divertissement op. 25 (1936)
- Symphony (unnumbered) Les Soli for string orchestra, harp and percussion op. 33 (dedicated to Florent Schmitt, 1941)
- In Memoriam op. 35 (1941)
- Sinfonietta (no. 1) for string orchestra op. 43 (1946)
- Variations, op. 44 (11 variations for orchestra on a Simple Theme, 'Temptations’, from the film Murder in the Cathedral) (1947–8)
- Suite no. 3 op. 56 (1952, written for the 100th anniversary of the Hungarian Philharmonic Orchestra)
- Sinfonietta no. 2 for string orchestra op. 62 (1956)

=== Works for voices ===
- 19 Magyar népdal (19 Hungarian Folksongs) for mezzo-soprano, tenor, and piano (1924)
- Motet for mezzo-soprano, contralto (or baritone) and piano (or organ) op. 8 (1926)
- Vocalise-étude for high voice and piano (1931)
- 3 nocturnes for soprano, flute, harp and string quartet op. 34 (1941)

=== Opera ===
- Le Chapeau bleu, opera buffa in two acts for soloists and orchestra op. 51 (1950)

=== Choral works ===
- Esti párbeszéd - A hegylakók (Evening Conversation - The Mountains) for mixed a cappella choir op. 16 (1932)
- 2 chœurs on poems of Charles d'Orléans for mixed a cappella choir op. 23 (1936)
- 4 madrigals for voice on poems of Charles d'Orléans for mixed a cappella choir op. 29 (1939)
- Hol járt a dal? for mixed a cappella choir op. 32 (1940)
- Missa in tono phrygio or Missa in diebus tribulationis for choir and orchestra op. 50 (1950)
- Missa for mixed choir and organ op. 54 (1952)
- Magnificat for female choirs and organ op. 60 (1954)
- 3 hymnes for la Sainte Vierge (3 Hymns for the Blessed Virgin), for female chorus and organ op. 65 (dedicated to Nadia Boulanger, 1958).

== See also ==
- Music of Hungary
