= Károly Binder =

Hungarian jazz pianist, composer and educator

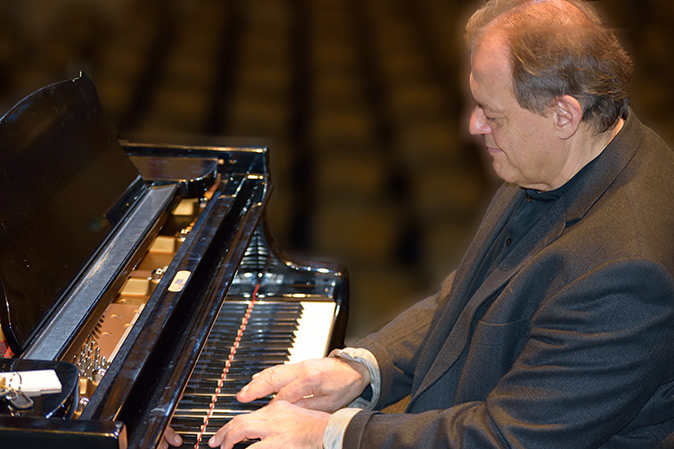
Károly Binder in 2017

Károly Binder (born 2 April 1956) is a Hungarian jazz pianist, composer and educator.

== Early life ==
Binder was born in Budapest on 2 April 1956. He was five years old when he started playing the piano and studied jazz in Budapest at the Béla Bartók Musical Training College from 1976 to 1979.

== Later life and career ==
From the early 1980s Binder led quartets and quintets that appeared at festivals in Europe. He performed and recorded with the free-jazz musician György Szabados in the middle of that decade and near its end played in duos with Theo Jörgensmann, Laszlo Sűle and others. Many of his frequent recordings from the early 1980s and into the 1990s have been reissued on Binder Music Manufactory, his own label. He is the head of the jazz department at the Liszt Ferenc Academy of Music in Budapest.

== Style ==
Binder's style of world music mingles elements of Japanese, lamaist, gamelan, Indian, and African music with the diatonic harmonies of classical music and the improvisational freedom of jazz.

== Selected discography ==
- (1981) Károly Binder Quartet Live at Bátok Terem with Mihály Dresch, Róbert Benkő
- (1982) Binder Quintet featuring John Tchicai
- (1985) Károly Binder " In Illo Tempore "
- (1991) Károly Binder and Ramesh Shotham Dance Music
- (1993) Károly Binder featuring Theo Jörgensmann Live at Music Academy Budapest
