= Hungarian wax pepper =

Medium variety of chili pepper

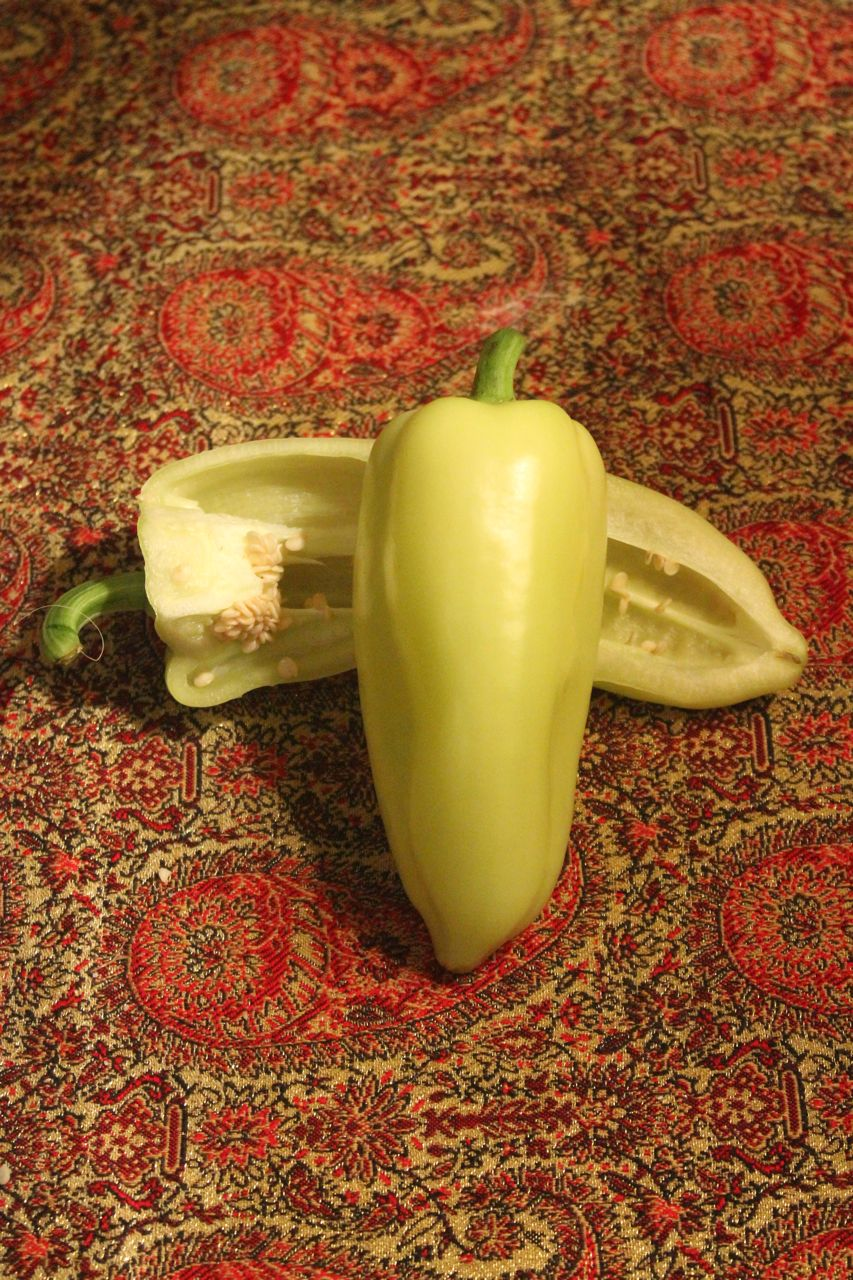
- Whole and cross section of a Hungarian wax pepper
- Species: Capsicum annuum
- Heat: Medium
- Scoville scale: 1,000–15,000 SHU

The Hungarian wax pepper is a medium variety of Capsicum annuum with a wide Scoville scale range of 1,000 to 15,000 Scoville units.

== Description ==
This pepper is usually harvested before maturity when still yellow. It measures between 4–6 inches in length (10–15 cm) which tapers to a rounded point. Upon maturity, the pepper becomes orange, then red. Although similar in appearance to banana peppers when immature, it is a different cultivar.

Due to the ease of cultivation and the productivity of the plant, many home gardeners pickle these whole or sliced in rings.

== Varieties ==
- Szentesi paprika is a mild pepper, and has PGI status. It is named after the town Szentes.
- TV paprika; TV stands for "tölteni való", meaning to-be-stuffed. A top value mild variant eaten raw, used for various dishes, or, as its name suggests, can be used for stuffed paprika, filled with meatball and served with tomato sauce, the taste being similar to lecsó.
- Lecsó paprika; a cheaper, overripe, mild variant, often with a shade of orange color. As its name suggests, often used for various lecsó-based dishes.
- Bogyiszlói paprika is a hot Hungarian wax pepper. It looks very similar to TV paprika, and is around 10,000 on the Scoville Scale. The pepper is named after the village Bogyiszló, where it is traditionally harvested.

== Gallery ==
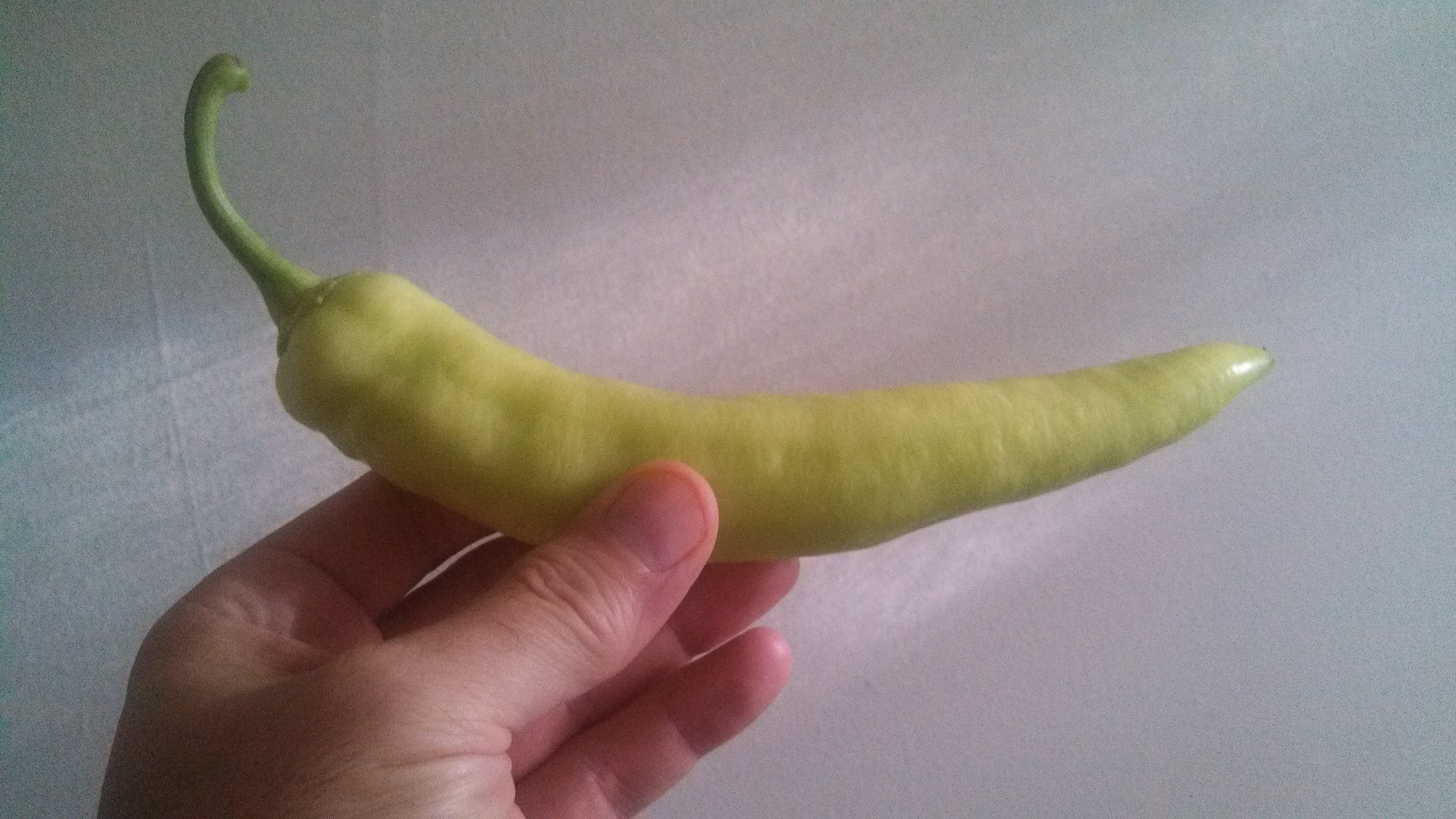

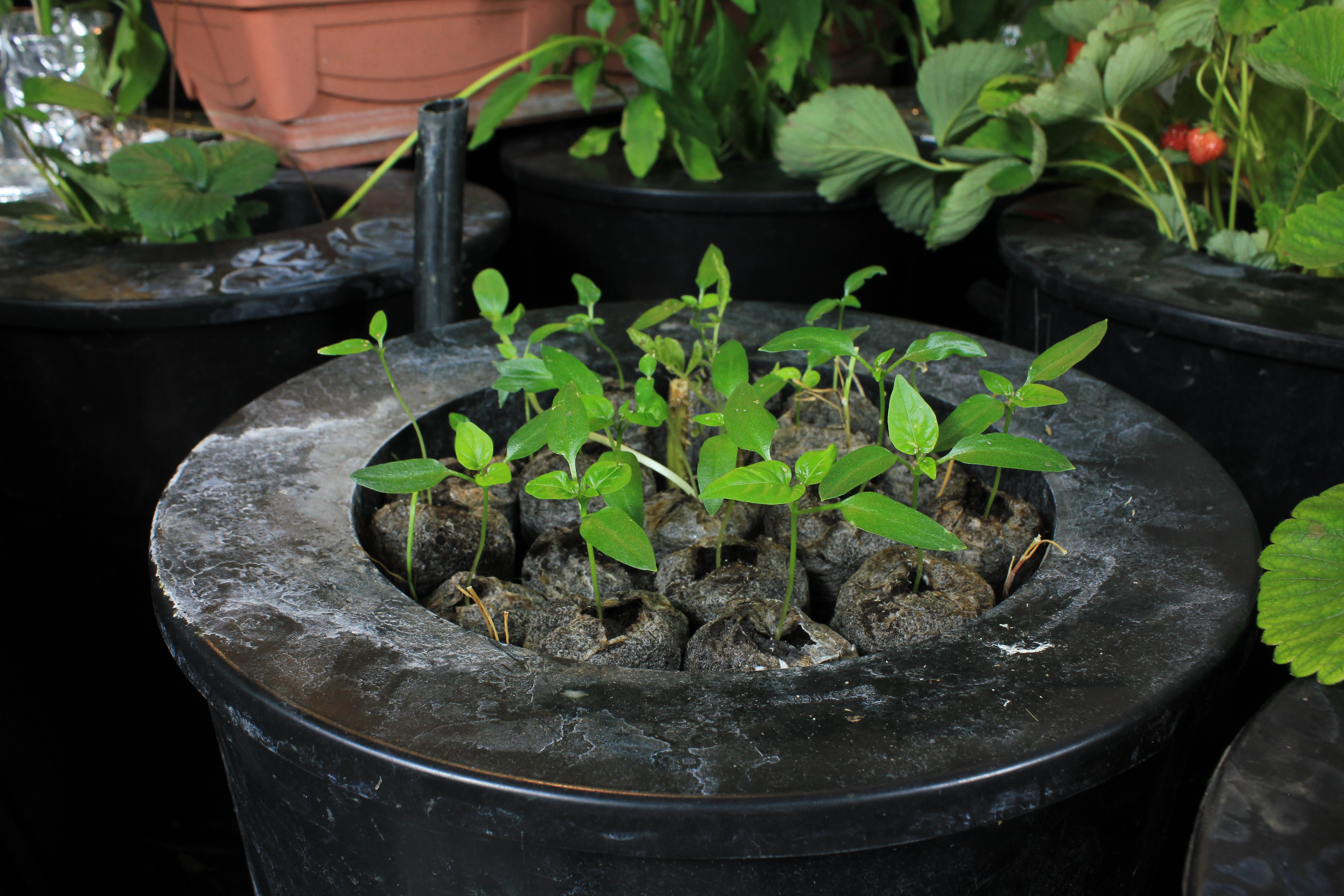

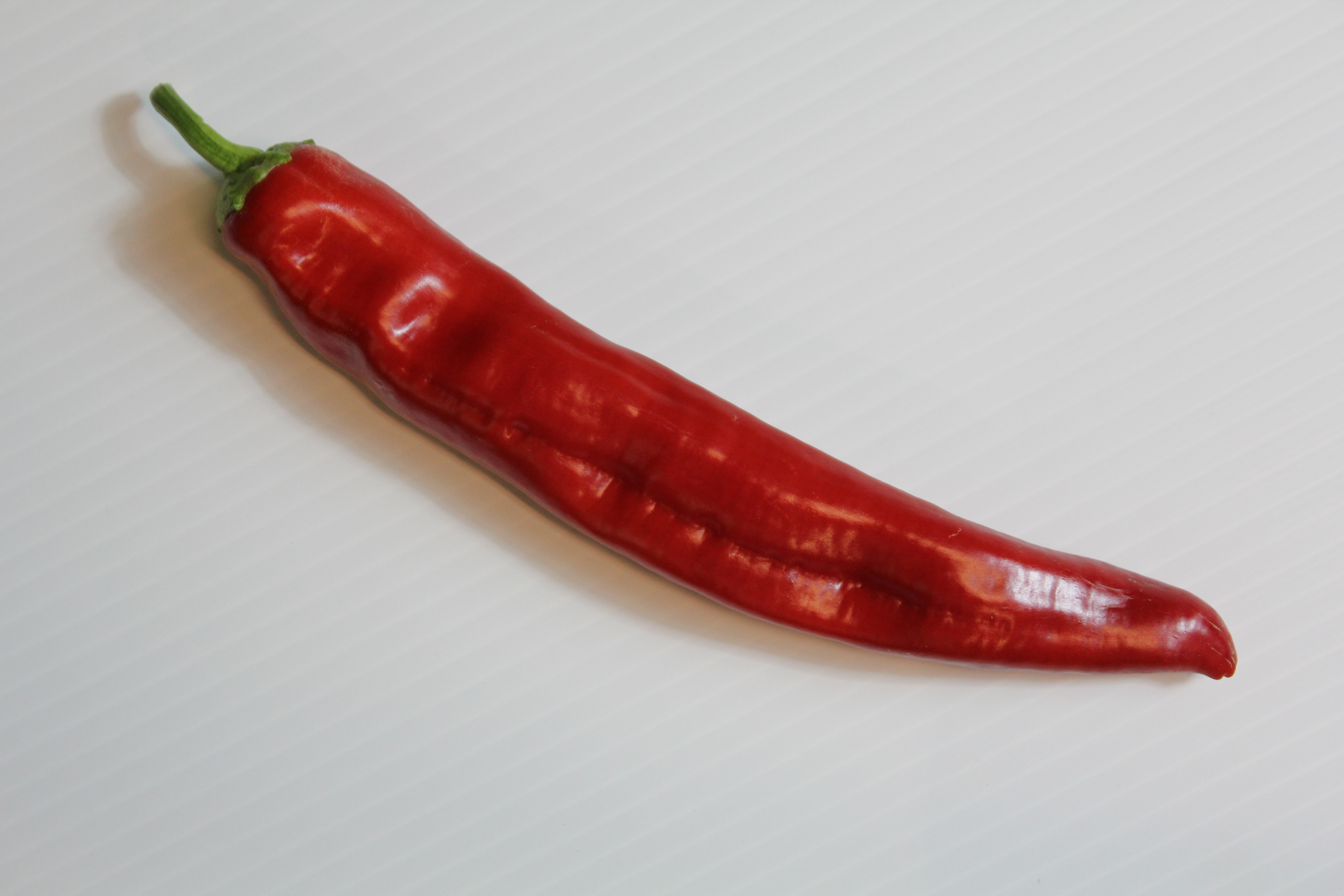

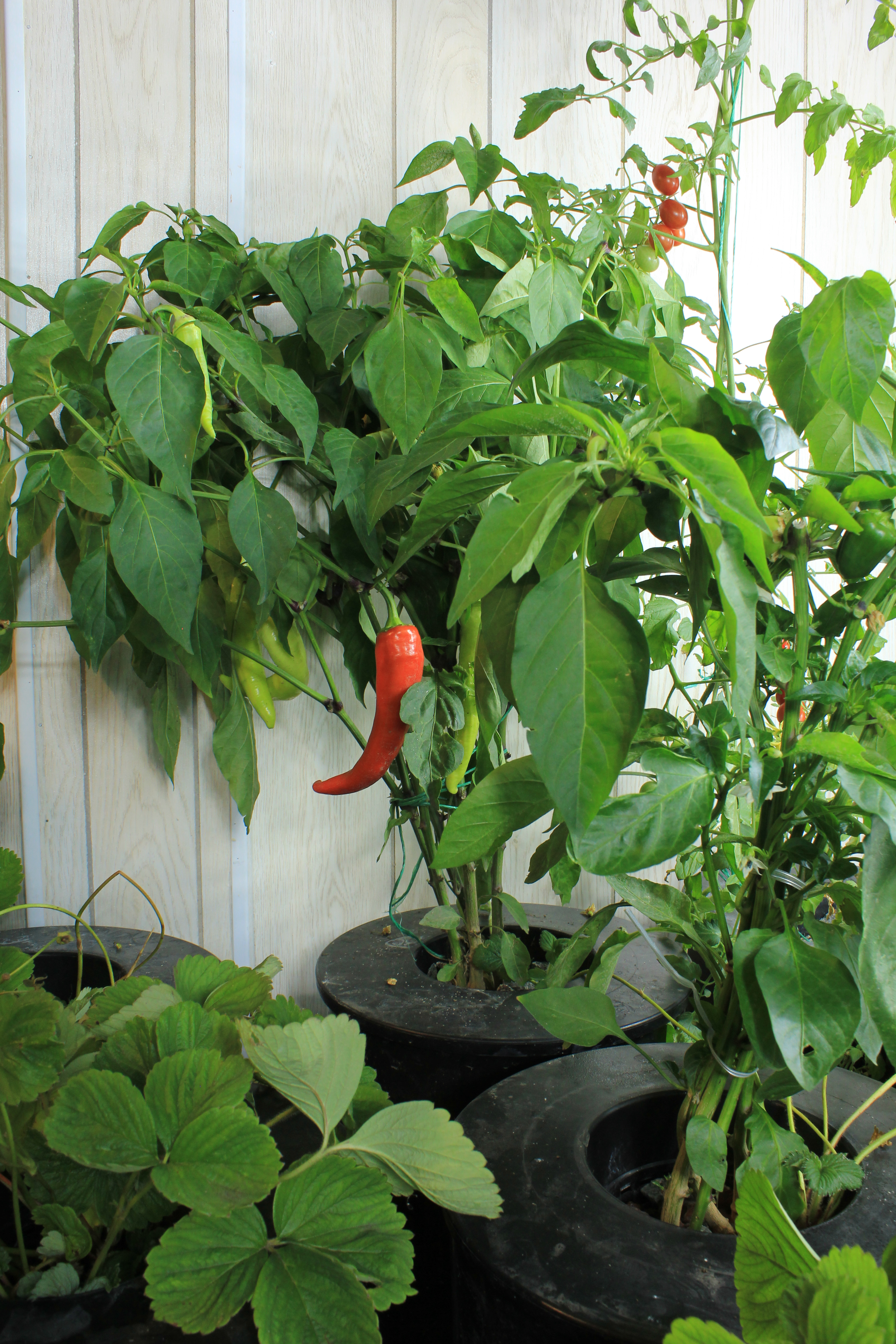

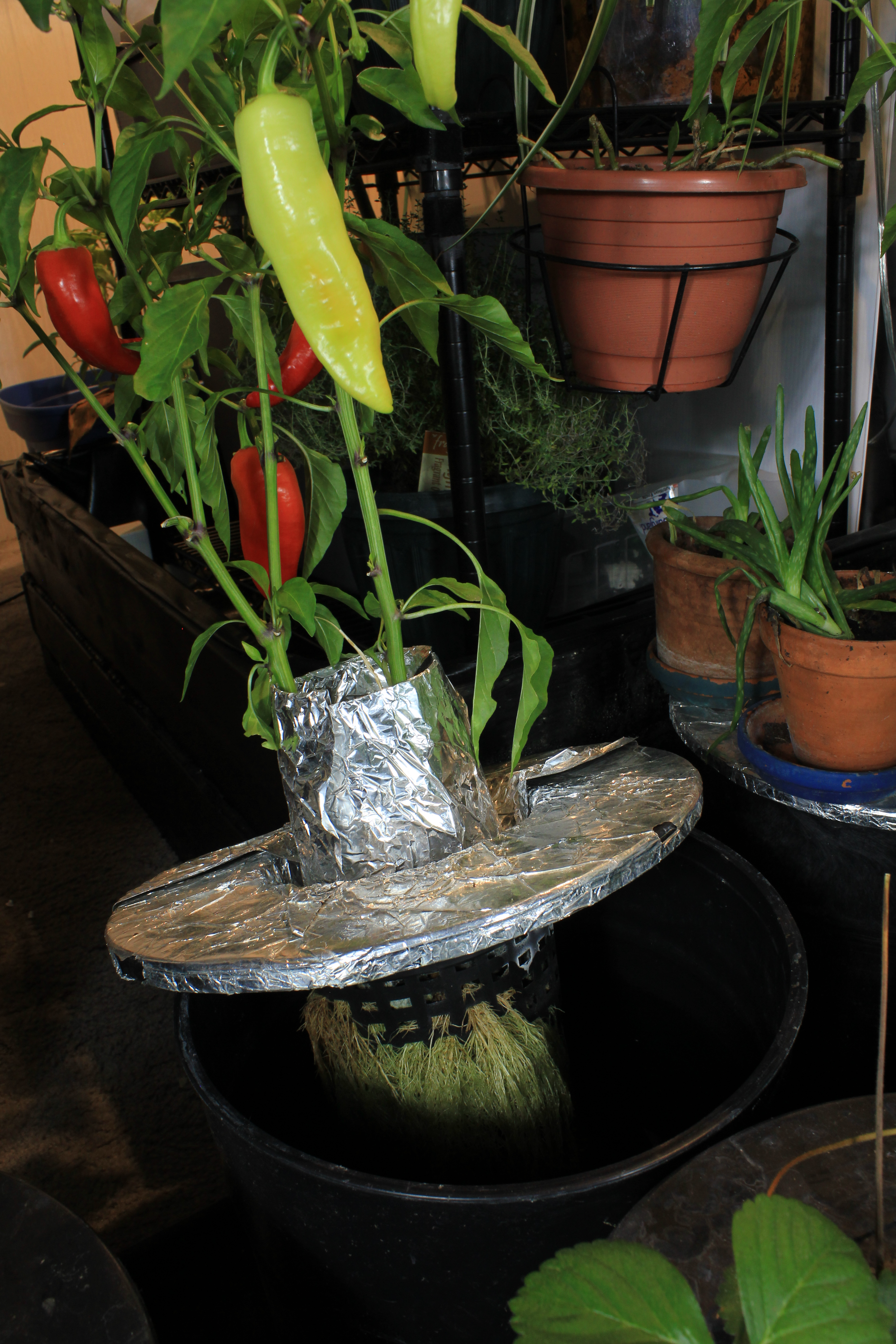

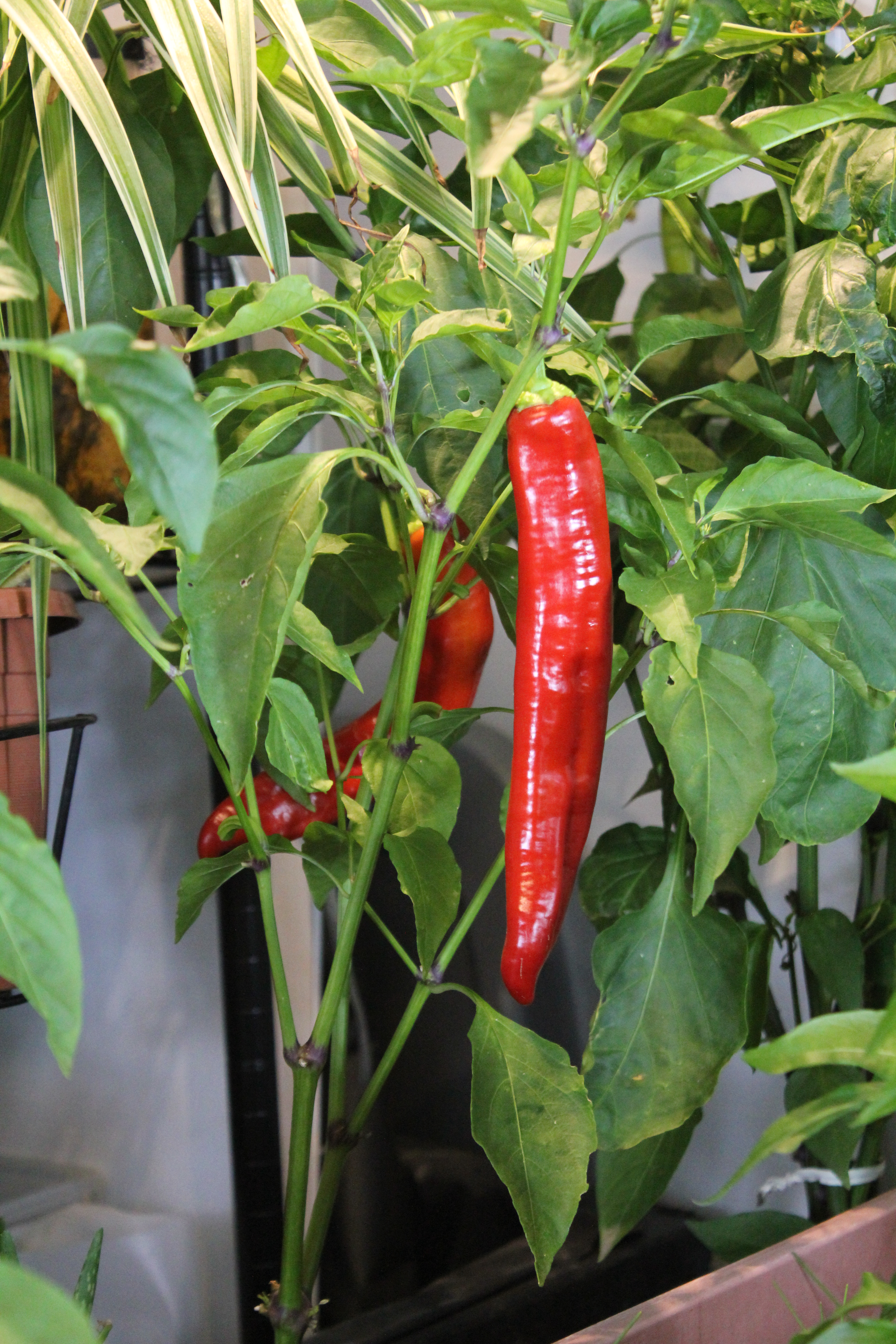

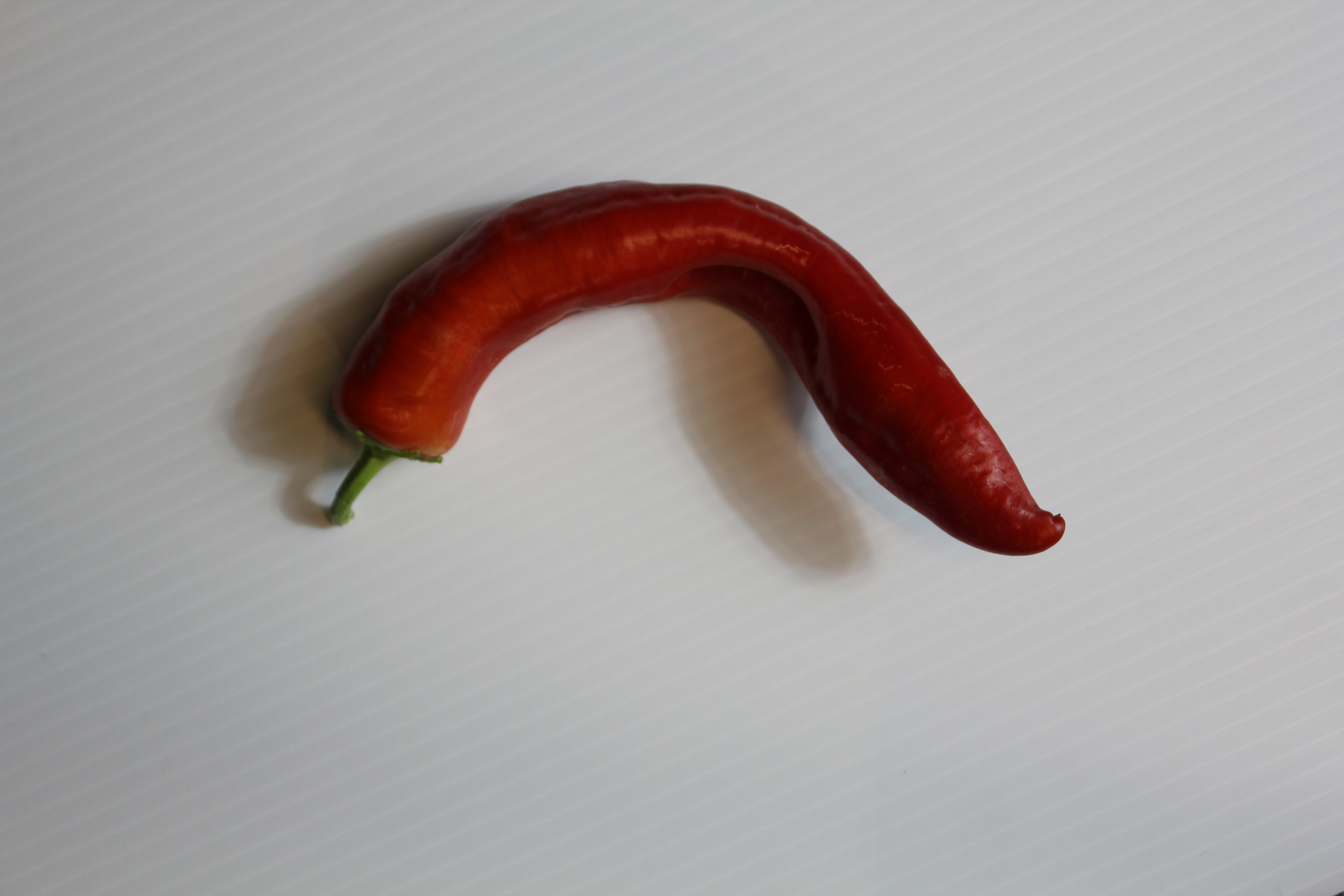

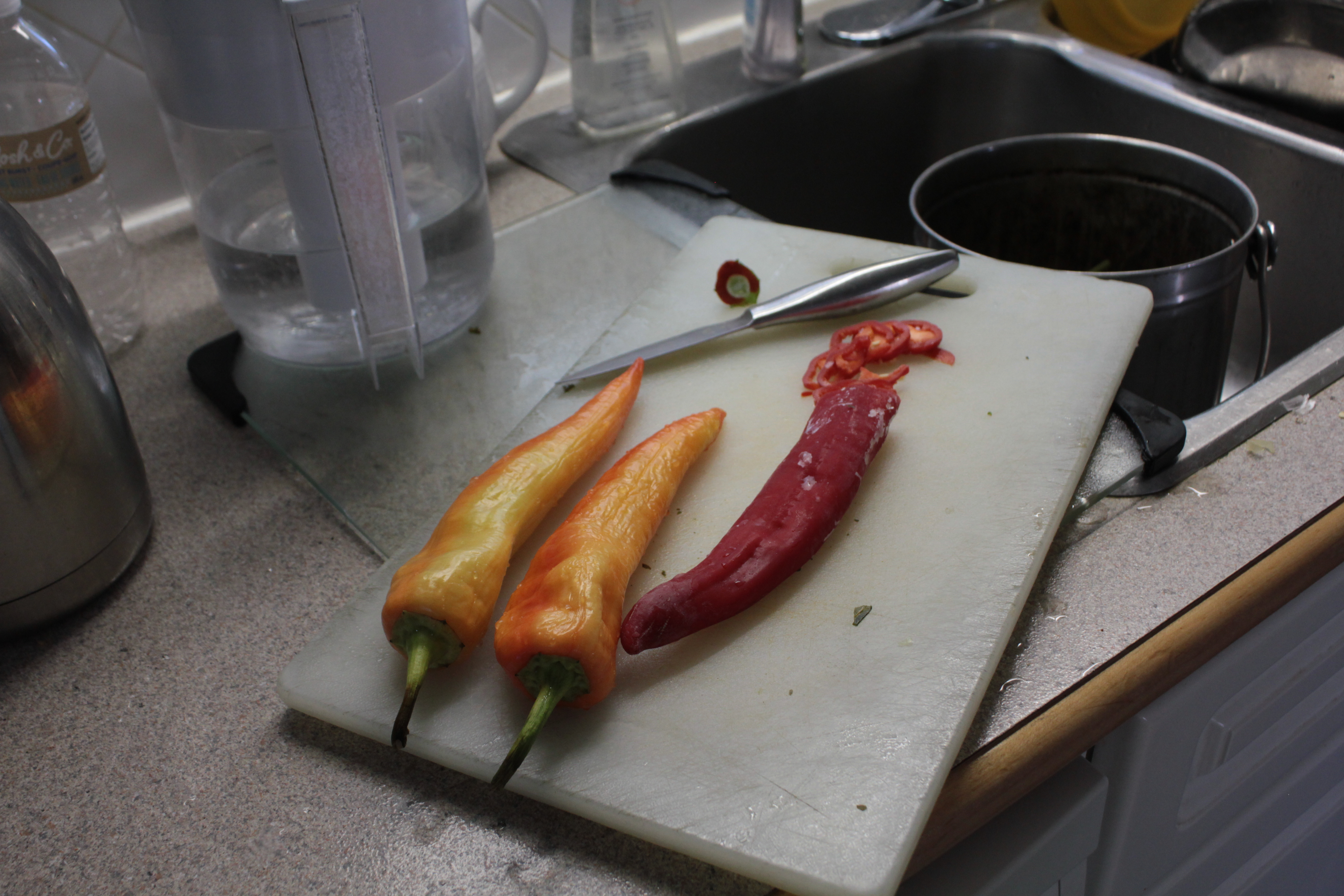

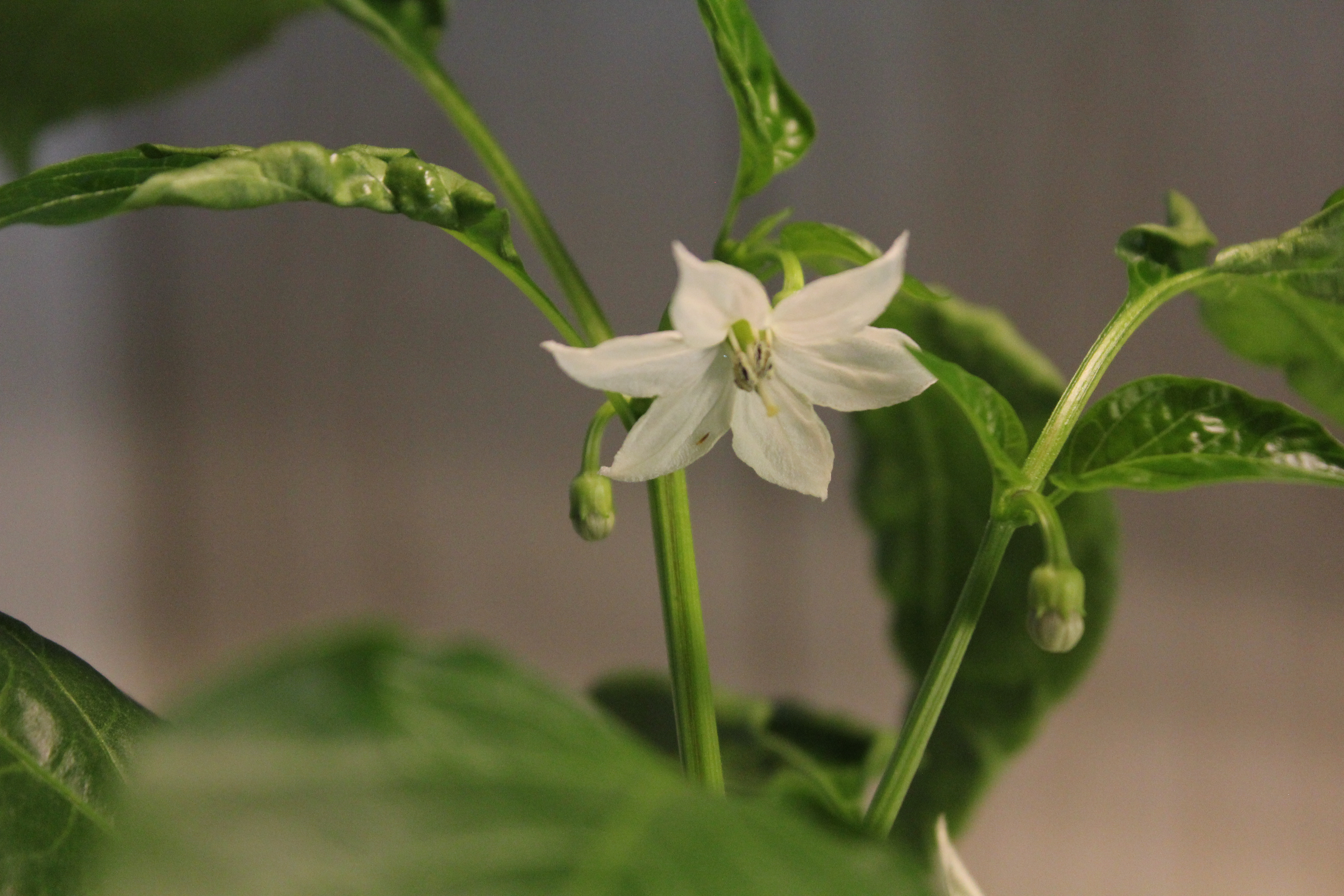

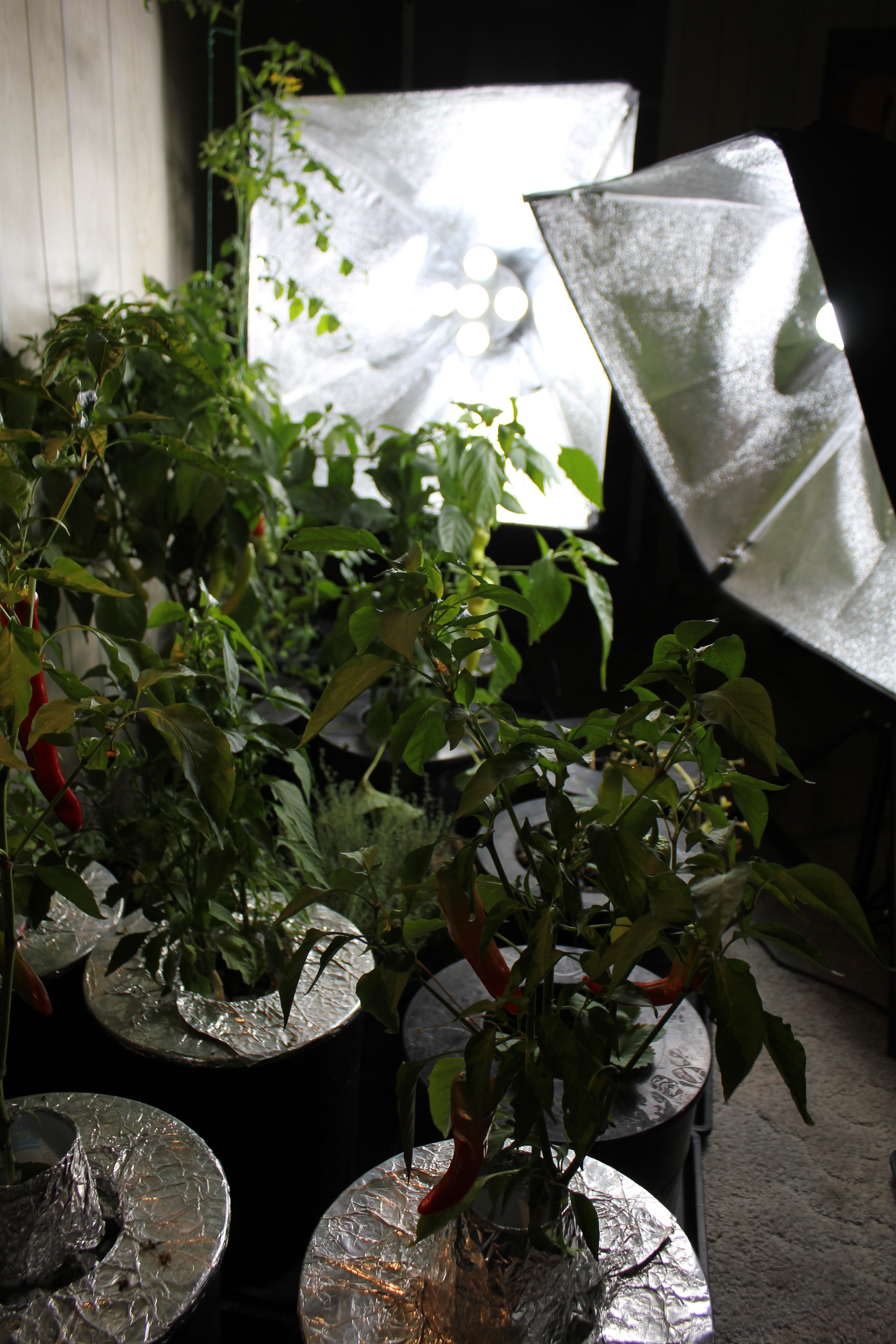

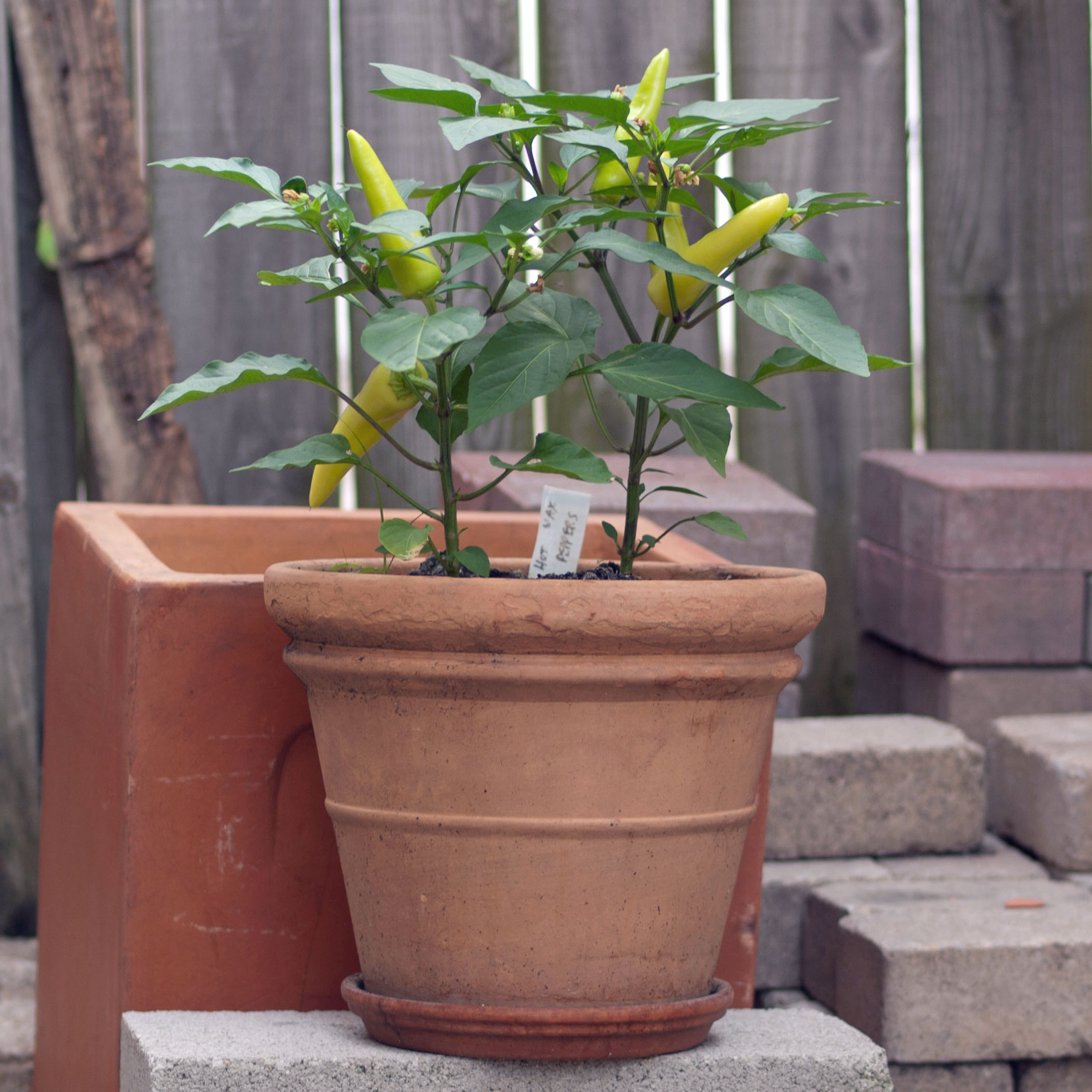

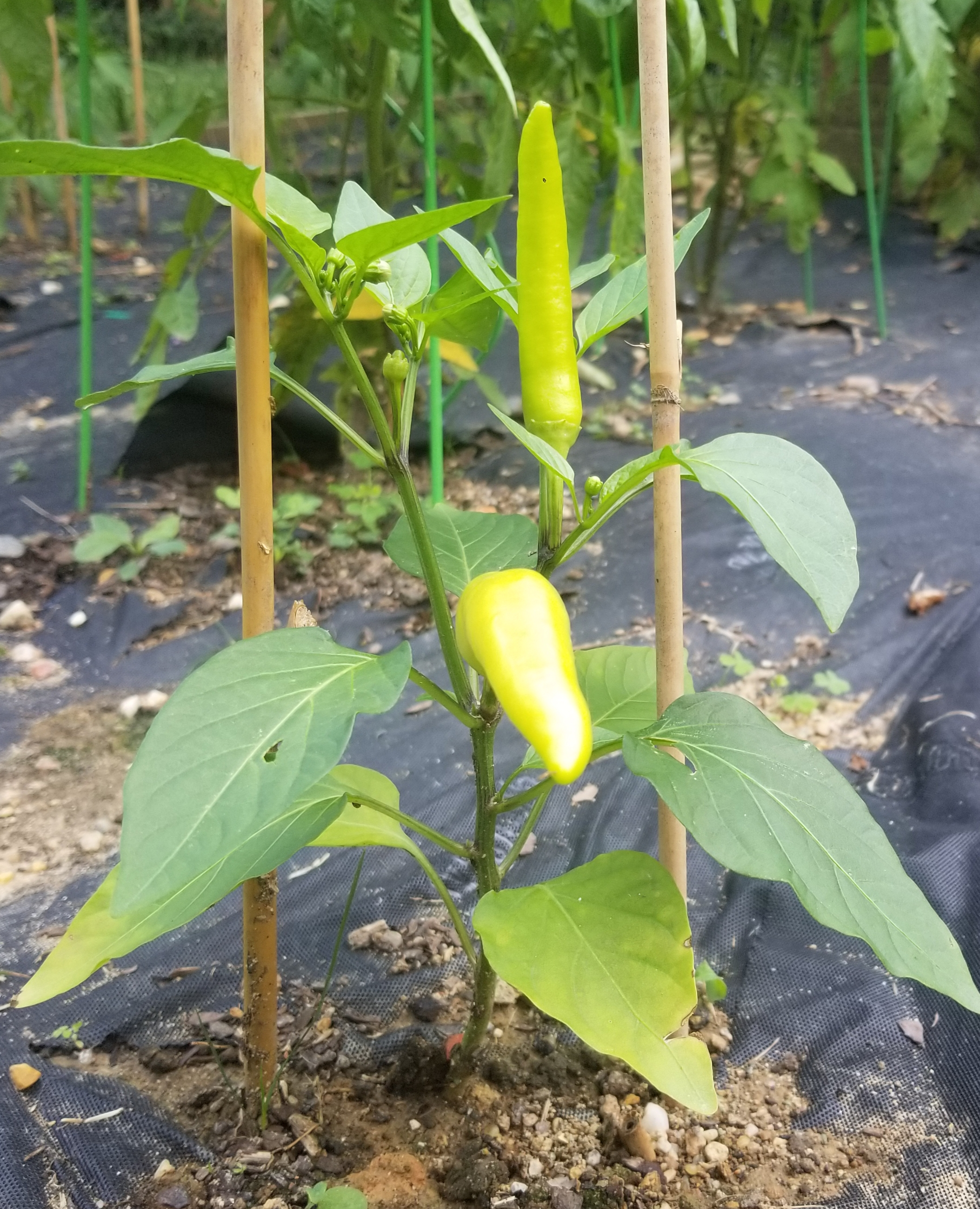

== See also ==
- Paprika
