= György Szabados =

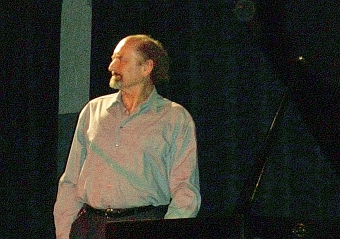
- 10 September 2005

Background information
- Born: 13 July 1939
- Origin: Budapest, Hungary
- Died: 10 June 2011 (aged 71)
- Genres: Jazz, folk
- Occupation: Pianist
- Labels: Fonó Records

György Szabados (13 July 1939 – 10 June 2011) was a Hungarian jazz pianist, and is sometimes referred to as the "father" or "unofficial king" of the Hungarian free jazz movement since the 1960s.

== Biography ==
Szabados was born in Budapest. Even though he started performing in 1962, his rise to fame is generally considered to have started with his quintet winning the renowned San Sebastian Jazz Festival Grand Prize in the free jazz category in 1972. His first album that was recorded with a quartet in 1975 was entitled Wedding. Despite the abstraction of the music, the record was well received in Hungary and abroad, thereby setting the scene for his subsequent albums. International recognition is probably noted by including the album in The Essential Jazz Records compiled by Max Harrison, Eric Thacker and Stuart Nicholson (Volume 2: Modernism to Postmodernism). Even though he could not record again until 1983, he maintained his status by establishing the Kassák Workshop for Contemporary Music, in which a new generation of musicians acquired a free and intuitive manner of playing jazz, with a distinct Hungarian sound. Generally, his collaborators would make up the next generation of Hungarian jazz, including acclaimed saxophone player Mihály Dresch. Further international recognition followed in the 1980s, through his collaboration with Anthony Braxton on their duo record Szabraxtondos. In Hungary, he proceeded to form MAKUZ, or the Royal Hungarian Court Orchestra, which membership varied, but always consisted of at least nine musicians that were committed to free, improvised music. Subsequently, he still collaborated with Roscoe Mitchell on their 1998 record Jelenés (Revelation) and again with Braxton and Vladimir Tarasov this time for the live recording Triotone. He was awarded the Kossuth Prize, the most prestigious cultural award in Hungary, in 2011 by the President of Hungary. He died in Nagymaros on 10 June 2011.

== Influences ==
Szabados' work and thinking is distinctly placed in Hungarian culture. Most importantly, a good deal of his music is influenced by Hungarian folk music, mainly from Transylvania. Apart from direct folk associations, this influenced on Szabados' work was to a great extent mediated through the work of Hungarian composer Béla Bartók (1881–1945), who pioneered the reintegration of folk tradition in classical by his numerous field recordings. As he formulated it himself:

'Apart from the occasional moments, it is difficult to find traces of Bartók's music in our music. Hungarian music has such characteristic features that, when they appear, they are immediately linked to Bartók, whereas the real kinship is not with Bartók but, on a much deeper level, with Hungarian music, a world view, and a special taste'

Apart from folk influences in his work, Szabados always gave clear references to other key instances of Hungarian culture. His 1983 record Adyton, for instance, is partially a reference to Hungarian poet Endre Ady, whereas his 1989 album A szarvassá vált fiak (Sons that became deer) was inspired by the Hungarian Revolution of 1956. Choosing the word Adyton as a title for his record also shows the Szabados' philosophical thinking about his music. A documentary film about his work was issued by Duna TV.

== Awards ==
- 1983: Ferenc Liszt Prize
- 1990: Artisjus
- 1995: Anna Neufeld
- 2001: His album Time Flies was voted Record of the Year in Hungary
- 2001: Szabó Gábor Life Achievement Award (Hungarian Jazz Federation)
- 2011: Kossuth Prize (awarded by the President of the Hungarian Republic)

== Discography ==
- 1964 György Szabados: B-A-C-H élmények (Modern Jazz Anthology 64) Qualiton LPX 7279-80
- 1975 György Szabados: Az esküvő (The Wedding) Hungaroton-Pepita SLPX 17475
- 1980 György Szabados: Szabados Jazz
- 1983 György Szabados: Adyton Hungaroton-Krém SLPX 17724
- 1985 György Szabados/Anthony Braxton: Szabraxtondos Hungaroton-Krém SLPX 17909
- 1989 György Szabados: A szarvassá vált fiak (Sons that became deer) Hungaroton-Krém SLPX 37215
- 1991 György Szabados és a Makuz: Homoki Zene Adyton 005
- 1992 György Szabados: A szent főnixmadár dürrögései Adyton 004
- 1992 Szabados Trio Elfelejtett énekek (Forgotten Songs) Fonó Records FA 12-01
- 1998 György Szabados/Roscoe Mitchell: Jelenés (Revelation) Fonó Records FA-038-2
- 1999 György Szabados: Az események titkos története (The Secret History of the Events) Fonó Records FA-068-2
- 2000 György Szabados: Az ido múlása (Time Flies) November Music 20022
- 2004 Miklós Mákó/ György Szabados: A szépség szíve (The Heart of Beauty) Fonó Records FA-213-2
- 2005 Anthony Braxton/Gyorgy Szabados/Vladimir Tarasov: Triotone Leo 416
- 2006 György Szabados és Új Dimenzió Műhely: Elégia 1956 Logos
- 2007 György Szabados Szextett: Baltás zsoltár Győrfree Műhely/Harmónia (orig. 1973)
- 2007 György Szabados és a Makuz: Készülődés a csatára Győrfree Műhely/Harmónia (orig. 1987)
- 2008 György Szabados: Boldogasszony földje (Harangok) (Bells: The Land of Boldogasszony) BMC Records BMC CD 130
- 2010 György Szabados/Joëlle Léandre: Live at Magyarkakanizsa BMC Records CD 183
