= Ando Drom =

Ando Drom are a Romani music ensemble from Hungary, founded in 1984. "Ando drom" means "on the road" in the Romani language.

They have devoted themselves to the preservation and continued evolution of the traditional music of their culture. Their musical director is multi-instrumentalist and vocalist Jeno Zsigó and Mónika Juhász Miczura ("Mitsou") has sung with them for many years. They have also featured guest musicians from the French group Bratsch and the cimbalom virtuoso Kálmán Balogh.
