= Mónika Juhász Miczura =

Hungarian Roma singer (born 1972)

Mónika Juhász-Miczura
- Born: Mónika Juhász-Miczura; 3 November 1972 (age 53); Berettyóújfalu, Hungary
- Genres: Folk music, world music
- Occupation: Singer
- Years active: circa 1995–present

Mónika Juhász Miczura is a Hungarian Roma singer, also known as Mitsou and Mitsoura. She is a former member of the folk ensemble Ando Drom, and a founding member of the electronic/world music group Mitsoura. She has contributed to film soundtracks; in Tony Gatlif's film Gadjo dilo (1997) she provided the voice of an unseen singer pivotal to the story. She has also sung in the films Kísértések (2002), Swing (2002), Vengo (2000) (uncredited), and Je suis né d'une cigogne (1999). She formed the ensemble Mitsoura that released two albums so far: Mitsoura (2003) and Dura Dura Dura (2008). She has been a guest artist on the albums of other groups, including Fanfare Ciocărlia's Queens and Kings (2007), Bratsch's Rien Dans Les Poches (2000), Besh O Drom's Once I Catch the Devil (2006), GYI! (2005) and Can't Make Me! - Nekemtenemmutogatol (2003). She is a member of the "Global Vocal Meeting" project.

== Early life ==
Mónika Miczura was born in Berettyóújfalu, Hungary on 3 November 1972. She has four sisters. Very early, at the age of 5 she lost her father. She spent her childhood in Békéscsaba. The traditional romani-culture had been part of her daily life, at special family occasions (funerals, mournings, pomanas), there was a long tradition of a cappella (without instruments) singing. That is where her exceptional, deep style of performance stood out by the community, however at that time she had no idea what performance arts was about. Her first appearance on stage was at the age of 13 in the Jókai Mór theatre in Békéscsaba where she was cast to perform in the musical ‘Twist Oliver’. During these days, she discovered the world of Indian, Arabic, Persian and Chinese music in the music collection of the local library, which had a huge impact on her. For the recommendation of her teachers, she applied and was admitted to the famous Literature-Drama course at Horváth Mihály Grammar School in Szentes. That is where she first performed traditional Romani songs on stage, what she only did in small, family circles before. Those days the Romani folk-traditions were not part of the official Hungarian Folk Music, therefore it was a completely new experience for most non-Romani audience. In the 1980s, the first cultural Romani clubs, camps were organized where Mónika was a regular attendant. They soon discovered her unique, characteristic performing talent, as a result she was invited to be the singer of the Romani-folk band called ‘Ando Drom’ at the age of 17. After a year of membership, a 3-year break came because she gave birth to her first daughter, Mónika. In 1994, she went back to stage and the ‘Ando Drom’, which then became an internationally acknowledged worldwide band.

== AndoDrom, Mitsoura and collaborations ==
The ‘AndoDrom’ band travelled the world and was a regular participant in the most important international folk-festivals. 3 albums were made at that time: Kaj Phirel O Del (1995) Gypsy Life On The Road (1997) and Phari Mamo (1997). As a result, others discovered Mónika’s unusual, unique voice. She was cast for several international movies, theatres and plenty of other music productions asked her for collaboration. That is when she first experienced that her voice and the culture she represents have the ‘raison d'etre’ (the most important reason or purpose for someone or something's existence) when it is grabbed out of its traditionalist comfort-zone and is mixing with the culture of other countries, origins, and the impacts of present age ‘trends’. The mid-1990s pop-music culture has also most influenced her e.g. Björk, Massive Attack or Portishead. That is when she first had the idea of starting her own band, that could mix all these artistic influences. In 2000, she quit AndoDrom and she looked for new musicians from the most varied musical backgrounds and genres (Etno, Jazz, Classical and ElectronicMusic). That is how Mitsoura was born. Mónika Miczura says: "My artistic creed, my Ars Poetica is that 'Everything alters me, but nothing changes me.' (Salvador Dalí) and also that 'the mixing of cultures is a useful thing' (Béla Bartók) that is why I am not afraid to mix clean traditions with even contemporary, urban culture, because this is not the dilution of traditions but rather a way to make them alive. In my view, traditions are not museum-wise understood, dusty imprints of a bygone era, but rather possibilities for existing and current forms of expression." The band Mitsoura had released two albums in this spirit: Mitsoura (2003) and DuraDuraDura (2008). They had performed in significant international festivals and concert-theatres (WOMAD, WOMEX, Royal Opera House London, Grand Théâtre de Bordeaux, Fete de la Misique Paris etc.). 2011 was their last time on stage, but after 3 years of creative pause, the Mitsoura is working on a new album-material.

On December 16, 2014, it was reported that Miczura has filed a civil suit in Manhattan supreme court, naming Beyoncé, Jay-Z and Timbaland as co-defendants in a copyright infringement suit. Her lawyers allege that a recurring section of the song Drunk in Love is a digitally manipulated excerpt from the 1995 track Bajba, Bajba Pelém.

== Discography ==
- AndoDrom - Kaj Phirel O Del - 1995.
- Chico And The Gipsyes - Vagabundo - 1996.
- László Dés / Péter Geszti - A Dzsungel Könyve - musical - 1996. (BMG)
- AndoDrom - Gypsy Life On The Road - 1997. (north pacific music)
- AndoDrom - Phari Mamo - 1997. (network)
- GadjoDilo - Original Soundtrack - 1997.
- Bratsch - Rien Dans Les Poches - 1998. (network)
- Gypsy Queens - Compilation - 1999. (network)
- László Dés - Akasztottak - 1999.
- Vengo - Original Soundtrack - 2000.
- Global Vocal Meeting - 2000.
- Swing - Original Soundtrack - 2001.
- Besh o Drom - Nekemtenemmutogatol - 2002.
- Mitsoura - Mitsoura - 2003.
- Besh o Drom - Gyí - 2004.
- Besh o Drom - Ha megfogom az ördögöt - 2005.
- Fanfare Ciocarlia - The Gypsy Queens And Kings - 2007. (asphalt tango)
- Mitsoura - DuraDuraDura - 2008.
- Hans-Erik Philip - And Other Dreams - 2012.

== Filmography ==
- Meddő (dir. Tamás Almási) - 1995.
- Érzékek Iskolája (dir. András Sólyom) - 1996.
- Gadjo Dilo (dir. Tony Gatlif) - 1997.
- Tusindfryd (dir. Vibeke Gad) - 1998.
- Je suis né d'une cigogne (dir. Tony Gatlif) - 1999.
- Akasztottak (dir. Péter Gothár) - 1999.
- Vengo (dir. Tony Gatlif) - 2000.
- Swing (dir. Tony Gatlif) - 2001.
- Kísértések (dir. Zoltán Kamondi) - 2002.
- Zafir (dir. Malene Vilstrup) - 2003.
- Kelj fel és járj! (dir. Zsolt Balogh) - 2007.
- A Hópárduc talpra áll (dir. András Kollmann) - 2011.
- Two Shadows (dir. Greg Cahill) - 2012.

== Theatre productions ==
- A Dzsungel könyve - musical (dir. Hegedűs D. Géza) - 1996.
- The Black Eyed Roses - musical (dir. Alan Lyddiard) - 2003.
