= Ferenc Sebő =

Hungarian folklorist and musician (1947–2026)

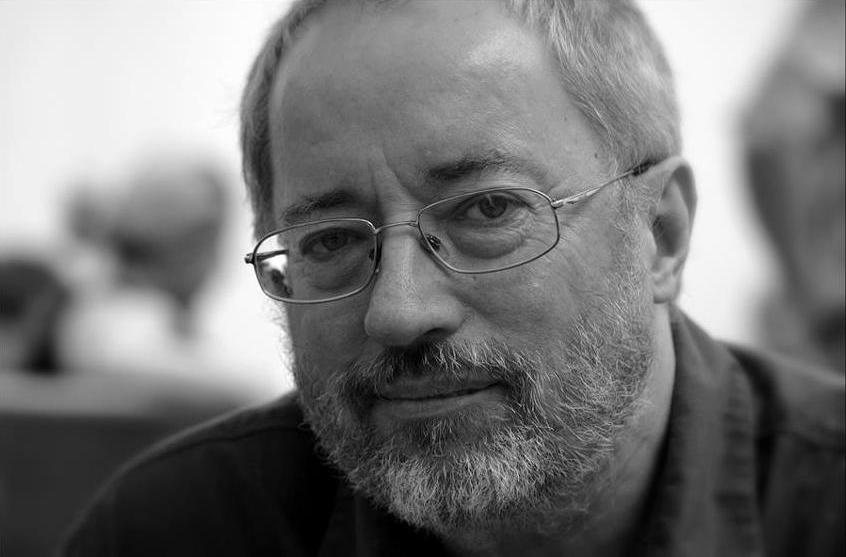
Sebő, c. 2017

Ferenc Sebő (Hungarian pronunciation: [ˈʃɛbøː ˈfɛrɛnt͡s], 10 February 1947 – 27 April 2026) was a Hungarian folklorist and musician, best known as the bandleader for the Sebő Ensemble, a band that produced many future stars, including Márta Sebestyén (later of Muzsikás). The Sebő Ensemble was one of the best-known groups of the Hungarian roots revival in the 1970s.

Sebő died after a long illness on 27 April 2026, at the age of 79.
