= Mihály Dresch =

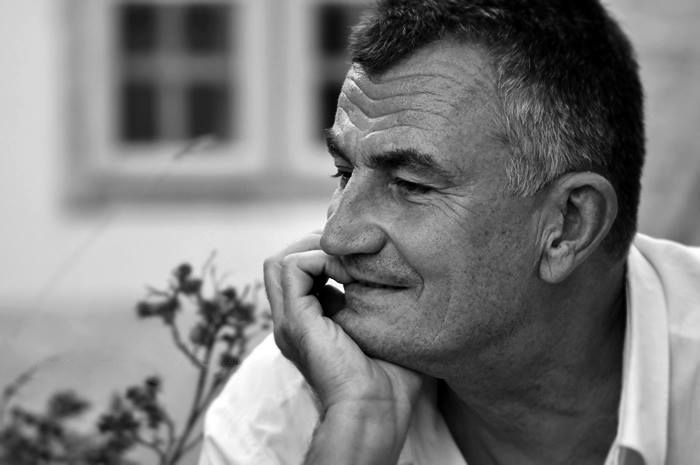

Background information
- Born: July 10, 1955; Budapest, Hungary
- Genres: Jazz, folk
- Occupation: Musician
- Instrument: Saxophone
- Labels: BMC

Mihály Dresch (born 1955) is a Hungarian saxophone player. He plays a combination of American free jazz and traditional Hungarian folk music.

Dresch was studying to become an engineer when he turned to jazz. He was a member of the Károly Binder Quartet. Since 1998 he has performed in a quartet with István Baló (drums), Ferenc Kovács (violin), Miklós Lukács (dulcimer), Mátyás Szandai (double bass) has existed since 1998.

Dresch has worked with John Tchicai, Archie Shepp, Roscoe Mitchell, Chico Freeman, David Murray, Hamid Drake, and Dewey Redman. The project with Archie Shepp led to the Hungarian Bebop recording of 2002, on which Shepp plays Dresch's compositions. Dresch has performed at jazz festivals worldwide, including the London Jazz Festival.

Dresch is a member of György Szabados's band, the MAKUZ Ensemble. Szabados is part of the free music movement in Hungary.

== Discography ==
=== As leader or co-leader ===
- Cool Sky (2001)
- Quiet as It Is (Budapest Music Center Records, 2002)
- Egyenes Zene (Straight Music) (BMC, 2004)
- Argyelus (BMC, 2007)
- Gondellied in the Sahara with Miklos Lukacs, Michael Schiefel, Matyas Szandai (BMC, 2010)
- Sharing the Shed with Hamid Drake, Lafayette Gilchrist, Matyas Szandai (BMC, 2010)
- Labirintus with Miklos Lukacs (Fono, 2013)
- Zea with Chris Potter (BMC, 2017)
- 1985 Sóhajkeserű (Bem rakpart, Budapest, 1985. május 3.) Hungaroton Jazz Studium No. 3 (MC)
- 1985 Kvartet Drech - Peti Jubilarni Internacionalni Susret Dzez Muzicara "Naissus Jazz '85" Magánkiadás
- 1987 Hazafelé Magánkiadás Jazz Studium No. 6. (MC)
- 1989 Sóhajkeserű (10. Kölni Jazzhaus Fesztivál, 1988. április 2.) Hungaroton
- 1990 Gondolatok a régiekről Adyton
- 1993 Dresch Dudás Mihály Quartet: Zeng a lélek Adyton
- 1995 Dresch Dudás Mihály Quartett: Folyondár Adyton
- 1996 Túl a vizen (Fonó)
- 1997 Dresch Dudás Mihály: Hűs-ég (Fonó)
- 1998 Dresch Dudás Mihály Quartet: Révészem, révészem... (Fonó)
- 2000 Riding the Wind (Mozdulatlan Utazás) (November Music)
- 2002 Hungarian Bebop with Archie Shepp (BMC)
- 2006 Live Reed (Élő nád) (X-Production)
- 2009 Ritka madár (X-Production)
