= Róbert Bérczesi =

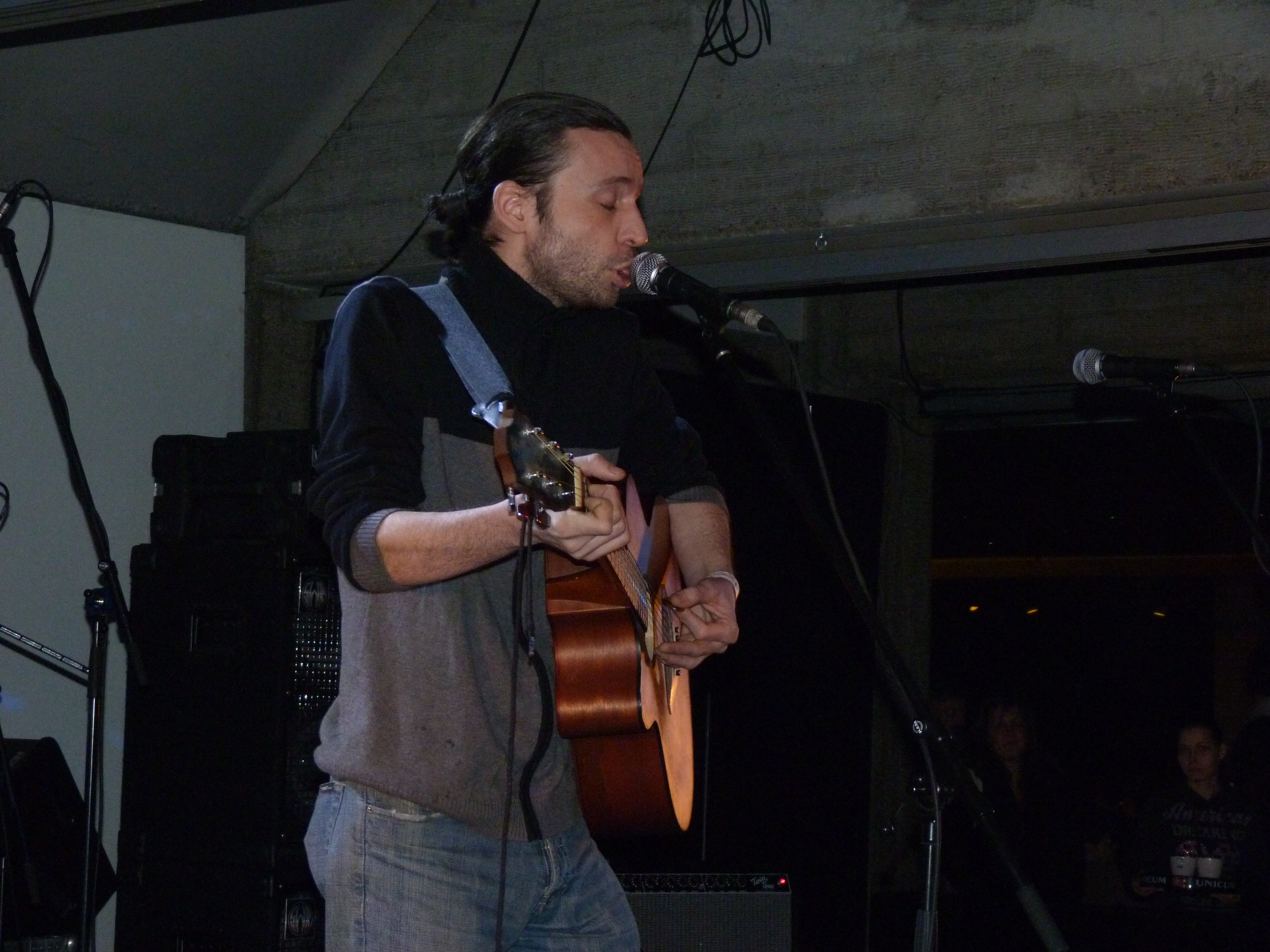
- Róbert Bérczesi at Gödör Klub, 2012

Background information
- Born: 12 September 1976
- Occupations: Musician, singer, songwriter
- Instruments: Vocals, guitar, bass
- Years active: 1993-
- Labels: 1g records, Sony Music Entertainment

Róbert Bérczesi (born in 1976) is a Hungarian musician, best known as the lead singer and songwriter of the Hungarian cult band hiperkarma. Before hiperkarma, he won a Hungarian talent spotter (the Pepsi Generation Next at 1997) with his band called BlaBla, then as the winner of the talent spotter they could make their own studio album Kétségbeejtően átlagos with the Sony Music Entertainment label. With hiperkarma, they only made two albums, hiperkarma (2000) and amondo (2003). After hiperkarma he had two notable projects, Biorobot with the Hungarian songwriter András Nemes, and his solo project, Én meg az ének.

== Discography ==
BlaBla

- Izék (demo) (1996)
- Kétségbeejtően átlagos (1998)

Hiperkarma

- hiperkarma (2000)
- amondó (2003)
- konyharegény (2014)
- délibáb (2017)
- a napsütötte rész (2019)
- Exits Exist (2023)

Én meg az ének (solo project)

- Én meg az ének: Emléxel? (2011)

Biorobot

- BioRoBoT (2013)
