= Bogyiszló Orchestra =

The Bogyiszló Orchestra is a Hungarian folk orchestra that plays dance music, and was associated with the Busójárás carnival in Mohács.
