= Hungarian folk music =

Hungarian folk music (Note: Hungarian: magyar népzene, pronounced [ˈmɒɟɒr ˈneːbzɛnɛ]) is characterised by complex melodic patterns, rhythmic diversity, ornamentalisation and the use of a distinctive blend of traditional instruments. It covers an array of styles, including those that accompany Hungarian folk dances, such as the csárdás, hajdútánc, héjsza, nóta and verbunkos. Instruments used in Hungarian folk music include the citera, cimbalom, doromb, duda, kanászkürt, kaval, koboz, tárogató, tambourine, tambura, tapan, tekero, ütőgardon and zurna.

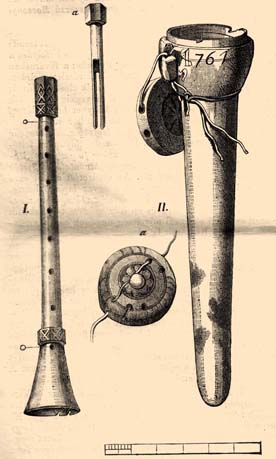
A 19th-century depiction of the töröksíp (“Turkish pipe”), a variation of the zurna. At the time, it was also known as the tárogató, but this name was later repurposed for a new instrument derived from it.

The name Népzene is also used for Hungarian folk music as an umbrella designation of a number of related styles of traditional folk music from Hungary and Hungarian minorities living in modern-day Slovakia, Ukraine, Moldova (Csángó), Romania (Transylvania) (Székely), Croatia and Serbia.

== Notable Hungarian folk bands and artists ==
Héttorony Hangászok

Bea Palya

- Dankó, Pista, famous Romani musician, composer of many folk-like art songs
- Fonó Folk Band, authentic folk music band
- Gyurity, István, operetta singer and folk music performer
- Juhász Miczura, Mónika, Romani music singer
- Kaláka, authentic folk music band
- Muzsikás, authentic folk music band
- Lovász, Irén, authentic folk song performer
- Nox, folk-like pop band
- Palya, Bea, folk and world music performer
- Sebestyén, Márta, famous authentic folk music performer
- Dalriada, folk metal band
- Tükrös Ensemble, authentic folk music band
- Dűvő, well-known traditional folk musicians

== Influence in Hungarian classical music ==
Hungarian composer Franz Liszt began composing 19 Hungarian Rhapsodies for piano in 1846, five of which were later orchestrated, thus being the first pieces of Hungarian classical music by a major composer to incorporate sources from folk music.

During the 20th century, Hungarian classical composers were influenced by the traditional music of their nation which may be considered as a repeat of the early "nationalist" movement of the early 19th century but is more accurately the artists' desire to escape the hegemony of the classical tradition manifold at that time. Béla Bartók took this departure into the abstract musical world in his appropriation of traditional Hungarian music as the basis for symphonic creations. Béla Bartók and Zoltán Kodály studied over 300 melodies, and noted that more modern tunes used for dancing featured pentatonic turns with frequent leaps in fourths.

== See also ==
- Culture of Hungary
- Music of Hungary
- Kontra
