= Muzsikás =

Hungarian band

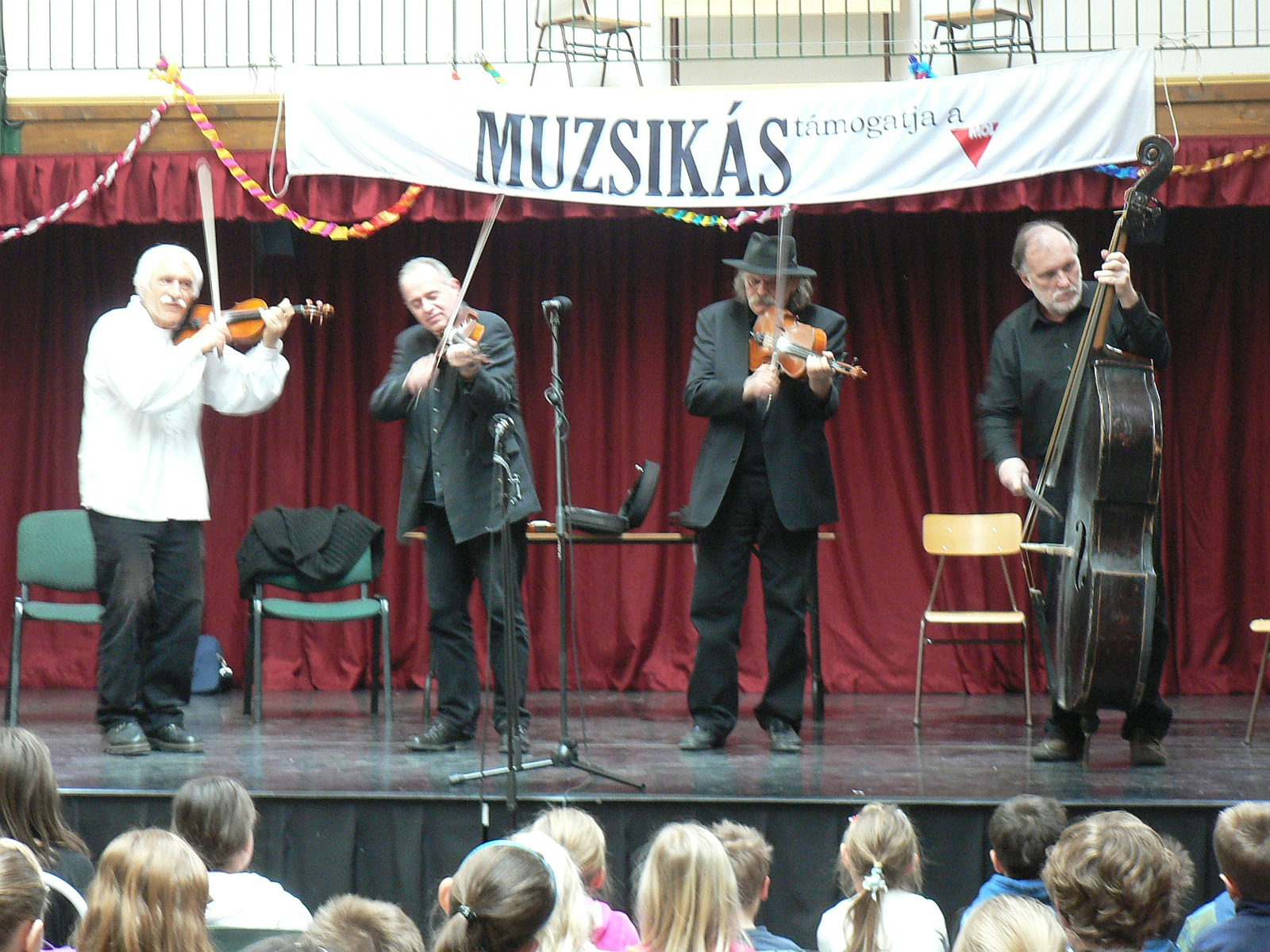
Muzsikás (2012)

Muzsikás is a Hungarian musical group playing mainly folk music of Hungary and other countries and peoples of the region. Established in 1973, it has also played works by classical composers, especially Béla Bartók, who himself collected folk tunes. The group has recorded other albums and, since 1978, has toured regularly around the world.

The group's collaboration with the noted singer Márta Sebestyén has produced a string of highly regarded recordings. The traditional Hungarian folk song "Szerelem, Szerelem", performed by Muzsikas featuring Márta Sebestyén, featured in the movie The English Patient (1996). Three of their songs are used in the anime film Only Yesterday by Studio Ghibli: "Teremtés" ("Creation"), "Hajnali nóta" ("Dawn Song"), and "Fuvom az énekem" ("I Sing My Song"). The group is mentioned by the main protagonists, while the songs play in the background in a prolonged dialogue about the benefits of a natural environment and rural life.

== Members ==
The group's core members are:

- Mihály Sipos – violin, citera
- László Porteleki – violin, koboz, vocal
- Péter Éri – kontra, viola, mandolin, flute, long flute
- Dániel Hamar – contrabass, gardon, drum, cymbal

Since the death of Péter Éri (1953-2023), the band’s kontra and viola player has been László Mester, in the role of a permanent guest musician.

Permanent guests are:

- Márta Sebestyén – vocal, flute, tilinkó
- Zoltán Farkas – choreography, dance, percussion
- Ildikó Tóth – choreography, dance

The group also plays regularly with a range of other musicians and groups.

== Discography ==
Albums

- Living Hungarian Folk Music 1. (Élő Népzene I.) Muzsikás Együttes (Hungaroton Gong), 1978
- The Prisoner's Song (Hannibal/Ryko), 1986
- Márta Sebestyén and Muzsikás (Hannibal/Ryko), 1987
- Blues for Transylvania (Hannibal/Ryko), 1991
- Maramaros, the Lost Jewish Music (Hannibal/Ryko), 1993
- Muzsikás Kettő (Munich Records), 1995
- It is not like it used to be (Hungaroton Gong), 2001
- Morning Star (Hannibal/Ryko), 2003
- The Bartók Album (Hannibal/Ryko), 2004
- Live at the Liszt Academy (Muzsikás), 2007

Compilations

- Fly Bird, Fly - The very best of Muzsikás (Demon Music Group Ltd), 2011

Contributing artist

- The Rough Guide to World Music (World Music Network, 1994)
