= Yebra =

Yebra may refer to:

== People ==
- Igor Yebra (born 1974), Spanish ballet dancer
- Óscar Yebra (born 1974), Spanish basketball player
- Valentín García Yebra (1917–2010), Spanish philologist

== Places ==
- Yebra, Guadalajara, Spain
- Yebra, Benuza, Spain
- Yebra de Basa, Spain

== Other ==
- Yebra (crater)
