= Bálint Tárkány-Kovács =

Hungarian musician

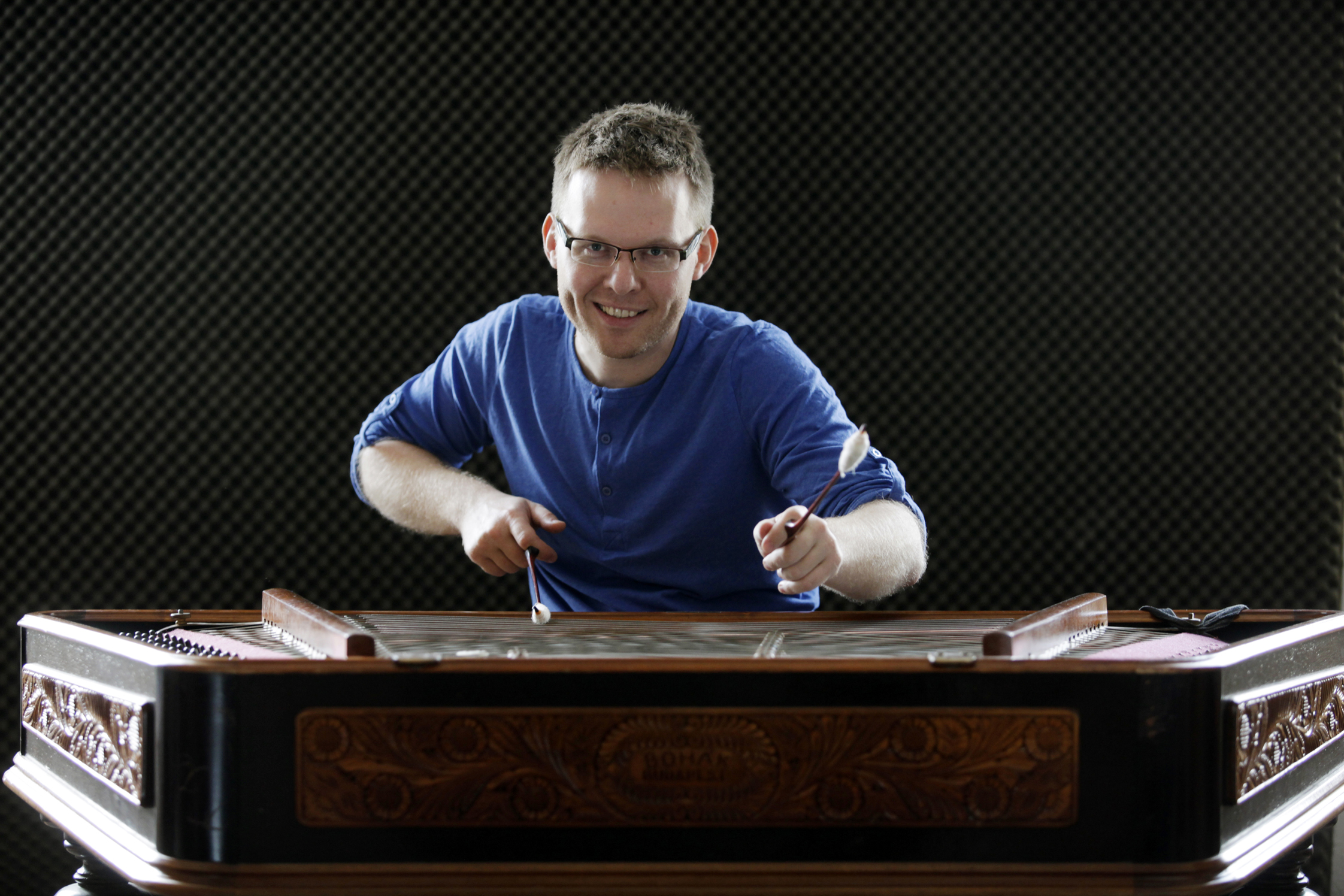
Balint Tarkany-Kovacs

Balint Tarkany-Kovacs (1980 in Budapest) is one of Hungary's foremost cimbalom players, who plays traditional Hungarian music and ethno-jazz as well.

== Biography ==
Balint was born in Budapest in 1980, and had started learning the cimbalom at the age of seven. He graduated in Folk Cimbalom (BA) in the Franz Liszt Academy of Music traditional music faculty in 2011. Now he has been studying at the Cimbalom Teacher Faculty (MA), where his maestro is Kalman Balogh.

=== Tarkany Muvek ===
Since 2008, he has founded and led the band Tarkany Muvek, where he does not only play the cimbalom but composes songs and writes lyrics as well. He also plays in Fonó Folk Band and Tündök band.

The group fuses traditional Hungarian folk with classical music and avant garde jazz, more recently with reggae and rock. The band's recordings include the album Introducing Tárkány Müvek. Tárkány Művek released its first album in May, 2010 and quickly became one of the most popular and celebrated young folk bands of Hungary. The songs of the album "You Etched Your Face in Mine" (Arcomba az arcod vésted) created a new musical language which can be easily described as representing a new pathway in Hungarian contemporary folk. Jazz given to Balkan tastes, chansons and folk songs have led to astonishing tunes. The combination of musical themes which are usually taken from traditional folk songs and novel instrumentation makes Tárkány Művek one-of-a-kind. The distinctive sound of the folk dulcimer or cimbalom, saxophone, kontra and bass are enriched with female vocals.

The band included such musicians as Julianna Paár (singer), Gergő Kováts (saxophone, tárogató, flute, wind instruments), Endre Papp (transylvanian and classical viola), András Bognár (double bass), Petra Kész (singer), Pázmándi Gergely (saxophone), Ádám Móser (accordion, bagpipe), Dániel Arday (contrabass), and David Szegő (drums).

== Studies ==
- 2011- Studying at The Franz Liszt Academy of Music Folk Cimbalom Teacher (MA)learning from Kalman Balogh
- 2011 Graduated at The Franz Liszt Academy of Music Diploma of Folk Cimbalom (BA) learning from Kalman Balogh
- 1996 - 1998 Bela Bartok Music Conservatory (high school) learning from Beatrix Beresne Szollos
- 1987 - 1995 Lovey - Klara Music Specialised Elementary School learning classical and folk from Beatrix Beresne Szollos

== Discography ==
=== Solo ===
- Korcsos és cigánycsárdás (Tündök zenekar, Táncház-Népzene 2008)
- Marossárpataki sebesforduló (Tündök zenekar, Új Élő Népzene 2008)
- You Etched Your Face in Mine (Tárkány Művek, 2010)
- Mit egyen a baba? (Alma együttes, 2010)
- Itt a nyár MAXI (Tárkány Művek, 2012)

=== With Tárkány Művek ===
- Arcomba az arcod vésted/You Etched Your Face in Mine (2010)
- Címesincs (2013)
- Őszi vázlatok (Autumn sketch) feat. Mihály Dresch - Live concert (2014)
- Magyar konyha támad (Hungarian kitchen bites) (2017)

== Selected performances ==
- 1997 Turkey, Izmir, folk festival with Csombor band
- 1998 Sweden, Storjö Yran Festival Csombor band and Bartok Dance Group
- 2001 France, Csombor band and Bihari Dance Group
- 2002 Esztergom (HU) play on the welcoming ceremony of Emperor Akihito
- 2003 Australia, Hungarian Week in Melbourne
- 2004 Greece, Pentaton
- 2006, 2007 Sziget Festival (HU), Rekontra
- 2008 Welcoming ceremony of Ilham Aliyevv president of Azerbaijan
- 2008 Hungarion State Opera, Tundok band
- 2009 Belgium, Csombor band and Bihari Dance Group
- 2009 SZIN Festival (HU), Tarkany Muvek
- 2010 - 2012 New Theatre (HU) solo in the drama Bethlen
- 2010 Budapest, Sandor Palace, the initiation ceremony of the Hungarian President Pal Schmitt
- 2011 Fulek (SK), Tarkany Muvek
- 2011 Gyilkostoi Sokadalom (RO), Tarkany Muvek
- 2011 Diploma Concert in the Liszt Academy
- 2012 Bratislava (SK) - Warszava (PL) tour, Tarkany Muvek
- 2012 MUPA Palace of Arts (HU), Tarkany Muvek
- 2012 Folk Hollydays Namest nad Oslavou (CZ), Fono ensemble
