= Hungarian Slovak Gypsies in America =

Romani subgroup in the United States

The Bashalde (also known as Bashaldé) are a Romani subgroup in the United States of America. The subgroup is linked to a migration of Romani people to the United States in the late 19th century from Slovakia, then within the borders of the historical Kingdom of Hungary. Many migrated from what is now Košice (previously part of the Sáros and Zemplín counties in the Kingdom of Hungary). They settled in the cities of Braddock, Homestead, Johnstown, and Uniontown, Pennsylvania; Cleveland and Youngstown, Ohio; Detroit and Delray, Michigan; Gary, Indiana; Chicago, and New York City and Las Vegas. The Balshade were a community of settled Romani, and in the United States were well known for playing music for the Central European immigrant communities in which they settled. These Romani were known for playing in cafes and restaurants, the name Bashalde emerged in the late 20th century; portions of them were also known as Romungre. In the early 1900s the Romani in Braddock, Pennsylvania, purchased an entire block of homes, making them the largest population of settled Romani in the United States.

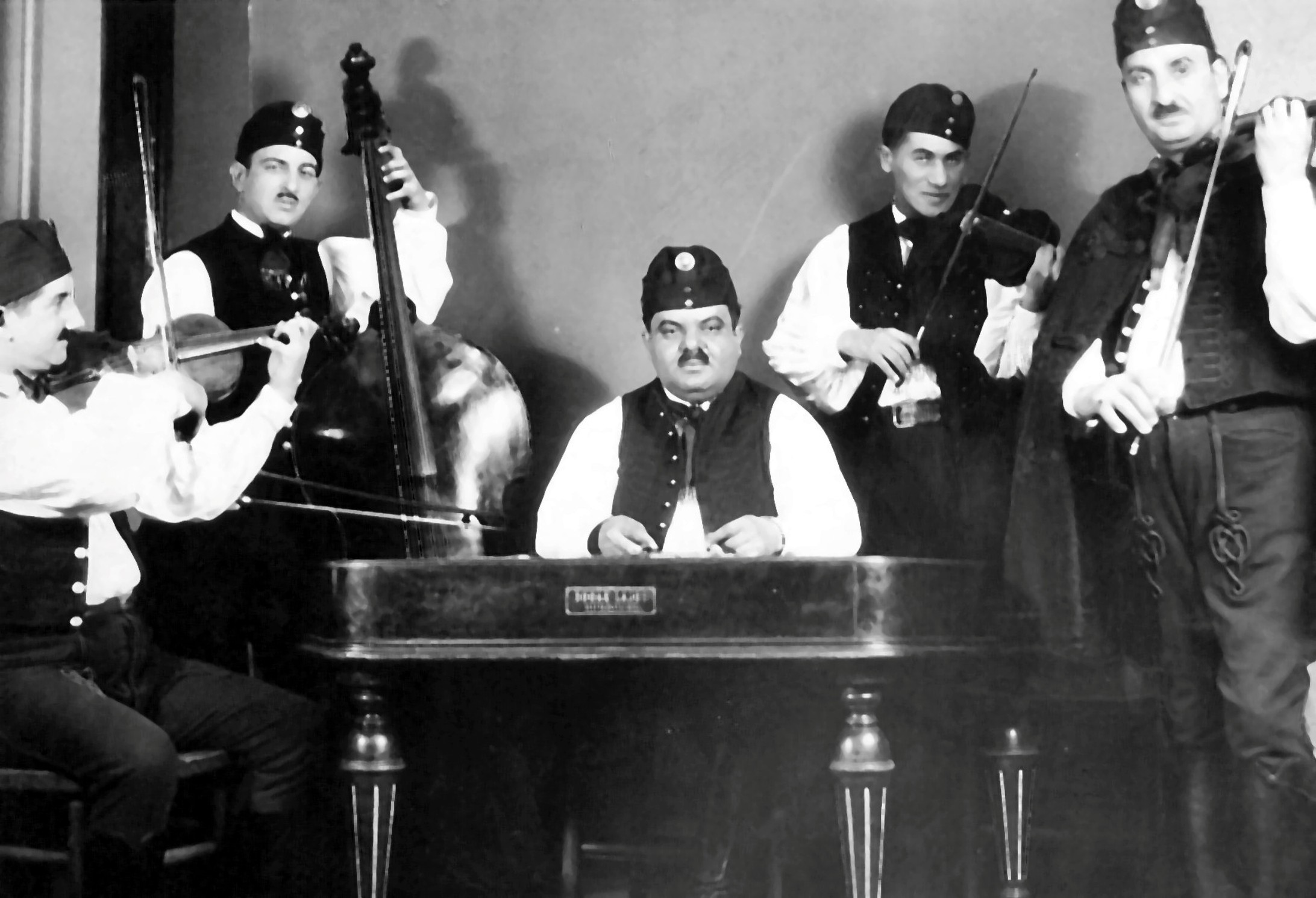
John Brenkacs Gypsy Orchestra c. 1925, Bashalda orchestra consisting of John Breckacs (Primas), Albert Balog (viola), Geza Duna (bass), Louis Balog (cimbalom), Rudy Rigo (violin)

A Bashalde orchestra consists of a lead violin referred to as a Primas, a second violin or viola, tenor violin, bass fiddle and a cimbalom. Their music was an important part of world roots music, and they performed throughout America in a variety of music genres. They brought to America the traditional Gypsy music from Hungary, which had developed in Europe for centuries. These Rom musicians were descendants of famous Romani orchestras such as János Bihari, whose descendants today are the Lakatos family; female Romani violinist Czinka Panna; Pista Dankó; Rigó Jancsi; Imre Magyari; and Racz Laci. They created the Csárdás, which influenced such composers as Joseph Haydn; Franz Liszt, who wrote fifteen Hungarian rhapsodies; Johannes Brahms, who wrote twenty-one Hungarian dances; Antonín Dvořák; Pablo de Sarasate, who wrote Zigeunerweisen; Georges Bizet, who wrote Carmen; and Maurice Ravel, who wrote Tzigane.

By 1920, Cleveland had the largest population of Hungarians in America, second to Budapest. Cleveland Hungarians held hundreds of events every year and the Roma were the entertainment for all of these events. Detroit's Delray district had many Hungarian restaurants such as the Hungarian Village, where as many as four cimbaloms would be set up to play, and in Braddock, Pennsylvania, journalists from all over the world were writing about them. These Hungarian Romani musicians played all the major Hungarian events, and many American events for over 100 years, and in the finest restaurants in the country. They also played many weddings and special occasions, including movies. For over 100 years, newspaper articles, books, and journals documented them and their traditions. One tradition is the Hungarian Gypsy funeral were as many as fifty to seventy-five musicians would play for the deceased in a funeral procession. Many of the funerals news reporters covered went through the Associated Press in newspapers all over the world. The best known Primas' (lead violin) came from this group such as Joska Rabb, Ernie Kiraly, Max Bandy, Kal Bandy, Maxie Rigo, Martze Ballog, William Garber, John Brenkacs, Louis Ballog, Albert Balog, Geza Duna, Rudy Rigo, Emery Deutsch, Frank Richko, Maxie Fransko, Rudy Balog, Rudy Ziga, Arthur Rakoczi, Gusty Horvath, Alex Udvary, George Batyi, Tony Ballog, Billy Rose, Martze Ballog, Willie Horvath, Bill Yedla, Albert Duna, Albert Horvath, and Bella (Bendy) Ballog.

The Gypsy Countess Verona, was one of the most famous of these Hungarian-Slovak Roma. She married the Count Dean Szechy de Szechy Favla, of Budapest. She was one of the greatest cimbalom players in the world; she toured the world, made records and wrote music.

In 1924, Henry Ford, in an effort to get the young people away from jazz and back into the old music, started his Old Fashion Dance Band. Musicians from all over the world auditioned for a spot in the band. The cimbalom player was a Hungarian Gypsy from Braddock, William Hallup. They made records, traveled the world and played at all Ford's events. His cimbalom is in the Henry Ford Museum.

== Notable people ==
- Elek Bacsik (1926–1993), jazz guitarist and violinist
- Ian Hancock (b. 1942), linguist

== Bibliography ==
- Harvard University Study on Roma with all Roma experts including Steve Piskor. Tells you about the world "Gypsy" and Hungarian Slovak Gypsies. An 80 page published study.
- Romani Realities in the United States - Harvard University
- Gypsy Violins Hungarian Slovak Gypsies in America, 2012 by Steve Piskor ISBN 978-0-578-09989-7
- Gypsy Fires in America p. 214 by Irving Brown, 1924 - Irving Brown writes about Braddock, Pa Gypsies
- Raggle-Taggle: Adventures with a Fiddle in Hungary and Romania by Walter Starkie, 1933 - Starkie writes about him, John Brencas and Imre Magyari in Budapest. ISBN 9780719513381
- The Gypsy in a Non-Gypsy Economy Erdmann Doane Beynon American Journal of Sociology, Vol. 42, No. 3 (Nov., 1936), pp. 358–370, Gypsies of Delray, MI
- The Journal of American Folklore, Endre De Spur, 1958, Gypsies of Braddock, PA.
- The Survey by the Charity Organization Society of the city of New York reference to Gypsies of Braddock, Pa
- The Canadian Journal of Economics and Political Science reference to Gypsies of Braddock, Pa ISSN 0315-4890 OCLC 47075794
- The Encyclopædia Britannica, 1956 - Braddock, Pa
- The Hammered Dulcimer by Paul Gifford ISBN 978-0-8108-3943-4
- Gypsies in the United States. Smithsonian Education
- Arrival of Gypsies in America. Gypsyjib.wetpaint.com
- Gypsy Immigration Encyclopedia of North American Immigration. Facts on File. 2005.
- Emery Deutsch - Violinist and Songwriter. New York Times, 20 April 1997
- Gypsy and Traveler Culture in America. Gypsy Lore Society
- What US musical tradition can teach us about roma culture. George Soros Foundation
- Author-records romany music culture. Pittsburgh Post-Gazette September 8, 2012
- Encyclopida of Cleveland History: Gypsies
- Professor Steve Balkin, University of Illinois, Roma Page, links to many Roma sites, videos, and music.
