= String drum =

String drum can refer to:

- Tambourine de Bearn, a string drum that looks like a zither
- Lion's roar (instrument), a type of friction drum
