= Tambourine de Bearn =

Rectangular box zither beaten with a mallet

Tambourine de Béarn
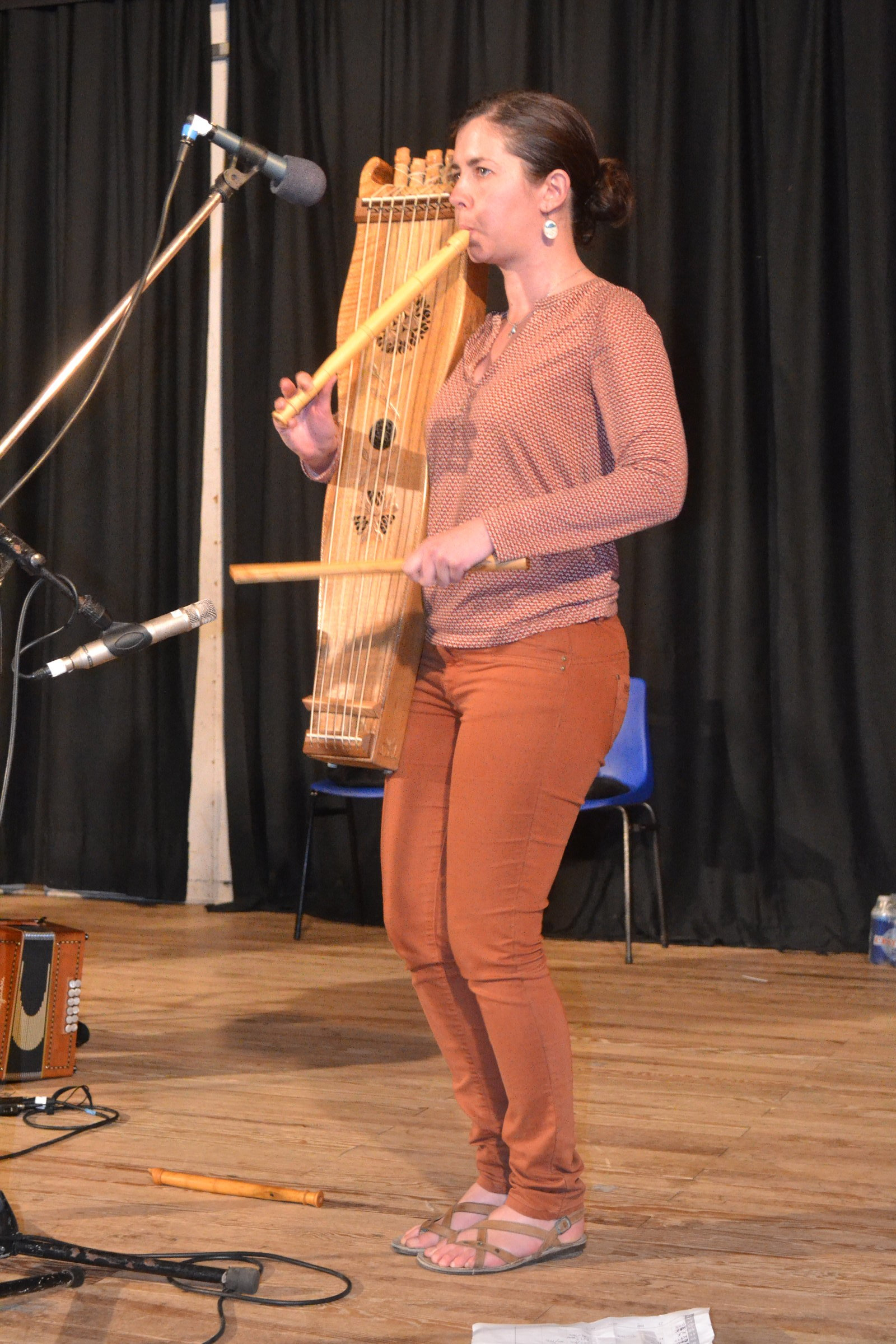
- Cécile Nuñez plays Tambourin de Béarn and one-handed flute (flabuta) in Le Passage, Gascony, 2016.
- Other names: string drum, tambourin de Gascogne, tambourin à cordes, Pyrenean string drum, ttun-ttun, toun-toun, psalterio salmo, chicotén
- Classification: String instrument

Playing range
- Drone (sound)

Related instruments
- Hammered dulcimer, Tabor, Psaltery, Zither, Aeolian harp

Sound sample

The string drum or Tambourin de Béarn (in French) is a long rectangular box zither beaten with a mallet. It is paired with a one-handed flute (French: galoubet) with three finger holes, similar to a pipe and tabor. It has also been called tambourin de Gascogne, tambourin à cordes in Catalan, Pyrenean string drum, ttun-ttun in Basque (pronounced [cunˈcun]), salmo in Spanish, and chicotén in Aragonese. It was known in the middle ages as the choron or chorus.

In specific usage, this name denotes a form of long psaltery-styled instrument that is tuned to provide drone chords when drummed. It can be found in a similar body shape with three to eight strings. The tuning is often held in root, tonic and dominant, or root and fifth. That with one psaltery-related instrument is easy to play because the strings are struck with a mallet as a whole.

The name salterio or psalterium for the instrument comes from Yebra, Spain. Researcher Violet Alford said that it was a mistake to include the stringed drum under the name of psalterium, the Latin name of a strummed or plucked instrument.

Curt Sachs described the Tambourine de Béarn as being from South France, a "longitudinal zither with thick gut strings tune to tonic and dominant." The effect was two tones at the same time perceived together as a chorus.

It has five or six strings tuned in 5ths.

== Method ==
It is slung on the arm or over the shoulder of a player who uses the same hand to play the pipe, while striking the strings with a linen covered stick held in the other hand. The 6 strings (3 sets) are most often tuned in octaves that match the keynote of the tabor pipe, and can be played pianissimo as well as forte.

== Extent and uses ==
According to Jeremy Montagu, the string drums were in continuous use through the middle ages, seen in iconography.

The instrument is currently widespread in the western Pyrenees, and it bears the hallmark of the territory. Apparently invented in the 15th century, it came into use in the Pyrenees, where it took hold. It is popular in the easternmost Basque province of Soule (Zuberoa), where it provides along with the three hole flute (xirula) the necessary musical background for traditional dance performances and the carnival set of performances called maskarada, which takes place on a yearly basis in different villages of the former viscounty.

After losing ground during the 20th century in western and central Pyrenees, namely Bigorre, Béarn and Soule, the practice of the three hole flute and tambourin came almost to a halt after World War II, except for the Ossau Valley in Béarn. Evidence has been gathered also that with different names (such as salterio) it was played along with the flute early in the 20th century in small areas of High Aragon. From the 1970s on, the instrument has shown renewed vitality.

== Construction ==
It is a very simple form of psaltery or box zither, made of a wooden sounding box, with strings stretched from end to end, lengthwise. Its construction is similar to that of the Aeolian harp or Appalachian dulcimer. The Pyrenean version of the instrument numbers 4 to 10 strings but 3 sets of 2 (6 total) is the common arrangement.

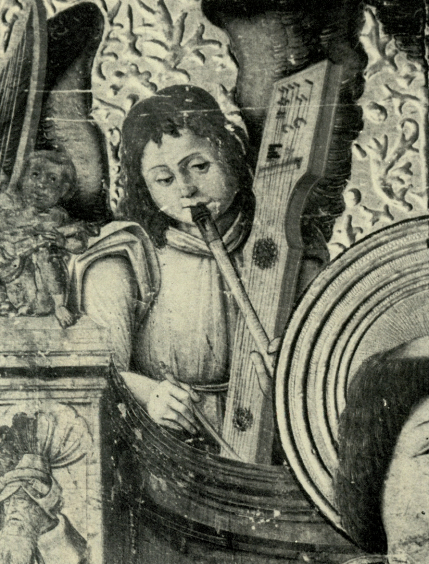
Altarpiece of Saint Vincent, detail of boy playing a Tambourine de Béarn, by Master of Javierre

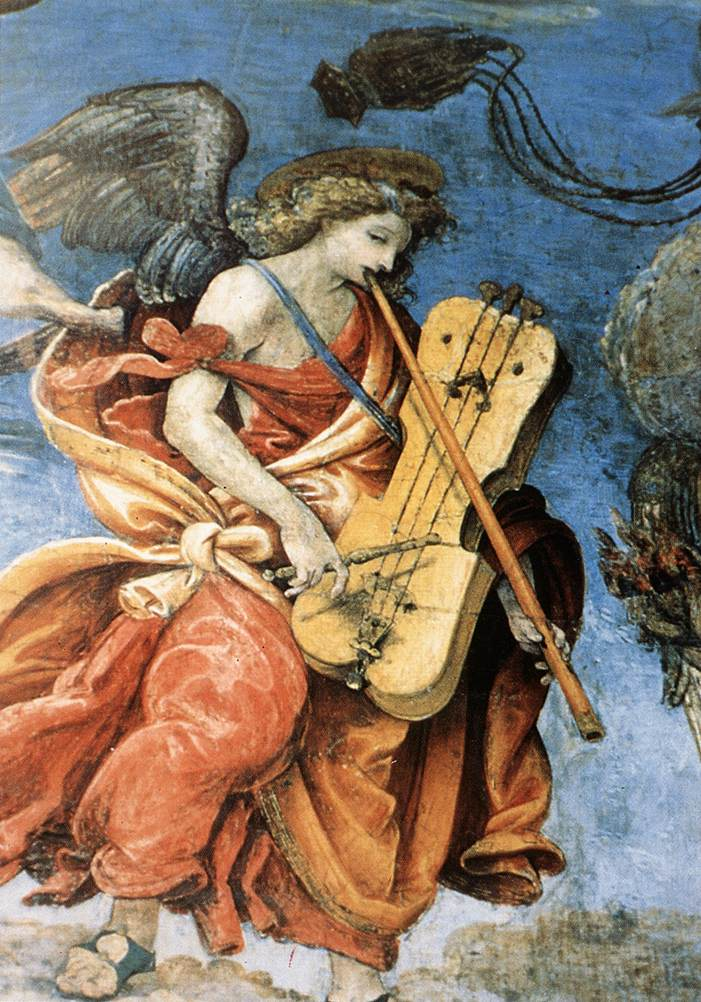
String drum or psalterium in a fresco at Santa Maria sopra Minerva. Also called dulcimer and pipe.

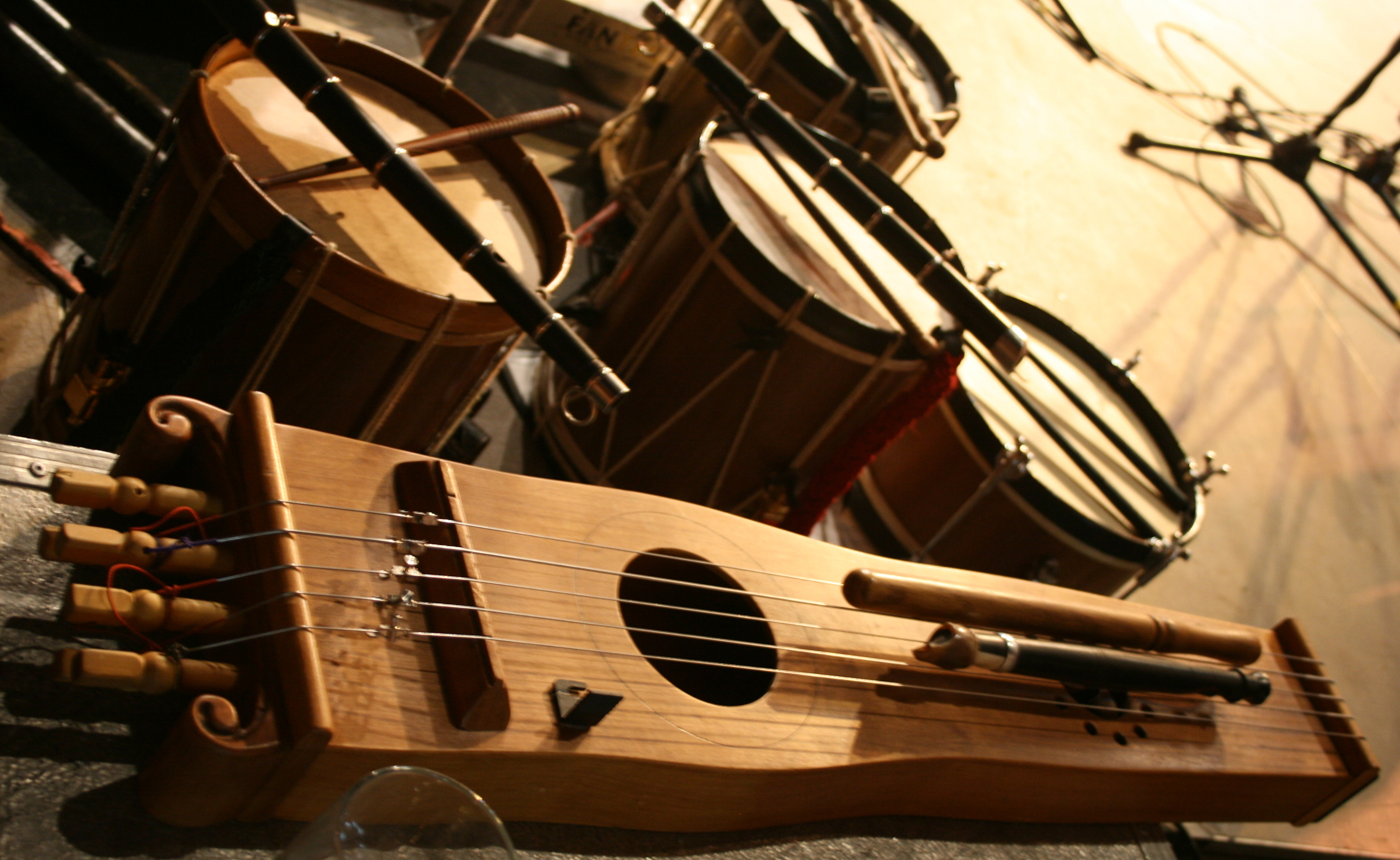
Basque ttun-ttun.

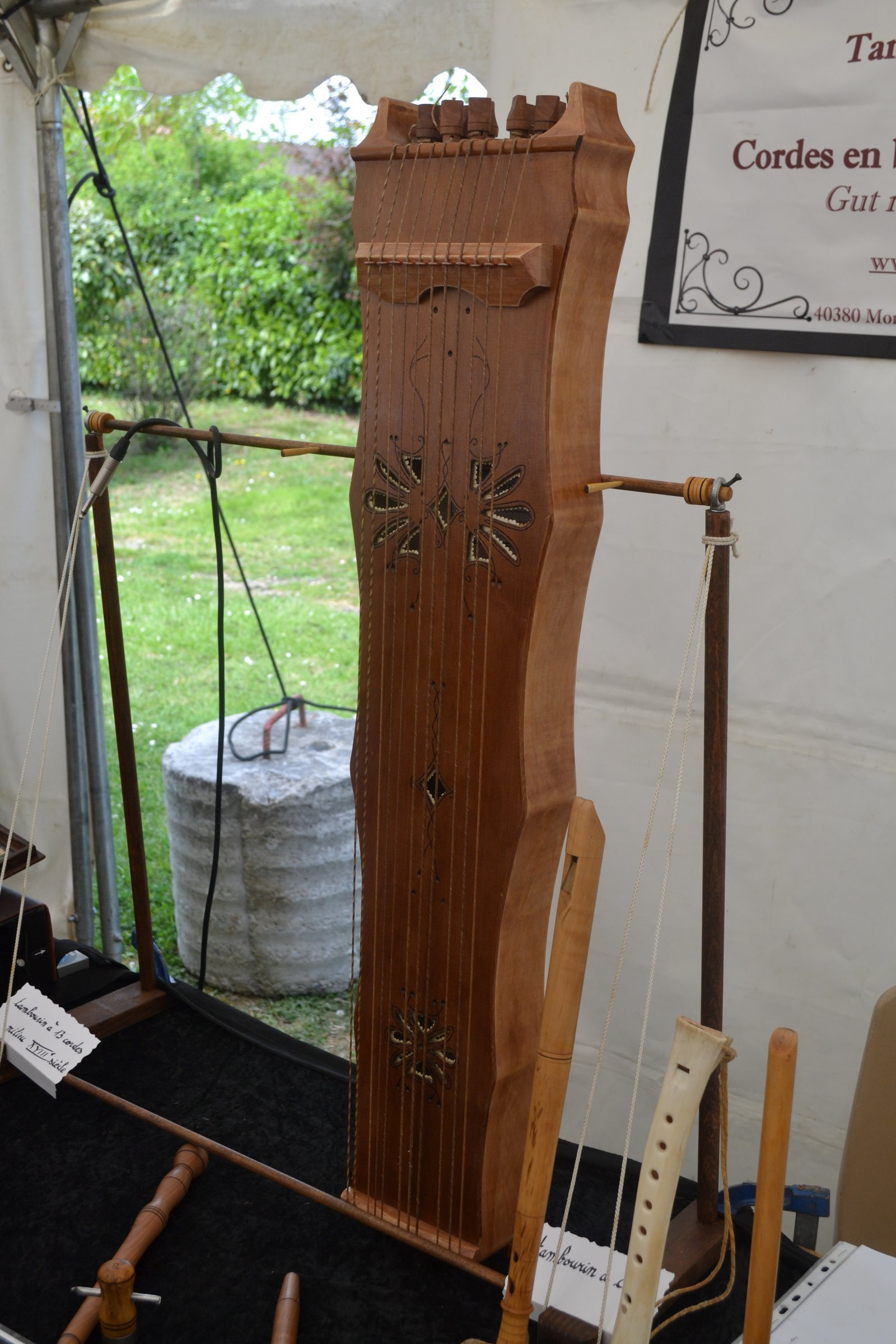

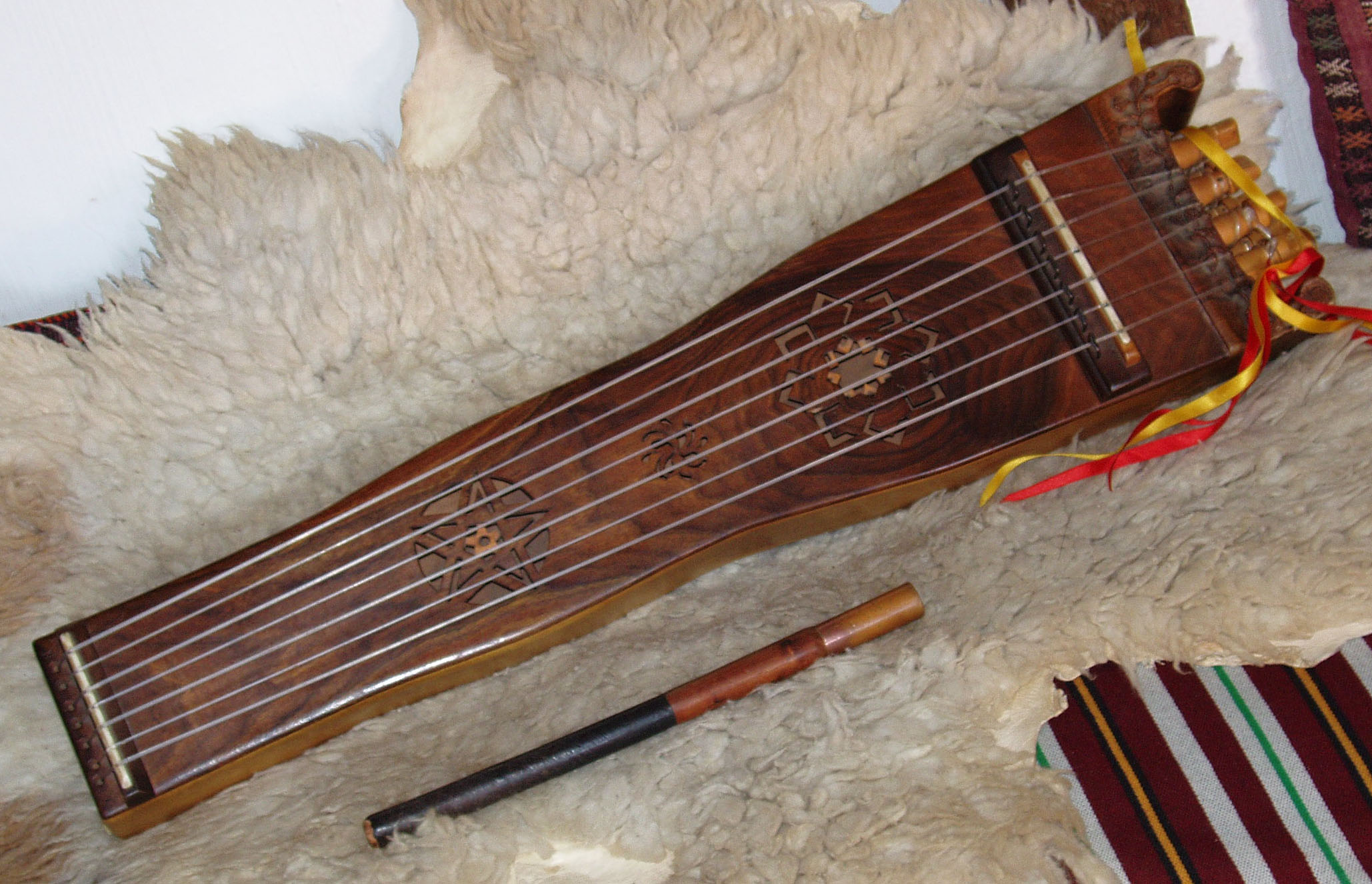
Toum-toum or Tambourin à cordes, currently used in traditional dances

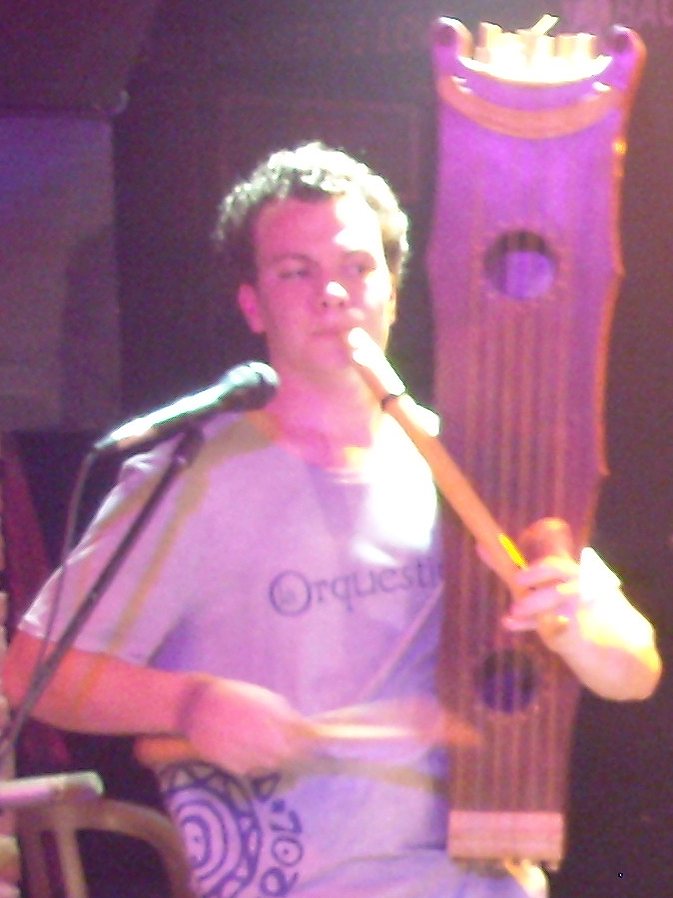
Intèrpret de chiflo (flauta tradicional de tres forats) i chicotén

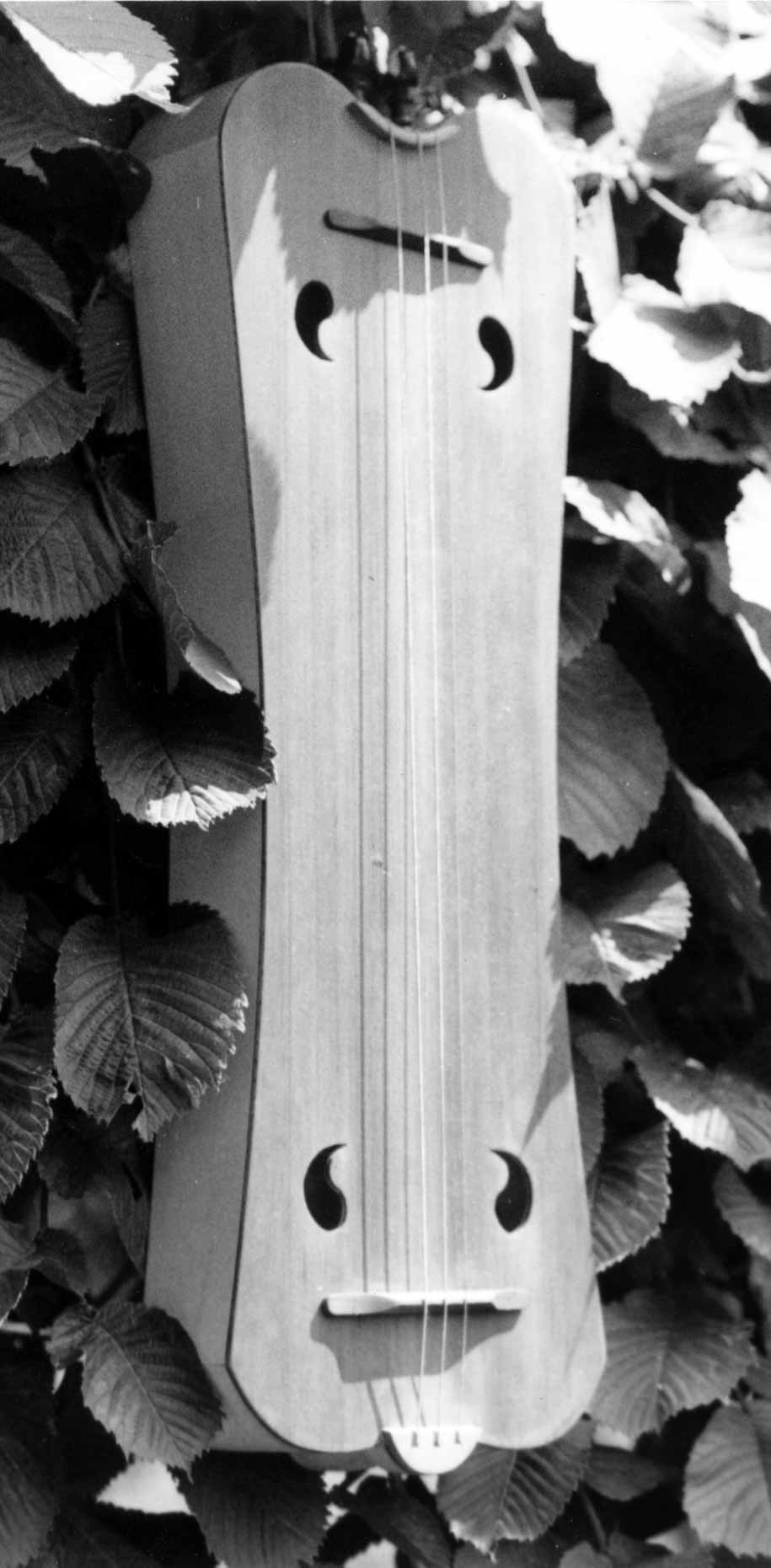
Tambor de Béarn

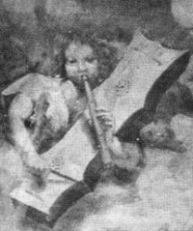
Tambor de cordes in a painting by Juan Galbán Jiménez (17th century) in the Convento de la Concepción, Épila, Zaragoza, Aragon

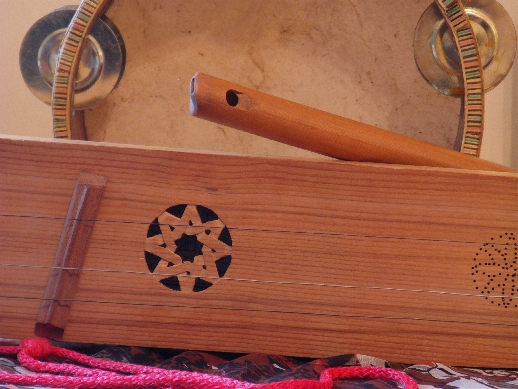
Roseta de tambor de Béarn built by José Verdi

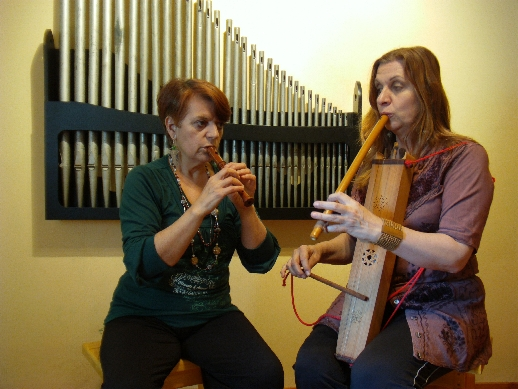
Tambor de Béarn built by José Verdi, three hole flute and sopranino flute

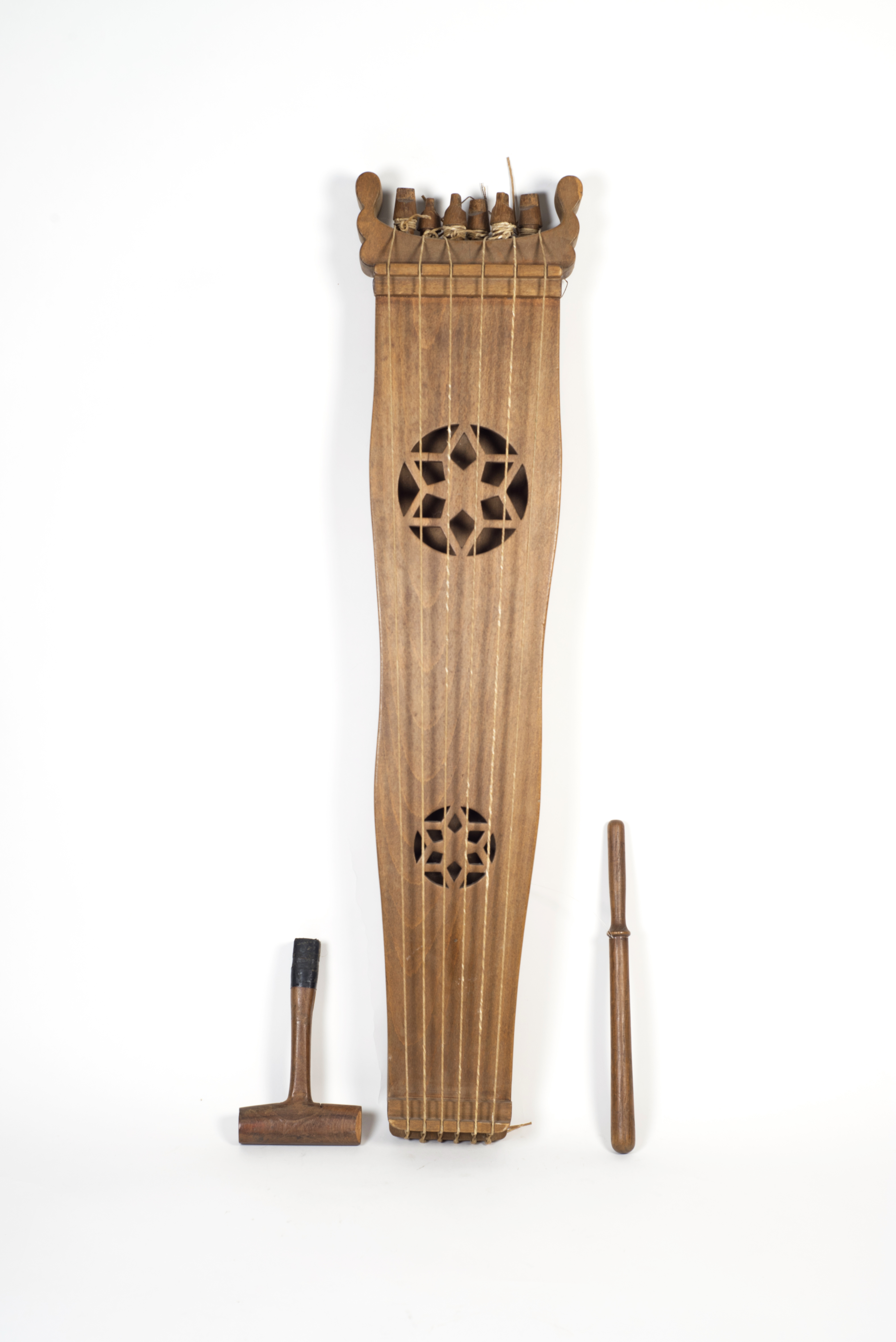
Basque string drum called a ttun-ttun or danburia

== See also ==
- Guitar zither
- Hammered dulcimer
- Pipe and tabor
- Psaltery
- Ütőgardon, a Hungarian string drum shaped like a cello
