= Fonó Folk Band =

Fonó Zenekar, the Fonó Folk Band is a Hungarian folk band, playing traditional Hungarian music.

== History ==
Fonó Folk Band was founded in 1997 in Budapest. Its members are musicians from around Hungary and its various historical regions such as the Hungarian-minority areas of Slovakia and Ukraine, who have devoted their careers to performing, teaching and researching traditional folk music. Their repertoire consists of Magyar and other Carpathian-Basin peoples' instrumental and vocal music, and authentic arrangements in these traditions. The members of the band themselves collect folk music - an experience they use to boost the band's repertoire.

== Members ==
- Andrea Navratil - vocals
- Gergely Agócs - vocals, tárogató, bagpipe, fujara, flutes
- Tamás Gombai - violin, second violin
- István Pál “Szalonna” - violin, second violin
- Sándor D. Tóth - viola, hurdy-gurdy, gardon, drum, cobsa, zither
- Zsolt Kürtösi – doublebass, cello, accordion
- Balint Tarkany-Kovacs - cimbalom

== Discography ==
- Sok szép napot éjszakával [A Lot of Beautiful Days and Nights] - Honvéd edition, Budapest 1998
- Árgyélus kismadár [The Little Bird] - Hungarian folk music from Southern Slovakia (with singer Gyöngyi Écsi) - Fonó Records, Budapest, 2000
- Musique de danse Hongroise - Anthology of Hungarian folk music, Buda Musique, Paris, 2001
- Mixtura Cultivalis – Folk music from the Carpathian Basin, Fonó Records, Budapest, 2002
- Túlparton / Other side – Art Music of Béla Bartók and its Folk Roots, Hungaroton, Budapest, 2004
- Hateha! – Evergreens of the Dance House - Hungarian folk music, Fonó edition, Budapest, 2009

== Awards ==
- 2003 – Choc de l’Année (Le Monde de la musique, Paris)
- 2005 – eMeRTon (Magyar Rádió - Hungarian State Broadcasting Company, Budapest)
- 2006 – Kodály Price (Magyar Művészeti Akadémia - Hungarian Academy of Arts, Budapest)
