= Pista Dankó =

Hungarian Romani bandleader and composer

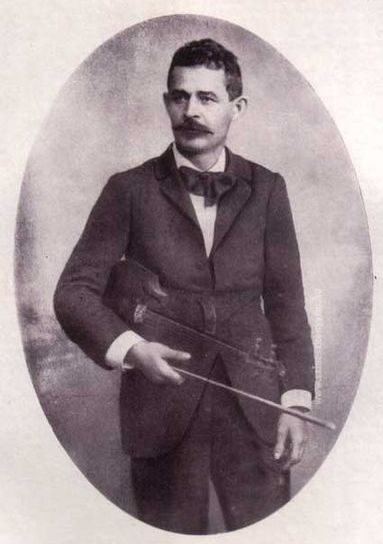
Pista Dankó

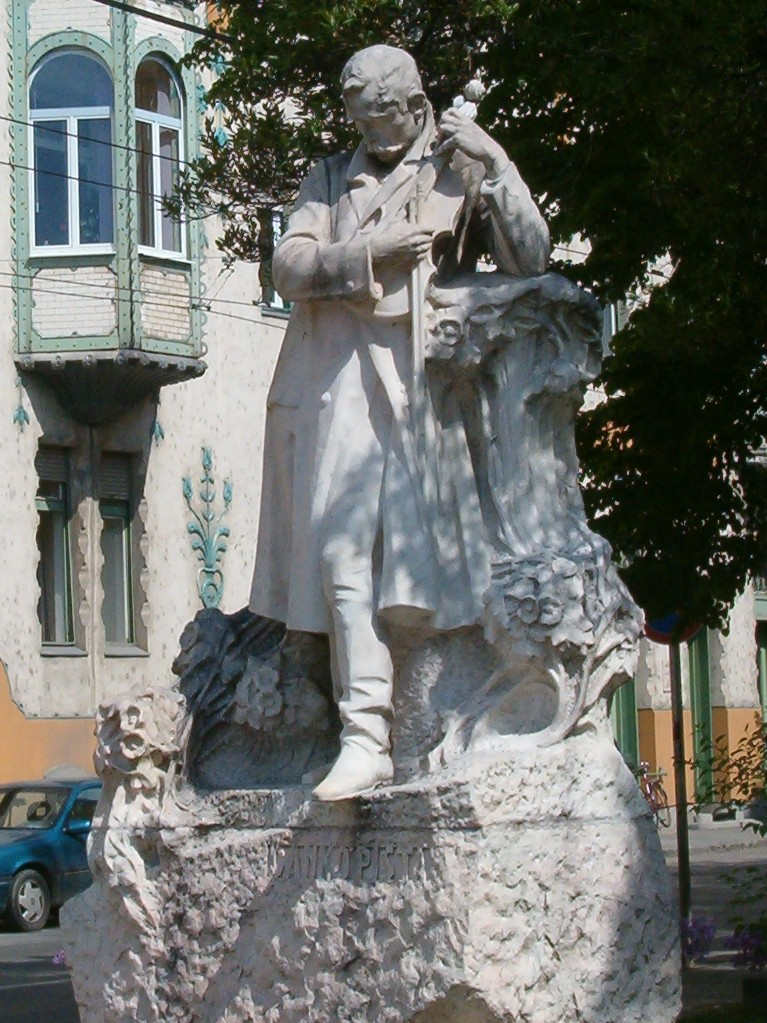
Statue of Pista Dankó in Szeged

Pista Dankó was a Hungarian-born bandleader and composer belonging to the Romani people. He primarily worked in the folk music styles popular in Hungary in the 19th century. He was frequently known by the nickname "Nótafa", a Hungarian word meaning "ballad-singer of folk music".

== Biography ==
Born on 14 June 1858. Dankó was born in the Hungarian city of Szeged, where he began composing music at the age of 28. He belonged to a musical ensemble called "Hangászsor", or "row of musicians". He then moved to the city of Szatmar, where he would meet and begin courting Ilonka Joó, the daughter of Szatmar's mayor. Since Dankó was a gypsy, the mayor disapproved of the relationship, prompting Dankó and Joó to elope. The two were together until Pista's death from lung disease on 29 March 1903.

== Musical style ==
Due to Dankó's heritage, he was steeped in Hungarian folk music, and most of his works were written in the popular verbunkos and nóta folk dance music styles. He also composed works in other styles such as marches.

== Musical works ==
While living in Szeged, Dankó composed music for over 400 poems, including the work of Lajos Pósa. One of his most popular songs of the time was Az a szép, az a szép (Handsome is, handsome is), which is still among popular folk dance songs in Hungary. At the request of his associate Géza Gárdonyi, a prominent Hungarian author, Dankó composed a march named A magyarok bejövetele (March of the Hungarians) for the thousandth anniversary of the Hungarian state in 1885. This work represented the pinnacle of Dankó's popularity in life, earning him a status rarely achieved by a Rom among the elite in Hungary.

== Legacy ==
Dankó is a rare example of a Rom who was born into poverty and then rose to relative fame and fortune. He primarily did this by working to satisfy the musical taste of the public, and thus achieving popularity. As is often the case, Dankó received a considerable amount of recognition after his death, when following generations of Hungarians were even more enthusiastic about and accepting of his music.

A public statue of Dankó was erected in Szeged, on the bank of the Tisza river. A Hungarian-language film named Dankó Pista was also made based on his life, released in January 1941. The folk music programme of Hungarian Radio is named Dankó Radio.
