= Irén Lovász =

Hungarian folk singer and ethnographer (born 1961)

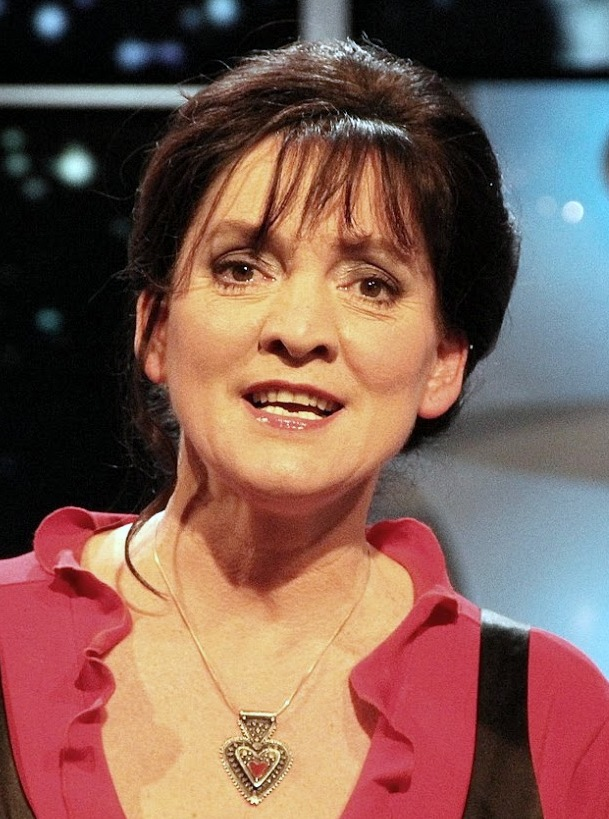

Background information
- Born: 11 April 1961 (age 65); Karcag, Hungary
- Genre: Folk song
- Years active: 1995–present
- Label: SIRENVOICES

Irén Lovász is a Hungarian folk singer and ethnographer. She has a total of 12 albums to her credit, including on the Erdenklang Music, CC'nC Records, Fono, and Hungaroton Classics labels as well as recent CDs on her own SIRENVOICES label. She is featured on several compilations, including on the HEARTS OF SPACE label, WARNER MUSIC France, Minos-EMI, and other world music compilations.

== Music career ==
Her first solo CD, Világfa (1995, and 1999. Fonó Records), appeared at the request of the Hungarian National Museum to be used as background music for the exclusive archaeological exhibition of the Millennium of the Hungarian conquest. The music was created by László Hortobágyi.

Her first solo CD in Germany, Rosebuds in a Stoneyard (Erdenklang 1996), received the German Critics' Award in the genre folk/world music.

She was also the soloist in Early Music groups and also sang contemporary music and worked with jazz musicians. She toured in Europe with the Berlin-based jazz guitarist, Ferenc Snétberger. (see. Obsession, Enja Records 1998). She was also a member of the Gayan Uttejak Orchestra directed by László Hortobágyi.

An Estonian contemporary composer, Peeter Vähi wrote new music for her voice in which she sings early medieval Tibetan and Sanskrit language texts: Supreme Silence (CC'nC Records 2000).

From 1998 until 2003, she worked with the Makám group. Their project is based on ancient Hungarian folk songs, and the authentic performance of these with Irén's voice. However, it also conceives a new musical world by the composer, Zoltán Krulik, using the language of contemporary music, employing the style of ethno-jazz, and adopting different ethnic sounds and instruments of traditional cultures. Their collaborative CDs are: Skanzen 1999, 9 Colinda 2001, and Sindbad 2002. (Fonó Records)

In 2000, she was invited as a vocal soloist by the Hungarian World Music orchestra.

In 1999, she worked for some years with the Czech-Moravian-Slovak eclectic folk music group TEAGRASS. Their CD is titled: Wide is the Danube ( CC'nC Records 2000).

Since 2001, she has been a member of the 'e-jam' project, which is a mobile formation consisting of varying European musicians and performing mainly in Austria.

In 2001, she performed repeated sold-out concerts with a repertoire of Hungarian Renaissance music, songs and poems, with the classical lute player, István Kónya.

In 2001, she began her next project, an acoustic duo with a contrabass player, Attila Lőrinszky.

In 2003, she received The SINGER OF THE YEAR eMeRton AWARD in Hungary.

In 2005, she founded a new band, and with them she made a new cd: Cloud doors (Hungaroton Classic 2005). The new music is based on archaic Hungarian folk songs, sacred songs and medieval Gregorian chants. The style is ethno-jazz, worldmusic, crossover.

In 2006, on her own new label she started to publish a new CD series on Healing Voices, which was also recommended by the Hungarian Association of Music Therapists: Sacred Voice, (SIRENVOICES 2006), Inner Voice, (SIRENVOICES 2007).

In 2008, she accomplished a crossover project with renown musicians of varied musical backgrounds, like Kornél Horváth (jazz), Béla Ágoston (folk, ethno-jazz) and István Győri, Zsolt Szabó (early music). The music is based on Hungarian Renaissance love poetry, folksongs and dance tunes of the 16-18th centuries. The CD is titled: Flower in Love, (SIRENVOICES 2008.)

In 2009 she made a third, revised, remixed edition of her famous Világfa CD with László Hortobágyi : Világfa (SIRENVOICES 2009.)

From 2009 to the present she has been leading a weekly therapeutic singing circle in the center of Budapest aimed at healing, communion and personal expression, all in line with her HEALING VOICES album series concept.

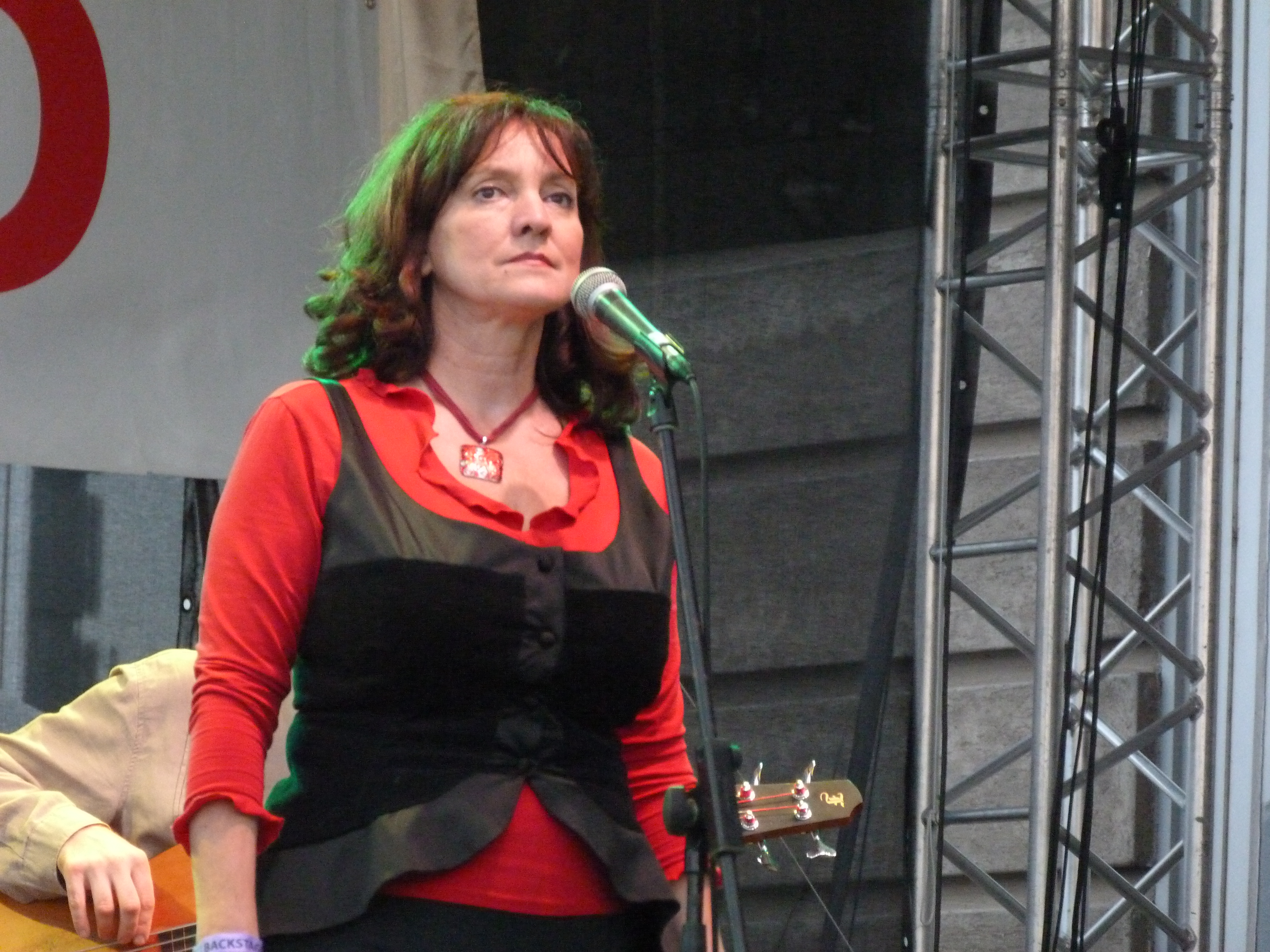
Irén Lovász - 2014

== Discography ==
=== Solo compact discs ===
1. Világfa (Music by László Hortobágyi) Budapest, National Museum 1995., Fonó Records 1999 (Hungary)
2. Rosebuds in a Stoneyard (Music by László Hortobágyi), Erdenklang Music 1996.(Germany) RECEIVED THE GERMAN RECORD CRITIC'S AWARD IN 1996/3 IN THE GENRE FOLK/WORLD MUSIC!
3. Supreme Silence (Music by Peeter Vähi) CCn'C Records 1998.(Germany-USA)
4. Skanzen (Music: Makám, composed by: Zoltán Krulik) Fonó Records 1999. (Hungary)
5. Wide is the Danube (Music: TEAGRASS, comp. by. Jiri Plocek) CC'nC 2000. (Germany, U.S.A.)
6. 9 Colinda (Music: Makám, composed by : Zoltán Krulik) Fonó Records 2001. (Hungary)
7. Sinbad (Music: Makám, composed by: Zoltán Krulik) Fonó Records 2002. (Hungary)
8. Cloud Doors/ FELLEGAJTÓ ( Music: Mizsei, Lukács, Szokolay Dongó, Lovász). Hungaroton classic, 2005 (Hungary)
9. Sacred Voice /ÉGI HANG, Healing voices 1. SIRENVOICES 2006.
10. Inner Voice / BELSŐ HANG, Healing Voices 2. SIENVOICES 2007.
11. Flower in Love/ Szerelmes Virág cd. SIRENVOICES 2008.
12. Világfa Remix cd, SIRENVOICES 2009.
13. Soundscape/Hangtájkép cd, (Irén Lovász-Groove&Voice Trio: Kornél Horváth, Zoltán Mizsei) SIRENVOICES 2015.
14. Three Voices/ Trí hlasy: Jitka Šuranská / Irén Lovász / Michal Elia Kamal: Indies Scope/CZ, 2015.
15. Női Hang / Female Voice, Healing Voices 3. SIRENVOICES 2017.

=== World music albums and compilations ===
World music albums and compilations of several record companies around the world, or guest singer of various musical productions such as:

1. Traditional Music of Amygdala by László Hortobágyi, Erdenklang 1991, Germany
2. The Transglobal and Magical Sound of László Hortobágyi, Network Medien GmbH 1996, Germany
3. Her Song, Shanachie Corp. 1996, USA
4. Tanz and Folkfest, Rudolstadt, Hei Deck 1997, Germany
5. Ferenc Snétberger: Obsession, Enja Records 1998, Germany
6. Origines, Warner Music France, 1998, France
7. Ethnic Voices and Songs, MINOS-EMI 1998, Greece
8. Mother Earth, MINOS-EMI 1998, Greece
9. Origins (De l'origine de l'Homme) Origins-EMI 1998, France
10. World Voices 1, Hearts of Space, 1998, USA
11. Ethnica and World Music, New Sounds 1998, Italy
12. Beautiful Morning..., Koch Records 1999, Germany
13. World Festival of Sacred Music 1-2, CCn'C Records, 1999, Germany-USA
14. Hungarian Rhapsody Music by Kálmán Oláh and Peter Lehel, GOOD International Co., 2002. Korea
15. Contrasts + Parallels by Kálmán Oláh Trio, MA Recordings, 2004., Japan
16. I Sowed Pearls, Hungarian world music, Etnofon Records, 2007.

=== Irén Lovász Bibliography ===
1986 Roland Barthes: Világoskamra. Janus I.4. osz. 1–14.

1991 "Szent Szó, Szent Beszéd..." Az archaikus népi imádságok megértéséhez. Vigila 56.6. 335–336.

1992

- Sacred Language and Secret Speech. in: Hoppál, M.-Pentikäinen, J. (eds): Northern Religions and Shamanism. Budapest-Helsinki.39-45.
- Boundaries Between Language and World in "Archaic World Concept". Paper for the X. Congress of the International Society of Folk Narrative Research. "Folk narrative and world view". Innsbruck. 4–11 July. L.Petzold (ed.): Folk narrative and world view. Innsbruck. 463–369.
- Népi imádságok pragmatikai megközelítése. Eloadás a Magyar Szemiotikai Társaság "Irányzatok és kutatási programok a mai magyar szemiotikában" c. konferenciáján, nov.4. kézirat

1993

- Oral Christianity in Hungary: Interpreting Interpretations. in: Davies, J. & I. Wollaston (eds.) The Sociology of Sacred Texts. Sheffield Academic Press. 72–82.
- Religion and Revolution: A Hungarian Pilgrimage in Rumania, in: Martin, L. (ed.) Religious Transformations and Socio-Political Change. Eastern Europe and Latin America. Mouton de Gruyter, Berlin, New York. 127–142.

1994 "Az elme hallja, nem a fül". Egy asszony látomásainak antropológiai megközelítése. in: Küllos I.-Pócs É. (szerk.): Álom, látomás, extázis. Bp. 156–173. 156–173.

1999 A szakrális kommunikáció elméletéhez. In Benedek K. - Csonka Takásc E. (szerk.): Démonikus és szakrális világok határán. Mentalitástörténeti tanulmányok Pócs Éva 60. Születésnapjára. Budapest, 419–440.

2000 Az imádkozásról. In Barna G. (szerk.) Nyisd meg Uram, szent ajtódat. Köszönto kötet Erdélyi Zsuzsanna 80. Születésnapjára. Budapest 3-37.

2001 Életrajzi beszélgetés Erdélyi Zsuzsannával. In Barna G. (szerk. Nyisd meg Uram)Budapest XI-XLV.

2002 Szakrális kommunikáció. Európai Folklór Intézet, Budapest

2005. Gyógyító hang. Előadás a Gyógyító hagyomány c. konferencián.Bp. Hagyományok Háza

2005. A szakrális kommunikáció kutatásáról. Előadás a Szakrális kommunikáció c. konferencián. Bp. Károly Egyetem

2006. Gyógyító hagyomány. Avagy az írástudatlan alkotók tisztelete. Ludányi András (szerk.) Itt-Ott kalendárium.(53–64), Ohio, USA

2008.a. A szakrális kommunikáció kutatásáról, különös tekintettel az imádságra. In. Studia Caroliensia, 2008/2. 37–46

2008.b. Healing Voice. Sacral Communication and healing .Presented in the Symposium: Sacral Communication and Healing /2., at Károlyi Gáspár University, Budapest, Hungary. 1 September 2008.

2010. The Power of Sustainable Heritage through the Healing Voice of Traditional Singing. Presented at the Symposium on Sustainable Heritage, Budapest, Hungary. MTA, 24 April 2010.

== Reviews and articles ==
- Underground Magazin - zenei és kulturális hírek, leírások, fotók
- Manuálterápia és gyógytorna - Sherlock Rehab
- Hungarian folk and world music singer Iren Lovasz discovers churches as favourite concert venues
- Nyitóoldal - Fonó
