= Yebra, Guadalajara =

Yebra, Spain
- Flag Coat of arms

- Location in Spain Yebra, Spain (Castilla-La Mancha) Yebra, Spain (Spain)
- Coordinates: 40.3567°N 2.9667°W
- Country: Spain
- Autonomous community: Castile-La Mancha
- Province: Guadalajara
- Municipality: Yebra

Area
  - Total: 56 km^{2} (22 sq mi)

Population (2025-01-01)
  - Total: 489
  - Density: 8.7/km^{2} (23/sq mi)
- Time zone: UTC+1 (CET)
  - Summer (DST): UTC+2 (CEST)

Yebra is a municipality located in the province of Guadalajara, Castile-La Mancha, Spain. According to the 2004 census (INE), the municipality has a population of 508 inhabitants.
