= Ütőgardon =

Percussive folk musical instrument of Hungary and Romania

ütőgardon
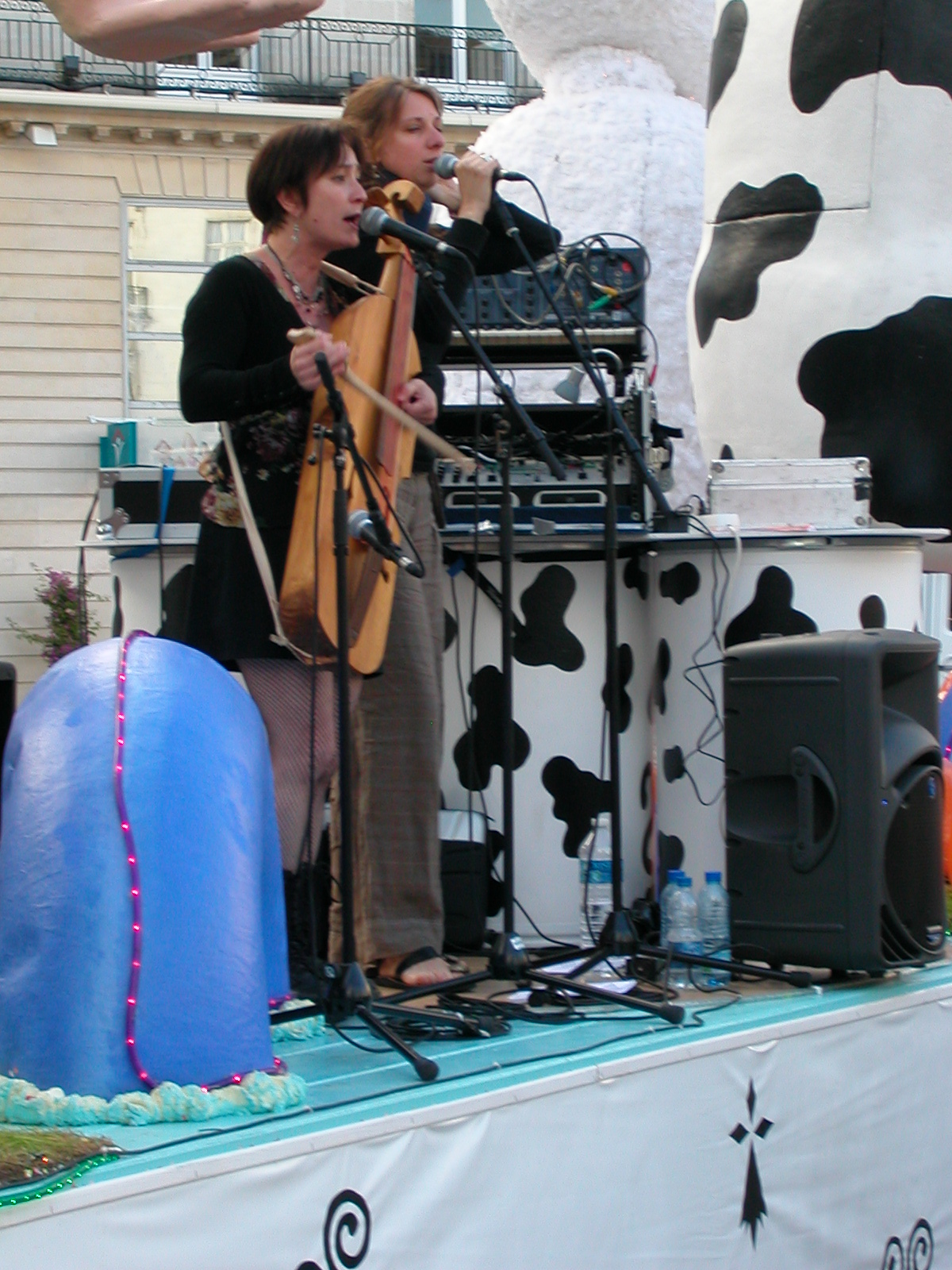
- A person playing the ütőgardon.

String instrument
- Other names: gardon
- Classification: chordophone
- Hornbostel–Sachs classification: 321.322

Related instruments
- cello

The ütőgardon (Hungarian: [ˈytøːɡɒrdon]) also called a gardon, gordună, gardony, ütősgardony, tekenyőgardon, is a folk musical instrument played in Hungary and Romania (the regions of Transylvania and, to a lesser extent, Moldavia). Although it is similar in appearance to a cello, it is played percussively: instead of using a bow, the player plucks and beats the strings with a stick. In the Romanian region of Banat it was an actual cello and the playing was similar—plucking and beating the strings.

== Description ==
The body of this relatively large stringed instrument, usually carved from a single piece of maple, poplar or willow, resembles classical stringed instruments, with a flat or slightly convex back and top, but with much thicker wood. There are four, or sometimes three, strings which are beaten with the bow which resembles a stick approximately 40 cm long and 2 cm in diameter. On the four-string version, three thicker strings correspond to the G-string of the double bass, and the thinner string, used as the plucking string, corresponds to the D or G string of the cello. Currently the most common tuning of the strings is D – D – D – d; previously on three-stringed instruments the tunings were often D – d – g; D – d – a; A – d – d.

== Use ==
Playing with a stick instead of a bow provides a droning accompaniment. The gardon is regularly though not exclusively played by a woman, often the wife of the soloist (violinist) who would teach her or one of his close relatives to play it, or hire someone for that purpose on occasion.

== Cultural origins ==
Musically there are similarities between the violin-gardon ensembles of Hungarians and some Roma in Transylvania and the zurna-davul widespread throughout the Balkans, Anatolia, and the Near East. The gardon was primarily played by the Székelys, a Hungarian ethnic group in Transylvania, and the Csángós of the Gyimes region. We can only have guesses about the instrument's past, perhaps taking on the role of 17th or 18th century dance accompaniment drums, which were used to accompany the Turkish whistle and which were struck on two sides with two different—one thick and one thin. The beaten cello has also been used in the Romanian Banat until 1980s. The Romanian name for it was ”bandă” and the playing was similar—it was plucked with one hand and beaten with the other. Under the name of "gordon", it is still used in Bicaz region. A similar stringed instrument struck with a stick is the tambourin de Béarn in the south of France, which the musician plays with one hand while simultaneously playing a one-handed flute called the galoubet.

== See also ==
- Cello
- Cimbalom
- Kontra
- Music of Hungary
- Zither
