= Kontra =

Transylvanian bowed instrument

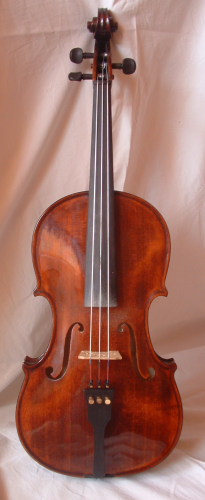
- A kontra shown from the front and the side

String instrument
- Other names: Hungarian: Háromhúros brácsa, Estonian: Kolmekeelne vioola
- Hornbostel–Sachs classification: (Composite chordophone sounded by a bow)

Playing range
- g – d – a

Related instruments
- Violin family (viola, violin, cello); Viol family (includes double bass)

A kontra (Hungarian: háromhúros brácsa, 'three-stringed viola') is a musical instrument found in Hungary, Czechia, Poland, Romania, Slovakia and among the Romani of Transylvania, usually created by modifying a standard viola.

== Construction ==
The kontra can be constructed new, but is most often a classical viola with several modifications. These changes include thinning (or "regraduating") the top, back, and sides to increase the amplitude, and flattening the bridge, which allows the player to sound all three strings at once in order to produce chords. The instrument has three strings rather than the standard four with a viola.

== Tuning ==
The kontra is tuned like a viola, though lacking its low C string: G3-D4-A4. Frequently, the A string is replaced with a second G string tuned to A3, a major second above the G, in a form of re-entrant tuning.

== Technique ==
Due to the flattened bridge, the standard method of play is to play double stops and three-note chords and let the fiddle play melody lines. Rarely, parts of the main melody are also played on the top or the bottom string, but the middle string for a kontra can't be bowed due to the flat bridge.

== Ensemble playing ==
The kontra has a defined role within dance band music. Its range lies between that of the fiddle or Vioara cu goarnă on the high-end and the double bass on the low-end. Many Hungarian and Romanian bands also feature the cimbalom or citera, clarinet, accordion, and Ütőgardon or cello.

== See also ==
- Music of Hungary
- Music of Romania
- Music of Slovakia
- Vioara cu goarnă
